= 2026 CAF Women's Champions League CECAFA Qualifiers =

Tournament details
- Host country: Rwanda
- City: Kigali
- Dates: 21–31 August
- Teams: 10 (from 10 associations)

Final positions
- Champions: (Uganda) Kawempe Muslim Ladies (1st title)
- Runners-up: Kenya Police Bullets
- Third place: (Ethiopia) CBE
- Fourth place: (South Sudan) Yei Joint Stars

Tournament statistics
- Matches played: 16
- Goals scored: 63 (3.94 per match)
- Top scorer(s): (Ethiopia) Emush Daniel (6 goals)
- Best player: (Uganda) Agnes Nabukenya
- Best goalkeeper: (Uganda) Saidah Namwanje
- Fair play award: (South Sudan) Yei Joint Stars
- All statistics correct as of 31 August 2026.

The 2026 CAF Women's Champions League CECAFA Qualifiers is the 6th edition of the CAF Women's Champions League CECAFA Qualifiers, organized by the CECAFA for the women's clubs of association nations. This edition will be held in Rwanda from 21 to 31 August 2026. The winners of the tournament qualify for the 2026 CAF Women's Champions League final tournament.

== Participating clubs ==
The following ten teams contested in the qualifying tournament.

Team	Appearances	Previous best performance
(Burundi) Top Girls Academy	2nd	Group stage (2025)
(Djibouti) FC UJECO	1st	n/a
(Eritrea) Denden FC	2nd	Group stage (2025)
(Ethiopia) CBE	6th	Champions (2024)
Kenya Police Bullets	3rd	Runners-up (2024)
(Rwanda) Rayon Sports	4th	Runners-up (2025)
(South Sudan) Yei Joint Stars	5th	Group stage (2021, 2022, 2023, 2024, 2025)
(Tanzania) Simba Queens	4th	Champions (2022)
(Uganda) Kawempe Muslim	2nd	Third place (2024)
(Zanzibar) Mafunzo FC	1st	n/a

== Venue ==
All matches will be played in Kigali, Rwanda.

Venue	Capacity
Kigali Pelé Stadium	TBD
FERWAFA Technical Centre	TBD

== Match officials ==
On 19 August 2026, CAF announced the selected match officials for the tournament.

Referees

- (Burundi) Joselyne Nsabimana
- (Ethiopia) Yordanos Mulugeta
- (Kenya) Josphine Wanjiru
- (Rwanda) Henriette Byukusenge
- (Rwanda) Aline Umutoni
- (South Sudan) Emmanuela Akoo
- (South Sudan) Stella Sebit
- (Uganda) Diana Murungi

Assistant referees

- (Burundi) Anitha Niyokindi
- (Djibouti) Deka Moussa
- (Eritrea) Arsema Haile
- (Ethiopia) Woinshet Abera
- (Kenya) Virginia Wangui
- (Rwanda) Regine Mukayiranga
- (Tanzania) Mary Selemani
- (Tanzania) Zawadi Yusuf
- (Uganda) Immaculate Ongiera

== Draw ==
The draw was held on 30 July 2026 at the Amahoro Stadium Conference Hall in Kigali, Rwanda.

Group A	Group B	Group C
(Rwanda) Rayon Sports; (South Sudan) Yei Joint Stars; (Zanzibar) Mafunzo; (Eritrea) Denden FC	(Ethiopia) CBE; (Uganda) Kawempe Muslim; (Djibouti) FC UJECO	(Tanzania) Simba Queens; Kenya Police Bullets; (Burundi) Top Girls Academy

== Group stage ==
Tiebreakers

Teams were ranked according to points (3 points for a win, 1 point for a draw, 0 points for a loss), and if tied on points, the following tiebreaking criteria were applied, in the order given, to determine the rankings:

1. Points in head-to-head matches among tied teams;
2. Goal difference in head-to-head matches among tied teams;
3. Goals scored in head-to-head matches among tied teams;
4. If more than two teams were tied, and after applying all head-to-head criteria above, a subset of teams were still tied, all head-to-head criteria above were reapplied exclusively to this subset of teams;
5. Goal difference in all group matches;
6. Goals scored in all group matches;
7. Disciplinary points (yellow card = 1 point, red card as a result of two yellow cards = 3 points, direct red card = 3 points, yellow card followed by direct red card = 4 points);
8. Drawing of lots.

=== Group A ===
Pos	Team	Pld	W	D	L	GF	GA	GD	Pts	Qualification
1	(South Sudan) Yei Joint Stars	3	2	1	0	5	1	+4	7	Semi-finals
2	(Rwanda) Rayon Sports (H)	3	1	2	0	4	1	+3	5	
3	(Zanzibar) Mafunzo	3	1	1	1	9	1	+8	4	
4	(Eritrea) Denden	3	0	0	3	0	15	−15	0	

Source: CECAFA
Rules for classification: Tiebreakers
(H) Hosts
21 August 2026
13:00

Yei Joint Stars (South Sudan)	3–0	(Eritrea) Denden
Esther Wani Poni 2'; Grace Aluka 52', 74'

Kigali Pelé Stadium, Kigali
Referee: Yordanos Mulugeta (Ethiopia)
21 August 2026
16:00

Rayon Sports (Rwanda)	0–0	(Zanzibar) Mafunzo

Kigali Pelé Stadium, Kigali
Referee: Josphine Wanjiru (Kenya)

23 August 2026
13:00

Mafunzo (Zanzibar)	0–1	(South Sudan) Yei Joint Stars
		Mary Anger Bol 68'

Kigali Pelé Stadium, Kigali
Referee: Joselyne Nsabimana (Burundi)
23 August 2026
16:00

Denden (Eritrea)	0–3	(Rwanda) Rayon Sports
		Regine Ihirwe 17'; Jeannette Ukwinkunda 18'; Evelyne Ishimwe Mizero 90+2'

Kigali Pelé Stadium, Kigali

25 August 2026
15:00

Mafunzo (Zanzibar)	9–0	(Eritrea) Denden
Jackline Kulusanga 10', 25', 60', 80'; Cynthia Shilwatso 32', 61'; Leunina Ngonapipi 55'; Judicaël Ouoba 72'; Mounifatou Helbi 84'

FERWAFA Pitch, Kigali
25 August 2026
15:00

Rayon Sports (Rwanda)	1–1	(South Sudan) Yei Joint Stars
Jeannette Ukwinkunda 48'		Moureen Nankinga 79'

Kigali Pelé Stadium, Kigali

=== Group B ===
Pos	Team	Pld	W	D	L	GF	GA	GD	Pts	Qualification
1	(Uganda) Kawempe Muslim Ladies	2	2	0	0	9	0	+9	6	Semi-finals
2	(Ethiopia) CBE	2	1	0	1	11	1	+10	3	Semi-finals
3	(Djibouti) UJECO	2	0	0	2	0	19	−19	0	

Source: CECAFA
Rules for classification: Tiebreakers
22 August 2026
13:00

CBE (Ethiopia)	11–0	(Djibouti) UJECO
Emush Daniel 5', 17', 36', 60', 73'; Tarikuwa Debiso 23'; Rediet Assresahagn 30', 90+1'; Etsegenet Girma 45+2'; Lidiya Eyasu 66', 76'

Kigali Pelé Stadium, Kigali

24 August 2026
16:00

Kawempe Muslim Ladies (Uganda)	1–0	(Ethiopia) CBE
Agnes Nabukenya 11' (pen.)

Kigali Pelé Stadium, Kigali
Referee: Emmanuela Akoo (South Sudan)

26 August 2026
13:00

UJECO (Djibouti)	0–8	(Uganda) Kawempe Muslim Ladies
		Nesima Elemo 14' (o.g.); Jovia Nakagolo 20', 26'; Samalie Nakacwa 28'; Agnes Nabukenya 34'; Latifah Nakasi 40', 90'; Cecilia Apiding 54'

Kigali Pelé Stadium, Kigali
Referee: Stella Sebit (South Sudan)

=== Group C ===
Pos	Team	Pld	W	D	L	GF	GA	GD	Pts	Qualification
1	Kenya Police Bullets	2	2	0	0	5	2	+3	6	Semi-finals
2	(Tanzania) Simba Queens	2	1	0	1	3	2	+1	3	
3	(Burundi) Top Girls Academy	2	0	0	2	1	5	−4	0	

Source: CECAFA
Rules for classification: Tiebreakers
22 August 2026
16:00

Simba Queens (Tanzania)	2–0	(Burundi) Top Girls Academy
Aisha Mnunka 63'; Kusamfula Musakanda 80'

Kigali Pelé Stadium, Kigali
Referee: Diana Murungi (Uganda)

24 August 2026
13:00

Kenya Police Bullets	2–1	(Tanzania) Simba Queens
Faith Mboya 16'; Martha Amunyolete 78'		Senaf Wakuma 70'

Kigali Pelé Stadium, Kigali
Referee: Aline Umutoni (Rwanda)

26 August 2026
16:00

Top Girls Academy (Burundi)	1–3	Kenya Police Bullets
Irène Tuyishemeze 82'		Martha Amunyolete 17', 69'; Eglay Mukhwana 54'

Kigali Pelé Stadium, Kigali

=== Ranking of second-placed teams ===
For Group A, which consisted of four teams, results against the fourth-placed team were excluded in calculating the ranking.

Pos	Grp	Team	Pld	W	D	L	GF	GA	GD	Pts	Qualification
1	B	(Ethiopia) CBE	2	1	0	1	11	1	+10	3	Semi-finals
2	C	(Tanzania) Simba Queens	2	1	0	1	3	2	+1	3	
3	A	(Rwanda) Rayon Sports	2	0	2	0	1	1	0	2	

Source: CECAFA
Rules for classification: Tiebreakers

== Knockout stage ==
=== Bracket ===
Semi-finals
29 August – Kigali
(South Sudan) Yei Joint Stars	0
Kenya Police Bullets	5
29 August – Kigali
(Uganda) Kawempe Muslim Ladies	3
(Ethiopia) CBE	0

Final
31 August – Kigali
Kenya Police Bullets	0
(Uganda) Kawempe Muslim Ladies (a.e.t.)	1
Third-place play-off
31 August – Kigali
(South Sudan) Yei Joint Stars	1
(Ethiopia) CBE	6

=== Semi-finals ===
29 August 2026
13:00

Kawempe Muslim Ladies (Uganda)	3–0	(Ethiopia) CBE
Jovia Nakagolo 16'; Tigist Adane 54' (o.g.); Agnes Nabukenya 72'

Kigali Pelé Stadium, Kigali
Referee: Josphine Wanjiku (Kenya)

29 August 2026
16:30

Yei Joint Stars (South Sudan)	0–5	Kenya Police Bullets
		Tereza Engesha 20'; Martha Amunyolete 34', 74'; Lorna Nyabuto 55'; Rebecca Okwaro 88'

Kigali Pelé Stadium, Kigali
Referee: Aline Umutoni (Rwanda)

=== Third-place play-off ===
31 August 2026

Yei Joint Stars (South Sudan)	1–6	(Ethiopia) CBE
Moureen Nankinga 36'		Etsegenet Girma 32'; Beshadu Tadese 41'; Mahelet Mitiku 47'; Emush Daniel 74'; Mihiret Ayele 77'; Rediet Matios 84'

Kigali Pelé Stadium, Kigali

=== Final ===
31 August 2026
16:00

Kenya Police Bullets	0–1 (a.e.t.)	(Uganda) Kawempe Muslim Ladies
		Agnes Nabukenya 100'

Kigali Pelé Stadium, Kigali
Referee: Emmanuela Akoo (South Sudan)

== Awards and statistics ==
There have been 63 goals scored in 16 matches, for an average of 3.94 goals per match (as of 31 August 2026).

Rank	Player	Team	Goals
1	(Ethiopia) Emush Daniel	(Ethiopia) CBE	6
2	(Tanzania) Jackline Kulusanga	(Zanzibar) Mafunzo	4
2	(Kenya) Martha Amunyolete	Kenya Police Bullets	4
2	(Uganda) Jovia Nakagolo	(Uganda) Kawempe Muslim Ladies	4
5	(Uganda) Agnes Nabukenya	(Uganda) Kawempe Muslim Ladies	3
5	(Ethiopia) Etsegenet Girma	(Ethiopia) CBE	3
7	(Ethiopia) Rediet Assresahagn	(Ethiopia) CBE	2
7	(Ethiopia) Lidiya Eyasu	(Ethiopia) CBE	2
7	(Zanzibar) Cynthia Shilwatso	(Zanzibar) Mafunzo	2
7	(Rwanda) Jeannette Ukwinkunda	(Rwanda) Rayon Sports	2
7	(South Sudan) Grace Aluka	(South Sudan) Yei Joint Stars	2
7	(Uganda) Latifah Nakasi	(Uganda) Kawempe Muslim Ladies	2
7	(Kenya) Tereza Engesha	Kenya Police Bullets	2
7	(Kenya) Eglay Mukhwana	Kenya Police Bullets	2
7	(South Sudan) Moureen Nankinga	(South Sudan) Yei Joint Stars	2
16	34 players	Various	1
