= 2024 CAF Women's Champions League qualification =

Tournament details
- Host countries: Algeria (North Zone); Sierra Leone (West A Zone); Ivory Coast (West B Zone); DR Congo (Central Zone); Ethiopia (Central-East Zone); Malawi (South Zone)
- Dates: 1 –30 August 2024

Tournament statistics
- Matches played: 66
- Goals scored: 207 (3.14 per match)
- Top scorers: (Burundi) Sandrine Niyonkuru (5 goals- North Zone); (Guinea) Bountou Sylla (4 goals - West A Zone); (Nigeria) Emem Essien (6 goals - West B Zone); (Democratic Republic of the Congo) Esther Dikisha (4 goals - Central Zone); (Ethiopia) Senaf Wakuma (6 goals - Central-East Zone); (Eswatini) Siphilisiwe Ndlovu (South Africa) Bongeka Gamede (3 goals each - South Zone)
- All statistics correct as of 30 August 2024.

Qualification for the 2024 CAF Women's Champions League began on 1 August and ended on 30 August 2024.

Qualification was made up of 6 sub-confederation qualifying tournaments which will be starting on the 1st of August 2024. Qualification will finish in September with the participating teams reduced to the final 8, consisting of one winning team each from the 6 CAF sub-confederations, the tournament's defending champions, and the host nation's league-winning team. These 8 teams would proceed to the main tournament phases which had not been chosen yet.

== Teams ==
All participating teams qualified for the qualification phase by winning their respective national league titles and had their club licensing applications accepted by CAF. A total of 36 (out of 54) countries have a participant club in this edition.

Key to colours
Winners and advance to group stage

UNAF
Team	Part.
(Algeria) CF Akbou	(1st)
(Egypt) Tutankhamun FC	(1st)
(Morocco) AS FAR	(4th)
(Tunisia) ASF Sousse	(2nd)

WAFU A
Team	Part.
(The Gambia) Red Scorpion WFC	(1st)
(Liberia) Determine Girls	(4th)
(Mali) AS Mandé	(4th)
(Senegal) Aigles de la Médina	(1st)
(Sierra Leone) Mogbwemo Queens	(2nd)

WAFU B
Team	Part.
(Benin) Ainonvi FC	(1st)
(Burkina Faso) AO Etincelle	(1st)
(Ivory Coast) FC Inter d'Abidjan	(1st)
(Ghana) Hasaacas Ladies	(2nd)
(Niger) AS GNN	(1st)
(Nigeria) Edo Queens	(1st)
(Togo) ASKO Kara	(1st)

UNIFFAC
Team	Part.
(Cameroon) Lekié FF	(1st)
(Republic of the Congo) CSM Diables Noirs	(1st)
(Democratic Republic of the Congo) TP Mazembe	(3rd)
(Equatorial Guinea) Atlético Malabo	(1st)

CECAFA
Team	Part.
(Burundi) PVP Buyenzi	(2nd)
(Djibouti) FAD Club	(3rd)
(Ethiopia) CBE	(4th)
Kenya Police Bullets	(1st)
(Rwanda) Rayon Sports	(1st)
(South Sudan) Yei Joint Stars	(4th)
(Tanzania) Simba Queens	(3rd)
(Uganda) Kawempe Muslim LFC	(1st)

COSAFA
Team	Part.
(Botswana) Gaborone United Ladies	(2nd)
(Eswatini) Young Buffaloes	(3rd)
(Malawi) Ascent Academy	(1st)
(Mozambique) UD Lichinga	(1st)
(Namibia) Ongos SC	(2nd)
(South Africa) UWC Ladies	(1st)
(Zambia) Green Buffaloes	(4th)
(Zimbabwe) Herentals Queens	(1st)

Associations which did not enter a team:

- Angola
- Cape Verde
- Central African Republic
- Chad
- Comoros
- Eritrea
- Gabon
- Guinea
- Guinea-Bissau
- Lesotho
- Libya
- Madagascar
- Mauritania
- Mauritius
- São Tomé and Príncipe
- Seychelles
- Somalia
- Sudan
- Zanzibar (Warriors Queens withdrawn)

== Schedule ==
The schedule of the competition was as follows

Schedule for 2024 CAF Women's Champions League qualification
Zone	Date
UNAF	24–30 August 2024
WAFU A	1–11 August 2024
WAFU B	10–23 August 2024
UNIFFAC	19–23 August 2024
CECAFA	17–29 August 2024
COSAFA	15–24 August 2024

== Main Qualification Phase ==
=== UNAF ===
Pos	Team	Pld	W	D	L	GF	GA	GD	Pts	Qualification	FAR	TUT	CFA	ASF
1	(Morocco) AS FAR	3	3	0	0	10	0	+10	9	Main tournament (Note: FC Masar, who were known as Tutankhamun during the qualifiers, qualified to the finals on 15 October 2024, as the qualifiers winners AS FAR also won the Moroccan Women's Championship and automatically qualified as hosts.)	—	1–0	4–0	
2	(Egypt) Tutankhamun	3	2	0	1	11	3	+8	6	Main tournament		—	4–2	
3	(Algeria) CF Akbou (H)	3	1	0	2	6	9	−3	3				—	4–1
4	(Tunisia) ASF Sousse	3	0	0	3	1	16	−15	0		0–5	0–7		—

Source: UNAF
(H) Hosts

=== WAFU Zone A ===
Pos	Team	Pld	W	D	L	GF	GA	GD	Pts	Qualification	ADM	MOQ	DGF	RSC	ASM
1	(Senegal) Aigles de la Médina	4	2	1	1	6	5	+1	7	Main tournament			2–1	2–0	
2	(Sierra Leone) Mogbwemo Queens (H)	4	1	3	0	4	3	+1	6 (Note: Head-to-head points: Mogbwemo Queens 3, Determine Girls 0.)		2–2			0–0	0–0
3	(Liberia) Determine Girls	4	2	0	2	7	6	+1	6			1–2		2–1	3–1
4	(The Gambia) Red Scorpion	4	1	1	2	2	4	−2	4 (Note: Head-to-head points: Red Scorpion 3, AS Mandé 0.)						
5	(Mali) AS Mandé	4	1	1	2	3	4	−1	4		2–0			0–1	

Source: CAF
(H) Hosts

=== WAFU Zone B ===
==== Group stage ====
===== Group A =====
Pos	Team	Pld	W	D	L	GF	GA	GD	Pts	Qualification	AFC	FCI	ASK
1	(Benin) Ainonvi FC	2	2	0	0	4	2	+2	6	Semi-finals	—		2–1
2	(Ivory Coast) FC Inter d'Abidjan (H)	2	1	0	1	5	5	0	3	Semi-finals	1–2	—	
3	(Togo) ASKO Kara	2	0	0	2	4	6	−2	0			3–4	—

(H) Hosts

===== Group B =====
Pos	Team	Pld	W	D	L	GF	GA	GD	Pts	Qualification	EDO	AOE	HSC	ASG
1	(Nigeria) Edo Queens	3	3	0	0	9	0	+9	9	Semi-finals	—	1–0	0–3	
2	(Burkina Faso) AO Etincelle	3	1	1	1	6	2	+4	4	Semi-finals		—		1–6
3	(Ghana) Hasaacas Ladies	3	1	1	1	6	4	+2	4			0–0	—	6–1
4	(Niger) AS GNN	3	0	0	3	2	17	−15	0		0–5			—

==== Knockout stage ====
===== Semi-finals =====
Team 1	Score	Team 2
Ainonvi FC (Benin)	1–0	(Burkina Faso) AO Etincelle
Edo Queens (Nigeria)	2–1	(Ivory Coast) FC Inter d'Abidjan

===== Third place =====
Team 1	Score	Team 2
AO Etincelle (Burkina Faso)	0–1	(Ivory Coast) FC Inter d'Abidjan

===== Final =====
Team 1	Score	Team 2
Ainonvi FC (Benin)	0–3	(Nigeria) Edo Queens

=== UNIFFAC ===
Pos	Team	Pld	W	D	L	GF	GA	GD	Pts	Qualification	TPM	LFF	ATM	CDN
1	(Democratic Republic of the Congo) TP Mazembe (H)	3	2	1	0	12	1	+11	7	Main tournament	—	1–1	—	7–0
2	(Cameroon) Lekié FF	3	1	2	0	6	1	+5	5		—	—	—	0–0
3	(Equatorial Guinea) Atlético Malabo	3	1	0	2	3	11	−8	3		0–4	0–5	—	—
4	(Republic of the Congo) CSM Diables Noirs	3	0	1	2	2	10	−8	1		—	—	2–3	—

Source: UNIFFAC
(H) Hosts

=== CECAFA ===
==== Group stage ====
===== Group A =====
Pos	Team	Pld	W	D	L	GF	GA	GD	Pts	Qualification	CBE	KPB	YJS	RYS
1	(Ethiopia) CBE (H)	3	3	0	0	9	3	+6	9	Semi-finals	—	2–1		3–2
2	Kenya Police Bullets	3	1	1	1	2	2	0	4	Semi-finals		—	0–0	1–0
3	(South Sudan) Yei Joint Stars	3	1	1	1	2	5	−3	4		0–4		—	2–1
4	(Rwanda) Rayon Sport	3	0	0	3	3	6	−3	0					—

Source: CECAFA
(H) Hosts

===== Group B =====
Pos	Team	Pld	W	D	L	GF	GA	GD	Pts	Qualification	SBQ	KML	PVP	FAD
1	(Tanzania) Simba Queens	3	2	1	0	10	2	+8	7	Semi-finals	—	3–0		5–0
2	(Uganda) Kawempe Muslim Ladies	3	2	0	1	12	3	+9	6	Semi-finals		—		
3	(Burundi) PVP Buyenzi	3	0	2	1	2	4	−2	2			0–2	—	0–0
4	(Djibouti) FAD Club	3	0	1	2	0	15	−15	1					—

Source: CECAFA

==== Knockout stage ====
===== Semi-finals =====
Team 1	Score	Team 2
CBE (Ethiopia)	2–1	(Uganda) Kawempe Muslim Ladies
Simba Queens (Tanzania)	2–3	Kenya Police Bullets

===== Third place =====
Team 1	Score	Team 2
Kawempe Muslim Ladies (Uganda)	2–0	(Tanzania) Simba Queens

===== Final =====
Team 1	Score	Team 2
CBE (Ethiopia)	1–0	Kenya Police Bullets

=== COSAFA ===
==== Group stage ====
===== Group A =====
Pos	Team	Pld	W	D	L	GF	GA	GD	Pts	Qualification	UWC	HRQ	FCO	GRB
1	(South Africa) UWC Ladies	3	2	0	1	5	2	+3	6	Semi-finals	—			0–1
2	(Zimbabwe) Herentals Queens	3	2	0	1	5	3	+2	6	Semi-finals	1–2	—	3–1	
3	(Namibia) Ongos SC	3	1	0	2	3	7	−4	3 (Note: Head-to-head points: FC Ongos 3, Green Buffaloes 0.)		0–3		—	
4	(Zambia) Green Buffaloes	3	1	0	2	2	3	−1	3			0–1	1–2	—

Source: cosafa

===== Group B =====
Pos	Team	Pld	W	D	L	GF	GA	GD	Pts	Qualification	GBU	YBU	UDL	ASA
1	(Botswana) Gaborone United	3	1	2	0	4	3	+1	5	Semi-finals	—	1–1	0–0	3–2
2	(Eswatini) Young Buffaloes	3	1	1	1	6	3	+3	4	Semi-finals		—	4–0	1–2
3	(Mozambique) União Desportiva de Lichinga	3	1	1	1	1	4	−3	4				—	1–0
4	(Malawi) Ascent Soccer Academy (H)	3	1	0	2	4	5	−1	3					—

Source: COSAFA
(H) Hosts

==== Knockout stage ====
===== Semi-finals =====
Team 1	Score	Team 2
UWC Ladies (South Africa)	6–0	(Eswatini) Young Buffaloes
Gaborone United (Botswana)	1–0	(Zimbabwe) Herentals Queens

===== Final =====
Team 1	Score	Team 2
UWC Ladies (South Africa)	1–1 (9–8 p)	(Botswana) Gaborone United
