= 2024 CAF Women's Champions League CECAFA Qualifiers =

Tournament details
- Host country: Ethiopia
- City: Addis Ababa
- Dates: 17–29 August
- Teams: 8 (from 8 associations)
- Venues: 2 (in 1 host city)

Final positions
- Champions: (Ethiopia) CBE (1st title)
- Runners-up: Kenya Police Bullets
- Third place: (Uganda) Kawempe Muslim Ladies
- Fourth place: (Tanzania) Simba Queens

Tournament statistics
- Matches played: 16
- Goals scored: 51 (3.19 per match)
- Top scorer(s): (Ethiopia) Senaf Wakuma (6 goals)
- Best player: (Ethiopia) Mesay Temesgen
- Best goalkeeper: (Kenya) Annedy Kundu
- Fair play award: (Tanzania) Simba Queens

The 2024 CAF Women's Champions League CECAFA Qualifiers is the 4th edition of CAF Women's Champions League CECAFA Qualifiers tournament organized by the CECAFA for the women's clubs of association nations. This edition will be held from 17 to 23 August 2024 in Ethiopia.

The winners of the tournament qualify for the 2024 CAF Women's Champions League final tournament.

== Participating clubs ==
The following eight teams contested in the qualifying tournament.

Team	Appearances	Previous best performance
(Ethiopia) CBE (hosts)	4th	Runner up (2021, 2023)
(Burundi) PVP Buyenzi	2nd	Group stage (2021)
(Djibouti) FAD Club	3rd	Group stage (2021, 2023)
Kenya Police Bullets	1st	Debut
(Rwanda) Rayon Sports	1st	Debut
(South Sudan) Yei Joint Stars	4th	Group stage (2021, 2022, 2023)
(Tanzania) Simba Queens	3rd	Champion (2022)
(Uganda) Kawempe Muslim LFC	1st	Debut

== Venues ==
2024 CAF Women's Champions League CECAFA Qualifiers is located in Ethiopia	Addis Ababa	
2024 CAF Women's Champions League CECAFA Qualifiers is located in Ethiopia	Addis Ababa Stadium	Abebe Bikila Stadium
2024 CAF Women's Champions League CECAFA Qualifiers is located in Ethiopia	Capacity: 35,000	Capacity: 25,000

== Draw ==
The draw for this edition of the tournament was held on 24 July 2024 at 13:00 UTC+2 (13:00 CAT) in Egypt. The seven teams were drawn into 2 groups with teams finishing first and second in the groups qualifying for the knockout stages.

Seeded	Unseeded
(Ethiopia) CBE (hosts); (Tanzania) Simba Queens	(Uganda) Kawempe Muslim LFC; (Rwanda) Rayon Sports; Kenya Police Bullets; (South Sudan) Yei Joint Stars; (Burundi) PVP Buyenzi; (Djibouti) FAD Club

== Group stage ==
Tiebreakers

Teams are ranked according to points (3 points for a win, 1 point for a draw, 0 points for a loss), and if tied on points, the following tiebreaking criteria are applied, in the order given, to determine the rankings.

1. Points in head-to-head matches among tied teams;
2. Goal difference in head-to-head matches among tied teams;
3. Goals scored in head-to-head matches among tied teams;
4. If more than two teams are tied, and after applying all head-to-head criteria above, a subset of teams are still tied, all head-to-head criteria above are reapplied exclusively to this subset of teams;
5. Goal difference in all group matches;
6. Goals scored in all group matches;
7. Penalty shoot-out if only two teams are tied and they met in the last round of the group;
8. Disciplinary points (yellow card = 1 point, red card as a result of two yellow cards = 3 points, direct red card = 3 points, yellow card followed by direct red card = 4 points);
9. Drawing of lots.

=== Group A ===
Pos	Team	Pld	W	D	L	GF	GA	GD	Pts	Qualification	CBE	KPB	YJS	RYS
1	(Ethiopia) CBE (H)	3	3	0	0	9	3	+6	9	Semi-finals	—	2–1		3–2
2	Kenya Police Bullets	3	1	1	1	2	2	0	4	Semi-finals		—	0–0	1–0
3	(South Sudan) Yei Joint Stars	3	1	1	1	2	5	−3	4		0–4		—	2–1
4	(Rwanda) Rayon Sport	3	0	0	3	3	6	−3	0					—

Source: CECAFA
(H) Hosts
17 August 2024
15:00

CBE (Ethiopia)	3–2	(Rwanda) Rayon Sport
Wakuma 1'; Kalsa 41', 48'		Ukwikunda 65'; Mukandayisenga 77'

Addis Ababa Stadium
18 August 2024
15:00

Yei Joint Stars (South Sudan)	0–0	Kenya Police Bullets

Addis Ababa Stadium

20 August 2024
12:00

Yei Joint Stars (South Sudan)	0–4	(Ethiopia) CBE
		Wakuma 1', 21'; Kalsa 19' (pen.); Yukura 37'

Addis Ababa Stadium
20 August 2024
15:00

Kenya Police Bullets	1–0	(Rwanda) Rayon Sport
Anyetu 6'

Abebe Bikila Stadium

22 August 2024
15:00

CBE (Ethiopia)	2–1	Kenya Police Bullets
Wakuma 2', 58'		Akinyi 32'

Abebe Bikila Stadium
22 August 2024
15:00

Yei Joint Stars (South Sudan)	2–1	(Rwanda) Rayon Sport
Maduok 10'; Mogga 44'		Ukwinkunda 39'

Addis Ababa Stadium

=== Group B ===
Pos	Team	Pld	W	D	L	GF	GA	GD	Pts	Qualification	SBQ	KML	PVP	FAD
1	(Tanzania) Simba Queens	3	2	1	0	10	2	+8	7	Semi-finals	—	3–0		5–0
2	(Uganda) Kawempe Muslim Ladies	3	2	0	1	12	3	+9	6	Semi-finals		—		
3	(Burundi) PVP Buyenzi	3	0	2	1	2	4	−2	2			0–2	—	0–0
4	(Djibouti) FAD Club	3	0	1	2	0	15	−15	1					—

Source: CECAFA
19 August 2024
12:00

PVP Buyenzi (Burundi)	0–2	(Uganda) Kawempe Muslim Ladies
		Nabukenya 32', 59'

Addis Ababa Stadium
19 August 2024
15:00

Simba Queens (Tanzania)	5–0	(Djibouti) FAD Club
Shikangwa 24'; Wambui 29'; Rashid 75', 80', 89'

Addis Ababa Stadium
Referee: Khadmallah Angato Koko (Sudan)

21 August 2024
12:00

Simba Queens (Tanzania)	3–0	(Uganda) Kawempe Muslim Ladies
Corazone 65'; Shikangwa 69'; Wambui 76'

Addis Ababa Stadium
21 August 2024
12:00

PVP Buyenzi (Burundi)	0–0	(Djibouti) FAD Club

Addis Ababa Stadium

23 August 2024
15:00

Kawempe Muslim Ladies (Uganda)	10–0	(Djibouti) FAD Club
Nabirye 11', 45'; Nandago 22', 34', 51' (pen.), 68', 79'; Kampi 53'; Nakato 56'; Kabacurezi 85'

Addis Ababa Stadium
23 August 2024
15:00

Simba Queens (Tanzania)	2–2	(Burundi) PVP Buyenzi
Shikangwa 7'; Corazone 18'		Bizimana 1'; Ngoyi 61' (o.g.)

Abebe Bikila Stadium

== Knockout stage ==
=== Semi-finals ===
26 August 2024
12:00

CBE (Ethiopia)	2–1	(Uganda) Kawempe Muslim Ladies
Temesgen 45'; Asfaw 89'		Nabirye 60'

Addis Ababa Stadium
26 August 2024
15:30

Simba Queens (Tanzania)	2–3	Kenya Police Bullets
Corazone 38', 56'		Jira 29'; Wacera 61'; Akinyi 82'

Addis Ababa Stadium

=== Third place match ===
29 August 2024
12:00

Kawempe Muslim Ladies (Uganda)	2–0	(Tanzania) Simba Queens
Nabuto 19'; Nabukenya 50'

Addis Ababa Stadium

=== Final ===
29 August 2024
15:00

CBE (Ethiopia)	1–0	Kenya Police Bullets
Wakuma 79'

Addis Ababa Stadium

== Awards and statistics ==
=== Goalscorers ===
There have been 51 goals scored in 16 matches, for an average of 3.19 goals per match (as of 29 August 2024).

Rank	Player	Team	Goals
1	(Ethiopia) Senaf Wakuma	(Ethiopia) CBE	6
2	(Kenya) Vivian Corazone	(Tanzania) Simba Queens	4
3	(Tanzania) Asha Rashid	(Tanzania) Simba Queens	3
3	(Ethiopia) Argesh Kalsa	(Ethiopia) CBE	3
3	Hadijah Nandago	(Uganda) Kawempe Muslim	3
3	(Kenya) Jentrix Shikangwa	(Tanzania) Simba Queens	3
3	Shadia Nabirye	(Uganda) Kawempe Muslim	3
3	(Uganda) Agnes Nabukenya	(Uganda) Kawempe Muslim	3
9	(Kenya) Elizabeth Wambui	(Tanzania) Simba Queens	2
9	(Rwanda) Ukwikunda Jeanette	(Rwanda) Rayon Sport	2
9	Rebecca Akinyi Okwaro	Kenya Police Bullets	2
12	(Ethiopia) Tarikwa Yukura	(Ethiopia) CBE	1
12	Mesay Temesgen	(Ethiopia) CBE	1
12	Emebet Asfaw	(Ethiopia) CBE	1
12	(Rwanda) Jeanne Mukandayisenga	(Rwanda) Rayon Sport	1
12	Diana Wacera	Kenya Police Bullets	1
12	Lucy Kwekwe Jira	Kenya Police Bullets	1
12	(Kenya) Purity Anyetu	Kenya Police Bullets	1
12	Aniet Wek Maduok	(South Sudan) Yei Joint Stars	1
12	Modong Jeska Simaya Mogga	(South Sudan) Yei Joint Stars	1
12	Halimah Kampi	(Uganda) Kawempe Muslim	1
12	Rebecca Nakato	(Uganda) Kawempe Muslim	1
12	Mary Kabacurezi	(Uganda) Kawempe Muslim	1
12	Sumayo Nabuto	(Uganda) Kawempe Muslim	1
12	Rukiya Bizimana	(Burundi) PVP Buyenzi	1

==== own goal ====
Rank	Player	Team	Goals
1	Danny Ngoyi	Simba Queens (Tanzania)	1
