= CAF Women's Champions League records and statistics =

Football competition statistics

This page lists records and statistics of the CAF Women's Champions League, from its inaugural edition in 2021 to the 2026 final. Statistics relate to the final tournament unless otherwise stated.

== General performance ==
=== Winners by club ===
Rank	Club	Winners	Runners-up	3rd Places	4th Places	Top 4
1	(Morocco) AS FAR	3 (2022, 2025, 2026)	1 (2024)	2 (2021, 2023)	0	6
2	(South Africa) Mamelodi Sundowns	2 (2021, 2023)	2 (2022, 2026)	0	0	4
3	(Democratic Republic of the Congo) TP Mazembe	1 (2024)	0	1 (2025)	0	2
4	(Ghana) Hasaacas Ladies	0	1 (2021)	0	0	1
4	(Morocco) SC Casablanca	0	1 (2023)	0	0	1
4	(Ivory Coast) ASEC Mimosas	0	1 (2025)	0	0	1
7	(Egypt) FC Masar	0	0	1 (2024)	1 (2025)	2
8	(Nigeria) Bayelsa Queens	0	0	1 (2022)	0	1
8	(Cameroon) Lekié FF	0	0	1 (2026)	0	1
10	(Equatorial Guinea) Malabo Kings	0	0	0	1 (2021)	1
10	(Tanzania) Simba Queens	0	0	0	1 (2022)	1
10	(Ghana) Ampem Darkoa	0	0	0	1 (2023)	1
10	(Nigeria) Edo Queens	0	0	0	1 (2024)	1
10	(Uganda) Kawempe Muslim Ladies	0	0	0	1 (2026)	1

=== By nation ===
Nation	Winners	Runners-up	3rd Places	4th places	Winner	Runners-up	3rd Place	4th place
Morocco	3	2	2	0	AS FAR (3)	SC Casablanca (1) AS FAR (1)	AS FAR (2)	
South Africa	2	2	0	0	Mamelodi Sundowns (2)	Mamelodi Sundowns (2)		
DR Congo	1	0	1	0	TP Mazembe (1)		TP Mazembe (1)	
Ghana	0	1	0	1		Hasaacas Ladies (1)		Ampem Darkoa (1)
Ivory Coast	0	1	0	0		ASEC Mimosas (1)		
Nigeria	0	0	1	1			Bayelsa Queens (1)	Edo Queens (1)
Egypt	0	0	1	1			FC Masar (1)	FC Masar (1)
Cameroon	0	0	1	0			Lekié FF (1)	
Equatorial Guinea	0	0	0	1				Malabo Kings (1)
Tanzania	0	0	0	1				Simba Queens (1)
Uganda	0	0	0	1				Kawempe Muslim Ladies (1)

=== Performances by region ===
Federation (Region)	Clubs Winners	Clubs Runners-up	Titles
UNAF (North Africa)	AS FAR (3)	SC Casablanca (1), AS FAR (1)	3
COSAFA (Southern Africa)	Mamelodi Sundowns (2)	Mamelodi Sundowns (2)	2
UNIFFAC (Central Africa)	TP Mazembe (1)		1
WAFU (West Africa)		Hasaacas Ladies (1), ASEC Mimosas (1)	0
CECAFA (East Africa)			0

== Number of participating clubs since inception ==
Nation	No.	Clubs	Seasons
Equatorial Guinea (3)	1	Malabo Kings	2021
Equatorial Guinea (3)	1	Huracanes	2023
Equatorial Guinea (3)	1	FC 15 de Agosto	2025
Nigeria (3)	1	Edo Queens	2024
Nigeria (3)	1	Rivers Angels	2021
Nigeria (3)	1	Bayelsa Queens	2022
Morocco (3)	6	AS FAR	2021, 2022, 2023, 2024, 2025, 2026
Morocco (3)	1	SC Casablanca	2023
Morocco (3)	1	FUS Rabat	2026
South Africa (2)	5	Mamelodi Sundowns	2021, 2022, 2023, 2024, 2026
South Africa (2)	1	UWC Ladies	2024
Egypt (2)	3	FC Masar	2024, 2025, 2026
Egypt (2)	2	Wadi Degla	2021, 2022
Mali (2)	2	AS Mandé	2021, 2023
Mali (2)	2	USFAS Bamako	2025, 2026
Ghana (2)	1	Hasaacas Ladies	2021
Ghana (2)	2	Ampem Darkoa	2023, 2026
Ivory Coast (2)	1	Athlético F.C. d'Abidjan	2023
Ivory Coast (2)	1	ASEC Mimosas	2025
Tanzania (2)	2	JKT Queens	2023, 2025
Tanzania (2)	1	Simba Queens	2022
(Democratic Republic of the Congo) DR Congo (1)	3	TP Mazembe	2022, 2024, 2025
Kenya (1)	1	Vihiga Queens	2021
Liberia (1)	1	Determine Girls	2022
Zambia (1)	1	Green Buffaloes	2022
Botswana (1)	1	Gaborone United	2025
Senegal (1)	1	Aigles de la Médina	2024
Ethiopia (1)	1	CBE	2024
Cameroon (1)	1	Lekié FF	2026
Uganda (1)	1	Kawempe Muslim Ladies	2026

== All-time club ranking ==
As of 15 November 2026

Only matches in the final tournament are included. Three points are awarded for a win and one for a draw. Matches decided by penalty shoot-outs are treated as draws; shoot-out goals are excluded.

Rank	Club	Appearances	Titles	Pts	Pld	W	D	L	GF	GA	GD
1	(Morocco) AS FAR	6	3	66	30	21	3	6	53	17	+36
2	(South Africa) Mamelodi Sundowns	5	2	51	23	16	3	4	41	13	+28
3	(Democratic Republic of the Congo) TP Mazembe	3	1	25	13	8	1	4	22	13	+9
4	(Egypt) FC Masar	3	0	17	13	4	5	4	15	10	+5
5	(Ghana) Ampem Darkoa	2	0	13	8	4	1	3	14	13	+1
6	(Ivory Coast) ASEC Mimosas	1	0	10	5	3	1	1	8	3	+5
7	(Ghana) Hasaacas Ladies	1	0	10	5	3	1	1	10	6	+4
8	(Nigeria) Bayelsa Queens	1	0	9	5	3	0	2	7	3	+4
9	(Nigeria) Edo Queens	1	0	8	5	2	2	1	6	4	+2
10	(Cameroon) Lekié FF	1	0	7	5	2	1	2	8	4	+4
11	(Tanzania) Simba Queens	1	0	6	5	2	0	3	4	3	+1
12	(Uganda) Kawempe Muslim Ladies	1	0	6	5	2	0	3	8	13	-5
13	(Morocco) SC Casablanca	1	0	5	5	1	2	2	7	8	-1
14	(Equatorial Guinea) Malabo Kings	1	0	5	5	1	2	2	6	7	-1
15	(Mali) AS Mandé	2	0	5	6	1	2	3	6	10	-4
16	(Tanzania) JKT Queens	2	0	5	6	1	2	3	5	12	-7
17	(Egypt) Wadi Degla	2	0	4	6	1	1	4	5	15	-10
18	(Mali) USFAS Bamako	2	0	4	6	1	1	4	4	18	-14
19	(Zambia) Green Buffaloes	1	0	3	3	1	0	2	5	4	+1
20	(Nigeria) Rivers Angels	1	0	3	3	1	0	2	4	4	0
21	(South Africa) UWC Ladies	1	0	3	3	1	0	2	2	4	-2
22	(Kenya) Vihiga Queens	1	0	3	3	1	0	2	2	5	-3
23	(Equatorial Guinea) Huracanes	1	0	1	3	0	1	2	2	5	-3
24	(Ivory Coast) Athlético F.C. d'Abidjan	1	0	1	3	0	1	2	2	6	-4
25	(Morocco) FUS Rabat	1	0	1	3	0	1	2	0	6	-6
26	(Botswana) Gaborone United	1	0	1	3	0	1	2	0	7	-7
27	(Ethiopia) CBE	1	0	0	3	0	0	3	1	9	-8
28	(Equatorial Guinea) FC 15 de Agosto	1	0	0	3	0	0	3	1	9	-8
29	(Liberia) Determine Girls	1	0	0	3	0	0	3	0	8	-8
30	(Senegal) Aigles de la Médina	1	0	0	3	0	0	3	0	9	-9
Total		48	6	272	192	80	32	80	248	248	0

=== 2026 tournament records ===
Club	Pts	Pld	W	D	L	GF	GA	GD
(Morocco) AS FAR	12	5	4	0	1	14	4	10
(South Africa) Mamelodi Sundowns	10	5	3	1	1	10	5	5
(Cameroon) Lekié FF	7	5	2	1	2	8	4	4
(Ghana) Ampem Darkoa	6	3	2	0	1	7	4	3
(Uganda) Kawempe Muslim Ladies	6	5	2	0	3	8	13	-5
(Egypt) FC Masar	4	3	1	1	1	4	2	2
(Morocco) FUS Rabat	1	3	0	1	2	0	6	-6
(Mali) USFAS Bamako	0	3	0	0	3	1	14	-13

== Participation by nation ==
Nation	Different clubs	Appearances	Titles	Points	Goals for	Goals against
Morocco	3	8	3	72	60	31
South Africa	2	6	2	54	43	17
DR Congo	1	3	1	25	22	13
Egypt	2	5	0	21	20	25
Mali	2	4	0	9	10	28
Equatorial Guinea	3	3	0	6	9	21
Ghana	2	3	0	23	24	19
Nigeria	3	3	0	20	17	11
Tanzania	2	3	0	11	9	15
Ivory Coast	2	2	0	11	10	9
Botswana	1	1	0	1	0	7
Cameroon	1	1	0	7	8	4
Ethiopia	1	1	0	0	1	9
Kenya	1	1	0	3	2	5
Liberia	1	1	0	0	0	8
Senegal	1	1	0	0	0	9
Uganda	1	1	0	6	8	13
Zambia	1	1	0	3	5	4
Total	30	48	6	272	248	248

== Player records ==
=== All-time top scorers ===
As of 15 November 2026

Selected players with at least three goals in the final tournament.

Rank	Player	Goals	Club
1	(Morocco) Doha El Madani	8	AS FAR
2	(Morocco) Fatima Tagnaout	7	AS FAR
2	(South Africa) Melinda Kgadiete	7	Mamelodi Sundowns
2	(Botswana) Refilwe Tholakele	7	Mamelodi Sundowns
5	(Morocco) Ibtissam Jraïdi	6	AS FAR
5	(Democratic Republic of the Congo) Marlène Kasaj	6	TP Mazembe
5	(Lesotho) Boitumelo Rabale	6	Mamelodi Sundowns
8	(Morocco) Ghizlane Chebbak	5	AS FAR
8	(Morocco) Sanaâ Mssoudy	5	AS FAR
8	(Ghana) Evelyn Badu	5	Hasaacas Ladies
8	(South Africa) Lelona Daweti	5	Mamelodi Sundowns
12	(Morocco) Imane Touriss	4	AS FAR
12	(Uganda) Agnes Nabukenya	4	Kawempe Muslim Ladies
12	(Morocco) Safa Banouk	4	AS FAR
12	(Democratic Republic of the Congo) Merveille Kanjinga	4	TP Mazembe
16	(Morocco) Najat Badri	3	AS FAR
16	(Ivory Coast) Ami Diallo	3	ASEC Mimosas
16	(Nigeria) Emem Essien	3	Edo Queens
16	(Ghana) N-Yanyimaya Gnabekan	3	Ampem Darkoa
16	(Mali) Oumou Kone	3	AS Mandé
16	(South Africa) Ronnel Donnelly	3	Mamelodi Sundowns
16	(Ivory Coast) Stéphanie Gbogou	3	Malabo Kings
16	(Egypt) Yassmin Zezo	3	FC Masar

=== All-time clean sheets ===
As of 15 November 2026

Rank	Goalkeeper	Clean sheets	Club
1	(Morocco) Khadija Er-Rmichi	18	AS FAR
2	(South Africa) Andile Dlamini	14	Mamelodi Sundowns
3	(Egypt) Habiba Sabry	7	FC Masar
4	(Democratic Republic of the Congo) Fideline Ngoy	5	TP Mazembe
5	(Nigeria) Omini Oyono	3	Edo Queens

== Manager records ==
=== Winning managers ===
Season	Winning manager	Club	Ref
2021	(South Africa) Jerry Tshabalala	(South Africa) Mamelodi Sundowns	
2022	(Morocco) Mohamed Amine Alioua	(Morocco) AS FAR	
2023	(South Africa) Jerry Tshabalala	(South Africa) Mamelodi Sundowns	
2024	(Morocco) Lamia Boumehdi	(Democratic Republic of the Congo) TP Mazembe	
2025	(Morocco) Mohamed Amine Alioua	(Morocco) AS FAR	
2026	(Morocco) Hicham El Idrissi	(Morocco) AS FAR	

== Team records ==
As of 15 November 2026

=== Tournament position ===
- Most titles: 3 – (Morocco) AS FAR (2022, 2025 and 2026).
- Most consecutive titles: 2 – (Morocco) AS FAR (2025 and 2026).
- Most finals: 4 – (Morocco) AS FAR and (South Africa) Mamelodi Sundowns.
- Most consecutive finals: 3 – (Morocco) AS FAR (2024–2026) and (South Africa) Mamelodi Sundowns (2021–2023).
- Most top-three finishes: 6 – (Morocco) AS FAR.
- Most semi-final appearances: 6 – (Morocco) AS FAR.
- Most tournament appearances: 6 – (Morocco) AS FAR.
- Most matches played: 30 – (Morocco) AS FAR.
- Most wins: 21 – (Morocco) AS FAR.
- Most goals scored: 53 – (Morocco) AS FAR.
- Most points: 66 – (Morocco) AS FAR.

=== Match records ===
- Largest winning margin in a final: (Morocco) AS FAR 4–0 (South Africa) Mamelodi Sundowns (2022).
- Largest group-stage win: (Morocco) AS FAR 6–0 (Mali) USFAS Bamako (2026).

== National records ==
- Most titles: Morocco – 3.
- Most tournament entries: Morocco – 8.
- Most different participating clubs: 3 – Morocco, Nigeria and Equatorial Guinea.
- Most consecutive finals: Morocco – 5 (2022–2026).
- Most podium finishes: Morocco – 7.
- Most consecutive editions with a podium finish: Morocco – 6 (2021–2026).

== Additional player records ==
- Most goals in a single edition: 6 – (Morocco) Ibtissam Jraïdi (2022) and (Morocco) Doha El Madani (2024).
- Most goals in a final: 3 – (Morocco) Ibtissam Jraïdi (2022).
- First first-half hat-trick: (South Africa) Ronnel Donnelly (29th, 35th and 37th minutes against Kawempe Muslim Ladies in 2026).
- Youngest goalscorer: (Tanzania) Winfrida Gerald, aged 15 years, 8 months and 13 days (2023).
