= 2026 CAF Women's Champions League qualification =

2026 CAF Women's Champions League qualifying tournaments
Tournament details
- Host countries: (Tunisia) (UNAF) (The Gambia) (WAFU A) (Burkina Faso) (WAFU B) (Cameroon) (UNIFFAC) (Rwanda) (CECAFA) (Botswana) (COSAFA)
- Dates: 20 August – 7 September: UNAF: 1–7 September; WAFU A: 25 August – 6 September; WAFU B: 23 August – 5 September; UNIFFAC: 29 August – 4 September; CECAFA: 21–31 August; COSAFA: 20–29 August
- Teams: 39 (from 39 associations)

Tournament statistics
- Matches played: 66
- Goals scored: 253 (3.83 per match)
- Top scorers: (Kenya) Jentrix Shikangwa (4 goals- North Zone); (The Gambia) Sarah Jarju (4 goals - West A Zone); (Nigeria) Doosuur Atume (5 goals - West B Zone); (Cameroon) Brenda Tabe (4 goals - Central Zone); (Ethiopia) Emush Daniel (6 goals - Central-East Zone); (Botswana) Refilwe Tholakele (7 goals - South Zone)
- All statistics correct as of 10 September 2026.

The 2026 CAF Women's Champions League qualifying tournaments were held between 25 July and 9 September 2026.

Qualification consisted of six separate regional tournaments to select six teams for the main Champions League tournament, which also includes the tournament's defending champions (AS FAR), and the host nation's league-winning team.

== Teams ==
All participating teams qualified for the qualification phase by winning their respective national league titles and had their club licensing applications accepted by CAF. A total of 39 (out of 54) countries participated.

Key to colours
Winners of the regional tournament advanced to the finals

UNAF
Team	App
(Algeria) CF Akbou	2nd
(Egypt) FC Masar	3rd
(Morocco) FUS Rabat (Note: FUS Rabat took part in the UNAF qualifier as runners-up of the 2025–26 Moroccan Women's Championship D1 since the winner, AS FAR, automatically qualified to the final tournament as reigning champions.)	1st
(Tunisia) ASF Sousse	4th

WAFU A
Team	App
(The Gambia) Berewuleng FC	2nd
(Guinea) AS Bolonta	1st
(Liberia) Determine Girls FC	6th
(Mali) USFAS	2nd
(Senegal) Aigles de la Médina	3rd
(Sierra Leone) Mogbwemo Queens	3rd

WAFU B
Team	App
(Benin) Dynamique FC	1st
(Burkina Faso) USFA	5th
(Ghana) Ampem Darkoa	3rd
(Ivory Coast) ASEC Mimosas	2nd
(Niger) AS GNN	3rd
(Nigeria) Edo Queens	2nd
(Togo) ASKO Kara	3rd

UNIFFAC
Team	App
(Cameroon) Lekié FF	2nd
(Republic of the Congo) AC Colombe	2nd
(Democratic Republic of the Congo) FA Msichana	2nd
(Equatorial Guinea) FC 15 de Agosto	2nd

CECAFA
Team	App
(Burundi) Top Girls Academy	2nd
(Djibouti) FC UJECO	1st
(Eritrea) Denden FC	2nd
(Ethiopia) CBE FC	6th
Kenya Police Bullets	3rd
(Rwanda) Rayon Sports FC	3rd
(South Sudan) Yei Joint Stars FC	5th
(Tanzania) Simba Queens	4th
(Uganda) Kawempe Muslim	2nd
(Zanzibar) Mafunzo FC	1st

COSAFA
Team	App
(Botswana) Gaborone United	3rd
(Eswatini) Nsingizini Hotspurs	1st
(Lesotho) LDF FC	3rd
(Malawi) Silver Strikers Ladies	1st
(Mozambique) CD Costa do Sol	4th
(South Africa) Mamelodi Sundowns	5th
(Zambia) ZESCO Ndola Girls	2nd
(Zimbabwe) Herentals Queens	3rd

Associations which did not enter a team:

- Angola
- Cape Verde
- Central African Republic
- Chad
- Comoros
- Gabon
- Guinea-Bissau
- Libya
- Madagascar
- Mauritania
- Mauritius
- Namibia
- São Tomé and Príncipe
- Seychelles
- Somalia
- Sudan

== Schedule ==
The schedule of the competition was as follows:

Zone	Host city	Dates
UNAF	(Tunisia) Tunis	1–7 September
WAFU A	(The Gambia) Banjul	25 August – 6 September
WAFU B	(Burkina Faso) Ouagadougou	23 August – 5 September
UNIFFAC	(Cameroon) Yaoundé	29 August – 4 September
CECAFA	(Rwanda) Kigali	21–31 August
COSAFA	(Botswana) Gaborone	20–29 August

== Qualifying tournaments ==
=== UNAF ===
The UNAF qualifying tournament was held in Tunis, Tunisia, from 1 to 7 September 2026.

Pos	Team	Pld	W	D	L	GF	GA	GD	Pts	Qualification	FUS	FCM	CFA	ASF
1	(Morocco) FUS Rabat (C, Q)	3	3	0	0	14	1	+13	9	Main tournament			4–0	7–0
2	(Egypt) FC Masar	3	2	0	1	15	3	+12	6		1–3			
3	(Algeria) CF Akbou	3	1	0	2	3	9	−6	3			0–5		
4	(Tunisia) ASF Sousse (H)	3	0	0	3	0	19	−19	0			0–9	0–3	

Source: UNAF
(C) Champions; (H) Hosts; (Q) Qualified for the phase indicated

=== WAFU Zone A ===
The WAFU Zone A qualifying tournament was held in Gambia from 25 August to 6 September 2026.

==== Group stage ====
===== Group A =====
Pos	Team	Pld	W	D	L	GF	GA	GD	Pts	Qualification	USF	AME	DEG
1	(Mali) USFAS Bamako	2	2	0	0	5	1	+4	6	Semi-finals		1–0	
2	(Senegal) Aigles de la Médina	2	1	0	1	1	1	0	3	Semi-finals			1–0
3	(Liberia) Determine Girls	2	0	0	2	1	5	−4	0		1–4		

Source: WAFU Zone A

===== Group B =====
Pos	Team	Pld	W	D	L	GF	GA	GD	Pts	Qualification	ASB	BER	MOG
1	(Guinea) AS Bolonta	2	2	0	0	5	0	+5	6	Semi-finals			3–0
2	(The Gambia) Berewuleng FC (H)	2	1	0	1	5	3	+2	3	Semi-finals	0–2		
3	(Sierra Leone) Mogbwemo Queens	2	0	0	2	1	8	−7	0			1–5	

Source: WAFU Zone A
(H) Hosts

==== Knockout stage ====
===== Semi-finals =====
Team 1	Score	Team 2
USFAS Bamako (Mali)	3–2	(The Gambia) Berewuleng FC
AS Bolonta (Guinea)	0–1	(Senegal) Aigles de la Médina

===== Final =====
Team 1	Score	Team 2
USFAS Bamako (Mali)	1–0	(Senegal) Aigles de la Médina

=== WAFU Zone B ===
The WAFU Zone B qualifying tournament was held in Ouagadougou, Burkina Faso from 23 August to 5 September 2026.

==== Group stage ====
===== Group A =====
Pos	Team	Pld	W	D	L	GF	GA	GD	Pts	Qualification	USF	DYN	ASK
1	(Burkina Faso) USFA (H)	2	2	0	0	8	0	+8	6	Semi-finals		3–0	
2	(Benin) Dynamique	2	0	1	1	0	3	−3	1	Semi-finals			0–0
3	(Togo) ASKO	2	0	1	1	0	5	−5	1		0–5		

Source: CAF Zone Ouest B
(H) Hosts

===== Group B =====
Pos	Team	Pld	W	D	L	GF	GA	GD	Pts	Qualification	ADL	EDQ	ASE	GNN
1	(Ghana) Ampem Darkoa Ladies	3	3	0	0	7	1	+6	9	Semi-finals		2–1		4–0
2	(Nigeria) Edo Queens	3	2	0	1	11	3	+8	6	Semi-finals			3–1	7–0
3	(Ivory Coast) ASEC Mimosas	3	1	0	2	6	4	+2	3		0–1			
4	(Niger) AS GNN	3	0	0	3	0	16	−16	0				0–5	

Source: CAF Zone Ouest B

==== Knockout stage ====
===== Semi-finals =====
Team 1	Score	Team 2
USFA (Burkina Faso)	1–5	(Nigeria) Edo Queens
Ampem Darkoa Ladies (Ghana)	4–1	(Benin) Dynamique FC

===== 3rd place =====
Team 1	Score	Team 2
USFA (Burkina Faso)	4–1	(Benin) Dynamique FC

===== Final =====
Team 1	Score	Team 2
Edo Queens (Nigeria)	2–3 (a.e.t.)	(Ghana) Ampem Darkoa Ladies

=== UNIFFAC ===
Pos	Team	Pld	W	D	L	GF	GA	GD	Pts	Qualification	LEK	AGO	MSI	COL
1	(Cameroon) Lekié FF (H)	3	1	2	0	8	1	+7	5	Final tournament		1–1	0–0	
2	(Equatorial Guinea) 15 de Agosto Femenino	3	1	2	0	7	2	+5	5					6–1
3	(Democratic Republic of the Congo) FA Msichana	3	1	2	0	3	2	+1	5			0–0		
4	(Republic of the Congo) AC Colombe	3	0	0	3	3	16	−13	0		0–7		2–3	

Source: UNIFFAC
(H) Hosts

=== CECAFA ===
==== Group stage ====
===== Group A =====
Pos	Team	Pld	W	D	L	GF	GA	GD	Pts	Qualification	YEI	RAY	MAF	DEN
1	(South Sudan) Yei Joint Stars	3	2	1	0	5	1	+4	7	Semi-finals				3–0
2	(Rwanda) Rayon Sports (H)	3	1	2	0	4	1	+3	5		1–1		0–0	
3	(Zanzibar) Mafunzo	3	1	1	1	9	1	+8	4		0–1			9–0
4	(Eritrea) Denden	3	0	0	3	0	15	−15	0			0–3		

Source: CECAFA
(H) Hosts

===== Group B =====
Pos	Team	Pld	W	D	L	GF	GA	GD	Pts	Qualification	KAW	CBE	UJE
1	(Uganda) Kawempe Muslim Ladies	2	2	0	0	9	0	+9	6	Semi-finals		1–0	
2	(Ethiopia) CBE	2	1	0	1	11	1	+10	3	Semi-finals			11–0
3	(Djibouti) UJECO	2	0	0	2	0	19	−19	0		0–8		

Source: CECAFA

===== Group C =====
Pos	Team	Pld	W	D	L	GF	GA	GD	Pts	Qualification	KPB	SIM	TGA
1	Kenya Police Bullets	2	2	0	0	5	2	+3	6	Semi-finals		2–1	
2	(Tanzania) Simba Queens	2	1	0	1	3	2	+1	3				2–0
3	(Burundi) Top Girls Academy	2	0	0	2	1	5	−4	0		1–3		

Source: CECAFA

==== Knockout stage ====
===== Semi-finals =====
Team 1	Score	Team 2
Yei Joint Stars (South Sudan)	0–5	Kenya Police Bullets
Kawempe Muslim Ladies (Uganda)	3–0	(Ethiopia) CBE

===== 3rd place =====
Team 1	Score	Team 2
Yei Joint Stars (South Sudan)	1–6	(Ethiopia) CBE

===== Final =====
Team 1	Score	Team 2
Kenya Police Bullets	0–1 (a.e.t.)	(Uganda) Kawempe Muslim Ladies

=== COSAFA ===
==== Group stage ====
===== Group A =====
Pos	Team	Pld	W	D	L	GF	GA	GD	Pts	Qualification	ZNG	GBU	HEQ	LDF
1	(Zambia) ZESCO Ndola Girls	3	3	0	0	8	2	+6	9	Semi-finals			5–2	
2	(Botswana) Gaborone United (H)	3	2	0	1	3	3	0	6	Semi-finals	0–2		1–0	2–1
3	(Zimbabwe) Herentals Queens	3	1	0	2	3	6	−3	3					1–0
4	Lesotho Defence Force Ladies	3	0	0	3	1	4	−3	0		0–1			

Source: COSAFA
(H) Hosts

===== Group B =====
Pos	Team	Pld	W	D	L	GF	GA	GD	Pts	Qualification	MLS	SSL	CDS	NSI
1	(South Africa) Mamelodi Sundowns	3	3	0	0	15	1	+14	9	Semi-finals		3–0	4–1	8–0
2	(Malawi) Silver Strikers Ladies	3	2	0	1	7	5	+2	6	Semi-finals				5–1
3	(Mozambique) Costa do Sol	3	1	0	2	5	7	−2	3			1–2		
4	(Eswatini) Nsingizini Hotspurs	3	0	0	3	2	16	−14	0				1–3	

Source: COSAFA

==== Knockout stage ====
===== Semi-finals =====
Team 1	Score	Team 2
ZESCO Ndola Girls (Zambia)	2–1	(Malawi) Silver Strikers
Mamelodi Sundowns (South Africa)	5–0	(Botswana) Gaborone United

===== 3rd place =====
Team 1	Score	Team 2
Silver Strikers (Malawi)	0–4	(Botswana) Gaborone United

===== Final =====
Team 1	Score	Team 2
ZESCO Ndola Girls (Zambia)	1–2	(South Africa) Mamelodi Sundowns
