= CAF Women's Champions League CECAFA Qualifiers =

Top African football / soccer tournament

CECAFA Women's Champions League
- Organiser(s): CECAFA
- Founded: 2021; 5 years ago
- Region: CECAFA
- Teams: 9
- Qualifier for: CAF Women's Champions League
- Current champions: (Uganda) Kawempe Muslim Ladies
- Most championships: (Tanzania) JKT Queens (2 title)
- Website: https://cecafaonline.com/about-us/
- 2026 CECAFA Women's Champions League

The CAF Women's Champions League CECAFA Qualifiers, sometimes called the CECAFA Women's Champions League is an annual international women's association football club competition. The tournament is organised by the Council for East and Central Africa Football Associations, and will involve the top women's club teams of association members nations. It is the female counterpart of the CAF Champions League.

== History ==
In 2020, CAF announced the launch of the CAF Women's Champions League with each of the six sub confederations to hold qualifiers with the winners to represent them at the main tournament.

== Results ==
Season	Champion	Runner up	Ref.
2021	(Kenya) Vihiga Queens	(Ethiopia) CBE F.C.	
2022	(Tanzania) Simba Queens	(Uganda) She Corporate FC	
2023	(Tanzania) JKT Queens	(Ethiopia) CBE F.C.	
2024	(Ethiopia) CBE F.C.	Kenya Police Bullets	
2025	(Tanzania) JKT Queens	(Rwanda) Rayon Sports FC	
2026	(Uganda) Kawempe Muslim Ladies	Kenya Police Bullets	

== Records and statistics ==
Tournament	Best Player	Player	Goals	Golden Glove	Fair play	Ref.
2021	(Kenya) Jentrix Shikangwa	(Ethiopia) Loza Abera	13	(Uganda) Daisy Nakaziro		
2022	(Kenya) Vivian Corazon Aquino	(Ethiopia) Loza Abera	11	(Tanzania) Gelwa Lugomba	(Rwanda) AS Kigali Women	
2023	(Tanzania) Stumai Athumani	(Uganda) Fazila Ikwaput	8	(Tanzania) Najiat Idrisa	(Uganda) Kampala Queens FC	
2024	(Ethiopia) Mesay Temesgen	(Ethiopia) Senaf Wakuma	6	(Kenya) Annedy Kundu	(Tanzania) Simba Queens	
2025	(Tanzania) Donisia Minja	(Tanzania) Jamila Rajab	5	(Tanzania) Najiat Idrisa	(Tanzania) JKT Queens	
2026	(Uganda) Agnes Nabukenya	(Ethiopia) Emush Daniel Dandamo	6	(Uganda) Saidah Namwanje	(South Sudan) Yei Joint Stars	

=== Performance by nation ===
Nation	Winners	Runners-up	3rd Places	4th places	Winner	Runners-up	3rd Place	4th place
Tanzania	3	0	0	2	JKT Queens (2); Simba Queens (1)			Simba Queens (2)
Ethiopia	1	2	2		CBE F.C. (1)	CBE F.C. (2)	CBE F.C. (2)	
Kenya	1	2	1	1	Vihiga Queens (1)	Kenya Police Bullets (2)	Kenya Police Bullets (1)	Vihiga Queens (1)
Uganda	1	1	2	1	Kawempe Muslim (1)	She Corporate F.C. (1)	Lady Doves W.F.C (1); Kawempe Muslim (1)	Kampala Queens (1)
Rwanda	0	1	0	1		Rayon Sports (1)		AS Kigali (1)
Burundi	0	0	1	0			Buja Queens (1)	
South Sudan	0	0	0	1				Yei Joint Stars (1)
