= 2025 CAF Women's Champions League qualification =

2025 CAF Women's Champions League qualifying tournaments
Tournament details
- Host countries: Tunisia (UNAF); Senegal (WAFU A); Ivory Coast (WAFU B); Eq. Guinea (UNIFFAC); Kenya (CECAFA); South Africa (COSAFA)
- Dates: 5 August – September 19: UNAF: 31 August – 9 September; WAFU A: 5–17 August; WAFU B: 23 August – 4 September; UNIFFAC: 17–29 September; CECAFA: 3–19 September; COSAFA: 22–31 August
- Teams: 40 (from 40 associations)

Tournament statistics
- Matches played: 65
- Goals scored: 215 (3.31 per match)
- Top scorer: (Equatorial Guinea) Ana María Nchama (8 goals)
- All statistics correct as of 30 September 2025.

The 2025 CAF Women's Champions League qualifying tournaments will begin on 5 August and will end in September 2025.

Qualification will consist of 6 sub-confederation qualifying tournaments, which will commence on August 1, 2024. Qualification will finish in September, with the participating teams reduced to the final 8, consisting of one winning team each from the 6 CAF sub-confederations, the tournament's defending champions, and the host nation's league-winning team. These 8 teams would proceed to the main tournament phases, which had not been chosen yet.

== Teams ==
All participating teams qualified for the qualification phase by winning their respective national league titles and had their club licensing applications accepted by CAF. A total of 40 (out of 54) countries have a participant club in this edition

Key to colours
Winners of the regional tournament advance to the finals

UNAF
Team	App
(Algeria) Afak Relizane (Note: Initially qualified as champions of the 2024–25 Algerian Women's Championship, CF Akbou withdrew from the tournament on 1 July 2025, citing financial difficulties, limited staff, and a lack of squad depth to compete at continental level. Consequently, by mid-July, the Algerian Football Federation designated the league runners-up Afak Relizane to represent the country.)	4th
(Egypt) FC Masar	2nd
(Morocco) AS FAR	3rd (Note: AS FAR's appearances only account for participation in the qualifying stage. The club has entered every edition of the competition, but qualified automatically on two occasions (once as hosts and once as reigning champions).)
(Tunisia) ASF Sousse	3rd

WAFU A
Team	App
(The Gambia) Berewuleng FC	1st
(Liberia) Determine Girls FC	5th
(Mali) USFAS	1st
(Senegal) Aigles de la Médina	2nd
(Sierra Leone) Ram Kamara FC	1st

WAFU B
Team	App
(Benin) Sam Nelly FC	2nd
(Burkina Faso) USFA	4th
(Ghana) Police Ladies FC	1st
(Ivory Coast) ASEC Mimosas	1st
(Niger) AS GNN	2nd
(Nigeria) Bayelsa Queens FC	2nd
(Togo) ASKO Kara	2nd

UNIFFAC
Team	App
(Cameroon) FC Ebolowa	1st
(Republic of the Congo) AC Colombe	1st (Note: This team previously registered to compete in this tournament but has not yet played an international match.)
(Democratic Republic of the Congo) FA Msichana	1st
(Equatorial Guinea) FC 15 de Agosto	1st
(Chad) Elect-Sport FC	1st

CECAFA
Team	App
(Burundi) Top Girls Academy	1st
(Eritrea) Denden SC	1st
(Ethiopia) CBE FC	5th
Kenya Police Bullets	2nd
(Rwanda) Rayon Sports FC	2nd
(South Sudan) Yei Joint Stars FC	5th
(Tanzania) JKT Queens	2nd
(Uganda) Kampala Queens FC	2nd
(Zanzibar) JKU Princess FC	1st

COSAFA
Team	App
(Botswana) Gaborone United	2nd
(Comoros) Olympic de Moroni	3rd
(Eswatini) Young Buffaloes	4th
(Lesotho) Kick4Life WFC	1st
(Malawi) Ntopwa FC	2nd
(Mozambique) CD Costa do Sol	3rd
(Namibia) Beauties FC	1st
(South Africa) Mamelodi Sundowns	3rd
(Zambia) ZESCO Ndola Girls	1st
(Zimbabwe) Herentals Queens	2nd

Associations which did not enter a team:

- Angola
- Cape Verde
- Central African Republic
- Djibouti
- Gabon
- Guinea
- Guinea-Bissau
- Libya
- Madagascar
- Mauritania
- Mauritius
- São Tomé and Príncipe
- Seychelles
- Somalia
- Sudan

== Schedule ==
The schedule of the competition was as follows

Schedule for 2025 CAF Women's Champions League qualification
Zone	Date
UNAF	31 August – 9 September
WAFU A	5–17 August
WAFU B	23 August – 4 September
UNIFFAC	17–29 September
CECAFA	3–19 September
COSAFA	22–31 August

== Qualifying tournaments ==
=== UNAF ===
The UNAF qualifying tournament will be held in Tunisia, across the cities of Sousse and Monastir, from 31 August to 9 September 2025.

Pos	Team	Pld	W	D	L	GF	GA	GD	Pts	Qualification	FAR	MAS	AFA	ASF
1	(Morocco) AS FAR	3	3	0	0	11	1	+10	9	Main tournament	—	1–3	4–0	
2	(Egypt) FC Masar	3	2	0	1	11	4	+7	6			—		6–0
3	(Algeria) Afak Relizane	3	1	0	2	2	8	−6	3			1–4	—	
4	(Tunisia) ASF Sousse (H)	3	0	0	3	0	11	−11	0		0–4		0–1	—

Source: UNAF
(H) Hosts

=== WAFU Zone A ===
The WAFU Zone A qualifying tournament was held in Dakar, Senegal from 5 to 17 August 2025.

Pos	Team	Pld	W	D	L	GF	GA	GD	Pts	Qualification
1	(Mali) USFAS Bamako	4	3	0	1	7	1	+6	9	Main tournament
2	(Senegal) Aigles de la Médina (H)	4	3	0	1	8	3	+5	9	
3	(The Gambia) Berewuleng FC	4	2	0	2	6	5	+1	6	
4	(Sierra Leone) Ram Kamara	4	1	1	2	1	6	−5	4	
5	(Liberia) Determine Girls	4	0	1	3	1	8	−7	1	

Source: CAF
(H) Hosts

=== WAFU Zone B ===
The WAFU Zone B qualifying tournament will be held in Yamoussoukro, Ivory Coast from 23 August to 4 September 2025.

==== Group stage ====
===== Group A =====
Pos	Team	Pld	W	D	L	GF	GA	GD	Pts	Qualification
1	(Ivory Coast) ASEC Mimosas (H)	2	2	0	0	5	1	+4	6	Semi-finals
2	(Burkina Faso) USFA	2	1	0	1	1	3	−2	3	Semi-finals
3	(Niger) AS GNN	2	0	0	2	1	3	−2	0	

Source: WAFU B
(H) Hosts

===== Group B =====
Pos	Team	Pld	W	D	L	GF	GA	GD	Pts	Qualification
1	(Nigeria) Bayelsa Queens	3	3	0	0	9	2	+7	9	Semi-finals
2	(Ghana) Police Ladies	3	2	0	1	7	4	+3	6	Semi-finals
3	(Benin) Sam Nelly	3	1	0	2	3	7	−4	3	
4	(Togo) ASKO Kara	3	0	0	3	1	7	−6	0	

Source: WAFU B

==== Knockout stage ====
===== Semi-finals =====
Team 1	Score	Team 2
ASEC Mimosas (Ivory Coast)	4–1	(Ghana) Police Ladies
Bayelsa Queens (Nigeria)	2–1	(Burkina Faso) USFA

===== 3rd place =====
Team 1	Score	Team 2
Police Ladies (Ghana)	0–0 (4–5 p)	(Burkina Faso) USFA

===== Final =====
Team 1	Score	Team 2
ASEC Mimosas (Ivory Coast)	1–1 (8–7 p)	(Nigeria) Bayelsa Queens

=== UNIFFAC ===
Pos	Team	Pld	W	D	L	GF	GA	GD	Pts	Qualification
1	(Equatorial Guinea) 15 de Agosto (H)	4	3	1	0	18	3	+15	10	Main tournament
2	(Cameroon) FC Ebolowa	4	3	0	1	9	4	+5	9	
3	(Democratic Republic of the Congo) FA Msichana	4	2	1	1	15	6	+9	7	
4	(Republic of the Congo) AC Colombe	4	1	0	3	8	11	−3	3	
5	(Chad) TP Elect-Sport	4	0	0	4	1	27	−26	0	

Source: UNIFFAC
(H) Hosts

=== CECAFA ===
The CECAFA qualifying tournament will be held in Nairobi, Kenya from 4 to 16 September 2025.

==== Group stage ====
===== Group A =====
Pos	Team	Pld	W	D	L	GF	GA	GD	Pts	Qualification
1	Kenya Police Bullets	2	2	0	0	3	0	+3	6	Semi-finals
2	(Uganda) Kampala Queens	2	1	0	1	7	1	+6	3	Semi-finals
3	(Eritrea) Denden SC	2	0	0	2	0	9	−9	0	

Source: CECAFA

===== Group B =====
Pos	Team	Pld	W	D	L	GF	GA	GD	Pts	Qualification
1	(Rwanda) Rayon Sports	2	1	1	0	2	1	+1	4	Semi-finals
2	(Burundi) Top Girls Academy	2	0	2	0	0	0	0	2	
3	(Ethiopia) CBE	2	0	1	1	1	2	−1	1	

Source: CECAFA

===== Group C =====
Pos	Team	Pld	W	D	L	GF	GA	GD	Pts	Qualification	JKT	YEI	JKU
1	(Tanzania) JKT Queens	2	2	0	0	7	0	+7	6	Semi-finals	—	5–2	5–0
2	(South Sudan) Yei Joint Stars FC	2	1	0	1	4	4	0	3			—	4–2
3	(Zanzibar) JKU Princess	2	0	0	2	2	9	−7	0				—

Source: CECAFA

==== Knockout stage ====
===== Semi-finals =====
Team 1	Score	Team 2
Rayon Sports Women (Rwanda)	0–0 (4–3 p)	(Uganda) Kampala Queens
Kenya Police Bullets	1–1 (2–4 p)	(Tanzania) JKT Queens

===== 3rd place =====
Team 1	Score	Team 2
Kampala Queens (Uganda)	0–1	Kenya Police Bullets

===== Final =====
Team 1	Score	Team 2
Rayon Sports Women (Rwanda)	0–1	(Tanzania) JKT Queens

=== COSAFA ===
The COSAFA qualifying tournament will be held in Johannesburg, South Africa from 22 to 31 August 2025.

==== Group A ====
Pos	Team	Pld	W	D	L	GF	GA	GD	Pts	Qualification
1	(South Africa) Mamelodi Sundowns (H)	3	3	0	0	11	0	+11	9	Semi-finals
2	(Zambia) ZESCO Ndola Girls	3	2	0	1	8	4	+4	6	Semi-finals
3	(Namibia) Beauties FC	3	1	0	2	3	10	−7	3	
4	(Malawi) Ntopwa FC	3	0	0	3	3	11	−8	0	

Source: COSAFA
(H) Hosts

==== Group B ====
Pos	Team	Pld	W	D	L	GF	GA	GD	Pts	Qualification
1	(Botswana) Gaborone United Ladies	2	2	0	0	11	1	+10	6	Semi-finals
2	(Eswatini) Young Buffaloes	2	1	0	1	3	2	+1	3	
3	(Lesotho) Kick4Life	2	0	0	2	2	13	−11	0	

Source: COSAFA

==== Group C ====
Pos	Team	Pld	W	D	L	GF	GA	GD	Pts	Qualification
1	(Mozambique) CD Costa do Sol	2	1	1	0	4	2	+2	4	Semi-finals
2	(Zimbabwe) Herentals Queens	2	1	0	1	4	4	0	3	
3	(Comoros) Olympic de Moroni	2	0	1	1	4	6	−2	1	

Source: COSAFA

==== Knockout stage ====
===== Semi-finals =====
Team 1	Score	Team 2
Gaborone United (Botswana)	3–1	(Mozambique) CD Costa do Sol
Mamelodi Sundowns (South Africa)	1–2	(Zambia) ZESCO Ndola Girls

===== Final =====
Team 1	Score	Team 2
Gaborone United (Botswana)	1–1 (4–3 p)	(Zambia) ZESCO Ndola Girls
