= 2025 CAF Women's Champions League CECAFA Qualifiers =

Tournament details
- Host country: Kenya
- City: Nairobi
- Dates: 4 -16 September 2025
- Teams: 9 (from 9 associations)
- Venues: 2 (in 1 host city)

Final positions
- Champions: (Tanzania) JKT Queens (2nd title)
- Runners-up: (Rwanda) Rayon Sports Women
- Third place: Kenya Police Bullets
- Fourth place: (Uganda) Kampala Queen

Tournament statistics
- Matches played: 13
- Goals scored: 30 (2.31 per match)
- Top scorer: (Tanzania) Jamila Rajab (5 goals)
- Best player: (Tanzania) Donisia Daniel Minja
- Best goalkeeper: (Tanzania) Idrissa Najiati
- Fair play award: (Tanzania) JKT Queens
- All statistics correct as of 16 September 2025.

The 2025 CAF Women's Champions League CECAFA Qualifiers is the 5th edition of CAF Women's Champions League CECAFA Qualifiers tournament organized by the CECAFA for the women's clubs of association nations. This edition will be held in Nairobi, Kenya from 4 to 16 September 2025.

The winners of the tournament qualify for the 2025 CAF Women's Champions League final tournament.

== Participating clubs ==
The following nine teams contested in the qualifying tournament.

| Team | Appearances | Previous best performance |
|---|---|---|
| (Ethiopia) CBE | 5th | Champion (2024) |
| (Eritrea) Denden SC | 1st | n/a |
| (Burundi) Top Girls Academy | 1st | n/a |
| Kenya Police Bullets | 2nd | Runner-up (2024) |
| (Rwanda) Rayon Sports FC | 2nd | Group stage (2024) |
| (South Sudan) Yei Joint Stars | 5th | Group stage (2021, 2022, 2023, 2024) |
| (Tanzania) JKT Queens | 2nd | Champion (2023) |
| (Uganda) Kampala Queen | 2nd | Group stage (2023) |
| (Zanzibar) JKU Princess | 1st | n/a |

== Venues ==
| 2025 CAF Women's Champions League CECAFA Qualifiers is located in Kenya | Nairobi | |
|---|---|---|
| 2025 CAF Women's Champions League CECAFA Qualifiers is located in Kenya | Nyayo National Stadium | Ulinzi Sports Complex |
| 2025 CAF Women's Champions League CECAFA Qualifiers is located in Kenya | Capacity: 30,000 | Capacity: 10,000 |

== Match officials ==
=== Referees ===
- Suad Mohamed (Djibouti)
- Lillian Nakitto (Uganda)
- Leticia Ndagire (Rwanda)
- Asha Said (Tanzania)
- Ruth Aturo (Uganda)
- Fatuma Hassan (Ethiopia)

=== Assistant Referees ===
- Halima Adan (Somalia)
- Jackline Nduku (Kenya)
- Amina Mohamed (Eritrea)
- Neema Mushi (Tanzania)
- Grace Nanyondo (Uganda)
- Rahma Osman (Sudan)

== Draw ==
The draw for this edition of the tournament was held on 26 August 2025 at 13:00 UTC+3 (13:00 EAT) in Nairobi, Kenya. The nine participating teams were drawn into three groups of three. Only the group winners will advance to the semi-finals, where they will compete for the single CECAFA slot at the continental finals.

Group A
Kenya Police Bullets
(Eritrea) FC Denden
(Uganda) Kampala Queens

Group B
(Ethiopia) CBE
(Burundi) Top Girls Academy
(Rwanda) Rayon Sports

Group C
(Tanzania) JKT Queens
(South Sudan) Yei Joint Stars
(Zanzibar) JKU Princesses

== Group stage ==
Tiebreakers

Teams are ranked according to points (3 points for a win, 1 point for a draw, 0 points for a loss), and if tied on points, the following tiebreaking criteria are applied, in the order given, to determine the rankings.

1. Points in head-to-head matches among tied teams;
2. Goal difference in head-to-head matches among tied teams;
3. Goals scored in head-to-head matches among tied teams;
4. If more than two teams are tied, and after applying all head-to-head criteria above, a subset of teams are still tied, all head-to-head criteria above are reapplied exclusively to this subset of teams;
5. Goal difference in all group matches;
6. Goals scored in all group matches;
7. Penalty shoot-out if only two teams are tied and they met in the last round of the group;
8. Disciplinary points (yellow card = 1 point, red card as a result of two yellow cards = 3 points, direct red card = 3 points, yellow card followed by direct red card = 4 points);
9. Drawing of lots.

=== Group A ===
| Pos | Team | Pld | W | D | L | GF | GA | GD | Pts | Qualification |
|---|---|---|---|---|---|---|---|---|---|---|
| 1 | Kenya Police Bullets | 2 | 2 | 0 | 0 | 3 | 0 | +3 | 6 | Semi-finals |
| 2 | (Uganda) Kampala Queens | 2 | 1 | 0 | 1 | 7 | 1 | +6 | 3 | Semi-finals |
| 3 | (Eritrea) Denden SC | 2 | 0 | 0 | 2 | 0 | 9 | −9 | 0 | |

Source: CECAFA
4 September 2025
16:00

| Kenya Police Bullets | 1–0 | (Uganda) Kampala Queens |
|---|---|---|
| Kemunto 46' | Report |

Nyayo National Stadium, Nairobi

7 September 2025
15:00

| Denden SC (Eritrea) | 0–7 | (Uganda) Kampala Queens |
|---|---|---|
| | Report | Naigaga 4', 55'; Lema 8', 47'; Muduwa 30', 46'; Namaganda 77' |

Nyayo National Stadium, Nairobi

10 September 2025
15:00

| Kenya Police Bullets | 2–0 | (Eritrea) Denden SC |
|---|---|---|
| Kemunto 7'; Namuleme 34' | Report |

Nyayo National Stadium, Nairobi

=== Group B ===
| Pos | Team | Pld | W | D | L | GF | GA | GD | Pts | Qualification |
|---|---|---|---|---|---|---|---|---|---|---|
| 1 | (Rwanda) Rayon Sports | 2 | 1 | 1 | 0 | 2 | 1 | +1 | 4 | Semi-finals |
| 2 | (Burundi) Top Girls Academy | 2 | 0 | 2 | 0 | 0 | 0 | 0 | 2 | |
| 3 | (Ethiopia) CBE | 2 | 0 | 1 | 1 | 1 | 2 | −1 | 1 | |

Source: CECAFA
4 September 2025
13:00

| CBE (Ethiopia) | 1–2 | (Rwanda) Rayon Sports |
|---|---|---|
| Matios 72' | Report | Gikundiro 4'; Ngwema 55' |

Nyayo National Stadium, Nairobi

8 September 2025
15:00

| Top Girls Academy FC (Burundi) | 0-0 | (Rwanda) Rayon Sports Women |
|---|---|---|
| | Report |

Ulinzi Complex, Nairobi

11 September 2025
15:00

| CBE (Ethiopia) | 0-0 | (Burundi) Top Girls Academy FC |

Ulinzi Complex, Nairobi

=== Group C ===
| Pos | Team | Pld | W | D | L | GF | GA | GD | Pts | Qualification | JKT | YEI | JKU |
|---|---|---|---|---|---|---|---|---|---|---|---|---|---|
| 1 | (Tanzania) JKT Queens | 2 | 2 | 0 | 0 | 7 | 0 | +7 | 6 | Semi-finals | — | 5–2 | 5–0 |
| 2 | (South Sudan) Yei Joint Stars FC | 2 | 1 | 0 | 1 | 4 | 4 | 0 | 3 | | | — | 4–2 |
| 3 | (Zanzibar) JKU Princess | 2 | 0 | 0 | 2 | 2 | 9 | −7 | 0 | | | | — |

Source: CECAFA
5 September 2025
13:00

| JKT Queens (Tanzania) | 5–0 | (Zanzibar) JKU Princess |
|---|---|---|
| Rajab 18', 36', 71'; Gerald 27'; Mlangwa 88' | Report |

Ulinzi Complex, Nairobi

8 September 2025
16:00

| Yei Joint Stars FC (South Sudan) | 4–2 | (Zanzibar) JKU Princess |
|---|---|---|
| Grace 34'; Immaculate 81'; Lasuba 83'; ??? 90+1' (.og) | Report | Mathias 1', 3' |

Ulinzi Complex, Nairobi

11 September 2025
16:00

| JKT Queens (Tanzania) | 2–0 | (South Sudan) Yei Joint Stars FC |
|---|---|---|
| Rajab 60'; Marwa 68' | Report |

Ulinzi Complex, Nairobi

=== Best runners-up ranking ===
| Pos | Grp | Team | Pld | W | D | L | GF | GA | GD | Pts | Qualification |
|---|---|---|---|---|---|---|---|---|---|---|---|
| 1 | A | (Uganda) Kampala Queens | 2 | 1 | 0 | 1 | 7 | 1 | +6 | 3 | semi-finals |
| 2 | C | (South Sudan) Yei Joint Stars FC | 2 | 1 | 0 | 1 | 4 | 4 | 0 | 3 | |
| 3 | B | (Burundi) Top Girls Academy FC | 2 | 0 | 2 | 0 | 0 | 0 | 0 | 2 | |

Source: CECAFA
Rules for classification: Tiebreakers

== Knockout stage ==
=== Bracket ===
Semifinals
September 14 – Nairobi
(Rwanda) Rayon Sports Women (p) | 0 (4)
(Uganda) Kampala Queens | 0 (3)
September 14 – Nairobi
Kenya Police Bullets | 1 (2)
(Tanzania) JKT Queens (p) | 1 (4)

Final
September 16 – Nairobi
(Rwanda) Rayon Sports Women | 0
(Tanzania) JKT Queens | 1
Third place
September 16 – Nairobi
(Uganda) Kampala Queens | 0
Kenya Police Bullets | 1

=== Semi-finals ===
14 September 2025
12:30

| Rayon Sports Women (Rwanda) | 0–0 (a.e.t.) | (Uganda) Kampala Queens |
|---|---|---|
| | Report |
Penalties
| | 4–3 |

Ulinzi Complex, Nairobi

14 September 2025
15:30

| Kenya Police Bullets | 1–1 (a.e.t.) | (Tanzania) JKT Queens |
|---|---|---|
| Kunhira 16' | Report | Rajab 38' |
Penalties
| | 2–4 |

Ulinzi Complex, Nairobi

=== Third Place Match ===
16 September 2025
12:00

| (Uganda) Kampala Queens | 0–1 | Kenya Police Bullets |
|---|---|---|
| | Report | Kunhira 26' |

Nyayo Stadium, Nairobi

=== Finals ===
16 September 2025
15:30

| Rayon Sports Women (Rwanda) | 0–1 | (Tanzania) JKT Queens |
|---|---|---|
| | Report | Gerald 5' |

Nyayo Stadium, Nairobi

== Awards and statistics ==
=== Goalscorers ===
There have been 30 goals scored in 13 matches, for an average of 2.31 goals per match (as of 16 September 2025).

| Rank | Player | Team | Goals |
|---|---|---|---|
| 1 | (Tanzania) Jamila Rajab | (Tanzania) JKT Queens | 5 |
| 2 | (Uganda) Kamiyati Naigaga | (Uganda) Kampala Queens | 2 |
| 2 | (Uganda) Tourist Lema Tone | (Uganda) Kampala Queens | 2 |
| 2 | (Uganda) Peace Muduwa | (Uganda) Kampala Queens | 2 |
| 2 | (Kenya) Emily Kemunto | Kenya Police Bullets | 2 |
| 2 | (Zanzibar) Winfrida Mathias | (Zanzibar) JKU Princess | 2 |
| 2 | (Tanzania) Winfrida Gerald | (Tanzania) JKT Queens | 2 |
| 2 | (Kenya) Margaret Kunhira | Kenya Police Bullets | 2 |
| 9 | (Kenya) Zaina Namuleme | Kenya Police Bullets | 1 |
| 9 | (Ethiopia) Rediet Assresahagn Matios | (Ethiopia) CBE | 1 |
| 9 | (Rwanda) Scholastique Gikundiro | (Rwanda) Rayon Sports | 1 |
| 9 | (Rwanda) Odette Coralie Ngwema | (Rwanda) Rayon Sports | 1 |
| 9 | (Tanzania) Asha Mlangwa | (Tanzania) JKT Queens | 1 |
| 9 | (Uganda) Zaituna Namaganda | (Uganda) Kampala Queens | 1 |
| 9 | (South Sudan) Aluka Grace | (South Sudan) Yei Joint Stars FC | 1 |
| 9 | (South Sudan) Ambayo Immaculate | (South Sudan) Yei Joint Stars FC | 1 |
| 9 | (South Sudan) Mariam Luis Lasuba | (South Sudan) Yei Joint Stars FC | 1 |
| 9 | (Tanzania) Ester Maseke Marwa | (Tanzania) JKT Queens | 1 |

==== own goal ====
| Rank | Player | Team | Goals |
|---|---|---|---|
| 1 | (Zanzibar) ???????? | (Zanzibar) JKU Princess | 1 |
