= 2026 CAF Women's Champions League =

6th CAF Women's Champions League edition

Tournament details
- Host country: Egypt
- City: Ismailia
- Dates: Qualification: 20 August – 7 September 2026; Main tournament: 1–15 November 2026
- Teams: Main tournament: 8 Total: 39
- Venues: 2

Final positions
- Champions: (Morocco) AS FAR (3rd title)
- Runners-up: (South Africa) Mamelodi Sundowns
- Third place: (Cameroon) Lekié FF
- Fourth place: (Uganda) Kawempe Muslim Ladies

Tournament statistics
- Matches played: 16
- Goals scored: 52 (3.25 per match)
- Top scorer(s): (Morocco) Imane Touriss (Uganda) Agnes Nabukenya (4 goals each)
- Best player: (Morocco) Ghizlane Chebbak
- Best goalkeeper: (Morocco) Khadija Er-Rmichi
- Fair play award: (South Africa) Mamelodi Sundowns
- All statistics correct as of 15 November 2026.

The 2026 CAF Women's Champions League was the sixth edition of the annual African premier women's association football club tournament organized by the Confederation of African Football (CAF). The tournament was hosted by Egypt from 1 to 15 November 2026, marking the third time the country hosted the competition after the 2021 and 2025 editions.

Defending champions AS FAR successfully retained their title by defeating Mamelodi Sundowns 3–1 in the final. The Moroccan club became the first team in the history of the competition to win three titles and the first to win back-to-back titles. AS FAR also extended their record of six consecutive podium finishes and became the joint record holder for most finals appearances (four), alongside Mamelodi Sundowns.

As African champions, AS FAR qualified for the 2027 FIFA Women's Champions Cup and the inaugural 2028 FIFA Women's Club World Cup.

== Qualified teams ==
Location of teams of the 2026 CAF Women's Champions League group stage.
Group A
Group B

The qualification tournaments were held between August and September 2026, covering all six regions.

Association	Team	Qualifying method	Appearance
Egypt	FC Masar (hosts)	2025–26 Egyptian Women's Premier League champions	3rd
Morocco	AS FAR (holders)	2025 CAF Women's Champions League winners	6th
Morocco	FUS Rabat	2026 CAF Women's Champions League UNAF Qualifiers champions	1st
Mali	USFAS Bamako	2026 CAF Women's Champions League WAFU Zone A Qualifiers champions	2nd
Ghana	Ampem Darkoa Ladies (Note: Edo Queens of Nigeria initially qualified after a 4–1 penalty shootout victory over Ampem Darkoa Ladies in the WAFU Zone B Qualifiers final after it ended 2–2 in regulation time. However, following a protest by the Ghanaian side regarding the officials' decision not to play extra time before the shootout, the extra time was subsequently played. Ampem Darkoa won the replay to qualify.)	2026 CAF Women's Champions League WAFU Zone B Qualifiers champions	2nd
Cameroon	Lekié FF	2026 CAF Women's Champions League UNIFFAC Qualifiers champions	1st
Uganda	Kawempe Muslim Ladies	2026 CAF Women's Champions League CECAFA Qualifiers champions	1st
South Africa	Mamelodi Sundowns	2026 CAF Women's Champions League COSAFA Qualifiers champions	5th

== Venues ==
2026 CAF Women's Champions League (Egypt)	Ismailia		
2026 CAF Women's Champions League (Egypt)	Ismailia	Ismailia Stadium	Suez Canal Stadium
2026 CAF Women's Champions League (Egypt)	Ismailia	Capacity: 30,000	Capacity: 22,000

== Group stage ==
=== Tiebreakers ===
Teams were ranked according to points (3 points for a win, 1 point for a draw, 0 points for a loss).

If two teams were tied on points, the following tiebreaking criteria were applied, in the order given, to determine the rankings (Regulations Article 71):

1. Points in head-to-head matches match between the two tied teams;
2. Goal difference in all group matches;
3. Goals scored in all group matches;
4. Drawing of lots.

If more than two teams were tied, the following criteria were applied instead:

1. Points in matches between the tied teams;
2. Goal difference in matches between the tied teams;
3. Goals scored in matches between the tied teams;
4. If after applying all criteria above, two teams were still tied, the above criteria were again applied to matches played between the two teams in question. If this did not resolve the tie, the next three criteria were applied;
5. Goal difference in all group matches;
6. Goals scored in all group matches;
7. Drawing of lots.

=== Group A ===
Pos	Team	Pld	W	D	L	GF	GA	GD	Pts	Qualification
1	(South Africa) Mamelodi Sundowns	3	2	1	0	5	1	+4	7	Advance to knockout stage
2	(Cameroon) Lekié FF	3	1	1	1	3	3	0	4 (Note: Head-to-head result: Lekié FF 2–1 FC Masar)	Advance to knockout stage
3	(Egypt) FC Masar (H)	3	1	1	1	4	2	+2	4	
4	(Morocco) FUS Rabat	3	0	1	2	0	6	−6	1	

Source: Flashscore
(H) Hosts
Notes:
1 November 2026
14:00

FUS Rabat (Morocco)	0–0	(Cameroon) Lekié FF
	Report

Suez Canal Stadium, Ismailia
Referee: Awa Ilboudo (Burkina Faso)
1 November 2026
17:00

FC Masar (Egypt)	0–0	(South Africa) Mamelodi Sundowns
	Report

Suez Canal Stadium, Ismailia
Referee: Aline Umutoni (Rwanda)

4 November 2026
14:00

Lekié FF (Cameroon)	1–2	(South Africa) Mamelodi Sundowns
Tim 84'	Report	Tholakele 42'; Makana 88' (o.g.)

Suez Canal Stadium, Ismailia
Referee: Aminata Fullah (Sierra Leone)
4 November 2026
17:00

FC Masar (Egypt)	3–0	(Morocco) FUS Rabat
Shikangwa 15', 79'; Ba 87'	Report

Suez Canal Stadium, Ismailia
Referee: Eunice Akintoye (Nigeria)

7 November 2026
14:00

Lekié FF (Cameroon)	2–1	(Egypt) FC Masar
Tabe 1'; Ngon 59'	Report	El-Mahdy 36'

Suez Canal Stadium, Ismailia
Referee: Aïssatou Kanté (Guinea)
7 November 2026
14:00

Mamelodi Sundowns (South Africa)	3–0	(Morocco) FUS Rabat
Mbane 25'; Majiya 86'; Dhlamini 90+2' (pen.)	Report

Ismailia Stadium, Ismailia
Referee: Yacine Samassa (Mauritania)

=== Group B ===
Pos	Team	Pld	W	D	L	GF	GA	GD	Pts	Qualification
1	(Morocco) AS FAR	3	2	0	1	10	3	+7	6 (Note: Tied on head-to-head points. Head-to-head goal difference was used as the tiebreaker; AS FAR +1, Kawempe 0, Ampem Darkoa −1.)	Advance to knockout stage
2	(Uganda) Kawempe Muslim Ladies	3	2	0	1	7	4	+3	6	Advance to knockout stage
3	(Ghana) Ampem Darkoa Ladies	3	2	0	1	7	4	+3	6	
4	(Mali) USFAS Bamako	3	0	0	3	1	14	−13	0	

Source: Flashscore
Notes:
2 November 2026
14:00

AS FAR (Morocco)	2–3	(Uganda) Kawempe Muslim Ladies
Tagnaout 6'; El Madani 69' (pen.)	Report	Nabukenya 52', 90+3'; Nyinagahirwa 58'

Suez Canal Stadium, Ismailia
Referee: Yacine Samassa (Mauritania)
2 November 2026
17:00

USFAS Bamako (Mali)	1–5	(Ghana) Ampem Darkoa Ladies
Koné 11'	Report	Ang. Yeboah 28', 79'; Agyei 31'; Nyarkoh 83'; Amoh 90+4'

Suez Canal Stadium, Ismailia
Referee: Zakia El Grini (Morocco)

5 November 2026
14:00

AS FAR (Morocco)	6–0	(Mali) USFAS Bamako
Benzina 6'; El Madani 8'; Touriss 24', 44'; Tagnaout 62'; Laftah 72'	Report

Suez Canal Stadium, Ismailia
Referee: Natacha Konan (Ivory Coast)
5 November 2026
17:00

Ampem Darkoa Ladies (Ghana)	2–1	(Uganda) Kawempe Muslim Ladies
Amoh 9'; Nyarkoh 84'	Report	Nabirye 33'

Suez Canal Stadium, Ismailia
Referee: Innocentia Njang (Cameroon)

8 November 2026
14:00

Ampem Darkoa Ladies (Ghana)	0–2	(Morocco) AS FAR
	Report	Chebbak 59' (pen.); Youssoufi 90+6'

Suez Canal Stadium, Ismailia
Referee: Aline Umutoni (Rwanda)
8 November 2026
14:00

Kawempe Muslim Ladies (Uganda)	3–0	(Mali) USFAS Bamako
Nabukenya 23', 71'; Nakagolo 40'	Report

Ismailia Stadium, Ismailia
Referee: Rachel Zihindula (DR Congo)

== Knockout phase ==
Semi-finals
11 November – Ismailia
(South Africa) Mamelodi Sundowns	4
(Uganda) Kawempe Muslim Ladies	1
11 November – Ismailia
(Morocco) AS FAR	1
(Cameroon) Lekié FF	0

Final
15 November – Ismailia
(South Africa) Mamelodi Sundowns	1
(Morocco) AS FAR	3
Third place
14 November – Ismailia
(Uganda) Kawempe Muslim Ladies	0
(Cameroon) Lekié FF	5

=== Semi-finals ===
11 November 2026
14:00

AS FAR (Morocco)	1–0	(Cameroon) Lekié FF
Chebbak 48'	Report

Ismailia Stadium, Ismailia
Referee: Natacha Konan (Ivory Coast)

11 November 2026
17:00

Mamelodi Sundowns (South Africa)	4–1	(Uganda) Kawempe Muslim Ladies
Donnelly 29', 35', 37'; Cesane 45'	Report	Nakasi 72'

Suez Canal Stadium, Ismailia
Referee: Eunice Akintoye (Nigeria)

=== Third-place match ===
14 November 2026
14:00

Kawempe Muslim Ladies (Uganda)	0–5	(Cameroon) Lekié FF
	Report	Nchout 2'; Nnanga 15', 80'; Tim 67'; Takounda 78'

Ismailia Stadium, Ismailia
Referee: Yacine Samassa (Mauritania)

=== Final ===
15 November 2026
17:00

AS FAR (Morocco)	3–1	(South Africa) Mamelodi Sundowns
Touriss 23', 77'; Youssoufi 37'	Report	Tholakele 25'

Suez Canal Stadium, Ismailia
Attendance: 500
Referee: Aline Umutoni (Rwanda)

== Statistics ==
=== Top scorers ===
Rank	Player	Team	Goals
1	(Morocco) Imane Touriss	(Morocco) AS FAR	4
1	(Uganda) Agnes Nabukenya	(Uganda) Kawempe Muslim Ladies	4
3	(South Africa) Ronnel Donnelly	(South Africa) Mamelodi Sundowns	3
4	(Morocco) Ghizlane Chebbak	(Morocco) AS FAR	2
4	(Morocco) Doha El Madani	(Morocco) AS FAR	2
4	(Morocco) Fatima Tagnaout	(Morocco) AS FAR	2
4	(Morocco) Hiba Youssoufi	(Morocco) AS FAR	2
4	(Ghana) Nancy Amoh	(Ghana) Ampem Darkoa Ladies	2
4	(Cameroon) Tim Shalom Makoma	(Cameroon) Lekié FF	2
4	(Cameroon) Raïssa Nnanga	(Cameroon) Lekié FF	2
4	(Ghana) Beline Nyarkoh	(Ghana) Ampem Darkoa Ladies	2
4	(Kenya) Jentrix Shikangwa	(Egypt) FC Masar	2
4	(Botswana) Refilwe Tholakele	(South Africa) Mamelodi Sundowns	2
4	(Ghana) Angelina Yeboah	(Ghana) Ampem Darkoa Ladies	2

== Awards ==
The CAF Women's Champions League Technical Study Group selected the following as the best of the tournament. AS FAR swept all three individual awards following their record third continental title and second consecutive triumph, while Mamelodi Sundowns received the Fair Play award.

Award	Player	Team
Best Player	(Morocco) Ghizlane Chebbak	(Morocco) AS FAR
Top Goal scorer	(Morocco) Imane Touriss	(Morocco) AS FAR
Best Goalkeeper	(Morocco) Khadija Er-Rmichi	(Morocco) AS FAR
Fair Play team	(South Africa) Mamelodi Sundowns	

The CAF Technical Study Group announced the Group Stage Best XI as follows:

Goalkeepers	Defenders	Midfielders	Forwards
Group Stage Best XI
(Egypt) Emad	(South Africa) Ramalepe (Egypt) Ghonim (Cameroon) Segning (Cameroon) Talla	(Morocco) Chebbak (Uganda) Nabukenya (Uganda) Nyinagahirwa	(Morocco) Tagnaout (Botswana) Tholakele (Ghana) Amoh

Coach: (Morocco) Hicham Drissi (AS FAR)

The CAF Technical Study Group announced the final Best XI as follows:

Goalkeepers	Defenders	Midfielders	Forwards
Group Stage Best XI
(Morocco) Er-Rmichi	(South Africa) Ramalepe (Cameroon) Segning (Cameroon) Talla (South Africa) Dhlamini	(Morocco) Chebbak (Uganda) Nabukenya (Cameroon) Menene	(Morocco) Tagnaout (Morocco) Touriss (South Africa) Donnelly

Coach: (Morocco) Hicham Drissi (AS FAR)

== See also ==
- 2026–27 CAF Champions League
- 2026–27 CAF Confederation Cup
- 2027 FIFA Women's Champions Cup
- 2028 FIFA Women's Club World Cup
