= Anitah Namata =

Ugandan footballer (born 2001)

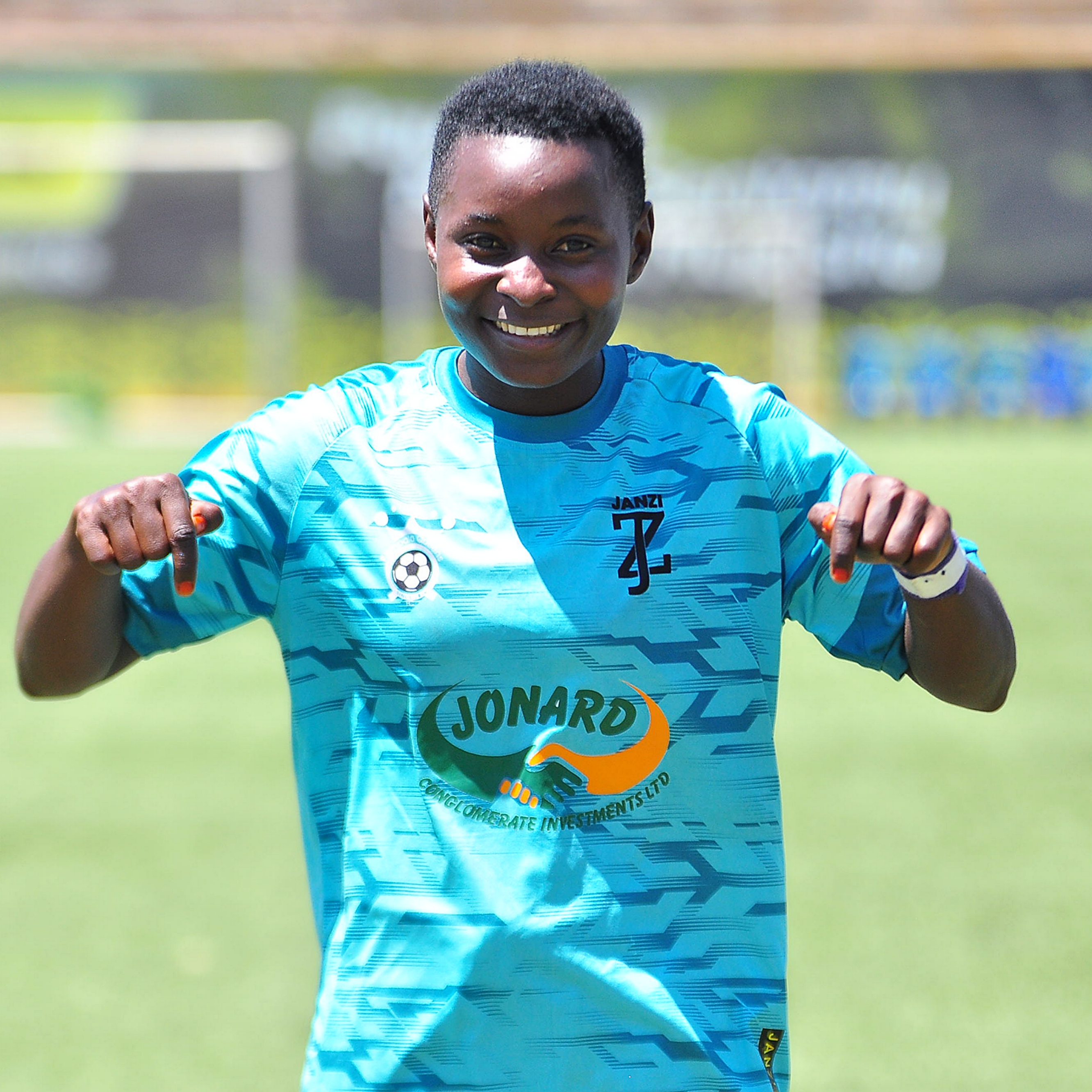
- Namata celebrating a goal she scored against Amus WFC

Personal information
- Full name: Anitah Namata
- Date of birth: 10 October 2001 (age 25)
- Place of birth: Entebbe Regional Hospital (Grade B)
- Positions: Forward; wing

Team information
- Current team: Kampala Queens FC

Anitah Namata (born 10 October 2001) is a Ugandan footballer who plays as a forward and wide midfielder for the Kampala Queens FC in the FUFA Women Super League.

== Educational background ==
Anitah Namata began her education at Agali Awamu Primary School in Kawafu. She proceeded to Princess Diana Secondary School for her Senior one and Senior two. Later, she transferred to Uganda Martyrs High School, Lubaga, where she completed her Ordinary Level studies in 2017, having been scouted by Coach Nkugwa and supported by Brother Leonard Nsubuga. Namata then joined Kawempe Muslim Secondary School (2018), a prominent institution for women’s football, where she studied history, economics, geography, and sub-mathematics, earning her Uganda Advanced Certificate of Education in 2019 with eight points.

== Career history ==
Anitah Namata began playing football at eight while attending Agali Awamu Primary School. Spotted by Coach Allan Kabonge, she joined the Lake Victoria Soccer Academy. She had a successful football journey, winning multiple school championships with Kawempe Muslim Secondary School. In 2022, she signed for She Corporate FC, where she competed in the CAF CECAFA Women Zonal Qualifiers and secured a silver medal. Later that year, she joined Vihiga Queens in Kenya, enjoying a stellar two-year spell, winning a league title, scoring ten goals, and providing seven assists in her final season. In January 2024, she returned to Uganda and joined Kampala Queens, where she continues to play.

== Club career ==
Club Levels
Year	Club
2018-2019	Kawempe Muslim Ladies FC
2021-2022	Uganda Martyrs Lubaga WFC
2022	She Corporate FC
2022-2023	Vihiga Queens FC (Kenya)
2024 to-date	Kampala Queens FC

Anitah has played for U20 National Team in 2019 when Uganda was playing against Tanzania. She has also played for the Senior team, Crested Cranes three times.

Trophies won
Year/Place	Game
2016, 2019 – Mbale	Fresh Diary School School Games
2018 – Mbale, 2019- Kasawo	UMEA Games
2016	Independence
2017 – Lira	Airtel Rising Stars
2018	FUFA Women Elite League
2018	Buganda Cup
2019 – Arusha	East Africa Secondary Schools
2022/2023 - Nakuru SG	Kenya Women's Premier League (KWPL)title

== International career ==
Internationally, Namata has played for Vihiga Queens in Kenya Women's Premier League. At Vihiga, she won a league title and earned individual accolades, solidifying her position as one of the top players in the region.
