= Shakirah Nyinagahirwa =

Ugandan footballer (born 2005)

Personal information
- Date of birth: July 25, 2005 (age 21)
- Position: Midfielder

Team information
- Current team: Kampala Queens FC

Senior career*
Years	Team	Apps	(Gls)
- Kawempe Muslim Ladies FC
- Kampala Queens FC (loan)

International career
- Uganda U-18
- * Club domestic league appearances and goals

Shakirah Nyinagahirwa (born 25 July 2005) is a Ugandan professional footballer who plays as a midfielder for Kampala Queens Football Club.

== Early life ==
Nyinagahirwa's parents were Sarah Nakabugo and Mustafah Funi. She attended Seeta church of Uganda primary school in Mukono. Later she attended Kawempe Muslim. Nyinagahirwa started her football journey while in primary school. She represented her district in Mubende during primary school games.

== Club career ==
Nyinagahirwa started her career seriously while playing for Kawempe Muslim Ladies FC before joining Kampala Queens FC on a six month loan.

In 2023 Nyinagahirwa was appointed captain during the Uganda national Women's u-18 by coach Ayub Khalifa.

For the 2022/2023 season in FUFA Women Super League, she was the Most Valuable Player (MVP) and top scorer.

== See also ==
- Fauzia Najjemba
- Hasifah Nassuna
- Uganda women's national football team
- Hasifah Nassuna
- Shamirah Nalugya
