= Firew Hailegebreal Asefa =

Ethiopian football coach

Firew Hailegebreal Asefa is an Ethiopian football tactician and head coach of the Uganda women's national football team.

== Career ==
In 2024, Asefa became the first international coach to lead a club in the FUFA Women Super League when he signed for the Kampala Queens FC. In his first 30 matches, he recorded 19 wins, 6 draws and 5 losses. He won the Finance Trust Bank FUFA Women Super League trophy, reached the semifinals of the FUFA Women’s Cup and also participated in the CAF Women’s Champions League CECAFA Zonal Qualifiers.

Asefa has also coached the Ethiopian women's national football team including the Ethiopia U20 head coach in 2021.

In 2026, he was appointed head coach of the Uganda women's football teams including the senior team (Crested Cranes), Queen Cranes (U20) and the Teen Cranes (U17).

== Honours ==
- 2024 - 2025: FUFA Women Super League Trophy.
- 2021: CECAFA Women's Championship.

== See also ==
- Sport in Ethiopia
