= Hadijah Nandago =

Ugandan footballer (born 2005)

Personal information
- Full name: Hadijah Nandago
- Date of birth: 15 February 2005 (age 21)
- Place of birth: Lungujja, Rubaga
- Position: Midfielder

Team information
- Current team: Kenya Police Bullets

Youth career
- Years: Team
- 2017: Rines SS
- 2018: Pride SS
2019-2024	Kawempe Muslim LFC		
2024-2025	Sethu FC		
2026-	Kenya Police Bullets		

Hadijah Nandago (born 15 February 2005) is a Ugandan professional footballer who plays as a midfielder for Kenya Police Bullets FC and Uganda women's national football team.

== Early life ==
Nandago was born to Abdalla Kitengejja and Mariam Namakula in Lungujja, Rubaga division, a suburb of Kampala and started playing football in primary four at Mirembe Infant Primary School in Nateete.

In 2017, Nandago joined Rines SS Women FC before joining Pride SS the following year.

== Club career ==
In 2019, She joined Kawempe Muslim Ladies FC before leaving for Indian women's super league side Sethu FC in January 2025.

In 2021, Nandago helped Isra Soccer Academy earn promotion while on a loan from Kawempe Muslim Ladies FC.

In August 2026, Nandago joined Kenya Police Bullets FC as a free agent after parting ways with Sethu FC.

At Kawempe Muslim Ladies FC, she guided the team to winning the 2023/24 FUFA women super league.

== International career ==
In 2024, Nandago was the captain of the U20 women's national team during the FIFA U20 women's world cup qualifiers.
