= Agnes Nabukenya =

Ugandan footballer (born 2008)

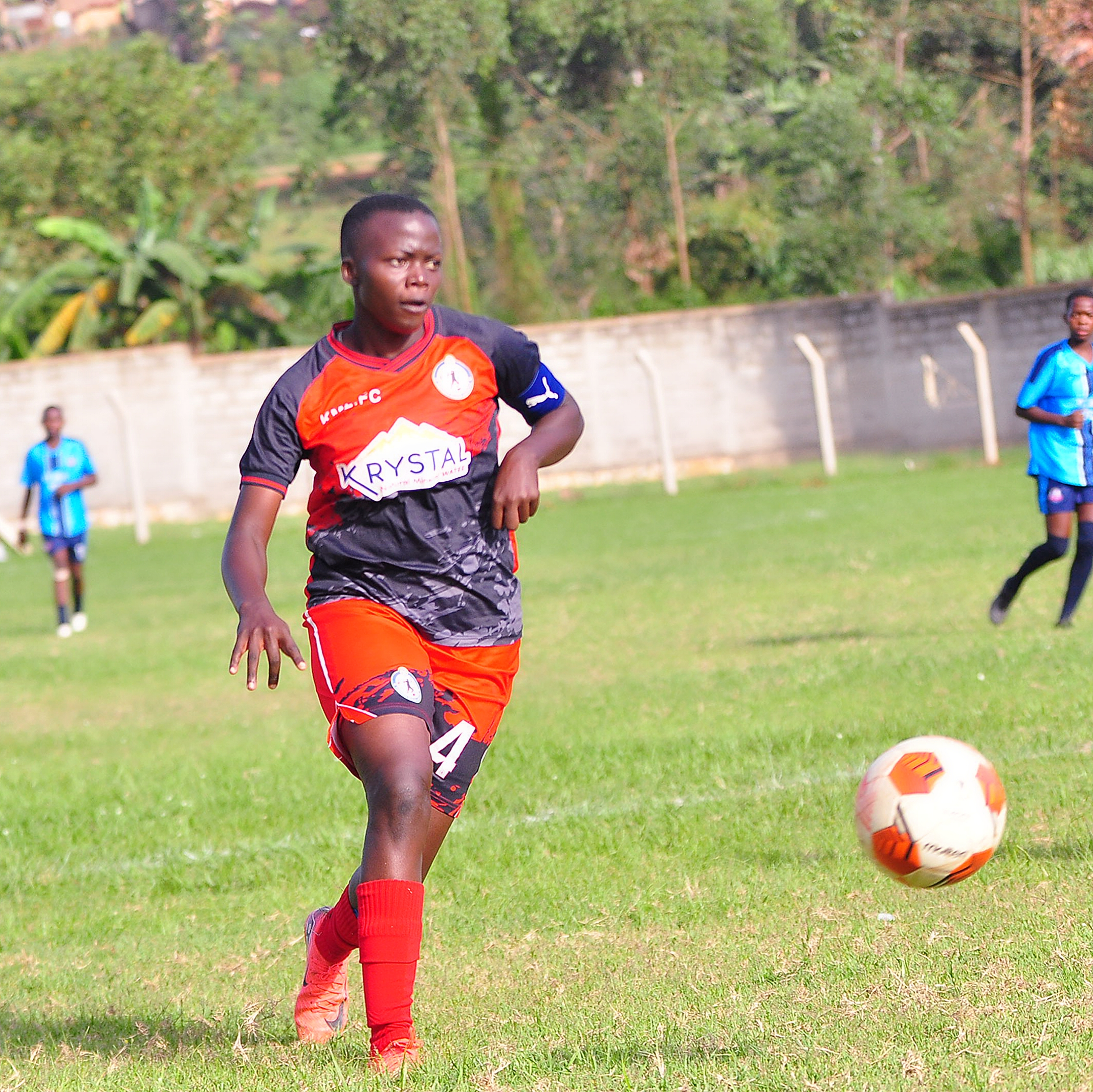
- Agnes Nabukenya

Personal information
- Full name: Agnes Nabukenya
- Date of birth: 10 October 2008 (age 18)
- Place of birth: Nakasongola
- Position: Midfielder

Team information
- Current team: Kawempe Muslim LFC
- Number: 4

Youth career
- Years: Team
- 2022–: Kawempe Muslim LFC

Agnes Nabukenya (born 10 October 2008) is a Ugandan footballer at Kawempe Muslim Ladies Football Club. The club has a Ugandan coach. Nabukenya together with fellow club members play in the FUFA Women Super League and have notable achievements.

== Education career ==
Agnes Nabukenya started her education at Mityana Kindergarten and Primary school in Mityana District, in 2018, she shifted to St Noa Junior School where she had only one year before joining Mukono Parents in 2019 where she sat her PLE in 2021.

In 2022, she joined Kawempe Muslim Secondary School where she is still studying from to present.

== Football career ==
She began her football career from St Noa Junior School while in Primary five, her club football career started at Kawempe Muslim Ladies Football Club in 2022. The football club has represented Uganda in the CAF Women's Champions League Zonal qualifiers . As a result of its performance, the Uganda Revenue Authority Club acquired the junior team for Kawempe Muslim Ladies Football Club making it the first women football team to join Uganda Revenue Authority.

In her first season at Kawempe Muslim Ladies Football Club, she scored no goal in the three appearances. Since 2022 to 2025, she has scored 23 goals in 72 appearances in all competitions at club level.

She was the Most Valuable player and joint top scorer (10 goals) of FUFA Women Super League 2023/24, she has also won the trophy with Kawempe.

Nabukenya helped Kawempe Muslim Ladies to the 2026 CAF Women's Champions League CECAFA Qualifiers and was named the player of the tournament. In the 2026 CAF Women's Champions League, she scored a brace and helped the stun holders AS FAR. She scored her second brace against USFAS Bamako and was named in the group stage Best XI after being the top scorer with 4 goals.

== International career ==
She joined national teams folds in 2023, played for U18, U17, U20 and the Uganda Women Senior team Crested Cranes.

Her national teams debut came in 2023 with the U18 youth team, played four matches and scored three goals, played four matches on U20, the same year and scored three goals.

In 2024 she played four matches on U17 national team and scored two goals, in the same year, she got her debut on the national senior team the Crested Cranes and played two matches but did not score. In 2025, Nabukenya played three matches for U17 in FIFA U-17 Women's World Cup qualifiers and she scored six goals in a single match against Namibia U-17 women football team.

In 2025, Agnes Nabukenya also played one match for national senior team the Crested Cranes.

== Honors ==
Kawempe Muslim Ladies

- FUFA Women Super League: 2023/24
- USSSA ball games one championship: 2024
- CAF Women's Champions League CECAFA Qualifiers: 2026

Individual

- 2022 CAF African Schools Football Championship qualifiers top scorer [8 goals]
- 2023/24: FUFA Women Super League MVP
- 2023/24: FUFA Women Super League joint top scorer [10 goals]
- 2025: USSSA ball games one championship top scorer [15 goals]
- 2026 CAF Women's Champions League CECAFA Qualifiers: Player of the tournament
- 2026 CAF Women's Champions League: Group Stage Best XI

== See also ==
- Shamirah Nalugya
- Fauzia Najjemba
