= Jovia Nakagolo =

Ugandan footballer

Personal information
- Nationality: Ugandan

Sport
- Sport: Football

Jovia Nakagolo (born July 23, 2005) is a Ugandan footballer who plays as a forward. She represents Kawempe Muslim LFC in the Ugandan women's league. She was named most valuable player (MVP) in the 2025 FUFA Women's Cup.

== Career ==
Jovia played for UCU Lady Cardinals FC in the national cup competition. She later joined Kawempe Muslim LFC initially on a loan and later on a three year contract ahead of 2025/26 Finance Trust Bank FUFA Women Super League season.Kawempe Muslim LFC supported her Education at Uganda Christian university.

== Awards ==
Nakagolo was named the 2025 FUFA Women's Cup Most valuable player.
