= Burundi Women's Championship =

Highest division of league competition for Burundi women's football

- Founded: 2005; 21 years ago
- Country: Burundi
- Confederation: CAF
- Number of clubs: 10
- Level on pyramid: 1
- International cup: CECAFA Women's Champions League
- Current champions: Top Girls Academy (1st title) (2024–25)
- Most championships: Fofila PF (5 titles)
- Current: 2026

The Burundi Women's Championship or Ligue A is the highest level of league competition for women's football in Burundi. It is the women's equivalent of the men's Burundi Ligue A. Starting with the 2021, the league champion will qualify for the CAF Women's Champions League CECAFA Qualifiers.

== List of Champions ==
Season	Champion
2008	unknown
2009	unknown
2010	unknown
2011	La Colombe FC
2012	Kerebuka
2013	La Colombe FC
2014	La Colombe FC
2015	Fofila PF
2016	New Girls Wanainchi
2017	Fofila PF
2018	Fofila PF
2019	Fofila PF
2020	Fofila PF
2021	PVP Buyenzi
2022	not held
2023	Buja Queens
2024	PVP Buyenzi
2025	Top Girls Academy
