= PVP Buyenzi =

Burundi women's football team

- Full name: PVP Buyenzi
- Founded: 1988; 37 years ago
- League: Burundi Women's Championship

The PVP Buyenzi is a Burundi women's football club competing in the Burundi Women's Championship. The club is based in the city of Bujumbura.

== History ==
PVP Buyenzi won the championship in the 2020–2021 season, finishing ahead of Fofila PF. In August 2021, PVP Buyenzi claimed victory in the inaugural First Lady's Cup by defeating Fofila PF 4–2 in the final, which qualified them for the CECAFA tournament for the 2021 CAF Women's Champions League. During the tournament, the team finished third in their group, behind the Ugandan Lady Doves and the Tanzanian Simba Queens.

In the 2023–2024 season, PVP Buyenzi regained their crown by surpassing the reigning champions, the Buja Queens, in the championship.

== Honours ==
Type	Competition	Titles	Winning Seasons	Runners-up
Domestic	Burundi Women's Championship	2	2021, 2024	
Domestic	Burundi Women's Cup	1	2021	

== See also ==
- Burundi Women's Championship
- Burundi Women's Cup
- CAF Women's Champions League
