= Joëlle Bukuru =

Burundian footballer

Personal information
- Date of birth: 13 February 1999 (age 27)
- Place of birth: Burundi
- Position: Midfielder

Team information
- Current team: Simba Queens

Senior career*
Years	Team	Apps	(Gls)
- Simba Queens

International career^{‡}
2021–	Burundi	2	(0)
- * Club domestic league appearances and goals ‡ National team caps and goals as of 21 February 2022.

Joëlle Bukuru (born 13 February 1999) is a Burundian footballer who plays as a midfielder for Simba Queens and Burundi women's national team.
