= 2022 CAF Women's Champions League CECAFA Qualifiers =

Tournament details
- Host country: Tanzania
- City: Dar es Salaam
- Dates: 15–27 August 2022
- Teams: 8 (from 8 associations)
- Venues: 2 (in 1 host city)

Final positions
- Champions: (Tanzania) Simba Queens FC (1st title)
- Runners-up: (Uganda) She Corporate FC
- Third place: (Ethiopia) CBE F.C.
- Fourth place: (Rwanda) AS Kigali WFC

Tournament statistics
- Matches played: 16
- Goals scored: 72 (4.5 per match)
- Top scorer: (Ethiopia) Loza Abera (11 goals)
- Best player: (Kenya) Vivian Corazon Aquino
- Best goalkeeper: (Tanzania) Gelwa Yona
- Fair play award: (Rwanda) AS Kigali WFC
- All statistics correct as of 27 August 2022.

The 2022 CAF Women's Champions League CECAFA Qualifiers is the 2nd edition of the CAF Women's Champions League CECAFA Qualifiers, a women's club football championship organised by the CECAFA for the women's clubs of association nations. This edition will held from 28 July to 10 August 2022 in Arusha, Tanzania. but it was moved to August 14-27th in Dar es salaam, Tanzania

The winner of the tournament will qualify for the inaugural 2022 CAF Women's Champions League which will held later this year.

== Participating clubs ==
Team	Appearances	Previous best performance
(Burundi) Fofila PF	1st	n/a
(Djibouti) Garde Republic FC	1st	n/a
Commercial Bank of Ethiopia FC	2nd	Runner up(2021)
(Rwanda) AS Kigali WFC	1st	n/a
(South Sudan) Yei Join Star FC	2nd	Groupe stage(2021)
(Tanzania) Simba Queens FC (Host)	2nd	3rd(2021)
(Uganda) She Corporate FC	1st	n/a
(Zanzibar) Warriors QFC	1st	n/a

== Venues ==
Cities	Venues	Capacity
Miburani	National Stadium	60,000
Dar es Salaam	Azam Complex Stadium	10,000

== Match officials ==
Referees

- (Burundi) Suavis Iratunga
- (Egypt) Shahenda Saad Ali Emaghrabi
- (Eswatini) letticia Antonella Viana
- (Ethiopia) Tsehaynesh Abebe
- (Ivory Coast) Zomadre Sonia Kore
- (Namibia) Antsino Twanyanyukwa
- (Rwanda) Salima Mukansanga
- (Uganda) Shamirah Nabadda
- (Tanzania) Zablon Chief Florentina

Assistant Referees

- (Burundi) Fides Bangurambona
- (Egypt) Yara Atef
- (Morocco) Soukaina Hamdi
- (Rwanda) Alice Umutoni
- (South Sudan) Jane Charles
- (Uganda) Marex Nkumbi
- (Tanzania) Groly Tesha
- (Tanzania) Janet Balama

== Draw ==
The draw for this edition of the tournament was held on 20 July 2022 at 11:00 UTC (13:00 CAT) in Morocco. The eight teams were drawn into 2 group of 4 teams with teams finishing first and second in the groups qualifying for the knockout stages.

Group A	Group B
(Rwanda) AS Kigali WFC Commercial Bank of Ethiopia FC (Zanzibar) Warriors QFC (Burundi) Fofila PF	(Djibouti) Garde Republic FC (South Sudan) Yei Join Star FC (Uganda) She Corporate FC (Tanzania) Simba Queens FC

== Group stage ==
The tournament was played in a two groups format.

Tiebreakers

Teams are ranked according to points (3 points for a win, 1 point for a draw, 0 points for a loss), and if tied on points, the following tiebreaking criteria are applied, in the order given, to determine the rankings.

1. Points in head-to-head matches among tied teams;
2. Goal difference in head-to-head matches among tied teams;
3. Goals scored in head-to-head matches among tied teams;
4. If more than two teams are tied, and after applying all head-to-head criteria above, a subset of teams are still tied, all head-to-head criteria above are reapplied exclusively to this subset of teams;
5. Goal difference in all group matches;
6. Goals scored in all group matches;
7. Penalty shoot-out if only two teams are tied and they met in the last round of the group;
8. Disciplinary points (yellow card = 1 point, red card as a result of two yellow cards = 3 points, direct red card = 3 points, yellow card followed by direct red card = 4 points);
9. Drawing of lots.

Time UTC +3

=== Group A ===
Pos	Team	Pld	W	D	L	GF	GA	GD	Pts	Qualification	CBE	ASK	FPF	WQFC
1	(Ethiopia) CBE FC	3	3	0	0	16	1	+15	9	Semi-finals	—		5–1	9–0
2	(Rwanda) AS Kigali WFC	3	2	0	1	5	3	+2	6	Semi-finals	0–2	—		3–0
3	(Burundi) Fofila PF	3	1	0	2	5	7	−2	3			1–2	—	3–0
4	(Zanzibar) Warriors QFC	3	0	0	3	0	15	−15	0					—

15 August 2022
13:00 UTC+3

CBE FC (Ethiopia)	9–0	(Zanzibar) Warriors QFC
Busser 9', 24', 31', 33'; Abera 41', 70', 74', 77', 81'	Report

Azam Complex Stadium, Dar es Salaam, Tanzania
Referee: Shamirah Nabadda (Uganda)
15 August 2022
16:00 UTC+3

Fofila PF (Burundi)	1–2	(Rwanda) AS Kigali WFC
Kankidi 4'	Report	Usanase 27', 64'

Azam Complex Stadium, Dar es Salaam, Tanzania
Referee: Sonia Kore (Ivory Coast)

18 August 2022
13:00 UTC+3

CBE FC (Ethiopia)	5–1	(Burundi) Fofila PF
Busser 15'; Getenet 17'; Abera 21', 63', 74'	Report	Irankunda 40'

Azam Complex Stadium, Dar es Salaam, Tanzania
Referee: Shahenda Saad Ali Emaghrabi (Egypt)
18 August 2022
16:00 UTC+3

AS Kigali WFC (Rwanda)	3–0	(Zanzibar) Warriors QFC
Usanase 12', 63', 68'	Report

Azam Complex Stadium, Dar es Salaam, Tanzania
Referee: Zablon Chief Florentina (Tanzania)

21 August 2022
16:00 UTC+3

CBE FC (Ethiopia)	2-0	(Rwanda) AS Kigali WFC
Abera 59'; Busser 70'	Report

Azam Complex Stadium, Dar es Salaam, Tanzania
21 August 2022
16:00 UTC+3

Fofila PF (Burundi)	3-0	(Zanzibar) Warriors QFC
Saidi 7'; Irankuda 70'; Uwenea 50'	Report

National Stadium, Dar es Salaam, Tanzania

=== Group B ===
Pos	Team	Pld	W	D	L	GF	GA	GD	Pts	Qualification	SQ	SCP	YJS	GRFC
1	(Tanzania) Simba Queens	3	3	0	0	12	0	+12	9	Semi-finals	—	2–0	4–0	
2	(Uganda) She Corporate	3	2	0	1	18	2	+16	6	Semi-finals		—	6–0	
3	(South Sudan) Yei Joint Stars	3	1	0	2	6	10	−4	3				—	
4	(Djibouti) GRFC	3	0	0	3	0	20	−20	0		0–6	0–8	0–6	—

14 August 2022
13:00 UTC+3

She Corporate (Uganda)	6–0	(South Sudan) Yei Joint Stars
Nabbuma 28', 53'; Namata 32'; Namiru 45+2'; Nambatya 73'; Ainembabazi 86'	Report

National Stadium, Dar es Salaam, Tanzania
Referee: Antsino Twanyanyukwa (Namibia)
14 August 2022
16:00 UTC+3

GRFC (Djibouti)	0–6	(Tanzania) Simba Queens
	Report	Kuzoya 30'; Barakat 32', 81'; Djafari 41', 69'; Bakuru 51'

National Stadium, Dar es Salaam, Tanzania
Referee: Letticia Viana (Eswatini)

17 August 2022
13:00 UTC+3

Simba Queens (Tanzania)	2–0	(Uganda) She Corporate
Corazone 21'; Kuzoya 61'	Report

National Stadium, Dar es Salaam, Tanzania
Referee: Salima Mukansanga (Rwanda)
17 August 2022
16:00 UTC+3

GRFC (Djibouti)	0–6	(South Sudan) Yei Joint Stars
	Report	Luiz 11', 63'; Debora 19', 34', 56', 68'

National Stadium, Dar es Salaam, Tanzania
Referee: Tsehaynesh Abebe (Ethiopia)

20 August 2022
16:00 UTC+3

Simba Queens (Tanzania)	4–0	(South Sudan) Yei Joint Stars
Corazone 16'; Abakah 22', 63'; Clement 31'	Report

National Stadium, Dar es Salaam, Tanzania
Referee: Suavis Iratunga (Burundi)
20 August 2022
16:00 UTC+3

GRFC (Djibouti)	0–8	(Uganda) She Corporate
	Report	Nambatya 3', 36', 55'; Nabbuma 5', 20', 89'; Nakasi 6'; Ainembabazi 41'

Azam Complex Stadium, Dar es Salaam, Tanzania
Referee: Sonia Kore (Ivory Coast)

== Knockout stage ==
=== Bracket ===
Semifinals
August 24–
(Tanzania) Simba Queens	5
(Rwanda) AS Kigali WFC	1
August 24–
(Ethiopia) CBE FC	1
(Uganda) She Corporate	2

Final
August 27 –
(Uganda) She Corporate	0
(Tanzania) Simba Queens	1
Third place
August 27–
(Ethiopia) CBE FC	3
(Rwanda) AS Kigali WFC	1

=== Semi-finals ===
24 August 2022
13:00

Simba Queens (Tanzania)	5-1	(Rwanda) AS Kigali WFC
Aquino 15', 47'; Clement 30'; Manunka 38'; Mnally 85'	Report	Mukeshimana 28'

National Stadium

24 August 2022
16:00

CBE FC (Ethiopia)	1-2	(Uganda) She Corporate
Abera 62'	Report	Namata 20'; Nabbuma 75'

National Stadium

=== Third place match ===
27 August 2022
12:00

(Rwanda) AS Kigali WFC	1-3	(Ethiopia) CBE FC
Aregash 63' (o.g.)	Report	Loza Abera 9'; Hasabe Gila 32'; Aregash 45+1'

National Stadium

=== Final ===
27 August 2022
15:00

(Tanzania) Simba Queens	1-0	(Uganda) She Corporate
Corazone 46' (.pen)	Report

[[Azam Complex Chamazi (Tanzania)

== Statistics ==
=== Goalscorers ===
There have been 72 goals scored in 16 matches, for an average of 4.5 goals per match (as of 27 August 2022).

Rank	Player	Team	Goals
1	(Ethiopia) Loza Abera	(Ethiopia) CBE F.C.	11
2	(Ethiopia) Medina Busser	(Ethiopia) CBE F.C.	6
3	(Uganda) Phiona Nabbuma	(Uganda) She Corporate FC	6
4	(Rwanda) Zawadi Usanase	(Rwanda) AS Kigali WFC	5
5	(South Sudan) Alworonga Debora	(South Sudan) Yei Joint Stars	4
5	(Uganda) Favour Nambatya	(Uganda) She Corporate FC	4
7	(Kenya) Vivian Corazone	(Tanzania) Simba Queens	3
8	(Nigeria) Olaiya Barakat	(Tanzania) Simba Queens	2
8	(Burundi) Asha Djafari	(Tanzania) Simba Queens	2
8	(Democratic Republic of the Congo) Pambani Kuzoya	(Tanzania) Simba Queens	2
8	(Ghana) Philomena Abakah	(Tanzania) Simba Queens	2
8	(Uganda) Joanita Ainembabazi	(Uganda) She Corporate FC	2
8	(South Sudan) Mariam Luiz	(South Sudan) Yei Joint Stars	2
8	(Burundi) Charlotte Irankunda	(Burundi) Fofila PF	2
8	(Uganda) Anita Namata	(Uganda) She Corporate FC	2
8	(Tanzania) Opa Clement	(Tanzania) Simba Queens	2
8	(Kenya) Corazone Aquino	(Tanzania) Simba Queens	2
18	(Uganda) Margaret Namiru	(Uganda) She Corporate FC	1
18	(Uganda) Jackline Nakasi	(Uganda) She Corporate FC	1
18	(Burundi) Joëlle Bukuru	(Tanzania) Simba Queens	1
18	(Burundi) Fatuma Kankidi	(Burundi) Fofila PF	1
18	(Burundi) Sakina Saidi	(Burundi) Fofila PF	1
18	(Burundi) Drazila Uwenea	(Burundi) Fofila PF	1
18	(Ethiopia) Nardos Getenet	(Ethiopia) CBE F.C.	1
18	(Tanzania) Aisha Juma Manunka	(Tanzania) Simba Queens	1
18	(Tanzania) Diana William Mnally	(Tanzania) Simba Queens	1
18	(Rwanda) Dorothee Mukeshimana	(Rwanda) AS Kigali WFC	1
18	(Ethiopia) Hasabe Gila	(Ethiopia) CBE F.C.	1
18	(Ethiopia) Aregash	(Ethiopia) CBE F.C.	1

- own goal

Rank	Player	Team	Goals
1	(Ethiopia) Aregash	(Ethiopia) CBE FC	1
