= Senaf Wakuma =

Ethiopian footballer (born 1999)

Personal information
- Full name: Senaf Wakuma Demise
- Date of birth: 23 September 1999 (age 27)
- Position: Forward

Team information
- Current team: Simba Queens
- Number: 19

Senior career*
Years	Team	Apps	(Gls)
2018–2020	Adama City	20	(21)
2020–2023	Mechal		
2023–2025	CBE		
2025–2026	Mechal		
2026–	Simba Queens		

International career
2017	Ethiopia U20		
2018–	Ethiopia		(6)
- * Club domestic league appearances and goals

Senaf Wakuma Demise (Amharic: ሰናፍ ዋቁማ ደምሴ; born 23 September 1999) is an Ethiopian professional footballer who plays as a forward for Tanzanian Women's Premier League club Simba Queens and the Ethiopia national team.

== Club career ==
A product of the Tirunesh Dibaba Training Center, she went on to play for Ethiopian top-flight clubs Adama City, Mechal, and CBE.

In 2019, Wakuma helped Adama City win its first Ethiopian Women's Premier League title, scoring 21 goals in 20 matches to claim the Golden Boot. Following her performances that season, she travelled to Sweden in June for a two-week trial.

In the 2022–23 season with Mechal, Wakuma scored 16 goals.

During the 2024 CAF Women's Champions League CECAFA Qualifiers, Wakuma helped CBE win the tournament for the first time, scoring six goals, including the winning goal in the final, to finish as the tournament's top scorer. Later, in November 2024, at the final tournament, she scored CBE's only goal of the campaign.

In Late July 2026, Wakuma joined Tanzanian Women's Premier League side Simba Queens on a one-year deal.

== International career ==
Wakuma first represented Ethiopia at under-20 level during the 2018 African U-20 Women's World Cup qualification.

In April 2018, Wakuma was called up to the Ethiopia senior national team for the 2018 Women's Africa Cup of Nations qualification matches against Libya. In July of the same year, she scored her first goal for the team against 2018 CECAFA Women's Championship hosts Rwanda.

=== International goals ===
Scores and results list Ethiopia's goal tally first, score column indicates score after each Wakuma goal.

No.	Date	Venue	Opponent	Score	Result	Competition	Ref.
1	23 July 2018	Kigali Stadium, Kigali, Rwanda	Rwanda	3–0	3–0	2018 CECAFA Championship	
2	21 November 2019	Azam Complex Stadium, Dar es Salaam, Tanzania	Djibouti	1–0	8–0	2019 CECAFA Championship	
3	21 November 2019	Azam Complex Stadium, Dar es Salaam, Tanzania	Djibouti	5–0	8–0	2019 CECAFA Championship	
4	26 October 2021	Bahir Dar International Stadium, Bahir Dar, Ethiopia	Uganda	1–0	2–0	2022 WAfCON qualification	
5	16 July 2023	Abebe Bikila Stadium, Addis Ababa, Ethiopia	Chad	2–0	4–0	2024 Olympic qualifying tournament	
6	16 July 2023	Abebe Bikila Stadium, Addis Ababa, Ethiopia	Chad	3–0	4–0	2024 Olympic qualifying tournament	
