= Annette Kundu =

Kenyan footballer (born 1996)

Personal information
- Full name: Annedy Kwamasi Kundu
- Date of birth: 17 December 1996 (age 29)
- Place of birth: Kakamega, Kenya
- Position: Goalkeeper

Team information
- Current team: Nees Atromitou
- Number: 1

Senior career*
| Years | Team | Apps | (Gls) |
- Ibinzo Girls
| 2016–2019 | Eldoret Falcons | | |
| 2020 | Lakatamia | | |
| 2020–2021 | AEL Limassol | 1 | (0) |
| 2021–2022 | Neos Asteras Rethymno | | |
| 2022–2023 | REA | 15 | (0) |
| 2023– | Nees Atromitou | | |

International career
- Kenya
- * Club domestic league appearances and goals

Annedy Kwamasi Kundu (born 17 December 1996), known as Annette Kundu, is a Kenyan footballer who plays as a goalkeeper for the Kenya women's national team.

== International career ==
Kundu capped for Kenya at senior level during the 2019 CECAFA Women's Championship.

== See also ==
- List of Kenya women's international footballers
