= Kampala Queens FC =

Ugandan women's association football club

- Full name: Kampala Queens Football Club
- Nickname: Queens of Soccer
- Founded: 2016
- Manager: Asefa Firew Hailegebreal
- League: FUFA Women Super League
- 2024–25: Champions
- Website: https://kqfc.co.ug/
Home colours

Kampala Queens FC is a Ugandan professional association football club based in Kampala, Uganda. The club competes in the FUFA Women Super League, the top tier of women's football in Uganda.

== History ==
Kampala Queens Football Club was founded in 2016. Kampala Queens FC, known as the "Queens of Soccer" by fans, won the FUFA Women Super League 2022/23 season title with 47 points from 18 games, 15 wins, 2 draws and one loss that came at the hands of the FUFA Women Super League record champions Kawempe Muslim Ladies.

Kampala Queens FC secured a club sponsorship agreement with Jonard Conglomerate Investments Limited worth Uganda Shillings 200 million for two years from 2024 to 2026. The deal was unveiled at a function that was held at Jevine Hotel, Rubaga, Kampala.

Kampala Queens competed in the CAF Women's Champions League in 2023. The Queens of Soccer reached the CAF quarter finals against CBE FC which ended in a draw, they needed three points to progress to the semi-finals.

In 2023, Uganda Premier League club Kampal Capital City Authority FC entered into a three-year partnership with Kampala Queens in a deal that would see the Queens of Soccer as their official women's football club from July 1, 2023, to June 30, 2026.

== Honours ==
Type	Competition	Titles	Winning Seasons	Runners-up
FUFA	FUFA Women Super League	Winners	2022/23	1

== Manager ==
The current head coach of Kampala Queens FC is Firew Hailegebreal Asefa, an Ethiopian tactician who was appointed in November 2024.
