= FUFA Women Super League =

Association football league in Uganda

Finance Trust Bank FUFA Women Super League
- Founded: 2019; 7 years ago
- Country: Uganda
- Confederation: CAF (Africa)
- Number of clubs: 12
- Level on pyramid: 1
- Relegation to: FUFA Women Elite League
- Domestic cup: FUFA Women's Cup
- International cup: CAF W-Champions League
- Current champions: Kawempe Muslim LFC (2025–26)
- Most championships: Kampala Queens, Kawempe Muslim LFC (2 titles)
- Top scorer: Jesca Namanda and Latifah Nakasi 15 goals
- Broadcaster(s): FUFA TV
- Sponsor(s): Finance Trust Bank
- Current: 2026–27

The FUFA Women Super League (FWSL), also known as the Finance Trust Bank FUFA Women Super League for sponsorship reasons, is a professional association football league and the highest level of women's football in Uganda. Currently operated by Federation of Uganda Football Associations, the league was established in 2019 by FUFA and features twelve fully professional teams. The league replaced the FUFA Women Elite League as the highest level of women's football in Uganda, with eight teams competing in the inaugural 2019–20 season.

In 2019, the Women Super League was introduced to the Ugandan women's football system with the FUFA Women Elite League re-organized as the second division under the Women Super League. The inaugural season of the Women Super League which started with 8 teams, abruptly ended in May 2020 due to the COVID-19 pandemic.

== History ==
The league is the successor of the Elite Women Football League, which ran for five years. That league was played in regional groups that played play-offs for the championship afterwards. The championship finals were:

- 2014–15: Kawempe 3-2 Buikwe
- 2015–16: Kawempe Muslim 0-0 (4–2 pen) She Corporates
- 2016–17: Kawempe Muslim 4-0 UCU Cardinals
- 2017–18: Kawempe Muslim 1-0 Olila Women
- 2018–19: UCU Lady Cardinals 2-0 Lady Dove

== Clubs ==
- Kawempe Muslim LFC
- Uganda Martyrs Lubaga
- Lady Doves FC
- She Corporates
- Asubo Ladies FC
- Kampala Queens FC
- Olila Women FC
- St Noa Girls FC
- She Maroons
- Rines SS W FC
- Amus College W FC
- Makerere University W FC

== Champions ==
list of champions

- 2019–20: abandoned
- 2020–21: Lady Doves FC
- 2021–22: She Corporate FC
- 2022–23: Kampala Queens FC
- 2023–24: Kawempe Muslim LFC
- 2024–25: Kampala Queens FC
- 2025-26: Kawempe Muslim LFC
