= Simba Queens =

Tanzanian women's football club

- Full name: Simba Queens Soccer Club
- Ground: Tanzania National Stadium
- Capacity: 60,000
- Manager: Yusif Basigi
- Coach: Sebastian Leonard Nkoma
- League: Tanzanian Women's Premier League
- 2024–25: 2nd
- Website: https://simbasc.co.tz/simba-queens/

Simba Queens Soccer Club is a Tanzanian professional women's football club affiliated to Simba S.C. and based in Kariakoo, Dar es Salaam, that competes in the Tanzanian Women's Premier League, the top-flight of Tanzanian women's football.

The club has participated in every edition of the CECAFA Women's Champions League since its 2021 establishment, winning the 2022 edition 1-0 against She Corporate F.C. of Uganda to qualify for that year's CAF Women's Champions League in Morocco that November.

–==Players==

== Current squad ==
As of 15 August 2022

Note: Flags indicate national team as defined under FIFA eligibility rules; some limited exceptions apply. Players may hold more than one non-FIFA nationality.

No.	Pos.	Nation	Player
2	MF	COD	S'arrive Badiambila
4	MF	KEN	Vivian Corazone
5	DF	TAN	Fatuma Issa (captain)
7	FW	TAN	Opah Clement
8	FW	TAN	Zainabu Mohamed
10	FW	TAN	Aisha Juma
11	DF	TAN	Doto Evarist
12	DF	TAN	Silvia Mwacha
13	FW	KEN	Topister Situma
14	FW	TAN	Amina Ramadhani

No.	Pos.	Nation	Player
15	MF	TAN	Diana William
17	FW	COD	Falonne Pambani
18	MF	BDI	Joëlle Bukuru
21	GK	TAN	Gelwa Yonah
22	DF	COD	Danny Ngoyi
23	DF	TAN	Esther Mayala
24	MF	BDI	Asha Djafari
26	DF	TAN	Violeth Nicholaus
27	FW	GHA	Philomena Abakah
29	GK	TAN	Zubeda Mgunda
