= Kenya Police Bullets =

Association football women's club

- Full name: Kenya Police Bullets
- Founded: 2009; 17 years ago As Thika Queens Football Club
- Ground: Thika Municipal StadiumKenya
- Capacity: 5 000
- Head coach: Benta Achieng
- League: Kenyan Women's Premier League
- 2020–21: Kenyan Women's Premier League 1st of 16 (champions)

Kenya Police Bullets, is a Kenyan professional women's football club based in Thika, Kiambu County, Kenya, that participates in Kenyan Women's Premier League, the top tier of Kenyan football.

The club has won the Premier League title on three occasions in 2014–15, 2016–17 and 2020–21 seasons. The club is affiliated to men's team of Thika United who have been competing in the Kenya Premier League.

== Honours ==
=== Domestic ===
League titles

- Kenyan Women's Premier League

Winners (record) (3): 2014–15, 2016–17, 2020–21

== Managerial history ==
- (Kenya) Richard Kanyi (–May 2017)
- (Kenya) Benta Achieng (May 2017–)

== See also ==
- Vihiga Queens
- Kenyan Women's Premier League
- CAF Women's Champions League
