= Kawempe Muslim LFC =

Ugandan women's football team

Kawempe Muslim
- Full name: Kawempe Muslim Ladies Football Club
- Nickname: Valley Warriors
- Founded: 2015
- Ground: The Valley
- Head Coach: Ayub Khalifah Kiyingi
- League: FUFA Women Super League
- 2025/26: Champions

Kawempe Muslim Ladies Football Club is a Ugandan professional women's association football club based in Kampala, Uganda. The club competes in the FUFA Women Super League, the top tier of women's football in Uganda. They are nicknamed the Valley Warriors.

== History ==
The club was founded in 2015. Between 2015 and 2018, Kawempe Ladies Football Club won four consecutive championships. In the 2018 season, the club experienced a transitional period after several key players moved to rival side UCU Lady Cardinals FC.

In the 2023–24 season, the club reclaimed the FUFA Women Super League title, finishing top of the table ahead of Kampala Queens FC. The league victory qualified Kawempe Muslim Ladies Football Club to represent Uganda in the 2024 CAF Women’s Champions League qualifiers.

Kawempe also clinched the 2025/2026 Finance Trust Bank FUFA Women Super League title on the final day after their 3-1 home victory over Olila HS WFC while She Corporate FC who came into the final match day leading the standings drew 0-0 with She Maroons, and this enabled Kawempe win the trophy by only one point.

In 2026, Kawempe Muslim Ladies FC became the first Ugandan women football club to qualify for the CAF Women’s Champions League final tournament.

== Stadium ==
Kawempe Muslim Ladies Football Club's home ground is officially known as the Kawempe Muslim Ground. It is also known as The Valley. However, as the 2026 /2027 Finance Trust Bank FUFA Women Super League campaign kicked off, Kawempe Muslim Ladies FC shifted to St. Mary’s Stadium in Kitende, home for their Male club partner Vipers SC.

== Major achievements ==
- CAF Women's Champions League 2026 Qualifiers CECAFA region: Winners against Kenya Police Bullets (1-0, goal scored by Agnes Nabukenya)
- FUFA Women Super League Champions: Record five-time winners of the top-flight league (2015, 2016, 2017, 2018, 2024, 2026)
- FUFA Women's Cup finalist: Reached the final in 2025 and 2026
- CECAFA: 2024 bronze medalist
- CECAFA Women's Championship winners 2026.

== Honours ==
| Type | Competition | Titles | Winning seasons | Runners-up |
|---|---|---|---|---|
| Domestic | FUFA Women Super League | 6 | 2015, 2016, 2017, 2018, 2024, 2026 | |
| Domestic | Uganda Women's Cup | 0 | | |
| East Africa | CECAFA Women's Championship | 1 | 2026 | |

== Manager ==
Since 2015, the club is coached by Ayub Khalifah Kiyingi.

== Current team ==
The list of Kawempe Muslim Ladies Football Club players is as follows.

| No. | Name | Shirt no. | Position |
|---|---|---|---|
| 1 | Agnes Nabukenya | 4 | Midfielder |
| 2 | Aminah Nakato | 2 | Defender |
| 3 | Asia Nakibuuka | 23 | Midfielder |
| 4 | Dorcus Kisakye | 22 | AttackingMidfilder |
| 5 | Jovia Nakagolo | 13 | Forward |
| 6 | Juliet Adeke | 1 | Goal keeper |
| 7 | Latifah Nakasi | 17 | Forward |
| 8 | Meble Adongo | 19 | Midfielder |
| 9 | Ritah Mushimire | 5 | Defender |
| 10 | Saidah Namwanje | 20 | Goal keeper |
| 11 | Samalie Nakachwa | 9 | Defender |
| 12 | Shadia Nabirye | 12 | Forward |
| 13 | Sharifah | 16 | Midfielder |
| 14 | Sumaya Nabuto | | Forward |
| 15 | Zaina Namboozo | 21 | Defensive Midfielder |
| 16 | Anitah Namata | 11 | Midfielder |

== See also ==
- FUFA Women Super League
- CAF Women's Champions League
- Kampala Queens FC
