= CBE F.C. =

Ethiopian women's football club

Commercial Bank of Ethiopia Football Club (Women)
- Nickname: Nigd Bank
- Founded: 2005
- League: Ethiopian Women's Premier League

CBE is an Ethiopian professional women's football club based in Addis Ababa, Ethiopia. The club features in the Ethiopian Women's Premier League. The club is affiliated to CBE SA.
