= 2023 CAF Women's Champions League CECAFA Qualifiers =

Tournament details
- Host country: Uganda
- City: Kampala
- Dates: 12 – 30 August 2023
- Teams: 9 (from 9 associations)
- Venues: 2 (in 1 host city)

Final positions
- Champions: (Tanzania) JKT Queens (1st title)
- Runners-up: (Ethiopia) CBE F.C.
- Third place: (Burundi) Buja Queens
- Fourth place: (Kenya) Vihiga Queens F.C.

Tournament statistics
- Matches played: 20
- Goals scored: 55 (2.75 per match)
- Top scorer: (Uganda) Fazila Ikwaput (8 goals)
- Best player: (Tanzania) Stumai Abdallah Athumani
- Best goalkeeper: (Tanzania) Najiat Abass Idrisa
- Fair play award: (Uganda) Kampala Queens FC

The 2023 CAF Women's Champions League CECAFA Qualifiers was the 3rd edition of the annual women's association football club championship organized by CECAFA to determine its representative at the 2023 CAF Women's Champions League in Ivory Coast. It was held in Kampala, Uganda from 12 to 30 August 2023.

== Participating clubs ==
Team	Appearances	Previous best performance
(Burundi) Buja Queens	1st	N/A
(Djibouti) FAD Club	2nd	Group stage (2021)
(Ethiopia) CBE	3rd	Runner up (2021)
(Kenya) Vihiga Queens	2nd	Champion (2021)
(Rwanda) AS Kigali Women	2nd	Fourth place (2022)
(South Sudan) Yei Join Star FC	3rd	Group stage (2021 and 2022)
(Tanzania) JKT Queens	1st	N/A
(Uganda) Kampala Queen (Host)	1st	N/A
(Zanzibar) New Generation FC	2nd	Group stage (2022)

== Venues ==
Cities	Venues	Capacity
Kampala	Omondi-Stadium Lugogo	xx
Kampala	FUFA Technical Centre Njeru	

== Match officials ==
=== Referees ===
- (Burundi) Suavis Iratunga
- (Ethiopia) Sisay Raya
- (Kenya) Josphine Wanjiru
- (Kenya) Lucy Awino Juma
- (Rwanda) Aline Umutoni
- (Sudan) Khadmallah Angato Koko
- (Tanzania) Tatu Nuru Malogo

=== Assistant Referees ===
- (Burundi) Fides Bangurambona
- (Burundi) Alida Iradukunda
- (Ethiopia) Woinshet Kassaye
- (Kenya) Carolyne Kiles
- (Rwanda) Alice Umutesi
- (Rwanda) Sandrine Murangwa
- (South Sudan) Jane Charles Ladu Costantino
- (Sudan) Zahra Ali Haroun
- (Tanzania) Janet Balama
- (Tanzania) Glory John Tesha

== Draw ==
The draw for this edition of the tournament was held on 5 July 2023 at 11:00 UTC (13:00 CAT) in Egypt. The nine teams were drawn into 2 group of 4 and 5 teams with the teams finishing first and second in the groups qualifying for the knockout stages.

Group A	Group B
(South Sudan) Yei Join Star; (Ethiopia) CBE; (Uganda) Kampala Queens; (Djibouti) FAD Club; (Burundi) Buja Queens	(Kenya) Vihiga Queens; (Zanzibar) New Generation FC; (Tanzania) JKT Queens; (Rwanda) AS Kigali Women

== Group stage ==
Tiebreakers

Teams are ranked according to points (3 points for a win, 1 point for a draw, 0 points for a loss), and if tied on points, the following tiebreaking criteria are applied, in the order given, to determine the rankings.

1. Points in head-to-head matches among tied teams;
2. Goal difference in head-to-head matches among tied teams;
3. Goals scored in head-to-head matches among tied teams;
4. If more than two teams are tied, and after applying all head-to-head criteria above, a subset of teams are still tied, all head-to-head criteria above are reapplied exclusively to this subset of teams;
5. Goal difference in all group matches;
6. Goals scored in all group matches;
7. Penalty shoot-out if only two teams are tied and they met in the last round of the group;
8. Disciplinary points (yellow card = 1 point, red card as a result of two yellow cards = 3 points, direct red card = 3 points, yellow card followed by direct red card = 4 points);
9. Drawing of lots.

Time UTC +

=== Group A ===
Pos	Team	Pld	W	D	L	GF	GA	GD	Pts	Qualification
1	(Ethiopia) CBE	4	3	1	0	15	2	+13	10	Semi-finals
2	(Burundi) Buja Queens	4	3	0	1	6	4	+2	9	Semi-finals
3	(Uganda) Kampala Queens	4	2	1	1	11	4	+7	7	
4	(South Sudan) Yei Joint Stars	4	1	0	3	2	8	−6	3	
5	(Djibouti) FAD Club	4	0	0	4	2	18	−16	0	

12 August 2023
13:00 UTC+3

CBE FC (Ethiopia)	2–1	(Burundi) Buja Queens
Tadesse 62'; Abera 74'	Report	Situma 14'

FUFA Technical Centre Njeru, Kampala
Referee: Tatu Nuru Malogo (Tanzania)
12 August 2023
16:00 UTC+3

Yei Joint Stars FC (South Sudan)	0–3	(Uganda) Kampala Queens
	Report	Ikwaput 13', 39', 69'

FUFA Technical Centre Njeru, Kampala
Referee: Aline Umutoni (Rwanda)

15 August 2023
13:00 UTC+3

Kampala Queens (Uganda)	1–2	(Burundi) Buja Queens
Nakigozi 83'	Report	Situma 21', 54'

FUFA Technical Centre Njeru, Kampala
Referee: Josphine Wanjiru (Kenya)
15 August 2023
16:00 UTC+3

CBE FC (Ethiopia)	8–0	(Djibouti) FAD Club
Wakuma 83'; Tadesse 34'; Mekonnen 43'; Abera 44'; Bizuneh 52', 55'; Ojho 74', 90'	Report

FUFA Technical Centre Njeru, Kampala
Referee: Khadmallah Angato Koko (Sudan)

18 August 2023
13:00 UTC+3

Yei Joint Stars FC (South Sudan)	2–0	(Djibouti) FAD Club
Omar 13' (o.g.); Justine 89'	Report

FUFA Technical Centre Njeru, Kampala
Referee: Lucy Awino Juma (Kenya)
18 August 2023
16:00 UTC+3

CBE FC (Ethiopia)	1–1	(Uganda) Kampala Queens
Abera 2'	Report	Nandede 90+2'

FUFA Technical Centre Njeru, Kampala
Referee: Aline Umutoni (Rwanda)

21 August 2023
13:00 UTC+3

Yei Joint Stars FC (South Sudan)	0–1	(Burundi) Buja Queens
		Djafari 45+3'

FUFA Technical Centre Njeru, Kampala
21 August 2023
16:00 UTC+3

FAD Club (Djibouti)	1–6	(Uganda) Kampala Queens
Aden 53'	Report	Ikwaput 6', 15', 27', 73', 87'; Nakigozi 71'

FUFA Technical Centre Njeru, Kampala
Referee: Tatu Nuru Malogo (Tanzania)

24 August 2023
13:00 UTC+3

Yei Joint Stars FC (South Sudan)	0-4	(Ethiopia) CBE FC
	Report	Ariet Odong 29'; Loza Abera 45+4'; Senayt 61'; Mesay Temesgen Tanga 78'

FUFA Technical Centre Njeru, Kampala
24 August 2023
16:00 UTC+3

Buja Queens (Burundi)	2-1	(Djibouti) FAD Club
Ruth Ngosi 75'; Topister Situma 88'	Report	Nádia Nour 85'

FUFA Technical Centre Njeru, Kampala

=== Group B ===
Pos	Team	Pld	W	D	L	GF	GA	GD	Pts	Qualification
1	(Tanzania) JKT Queens	3	3	0	0	4	1	+3	9	Semi-finals
2	(Kenya) Vihiga Queens FC	3	2	0	1	4	2	+2	6	Semi-finals
3	(Rwanda) AS Kigali WFC	3	1	0	2	3	3	0	3	
4	(Zanzibar) New Generation FC	3	0	0	3	1	6	−5	0	

13 August 2023
13:00 UTC+3

Vihiga Queens FC (Kenya)	3–1	(Zanzibar) New Generation FC
Babirye 37'; Khasokha 58'; Emedot 81'	Report	Hemed 20'

Omondi Stadium-Lugogo, Kampala
13 August 2023
16:00 UTC+3

AS Kigali WFC (Rwanda)	1–2	(Tanzania) JKT Queens
Nyirandagijimana 3'	Report	Abdalla 46'; Minja 70'

Omondi Stadium-Lugogo, Kampala

16 August 2023
13:00 UTC+3

JKT Queens (Tanzania)	1–0	(Zanzibar) New Generation FC
Mabanza 56'	Report

Omondi Stadium-Lugogo, Kampala
Referee: Sisay Raya (Ethiopia)
16 August 2023
16:00 UTC+3

AS Kigali WFC (Rwanda)	0–1	(Kenya) Vihiga Queens FC
	Report	Omita 36'

Omondi Stadium-Lugogo, Kampala
Referee: Suavis Iratunga (Burundi)

19 August 2023
16:00 UTC+3

Vihiga Queens FC (Kenya)	0–1	(Tanzania) JKT Queens
	Report	Khasokha 48' (o.g.)

FUFA Technical Centre Njeru, Kampala
19 August 2023
16:00 UTC+3

AS Kigali WFC (Rwanda)	2–0	(Zanzibar) New Generation FC
Nibagwire 52'; Mukeshimana 72'	Report

Omondi Stadium-Lugogo, Kampala

== Knockout stage ==
=== Bracket ===
Semifinals
August 27–
(Tanzania) JKT Queens	3
(Burundi) Buja Queens	1
August 27–
(Ethiopia) CBE F.C.	2
(Kenya) Vihiga Queens FC	1

Final
August 30 –
(Tanzania) JKT Queens (p)	0(5)
(Ethiopia) CBE F.C.	0(4)
Third place
August 30 –
(Burundi) Buja Queens	1
(Kenya) Vihiga Queens FC	0

=== Semi-finals ===
27 August 2023
12:00 UTC+3

JKT Queens (Tanzania)	3–1	(Burundi) Buja Queens
Minja 63'; Stumai 77'; Gerald 90+4'	Report	Situma 11'

FUFA Technical Centre Njeru, Kampala

27 August 2023
15:00 UTC+3

CBE F.C. (Ethiopia)	2–1	(Kenya) Vihiga Queens FC
Abera 90+4'; Tadesse 90+5'	Report	Omita 53'

FUFA Technical Centre Njeru, Kampala

=== Third place match ===
30 August 2023
15:00 UTC+3

Buja Queens (Burundi)	1–0	(Kenya) Vihiga Queens FC
Lydia Akoth 40'	Report

FUFA Technical Centre Njeru, Kampala

=== Final ===
30 August 2023
12:00 UTC+3

JKT Queens (Tanzania)	0–0 (a.e.t.)	(Ethiopia) CBE F.C.
	Report
Penalties
Ester Mbanza Gindulya (penalty scored); Donisia Daniel Minja (penalty scored); Winifrida Gerald (penalty scored); Anastazia Antony Katunzi (penalty scored); Happyness Hezron Mwaipaja (penalty scored)	5–4	(penalty scored) Donisia Daniel Minja; (penalty scored) Winifrida Gerald; (penalty scored) Anastazia Antony Katunzi; (penalty scored) Happyness Hezron Mwaipaja; (penalty missed) Mesay Temesgen Bizuneh

FUFA Technical Centre Njeru, Kampala

== Statistics ==
=== Goalscorers ===
There have been 55 goals scored in 20 matches, for an average of 2.75 goals per match (as of 30 August 2023).

Rank	Player	Team	Goals
1	(Uganda) Fazila Ikwaput	(Uganda) Kampala Queens	8
2	(Ethiopia) Loza Abera	(Ethiopia) CBE FC	5
3	(Kenya) Topister Situma	(Burundi) Buja Queens	3
3	(Ethiopia) Ariet Odong Ojho	(Ethiopia) CBE FC	3
3	(Ethiopia) Aregash Tadesse	(Ethiopia) CBE FC	3
6	(Ethiopia) Birra Etsegenet Bizuneh	(Ethiopia) CBE FC	2
6	(Uganda) Elizabeth Nakigozi	(Uganda) Kampala Queens	2
6	(Burundi) Topister Situma	(Burundi) Buja Queens	2
6	(Tanzania) Donisia Daniel Minja	(Tanzania) JKT Queens	2
6	(Kenya) Bertha Omita	(Kenya) Vihiga Queens FC	2
12	(Ethiopia) Senaf Wakuma	(Ethiopia) CBE FC	1
12	(Ethiopia) Nardos Getenet Mekonomen	(Ethiopia) CBE FC	1
12	(Kenya) Winnie Babirye	(Kenya) Vihiga Queens FC	1
12	(Kenya) Ruth Khasokha	(Kenya) Vihiga Queens FC	1
12	(Kenya) Martha Amunyolet	(Kenya) Vihiga Queens FC	1
12	(Zanzibar) Amina Hemed	(Zanzibar) New Generation FC	1
12	(Rwanda) Diane Nyirandagijimana	(Rwanda) AS Kigali WFC	1
12	(Tanzania) Stumai Abdalla	(Tanzania) JKT Queens	1
12	(Tanzania) Esther Mabanza	(Tanzania) JKT Queens	1
12	(Tanzania) Abdallah Stumai	(Tanzania) JKT Queens	1
12	(Tanzania) Winifrida Gerald	(Tanzania) JKT Queens	1
12	(Uganda) Zainah Nandede	(Uganda) Kampala Queens	1
12	(South Sudan) Kilega Eunice Justine	(South Sudan) Yei Joint Stars FC	1
12	(Rwanda) Dorothee Mukeshimana	(Rwanda) AS Kigali WFC	1
12	(Rwanda) Libellee Nibagwire	(Rwanda) AS Kigali WFC	1
12	(Djibouti) Rahma Moustapha Aden	(Djibouti) FAD Club	1
12	(Djibouti) Nádia Nour	(Djibouti) FAD Club	1
12	(Ethiopia) Senayt	(Ethiopia) CBE FC	1
12	(Ethiopia) Mesay Temesgen Tanga	(Ethiopia) CBE FC	1
12	(Burundi) Ruth Ngosi	(Burundi) Buja Queens	1
12	(Burundi) Lydia Akoth	(Burundi) Buja Queens	1

- own goal

Rank	Player	Team	Goals
1	(Kenya) Ruth Khasokha	(Kenya) Vihiga Queens FC	1
1	(Djibouti) Soubane Ahmed Omar	(Djibouti) FAD Club	1
