= 2021 CAF Women's Champions League qualification =

Inaugural CAF WCL qualification campaign

Tournament details
- Host countries: Morocco (North Zone); Cape Verde (West A Zone); Ivory Coast (West B Zone); Equatorial Guinea (Central Zone); Kenya (Central-East Zone); South Africa (South Zone)
- Dates: 24 July – 25 August

Tournament statistics
- Matches played: 54
- Goals scored: 213 (3.94 per match)

Qualification for the 2021 CAF Women's Champions League began on 24 July 2021 within UNAF for North Africa and WAFU Zone A for West Africa and concluded on 4 September 2021 within COSAFA for Southern Africa.

Qualification was situated within the 6 CAF sub-confederations. At the end of qualification, the qualified teams were reduced to the final 8 who would then proceed to the group stages of this edition of the tournament, which took place across two stadiums in Cairo, Egypt from 5 to 19 November 2021. These teams were composed of one winning team from each of the qualification competitions of the CAF sub-confederations (WAFU is split into two zones), the host nation's league-winning team and, for this edition only, an additional team from the sub-confederation of the 2018 Women's Africa Cup of Nations champions.

== Teams ==
All participating teams qualified for their sub-regional qualification competitions via winning their respective national league titles and had their club licensing applications accepted by CAF. A total of 33 (out of 54) countries had at least one team which participated in this first qualification edition.

Qualified teams for the 2021 CAF Women's Champions League qualification phase
Zones		Teams			
UNAF		(Algeria) Afak Relizane (1st)	(Egypt) Wadi Degla^{HNT} (1st)	(Morocco) AS FAR (1st)	(Tunisia) AS Banque de l'Habitat (1st)
WAFU	A	(Cape Verde) Seven Stars (1st)	(Liberia) Determine Girls (1st)	(Mali) AS Mandé (1st)	(Senegal) Dakar Sacré-Cœur (1st)
WAFU	B	(Burkina Faso) US Forces Armées (1st)	(Ivory Coast) Onze Sœurs de Gagnoa (1st)	(Ghana) Hasaacas Ladies (1st)	(Niger) AS Police (1st)
WAFU	B	(Nigeria) Rivers Angels (1st)	(Togo) Amis du Monde (1st)		
UNIFFAC		(Cameroon) Louves Minproff (1st)	(Democratic Republic of the Congo) FCF Amani (1st)	(Equatorial Guinea) Malabo Kings (1st)	(Gabon) Missile FC (1st)
CECAFA		(Burundi) PVP Buyenzi (1st)	(Djibouti) FAD Club (1st)	(Ethiopia) CBE (1st)	(Kenya) Vihiga Queens (1st)
CECAFA		(South Sudan) Yei Join Star (1st)	(Tanzania) Simba Queens (1st)	(Uganda) Lady Doves (1st)	(Zanzibar) New Generation FC (1st)
COSAFA		(Botswana) Double Action Ladies (1st)	(Eswatini) Manzini Wonderers (1st)	(Lesotho) LDF LFC (1st)	(Namibia) Tura Magic Ladies FC (1st)
COSAFA		(South Africa) Mamelodi Sundowns (1st)	(Zambia) Green Buffaloes (1st)	(Zimbabwe) Black Rhinos Queens (1st)	

Associations which did not enter a team:

- Angola
- Benin
- Central African Republic
- Chad
- Comoros
- Congo
- Eritrea
- Gambia
- Guinea
- Guinea-Bissau
- Libya
- Madagascar
- Malawi
- Mauritania
- Mauritius
- Mozambique
- Rwanda
- São Tomé and Príncipe
- Seychelles
- Sierra Leone
- Somalia
- Sudan

== Qualification ==
Each CAF sub-confederation held a qualifying tournament, starting with UNAF for North Africa and WAFU Zone A for West Africa and ending with final for COSAFA's competition. The winners of these tournaments advanced to the group stages of the 2021 CAF Women's Champions League where they were joined by the host nation's league champions and another team from the sub-confederation of the 2018 Women's Africa Cup of Nations champions.

=== UNAF ===
The draw for this edition of qualification was held on 7 July 2021 with the competition itself running from 24 to 30 July in Berkane, Morocco and was won by the host nation's representative, AS FAR.

Pos	Team	Pld	W	D	L	GF	GA	GD	Pts	Qualification	FAR	AFR	ASB
1	(Morocco) AS FAR (H)	2	2	0	0	14	1	+13	6	Group stage	—	4–1	
2	(Algeria) Afak Relizane	2	1	0	1	4	5	−1	3			—	3–1
3	(Tunisia) AS Banque de l'Habitat	2	0	0	2	1	13	−12	0		0–10		—

(H) Hosts

=== WAFU Zone A ===
The tournament took place in Mindelo, Cape Verde from 24 to 30 July with AS Mandé emerging as its representative after defeating AS Dakar Sacré-Cœur in the final.

Pos	Team	Pld	W	D	L	GF	GA	GD	Pts	Qualification	ASM	ASD	DGF	SST
1	(Mali) AS Mandé	3	2	1	0	10	2	+8	7	Group stage	—	4–0	4–0	
2	(Senegal) AS Dakar Sacré-Cœur	3	2	0	1	4	6	−2	6			—		2–1
3	(Liberia) Determine Girls FC	3	1	0	2	3	6	−3	3			1–2	—	
4	(Cape Verde) Seven Stars (H)	3	0	1	2	3	6	−3	1		2–2		0–2	—

Source: Zone Oest/West A (Table uncompiled from source)
(H) Hosts

=== WAFU Zone B ===
The tournament took place in Marcory, Ivory Coast from 24 July to 5 August 2021 with Hasaacas Ladies emerging as its representavie after beating Rivers Angels 3–1 in the final.

==== Group stage ====
===== Group 1 =====
Pos	Team	Pld	W	D	L	GF	GA	GD	Pts	Qualification	USF	AAM	OSG
1	(Burkina Faso) US Forces Armées	2	2	0	0	3	1	+2	6	Semi-finals	—	2–1	
2	(Togo) Académie Amis du Monde FC	2	0	1	1	3	4	−1	1	Semi-finals		—	2–2
3	(Ivory Coast) Onze Sœurs de Gagnoa (H)	2	0	1	1	2	3	−1	1		0–1		—

(H) Hosts

===== Group 2 =====
Pos	Team	Pld	W	D	L	GF	GA	GD	Pts	Qualification	RIV	HAL	ASP
1	(Nigeria) Rivers Angels F.C.	2	2	0	0	7	0	+7	6	Semi-finals	—	2–0	
2	(Ghana) Hasaacas Ladies F.C.	2	1	0	1	3	2	+1	3	Semi-finals		—	3–0
3	(Niger) AS Police	2	0	0	2	0	8	−8	0		0–5		—

==== Knockout stage ====
===== Semi-finals =====
Team 1	Score	Team 2
US Forces Armées (Burkina Faso)	0–2	(Ghana) Hasaacas Ladies
Rivers Angels (Nigeria)	5–1	(Togo) Académie Amis du Monde FC

===== Third place match =====
Team 1	Score	Team 2
US Forces Armées (Burkina Faso)	0–2	(Togo) Académie Amis du Monde FC

===== Final =====
Team 1	Score	Team 2
Hasaacas Ladies (Ghana)	3–1	(Nigeria) Rivers Angels

=== UNIFFAC ===
The qualification tournament for UNIFFAC teams was held from 1 to 29 August 2021. with Malabo Kings emerged as the UNNIFAC representative after beating FCF Amani 5–1 in the final.

==== Semi-finals ====
Team 1	Agg.	Team 2	1st leg	2nd leg
Louves Minproff (Cameroon)	0–4	(Equatorial Guinea) Malabo Kings	0–3	0–1
FCF Amani (Democratic Republic of the Congo)	3–2	(Gabon) Missile FC	0–1	3–1

==== Final ====
Team 1	Agg.	Team 2	1st leg	2nd leg
Malabo Kings (Equatorial Guinea)	5–1	(Democratic Republic of the Congo) FCF Amani	4–1	1–0

=== CECAFA ===
The draw for the qualification tournament for CECAFA teams (branded as the CECAFA Women's Champions League) was held on 8 July 2021 with the competition itself running from 28 August to 9 September in Nairobi, Kenya. The host nation's team, Vihiga Queens emerged as the CECAFA representavie after beating Commercial Bank of Ethiopia (CBE) FC 2–1 in the final.

==== Group stage ====
===== Group A =====
Pos	Team	Pld	W	D	L	GF	GA	GD	Pts	Qualification	SIM	LDW	PVP	FAD
1	(Tanzania) Simba Queens	3	2	1	0	14	1	+13	7	Knockout stage	—			10–0
2	(Uganda) Lady Doves WFC	3	2	1	0	8	0	+8	7	Knockout stage	0–0	—	3–0	5–0
3	(Burundi) PVP Buyenzi	3	1	0	2	3	8	−5	3		1–4		—	2–1
4	(Djibouti) FAD Club	3	0	0	3	1	17	−16	0					—

===== Group B =====
Pos	Team	Pld	W	D	L	GF	GA	GD	Pts	Qualification	CBE	VIQ	YJS	NGE
1	(Ethiopia) CBE FC	3	3	0	0	24	3	+21	9	Knockout stage	—	4–2	10–0	10–1
2	(Kenya) Vihiga Queens (H)	3	2	0	1	21	4	+17	6	Knockout stage		—		
3	(South Sudan) Yei Join Stars FC	3	1	0	2	2	22	−20	3			0–11	—	2–1
4	(Zanzibar) New Generation FC	3	0	0	3	2	20	−18	0			0–8		—

(H) Hosts

==== Knockout stage ====
===== Semi-finals =====
Team 1	Score	Team 2
Simba Queens (Tanzania)	1–2	(Kenya) Vihiga Queens
CBE FC (Ethiopia)	1–1 (5–3 p)	(Uganda) Lady Doves WFC

===== Final =====
Team 1	Score	Team 2
Vihiga Queens (Kenya)	2–1	(Ethiopia) CBE FC

=== COSAFA ===
COSAFA organized a qualification tournament for its countries known as the COSAFA Women's Champions League to qualify its winners there, which was held on 29 July 2021 with the competition itself taking place at the Sugar Ray Xulu Stadium in Durban, South Africa from 26 to 31 August 2021. Eight teams were drawn into two groups of four with the top two in each group advancing to the knock-out phase (semi-finals). Mamelodi Sundowns Ladies emerged as the COSAFA representative after beating Black Rhinos Queens 3–0 in the final.

==== Group stage ====
===== Group A =====
Pos	Team	Pld	W	D	L	GF	GA	GD	Pts	Qualification	MSL	DAL	MW	LDF
1	(South Africa) Mamelodi Sundowns Ladies (H)	3	3	0	0	18	1	+17	9	Knockout phase	—	6–0	6–1	6–0
2	(Botswana) Double Action Ladies	3	2	0	1	9	6	+3	6	Knockout phase		—	3–0	
3	(Eswatini) Manzini Wanderers LFC	3	0	1	2	2	10	−8	1				—	
4	Lesotho Defense Force	3	0	1	2	1	13	−12	1			0–6	1–1	—

Source: Match Line-up sourcing
(H) Hosts

===== Group B =====
Pos	Team	Pld	W	D	L	GF	GA	GD	Pts	Qualification	BRQ	GBL	TML
1	(Zimbabwe) Black Rhinos Queens FC	2	2	0	0	5	0	+5	6	Knockout phase	—		
2	(Zambia) Green Buffaloes	2	1	0	1	1	2	−1	3	Knockout phase	0–2	—	1–0
3	(Namibia) Tura Magic Ladies FC	2	0	0	2	0	4	−4	0		0–3		—

Source: Match Line-up sourcing

==== Knockout stage ====
===== Semi-finals =====
Team 1	Score	Team 2
Black Rhinos Queens (Zimbabwe)	2–0	(Botswana) Double Action Ladies
Mamelodi Sundowns Ladies (South Africa)	1–0	(Zambia) Green Buffaloes

===== Final =====
Team 1	Score	Team 2
Black Rhinos Queens (Zimbabwe)	0–3	(South Africa) Mamelodi Sundowns Ladies
