= Esse Akida =

Kenyan footballer (born 1992)

Personal information
- Full name: Esse Mbeyu Akida
- Date of birth: 18 November 1992 (age 33)
- Place of birth: Kilifi, Kenya
- Position: Forward

Team information
- Current team: Kibera Soccer

Youth career
- MTG

College career
Years	Team	Apps	(Gls)
2013–2015	KeMU Queens		

Senior career*
Years	Team	Apps	(Gls)
- MTG United
2012	Matuu	22	(30)
2014–2017	Spedag		
2018	Thika Queens		
2018–2019	Ramat HaSharon	22	(4)
2019–2020	Beşiktaş J.K.	2	(0)
2021–2024	PAOK	64	(38)
2025–	Kibera Soccer	9	(2)

International career
2012–	Kenya	6	(2)
- * Club domestic league appearances and goals

Esse Mbeyu Akida (born 18 November 1992) is a professional Kenyan footballer, who currently plays for Kibera Soccer in the Kenyan Premier League and is a member of the ”Harambee Starlets", the Kenya National Football Team.

== Club career ==
Akida joined Moving The Goalposts (MTG) in 2002

She was awarded top scorer for the 2016 COTIF Women Football Tournament in Valencia, Spain.

In October 2018, Akida transferred to Israeli Ligat Nashim club FC Ramat HaSharon.

In February 2020, Esse Akida joined Beşiktaş J.K. in Turkey for an undisclosed fee. After appearing in two matches of the 2019-20 Turkish Women's First Football League season's second half, which discontinued due to COVID-19 pandemic in Turkey, she left Turkey on 23 February 2021 to return to her country. She currently plays for PAOK.

== International career ==
She played for Kenya at the 2016 Africa Women Cup of Nations, scoring for Kenya in the match against Ghana.

She scored for Kenya in a 2018 Africa Women Cup of Nations qualification match against Equatorial Guinea.

Currently also playing for the Kenya National Football team; "Harambee Starlets".

== See also ==
- List of Kenya women's international footballers
