= Vivian Akinyi =

Kenyan footballer (born 1994)

Personal information
- Full name: Vivian Akinyi Komullo
- Date of birth: 20 May 1994 (age 32)
- Place of birth: Migori County, Kenya
- Position: Goalkeeper

Youth career
- True Colours FC

Senior career*
Years	Team	Apps	(Gls)
- Mathare United
- Kenya Sports Journalists
- Makolanders
- Soccer Queens
2018–	Gaspo		

International career
- Kenya
- * Club domestic league appearances and goals

Vivian Akinyi Komullo (born 20 May 1994) is a Kenyan footballer who plays as a goalkeeper. She has been a member of the Kenya women's national team.

== Early years ==
Akinyi was born on 20 May 1994 in Migori County, Kenya, to George Owuor Komullo and Hellen Aoko Komullo. She has an identical twin sister, Sharon Aluoch. The two grew up in the Mathare slums of Nairobi, where they began playing football after their older brother introduced them to the sport. The twins attended Valley View Academy, a private school, where they honed their skills as midfielders on the school's team. However, Akinyi eventually switched to goalkeeper because "the coach would always pick Sharon ahead of [her]".

The twins attended Sega Girls High School on a football scholarship before transferring to Maina Wanjigi High School. They also played for True Colours FC in the Mathare Youth Sports Association.

== Club career ==
At the age of 14, Akinyi and her sister featured for Mathare United in the Kenyan Women's Premier League (KWPL). They continued playing for the club until the women's side was discontinued in 2012.

Akinyi signed with Gaspo ahead of the 2018 KWPL season. She served as the team captain before she was named the manager in late 2022.

== International career ==
Akinyi earned her first call-up to the Kenya women's national team in 2014. She played for Kenya at the 2016 Africa Women Cup of Nations.

== See also ==
- List of Kenya women's international footballers
