= 2021 CAF Women's Champions League =

Inaugural CAF Women's Champions League edition

- The logo of the final tournament

Tournament details
- Host country: Egypt
- City: Cairo
- Dates: Qualifying: 24 July – 25 August 2021; Main tournament: 5 – 19 November
- Teams: Main tournament: 8 Total: 33 (from 33 associations)
- Venue: 2 (in 1 host city)

Final positions
- Champions: (South Africa) Mamelodi Sundowns (1st title)
- Runners-up: (Ghana) Hasaacas Ladies
- Third place: (Morocco) AS FAR
- Fourth place: (Equatorial Guinea) Malabo Kings

Tournament statistics
- Matches played: 16
- Goals scored: 40 (2.5 per match)
- Top scorer: (Ghana) Evelyn Badu (5)
- Best player: (Ghana) Evelyn Badu
- Best goalkeeper: (South Africa) Andile Dlamini

The 2021 CAF Women's Champions League, known as the 2021 TotalEnergies CAF Women's Champions League for sponsorship purposes, was the inaugural edition of the annual African women's association football club tournament organized by CAF. It was held in Cairo, Egypt from 5 to 19 November 2021.

== Qualified teams ==
Location of teams of the 2021 CAF Women's Champions League group stage.
Group A
Group B

The qualification phases were made up of 6 sub-confederation qualification tournaments which began with those of UNAF for North Africa and West Africa's Zone A on 24 July 2021 and concluded on 8 September 2021. Qualification ended with the participating teams reduced to the final 8 which were made up of one winning team each from the 6 CAF sub-confederations (WAFU is split into two zones), the host nation's league-winning team and, for this edition only, an additional team from the sub-confederation of the incumbent Women's Africa Cup of Nations champions.

Association	Team	Qualifying method	Appearance
Egypt	Wadi Degla (hosts)	2021 Egyptian League champions	1st
Morocco	AS FAR	UNAF qualification tournament	1st
Mali	AS Mandé	WAFU A qualification tournament	1st
Ghana	Hasaacas Ladies	WAFU B qualification tournament	1st
Nigeria	Rivers Angels	WAFU B qualification tournament	1st
Equatorial Guinea	Malabo Kings	UNIFFAC qualification tournament	1st
Kenya	Vihiga Queens	CECAFA qualification tournament	1st
South Africa	Mamelodi Sundowns	COSAFA qualification tournament	1st

== Draw ==
The draw for this edition of the tournament was held at the CAF headquarters in Cairo, Egypt on 29 September 2021 at 17:00 CAT (15:00 UTC). The eight confirmed teams were put into two groups of four teams. As club competition hosts, Wadi Degla was allocated to position A1.

== Venues ==
This edition of the tournament was held in two venues in Cairo; the 30 June Stadium and the Al Salam Stadium.

2021 CAF Women's Champions League is located in Egypt	Cairo	
2021 CAF Women's Champions League is located in Egypt	30 June Stadium	Al Salam Stadium
2021 CAF Women's Champions League is located in Egypt	Capacity: 30,000	Capacity: 28,500

== Match officials ==
The following sets of referees were chosen for the tournament;

=== Referees ===
- (Burundi) Suavis Iratunga
- (Egypt) Shahenda El Maghrabi
- (Eswatini) Letticia Vianna
- (Ethiopia) Lidya Tafesse Abebe
- (Mauritania) Aïssata Amadou Lam
- (Mauritius) Maria Packuita Cyquela Rivet
- (Morocco) Bouchra Karboubi
- (Nigeria) Patience Madu Ndidi
- (Rwanda) Salima Mukansanga
- (South Africa) Akona Zenith Makhalima
- (Togo) Vincentia Enyonam Amedume
- (Tunisia) Dorsaf Ganouati

=== Assistant referees ===
- (Cameroon) Carine Atezambong Fomo
- (Egypt) Yara Atef Said Abdelfattah
- (Egypt) Mona Mahmoud Atallah Mostafa
- (Kenya) Mary Njoroge
- (Madagascar) Pélagie Lidwine Rakotozafinoro
- (Malawi) Bernadettar Kwimbira
- (Mali) Fanta Idrissa Koné
- (Mauritius) Victoire Queency
- (Morocco) Soukaina Hamdi
- (Morocco) Fatiha Jermoumi
- (Nigeria) Mimisen Agatha Iyorhe
- (Senegal) Adia Isseu Cissé
- (Tunisia) Houda Affine
- (Zambia) Diana Chikotescha

== Group stage ==
The group stage kick-off times were in Central Africa Time (CAT) (UTC+02:00). Owing to the COVID-19 pandemic and its associated travel restrictions, the matches were played behind closed doors.

=== Group A ===
Pos	Team	Pld	W	D	L	GF	GA	GD	Pts	Qualification
1	(Ghana) Hasaacas Ladies	3	2	1	0	8	3	+5	7	Advance to Semi-finals
2	(Equatorial Guinea) Malabo Kings	3	1	1	1	5	4	+1	4	Advance to Semi-finals
3	(Egypt) Wadi Degla (H)	3	1	1	1	5	6	−1	4	
4	(Mali) AS Mandé	3	0	1	2	2	7	−5	1	

Source: Soccerway
(H) Hosts
5 November 2021
16:00

Wadi Degla (Egypt)	3–1	(Mali) AS Mandé
El Solh 3' (pen.); Dukureh 9'; Ayala 49'	Report	Traoré 32'

30 June Stadium, Cairo
Attendance: 0
Referee: Akhona Makhalima (South Africa)
5 November 2021
19:00

Malabo Kings (Equatorial Guinea)	1–3	(Ghana) Hasaacas Ladies
Gbogou 90'	Report	Badu 11', 90+2'; Agyekum 85'

30 June Stadium, Cairo
Attendance: 0
Referee: Bouchra Karboubi (Morocco)

8 November 2021
16:00

Wadi Degla (Egypt)	0–3	(Equatorial Guinea) Malabo Kings
	Report	Gbogou 14' (pen.), 41'; Balongo 58'

30 June Stadium, Cairo
Attendance: 0
Referee: Leticia Viana (Eswatini)
8 November 2021
19:00

Hasaacas Ladies (Ghana)	3–0	(Mali) AS Mandé
Badu 17', 59'; Agyekum 45+3'	Report

30 June Stadium, Cairo
Attendance: 0
Referee: Suavis Iratunga (Burundi)

11 November 2021
16:00

Hasaacas Ladies (Ghana)	2–2	(Egypt) Wadi Degla
Nyame 21'; Appiah 49'	Report	Ayala 9'; El Solh 26'

30 June Stadium, Cairo
Attendance: 0
Referee: Vincentia Amedome (Togo)
11 November 2021
16:00

AS Mandé (Mali)	1–1	(Equatorial Guinea) Malabo Kings
Touré 2'	Report	Mendoua 80'

Al Salam Stadium, Cairo
Attendance: 0
Referee: Patience Madu (Nigeria)

=== Group B ===
Pos	Team	Pld	W	D	L	GF	GA	GD	Pts	Qualification
1	(South Africa) Mamelodi Sundowns	3	2	1	0	2	0	+2	7	Advance to Semi-finals
2	(Morocco) AS FAR	3	1	1	1	3	2	+1	4	Advance to Semi-finals
3	(Nigeria) Rivers Angels	3	1	0	2	4	4	0	3	
4	(Kenya) Vihiga Queens	3	1	0	2	2	5	−3	3	

Source: Soccerway
6 November 2021
16:00

Vihiga Queens (Kenya)	0–1	(South Africa) Mamelodi Sundowns
	Report	Kgadiete 4'

Al Salam Stadium, Cairo
Attendance: 0
Referee: Shahenda El Maghrabi (Egypt)
6 November 2021
19:00

AS FAR (Morocco)	3–0	(Nigeria) Rivers Angels
Mssoudy 30', 73', 84'	Report

Al Salam Stadium, Cairo
Attendance: 0
Referee: Lidya Tafesse (Ethiopia)

9 November 2021
16:00

Vihiga Queens (Kenya)	2–0	(Morocco) AS FAR
Wanyonyi 9'; Shikangwa 52'	Report

Al Salam Stadium, Cairo
Attendance: 0
Referee: Aissata Amadou Lam (Mauritania)
9 November 2021
19:00

Rivers Angels (Nigeria)	0–1	(South Africa) Mamelodi Sundowns
	Report	Nhlapho 17'

Al Salam Stadium, Cairo
Attendance: 0
Referee: Salima Mukansanga (Rwanda)

12 November 2021
16:00

Rivers Angels (Nigeria)	4–0	(Kenya) Vihiga Queens
Ikechukwu 67' (pen.), 77' (pen.); Koku 80'; Monday 84'	Report

30 June Stadium, Cairo
Attendance: 0
Referee: Dorsaf Ganouati (Tunisisa)
12 November 2021
16:00

Mamelodi Sundowns (South Africa)	0–0	(Morocco) AS FAR
	Report

Al Salam Stadium, Cairo
Attendance: 0
Referee: Maria Packuita Cynquela Rivet (Mauritius)

== Knock-out phase ==
=== Bracket ===
Semi-finals
15 November – Cairo
(Ghana) Hasaacas Ladies	2
(Morocco) AS FAR	1
15 November – Cairo
(South Africa) Mamelodi Sundowns (p)	0 (5)
(Equatorial Guinea) Malabo Kings	0 (4)

Final
19 November – Cairo
(Ghana) Hasaacas Ladies	0
(South Africa) Mamelodi Sundowns	2
Third place
18 November – Cairo
(Morocco) AS FAR	3
(Equatorial Guinea) Malabo Kings	1

=== Semi-finals ===
15 November 2021
17:00

Hasaacas Ladies (Ghana)	2–1	(Morocco) AS FAR
Boaduwaa 36'; Badu 76'	Report	Badri 45'

Al Salam Stadium, Cairo
Attendance: 0
Referee: Salima Mukansanga (Rwanda)

15 November 2021
20:00

Mamelodi Sundowns (South Africa)	0–0 (a.e.t.)	(Equatorial Guinea) Malabo Kings
	Report
Penalties
Nhlapho (penalty scored); Mbane (penalty scored); Kgasago (penalty scored); Mthandi (penalty scored); Esau (penalty missed); Thusi (penalty scored)	5–4	(penalty scored) Bella; (penalty scored) Bokoka; (penalty missed) Nke; (penalty scored) Muriel Linda; (penalty scored) Baita; (penalty missed) Fanta

Al Salam Stadium, Cairo
Attendance: 0
Referee: Bouchra Karboubi (Morocco)

=== Third-place match ===
18 November 2021
19:00

AS FAR (Morocco)	3–1	(Equatorial Guinea) Malabo Kings
Tagnaout 10'; Chebbak 61', 90+2'	Report	Carol Carioca 50'

30 June Stadium, Cairo
Attendance: 0
Referee: Vincentia Enyonam Amedume (Togo)

=== Final ===
19 November 2021
19:00 UTC+2

Hasaacas Ladies (Ghana)	0–2	(South Africa) Mamelodi Sundowns
	Report	Morifi 33'; Mgcoyi 65'

30 June Stadium, Cairo
Attendance: 0
Referee: Lidya Tafesse (Ethiopia)

== Statistics ==
=== Top scorers ===
Below is the list of the top 10 scorers in the main phase of this edition of the tournament:

Rank	Player	Team	Goals
1	(Ghana) Evelyn Badu	(Ghana) Hasaacas Ladies	5
2	(Ivory Coast) Stéphanie Gbogou	(Equatorial Guinea) Malabo Kings	3
2	(Morocco) Sanaâ Mssoudy	(Morocco) AS FAR	3
4	(Egypt) Noha El Solh	(Egypt) Wadi Degla	2
4	(The Gambia) Fatumata Dukureh	(Egypt) Wadi Degla	2
4	(Guatemala) Jasmin Zachwieja	(Egypt) Wadi Degla	2
4	(Ghana) Perpetual Agyekum	(Ghana) Hasaacas Ladies	2
4	(Morocco) Ghizlane Chebbak	(Morocco) AS FAR	2
4	(Nigeria) Vivian Ikechukwu	(Nigeria) Rivers Angels	2
10	(Brazil) Carol Carioca	(Equatorial Guinea) Malabo Kings	1
10	(Cameroon) Muriel Lynda Mendoua	(Equatorial Guinea) Malabo Kings	1
10	(Democratic Republic of the Congo) Grâce Balongo	(Equatorial Guinea) Malabo Kings	1
10	(Ghana) Doris Boaduwaa	(Ghana) Hasaacas Ladies	1
10	(Ghana) Faustina Nyame	(Ghana) Hasaacas Ladies	1
10	(Ghana) Veronica Appiah	(Ghana) Hasaacas Ladies	1
10	(Kenya) Jentrix Shikangwa	(Kenya) Vihiga Queens	1
10	(Kenya) Violet Wanyonyi	(Kenya) Vihiga Queens	1
10	(Mali) Awa Traoré	(Mali) Mandé	1
10	(Mali) Bassira Touré	(Mali) Mandé	1
10	(Morocco) Najat Badri	(Morocco) AS FAR	1
10	(Morocco) Fatima Tagnaout	(Morocco) AS FAR	1
10	(Nigeria) Oluwadamilola Iyabo Koku	(Nigeria) Rivers Angels	1
10	(Nigeria) Gift Monday	(Nigeria) Rivers Angels	1
10	(South Africa) Melinda Kgadiete	(South Africa) Mamelodi Sundowns	1
10	(South Africa) Andisiwe Mgcoyi	(South Africa) Mamelodi Sundowns	1
10	(South Africa) Chuene Morifi	(South Africa) Mamelodi Sundowns	1
10	(South Africa) Zanele Nhlapho	(South Africa) Mamelodi Sundowns	1

=== Squad of the group stage ===
The CAF Women's Champions League technical study group selected the following 11 players as the squad of the group stage:

==== Best XI ====
Pos.	Player	Team
GK	(South Africa) Asa Rabalao	(South Africa) Mamelodi Sundowns
DF	(South Africa) Bambanani Mbane	(South Africa) Mamelodi Sundowns
DF	(Ghana) Janet Egyir	(Ghana) Hasaacas Ladies
DF	(South Africa) Zanele Nhlapho	(South Africa) Mamelodi Sundowns
DF	(Ghana) Perpetual Agyekum	(Ghana) Hasaacas Ladies
MF	(Democratic Republic of the Congo) Grâce Mfwamba	(Equatorial Guinea) Malabo Kings
MF	(Ghana) Evelyn Badu	(Ghana) Hasaacas Ladies
MF	(Morocco) Ghizlane Chhiri	(Morocco) AS FAR
FW	(Morocco) Fatima Tagnaout	(Morocco) AS FAR
FW	(Morocco) Sanaâ Mssoudy	(Morocco) AS FAR
FW	(Guatemala) Jasmín Zachwieja	(Egypt) Wadi Degla

==== Awards of the group stage ====
The CAF Women's Champions League technical study group selected the following as the best of the group stage:

Award	Player/Coach	Team
Best Player	(Ghana) Evelyn Badu	(Ghana) Hasaacas Ladies
Best Goalkeeper	(South Africa) Andile Dlamini	(South Africa) Mamelodi Sundowns
Best Coach	(Ghana) Yusif Basigi	(Ghana) Hasaacas Ladies

=== Squad of the tournament ===
The CAF Women's Champions League technical study group selected the following 11 players as the squad of this edition of the tournament.

==== Best XI ====
Pos.	Player	Team
GK	(South Africa) Andile Dlamini	(South Africa) Mamelodi Sundowns
DF	(South Africa) Bambanani Mbane	(South Africa) Mamelodi Sundowns
DF	(Ghana) Janet Egyir	(Ghana) Hasaacas Ladies
DF	(South Africa) Zanele Nhlapho	(South Africa) Mamelodi Sundowns
DF	(Ghana) Perpetual Agyekum	(Ghana) Hasaacas Ladies
MF	(Morocco) Fatima Dahmos	(Morocco) AS FAR
MF	(Ghana) Evelyn Badu	(Ghana) Hasaacas Ladies
MF	(Morocco) Ghizlane Chhiri	(Morocco) AS FAR
FW	(Morocco) Fatima Tagnaout	(Morocco) AS FAR
FW	(Morocco) Sanaâ Mssoudy	(Morocco) AS FAR
FW	(Ghana) Doris Boaduwaa	(Ghana) Hasaacas Ladies

==== Awards of the tournament ====
The CAF Women's Champions League technical study group selected the following as the best of the tournament.

Award	Player	Team
Best Player	(Ghana) Evelyn Badu	(Ghana) Hasaacas Ladies
Top Goal scorer	(Ghana) Evelyn Badu	(Ghana) Hasaacas Ladies
Best Goalkeeper	(South Africa) Andile Dlamini	(South Africa) Mamelodi Sundowns

== Final standings ==
Per statistical convention in football, matches decided in extra time are counted as wins and losses, while matches decided by a penalty shoot-out are counted as draws.

Pos.	Team	Pld	W	D	L	Pts	GF	GA	GD
1	(South Africa) Mamelodi Sundowns	5	3	2	0	11	4	0	+4
2	(Ghana) Hasaacas Ladies	5	3	1	1	10	10	6	+4
3	(Morocco) AS FAR	5	2	1	2	7	7	5	+2
4	(Equatorial Guinea) Malabo Kings	5	1	2	2	5	6	7	−1
Eliminated in group stage
5	(Egypt) Wadi Degla	3	1	1	1	4	5	6	−1
6	(Nigeria) Rivers Angels	3	1	0	2	3	4	4	0
7	(Kenya) Vihiga Queens	3	1	0	2	3	2	5	−3
8	(Mali) AS Mandé	3	0	1	2	1	2	7	−5
