= Varsénia da Luz =

Cape Verdean footballer (born 1992)

Personal information
- Full name: Varsénia Lina Monteiro da Luz
- Date of birth: 19 March 1992 (age 34)
- Place of birth: São Vicente, Cape Verde
- Position: Defender

Team information
- Current team: Seven Stars
- Number: 5

Senior career*
Years	Team	Apps	(Gls)
- Ribeirense FC
–2013	Cruzeiros do Norte		
2013–2018	Mindelense		
2018–	Seven Stars		

International career^{‡}
2018–	Cape Verde	22	(3)
- * Club domestic league appearances and goals ‡ National team caps and goals as of 24 October 2025

Varsénia Lina Monteiro da Luz (Portuguese: [vɐɾ.ˈsɛ.ni.ɐ ˈli.nɐ mõ.ˈtej.ɾu dɐ luʃ], born 19 March 1992), often shortened to Varsénia is a Cape Verdean footballer who plays as a right-back for Campeonato Nacional Feminino Caboverdiano club Seven Stars and captains the Cape Verde national football team.

== Club career ==
Born in São Vicente, like most children, da Luz started playing football with friends in the neighborhood. She then joined Ribeirense FC in the regional championship. After one season, she joined Cruzeiros do Norte before moving to Mindelense, where she won four regional titles and participated in national championships between 2013 and 2018.

On 23 August 2014, Varsénia was part of the historic inaugural match at the Estádio Nacional, where a women's match between the Barlavento and Sotavento selections marked the stadium's first official game. The match ended in a 0–0 draw.

In 2018, she joined Seven Stars in Praia, where she won four consecutive Santiago Sul regional titles, two national championships, and five Taça Praia trophies. She also competed with the club in the inaugural 2021 CAF Women's Champions League WAFU Zone A Qualifiers, held in Cape Verde.

In addition to football, she has competed in futsal. In 2023, she represented São Vicente in the Inter-Island Futsal Tournament, where her team won the title.

== International career ==
As one of the pioneers of women's football in Cape Verde, Varsénia was part of the country's first-ever women's national team. She made her debut in a 1–0 home defeat to Guinea-Bissau on 16 November 2018. Since then, she has been a regular in the national squad, featuring in every Cape Verde selection, including the 2020 and 2023 WAFU Zone A Women's Cup. On 27 January 2023, she scored her first international goal in a 2–1 semi-final victory over Gambia.

== Career statistics ==
=== International ===
As of match played 24 October 2025

Appearances and goals by national team and year
National team	Year	Apps	Goals
Cape Verde	2018	1	0
Cape Verde	2019	1	0
Cape Verde	2020	5	0
Cape Verde	2021	2	0
Cape Verde	2022	1	0
Cape Verde	2023	8	1
Cape Verde	2025	4	2
Total		22	3

Scores and results list Cape Verde's goal tally first, score column indicates score after each da Luz goal.

List of international goals scored by Varsénia da Luz
No.	Date	Venue	Opponent	Score	Result	Competition
1	27 January 2023	Estádio Marcelo Leitão, Sal, Cape Verde	Gambia	1–0	2–1	2023 WAFU Zone A Women's Cup
2	21 February 2025	Stade Lat-Dior, Thiès, Senegal	Guinea	2–0	2–2	2026 WAFCON qualifiers
3	26 February 2025	Estádio Nacional de Cabo Verde, Praia, Cape Verde	Guinea	4–1	4–1	2026 WAFCON qualifiers
