= Beldine Odemba =

Kenyan footballer

Beldine Odemba is a Kenyan football coach and former player who is currently the head coach of the Kenya women's national team and the Kenya under-20 women's national team. She is also the coach of Kenyan Women's Premier League (KWPL) club Kenya Police Bullets, and school team Highway Academy.
