= Rosemary Aluoch =

Kenyan footballer (1976–2020)

Personal information
- Date of birth: 7 May 1976
- Place of birth: Dandora, Kenya
- Date of death: 4 October 2020 (aged 44)
- Place of death: Kasarani, Kenya
- Position: Goalkeeper

Senior career*
Years	Team	Apps	(Gls)
1993–1995	Makongeni Youth FC		
1996	Eastlanders FC		
1997	Chipeta Ladies		
1998–2001	Minicus FC		
2002	Old is Gold FC		
2003	Kampala Capital City Authority FC		
2004–2005	OC Bukavu Dawa		
2006–2007	Lakolombe FC		
2008–2010	Old is Gold FC		
2011–2012	MOYAS FC		
2013	Bukabu Dawa		

International career
1995–2014	Kenya	8	(0)
- * Club domestic league appearances and goals

Rosemary Aluoch (5 July 1976 – 4 October 2020) was a Kenyan footballer who played goalkeeper.

== Biography ==
Aluoch played for the Kenyan women's team from 1995 to 2014. She also played for numerous football clubs in Kenya, the Democratic Republic of the Congo, Uganda, and Burundi. She joined the staff of the Kenyan women's team in 2015, serving as a goalkeepers' coach.

Rosemary Aluoch died in Kasarani on 4 October 2020 at the age of 44.

== See also ==
- List of Kenya women's international footballers
