= Danielita Favour Nambatya =

Ugandan footballer

Personal information
- Date of birth: 14 November 2000 (age 25)
- Place of birth: Mulago, Kampala
- Position: Striker

Team information
- Current team: Apaer WFC
- Number: 10

Youth career
- All Stars Sports Academy
- Old Mulago Primary School
- Masaka SS
- ST Marys Kitende
- 2015: Kawempe Muslim ss

Senior career*
Years	Team	Apps	(Gls)
2015–2018	Kawempe Muslim LFC		(27)
2018–2020	Muteesa I Royal University		(10)
2020–2023	She Corporate FC		(28)
2023–2024	Apear WFC		(8)

International career
2012–	Uganda		
- * Club domestic league appearances and goals

Danielita Favour Nambatya (born 14 November 2000) is a Ugandan women footballer, who plays as a Forward for Rwanda Women's Football League club Apaer women's Football Club and the Uganda women's national team.

== Early life ==
Born in Mulago Hospital, Kampala to Peruth Onuonga and retired footballer Mathias Ssonko. Her sister Precious Najjemba is a footballer too once at Mutesa I Royal University in a family of 6.

Nambatya started playing football at age seven while in primary three at By Pass Standard Academy in Kyebando and later at Old Mulago Primary school. In the early days trained with All Stars Sports Academy under coach Muyitale to being spotted by Old Mulago Primary School for Primary level. Nambatya is a former player at Masaka Secondary School formerly Agha Khan which she attended until senior three with coach Jimmy Kisekka, later joined ST Mary's Kitende for Senior Four and Kawempe Muslim SS for the Advanced level with coach Moses Nkata and Ayub Khalifa, Makerere University Business School and Muteesa I Royal University.

== Club career ==
=== Kawempe Muslim WFC ===
Nambatya joined Kawempe Muslim LFC from Kawempe Muslim SS when promoted to play in the FUFA Women Elite League which was the top League of Uganda women football at a time. Nambatya played at Kawempe for three seasons since 2015 until the end of 2018 scoring 27 league goals in the period. During the first season 2015 scored 6 league goals, 8 in 2015/16 and 13 in 2016/17.

=== Muteesa I Royal University WFC. ===
From Kawempe, Nambatya joined Muteesa I Royal University for Bachelors in tourism and Hotel Management, and ended up playing there for a year and a half featuring in the FUFA Women Elite League through 2018 - 2019 season.

=== Makerere University Business School (MUBS) ===
Nambatya left Muteesa in 2019 to join MUBS for a Bachelors of Science in marketing.

=== She Corporate FC ===
Nambatya joined She Corporate in 2020 and was part of the squad that won FUFA Women Super League trophy in 2021–22 season. Favour was runner up goal scorer of the league with 10 goals as Fazila Ikwaput and Hasifah Nassuuna shared the boot. In 2022/23 season with She Corporate, Nambatya scored six goals in the CAF Women Champions League (CECAFA Zone Qualifiers).

=== Apear Women FC ===
On 25 January 2023, Nambatya signed a short-term contract with Apear Women Fc of Rwanda playing in Rwanda Women's Football League and was given shirt 14 the exact number she was putting on at She Corporate. Favour scored two goals on debut as Apear won 3-2 Rayon Sport Football Club in the outing.

== International career ==
In 2012, received first team call up to represent Uganda Women's National Team. And has received over five national teams call ups. Nambatya was among the CAF U-20 women qualifiers pool players summoned by Uganda in 2017 that won 22–0 against South Sudan despite missing out the next stage due to finance.

== Honours ==
- FUFA Women Elite league [2015, 2015/16, 2016/17]
- Independence Cup [2014, 2015, 2016]
- FUFA Women Super League [2021/22]

== See also ==
- Kawempe Muslim LFC
