= 2021 CAF Women's Champions League CECAFA Qualifiers =

Tournament details
- Host country: Kenya
- Dates: 28 Aug–9 Sep
- Teams: 9 (from 13 associations)

Final positions
- Champions: (Kenya) Vihiga Queens (1st title)
- Runners-up: (Ethiopia) CBE F.C.
- Third place: (Uganda) Lady Doves WFC
- Fourth place: (Tanzania) Simba Queens

Tournament statistics
- Matches played: 16
- Goals scored: 85 (5.31 per match)
- Top scorer: (Ethiopia) Loza Abera (13 goals)
- Best player: (Kenya) Jentrix Shikangwa Milimu
- Best goalkeeper: (Uganda) Daisy Nakaziro
- All statistics correct as of 9 September 2021.

The 2021 CAF Women's Champions League CECAFA Qualifiers is the 1st edition of the CAF Women's Champions League CECAFA Qualifiers, a women's club football championship organised by the CECAFA for the women's clubs of association nations. This edition will held from 7–21 August 2021 in Kenya.

The winner of the tournament will qualify for the inaugural 2021 CAF Women's Champions League which will held later this year.

== Participating clubs ==
The following nine teams will contest in the league. Denden FC from Eritrea and Al-Difaa from Sudan were not selected by CAF. CAF has decided to reject the club's license for failing to meet the criteria for this competition. Scandinavian LFC of Rwanda will not take to the tournament.

| Team | Appearances | Previous best performance |
|---|---|---|
| (Burundi) PVP Buyenzi | 1st | n/a |
| (Djibouti) FAD Club | 1st | n/a |
| (Ethiopia) CBE F.C. | 1st | n/a |
| (Kenya) Vihiga Queens (Host) | 1st | n/a |
| (South Sudan) Yei Join Star FC | 1st | n/a |
| (Tanzania) Simba Queens | 1st | n/a |
| (Uganda) Lady Doves WFC | 1st | n/a |
| (Zanzibar) New Generation FC | 1st | n/a |

== Venues ==
| Cities | Venues | Capacity |
|---|---|---|
| Nairobi | Nyayo National Stadium | 30,000 |
| Kasarani | MISC | 60,000 |

== Match officials ==
Referees

- Shamirah Nabadda (Uganda)
- Suavis Iratunga (Burundi)
- Darlene Nduwayo (Burundi)
- Asnakech Gebire (Ethiopia)
- Medab Wondmu Biftu (Ethiopia)
- Carolyne Wanjala (Kenya)
- Josphine Wanjiku (Kenya)
- Florentina Zabron Chief (Tanzania)

Assistant Referees

- Lydia Nantabo (Uganda)
- Marex Nkumbi Nakitto (Uganda)
- Arcella Uwizera (Burundi)
- Fidès Bangurambona (Burundi)
- Woinshet Kassaye Abera (Ethiopia)
- Yelfashewa Kassahun (Ethiopia)
- Jane Cherono (Kenya)
- Carolyne Kiles (Kenya)
- Janeth Balama (Tanzania)
- Hellen Mduma (Tanzania)

== Draw ==
The draw of the tournament were held on 17 July 2021. Nine club's were divided into three groups. Groups winner and from three groups and one best 2nd place team will through to Knockout stage.

== Group summary ==
| Group A | Group B |
|---|---|
| (Burundi) PVP Buyenzi (Djibouti) FAD Club (Tanzania) Simba Queens (Uganda) Lady Doves WFC | (Ethiopia) CBE F.C. (Kenya) Vihiga Queens (South Sudan) Yei Join Star FC (Zanzibar) New Generation FC |

== Group stage ==
The tournament was played in a two groups format.

Tiebreakers

Teams are ranked according to points (3 points for a win, 1 point for a draw, 0 points for a loss), and if tied on points, the following tiebreaking criteria are applied, in the order given, to determine the rankings.

1. Points in head-to-head matches among tied teams;
2. Goal difference in head-to-head matches among tied teams;
3. Goals scored in head-to-head matches among tied teams;
4. If more than two teams are tied, and after applying all head-to-head criteria above, a subset of teams are still tied, all head-to-head criteria above are reapplied exclusively to this subset of teams;
5. Goal difference in all group matches;
6. Goals scored in all group matches;
7. Penalty shoot-out if only two teams are tied and they met in the last round of the group;
8. Disciplinary points (yellow card = 1 point, red card as a result of two yellow cards = 3 points, direct red card = 3 points, yellow card followed by direct red card = 4 points);
9. Drawing of lots.

=== Group A ===
| Pos | Team | Pld | W | D | L | GF | GA | GD | Pts | Qualification |
|---|---|---|---|---|---|---|---|---|---|---|
| 1 | (Tanzania) Simba Queens | 3 | 2 | 1 | 0 | 14 | 1 | +13 | 7 | Knockout stage |
| 2 | (Uganda) Lady Doves WFC | 3 | 2 | 1 | 0 | 8 | 0 | +8 | 7 | Knockout stage |
| 3 | (Burundi) PVP Buyenzi | 3 | 1 | 0 | 2 | 3 | 8 | −5 | 3 | |
| 4 | (Djibouti) FAD Club | 3 | 0 | 0 | 3 | 1 | 17 | −16 | 0 | |

28 August 2021
13:00 UTC+2

| Lady Doves (Uganda) | 5–0 | (Djibouti) FAD Club |
|---|---|---|
| Nabbossa 16'; Ikwaput 30', 85'; Abdillahi 60' (o.g.); Doumba 53' | Report |

Nyayo National Stadium, Nairobi
Attendance: 0 (close doors)
Referee: Medab Wondmu Biftu (Ethiopia)
28 August 2021
16:00 UTC+2

| PVP Buyenzi (Burundi) | 1–4 | (Tanzania) Simba Queens |
|---|---|---|
| Rehema 52' (pen.) | Report | Bhobho 2'; Mawete 32', 88' (pen.); Juma 75' |

Nyayo National Stadium, Nairobi
Attendance: 0 (close doors)
Referee: Carolyne Wanjala (Kenya)

31 August 2021
13:00 UTC+2

| Lady Doves (Uganda) | 0–0 | (Tanzania) Simba Queens |
|---|---|---|
| | Report |

MISC, Kasarani
Attendance: 0 (close doors)
Referee: Asnakech Gebire (Ethiopia)
31 August 2021
16:00 UTC+2

| PVP Buyenzi (Burundi) | 2 –1 | (Djibouti) FAD Club |
|---|---|---|
| Rehema 22', 53' | | Lerman 37' |

Nyayo National Stadium, Nairobi
Attendance: 0 (close doors)
Referee: Josphine Wanjiku (Kenya)

3 September 2021
13:00 UTC+2

| Lady Doves (Uganda) | 3–0 | (Burundi) PVP Buyenzi |
|---|---|---|
| Spencer (?); Alupo (?); Ikwaput (?) | Report |

Nyayo National Stadium, Nairobi
Attendance: 0 (close doors)
3 September 2021
13:00 UTC+2

| Simba Queens (Tanzania) | 10–0 | (Djibouti) FAD Club |
|---|---|---|
| Mawete (?); Clement (?); Nnunka (?); Djafari (?) | Report |

MISC, Kasarani
Attendance: 0 (close doors)
Referee: Darlene Nduwayo (Burundi)

=== Group B ===
| Pos | Team | Pld | W | D | L | GF | GA | GD | Pts | Qualification |
|---|---|---|---|---|---|---|---|---|---|---|
| 1 | (Ethiopia) CBE F.C. | 3 | 3 | 0 | 0 | 24 | 3 | +21 | 9 | Knockout stage |
| 2 | (Kenya) Vihiga Queens (H) | 3 | 2 | 0 | 1 | 21 | 4 | +17 | 6 | Knockout stage |
| 3 | (South Sudan) Yei Join Stars FC | 3 | 1 | 0 | 2 | 2 | 22 | −20 | 3 | |
| 4 | (Zanzibar) New Generation FC | 3 | 0 | 0 | 3 | 2 | 20 | −18 | 0 | |

(H) Hosts
29 August 2021
13:00 UTC+2

| Yei Join Stars (South Sudan) | 2–1 | (Zanzibar) New Generation FC |
|---|---|---|
| Joseph 14'; Debora Joseph 38' | Report | Juma 63' |

Nyayo National Stadium, Nairobi
Attendance: 0 (close doors)
Referee: Suavis Iratunga (Burundi)
29 August 2021
16:00 UTC+2

| CBE F.C. (Ethiopia) | 4–2 | (Kenya) Vihiga Queens |
|---|---|---|
| Busser 9', 22', 69'; Abera 78' | Report | Achieng 12', 39' |

Nyayo National Stadium, Nairobi
Attendance: 0 (close doors)
Referee: Shamirah Nabadda (Uganda)

1 September 2021
13:00 UTC+2

| CBE F.C. (Ethiopia) | 10–1 | (Zanzibar) New Generation FC |
|---|---|---|
| Awol 8' (?); Abera (?), 58' (87.pen); Tadesse (?); Asfaw 75' | Report | Mpanja 18' |

MISC, Kasarani
Attendance: 0 (close doors)
Referee: Darlene Nduwayo (Burundi)
1 September 2021
16:00 UTC+2

| Yei Join Stars (South Sudan) | 0–11 | (Kenya) Vihiga Queens |
|---|---|---|
| | Report | Engesha (?), 50'; Achien’g (?), 67'; Wanyonyi (?), 65'; Shikangwa (?), 70' |

MISC, Kasarani
Attendance: 0 (close doors)
Referee: Florentina Zabron Chief (Tanzania)

3 September 2021
16:00 UTC+2

| CBE F.C. (Ethiopia) | 10–0 | (South Sudan) Yei Join Stars |
|---|---|---|
| Abera 14', 25', 31', 37', 59', 79'; Awol 9', 36'; Worana 34' (? ) | Report |

MISC, Kasarani
Attendance: 0 (close doors)
Referee: Josphine Wanjiku (Kenya)
3 September 2021
16:00 UTC+2

| New Generation FC (Zanzibar) | 0-8 | (Kenya) Vihiga Queens |
|---|---|---|
| | Report | Shikangwa 19', 75', 90+2'; Engesha 52' (?); Anyango 62'; Achieng 87' |

Nyayo National Stadium, Nairobi
Attendance: 0 (close doors)
Referee: Asnakech Gebire (Ethiopia)

== Knockout stage ==
=== Bracket ===
Semifinals
6 September – Nairobi
(Tanzania) Simba Queens | 1
(Kenya) Vihiga Queens | 2
6 September – Nairobi
(Ethiopia) CBE F.C. (p) | 1 (5)
(Uganda) Lady Doves WFC | 1 (3)

Final
9 September – Nairobi
(Kenya) Vihiga Queens | 2
(Ethiopia) CBE F.C. | 1
Third place
9 September – Nairobi
(Tanzania) Simba Queens | 1
(Uganda) Lady Doves WFC | 2

=== Semi-finals ===
6 September 2021
13:00 UTC+2

| (Tanzania) Simba Queens | 1–2 | (Kenya) Vihiga Queens |
|---|---|---|
| Mnunka (?) | Report | Achieng (?); Shikangwa 87' |

Nyayo National Stadium, Nairobi
Referee: Shamirah Nabadda (Uganda)

6 September 2021
16:00 UTC+2

| (Ethiopia) CBE F.C. | 1–1 | (Uganda) Lady Doves WFC |
|---|---|---|
| Abera 8' | Report | Ikwaput 51' |
Penalties
| | 5–3 |

Nyayo National Stadium, Nairobi
Referee: Carolyne Wanjala (Kenya)

=== Third place match ===
9 September 2021
13:00 UTC+2

| (Tanzania) Simba Queens | 1–2 | (Uganda) Lady Doves WFC |
|---|---|---|
| Djafari (?) | Report | Nakacwa 21'; Ikwaput 83' |

MISC, Kasarani
Referee: Josphine Wanjiku (Kenya)

=== Final ===
9 September 2021
16:00 UTC+2

| (Kenya) Vihiga Queens | 2–1 | (Ethiopia) CBE F.C. |
|---|---|---|
| Shikangwa (?) | Report | Makokha 52' (o.g.) |

MISC, Kasarani
Referee: Suavis Iratunga (Burundi)

== Statistics ==
=== Goalscorers ===
There have been 85 goals scored in 16 matches, for an average of 5.31 goals per match (as of 9 September 2021).

| Rank | Player | Team | Goals |
|---|---|---|---|
| 1 | (Ethiopia) Loza Abera | (Ethiopia) CBE FC | 13 |
| 2 | (Ethiopia) Medina Busser | (Ethiopia) CBE FC | 8 |
| 3 | (Kenya) Jentrix Shikangwa | (Kenya) Vihiga Queens | 7 |
| 4 | (Kenya) Maurine Achieng | (Kenya) Vihiga Queens | 6 |
| 5 | (Democratic Republic of the Congo) Flavine Mawete | (Tanzania) Simba Queens | 5 |
| 5 | (Uganda) Fazila Ikwaput | (Uganda) Lady Doves | 5 |
| 5 | (Kenya) Tereza Engesha | (Kenya) Vihiga Queens | 5 |
| 8 | (Kenya) Violet Wanyonyi | (Kenya) Vihiga Queens | 4 |
| 9 | (Democratic Republic of the Congo) Nicole Rehema | (Burundi) PVP Buyenzi | 3 |
| 9 | (Tanzania) Aisha Nnunka | (Tanzania) Simba Queens | 3 |
| 9 | (Tanzania) Asha Djafari | (Tanzania) Simba Queens | 3 |
| 9 | (Tanzania) Opah Clement | (Tanzania) Simba Queens | 3 |
| 13 | (Ethiopia) Tseganesh Yesus | (Ethiopia) CBE FC | 2 |
| 13 | (Uganda) Nakacwa Spencer | (Uganda) Lady Doves | 2 |
| 15 | (Djibouti) Lerman Sikieh | (Djibouti) FAD Club | 1 |
| 15 | (Ethiopia) Emeber Adisu Asfaw | (Ethiopia) CBE FC | 1 |
| 15 | (Ethiopia) Aregah Kalsa Tadesse | (Ethiopia) CBE FC | 1 |
| 15 | (Kenya) Mercyline Anyango | (Kenya) Vihiga Queens | 1 |
| 15 | (South Sudan) Makunda Joseph | (South Sudan) Yei Join Stars FC | 1 |
| 15 | (South Sudan) Luka Debora Joseph | (South Sudan) Yei Join Stars FC | 1 |
| 15 | (Tanzania) Aisha Juma | (Tanzania) Simba Queens | 1 |
| 15 | (Uganda) Rokiatou Doumba | (Uganda) Lady Doves | 1 |
| 15 | (Uganda) Norah Alupo | (Uganda) Lady Doves | 1 |
| 15 | (Uganda) Riticia Nabbossa | (Uganda) Lady Doves | 1 |
| 15 | (Zanzibar) Hawa Juma | (Zanzibar) New Generation FC | 1 |
| 15 | (Zanzibar) Husna Mpanja | (Zanzibar) New Generation FC | 1 |
| 15 | (Zimbabwe) Danai Bhobho | (Tanzania) Simba Queens | 1 |

=== Own goals ===
| Rank | Player | Team | Goals |
|---|---|---|---|
| 1 | (Djibouti) Hibo Abdi Abdillahi | (Djibouti) FAD Club | 1 |
| 1 | (Ethiopia) Violet Makokha | (Kenya) Vihiga Queens | 1 |
