= KWPL =

KWPL may refer to:

- The Kenyan Women's Premier League of football
- KWPL-LD, a low-power television station (channel 30, virtual 45) licensed to serve Santa Fe, New Mexico, United States
- KWPL, a television station affiliated to The CW Plus in the United States
