= Charles Okere =

Kenyan association football coach

Personal information
- Full name: Charles Okere Okoth
- Date of birth: 23 April 1981 (age 45)
- Place of birth: Mombasa, Kenya

Team information
- Current team: Kenya (assistant coach)

Managerial career
- Years: Team
- 2018–2021: Tusker (assistant coach)
- 2021–2022: Kenya (women)
- 2022–: Kenya (assistant coach)
- 2021: Vihga Queens (interim head coach)
- 2022–2023: Kenya U-20 (assistant coach)
- 2022–2023: Kenya U-23 (assistant coach)
- 2024–2025: Tusker (interim head coach)

Charles Okere Okoth (born 23 April 1981) is a Kenyan football coach. He is currently the assistant coach of the Kenya national football team.

== Career ==
Okere served as coach at Mathare Youth Sports Association, before moving to Nairobi-based Kenya Commercial Bank (KCB) to serve as the assistant coach. In April 2018, he joined Kenyan Premier League side Tusker, as assistant coach to Robert Matano. Over there, he doubled as club's youth head coach. The duo helped team in winning 2020–21 FKF Premier League.

=== Kenya Women ===
On 9 April 2021, Okere was appointed the assistant coach of the Kenya women's national football team. However, on 12 April he was appointed as head coach of the Harambee Starlets, replacing David Ouma. On 20 October 2021, in his first match, he led them to a 8–0 victory over South Sudan in the 2022 AFWCON qualification First round. In the second leg, Kenya won by 7–1, culminating to a 15–1 scoreline on aggregate. Okere doubles as the head coach of the Kenya women's national under-20 football team.

=== Vihiga Queens ===
Okere was appointed as interim head coach of Vihiga Queens in late August 2021 after long-serving coach Alex Alumirah parted ways with the club just one week to the 2021 CAF Champions League regional CECAFA qualifiers. Okere led the team to the final where they beat Commercial Bank of Ethiopia by 2–1 in the final at Moi International Sports Centre, Kasarani to qualify for the 2021 CAF Women's Champions League final tournament.

He continued his role as interim coach during the final tournament with the club being draw in the same group as Mamelodi Sundowns (South Africa), ASAFAR Club (Morocco) and Rivers Angels (Nigeria). On 6 November 2021, they lost their first match by 1–0 against Mamelodi Sundowns Ladies. However, he led them to a 2–0 victory over ASFAR. After the competition, Boniface Nyamunyamu replaced him in a full time role.

=== Tusker F.C. ===
Following the departure of long-time head coach Robert Matano, Tusker appointed Okere to serve as interim head coach. In December 2024, Tusker chairman Charles Gacheru confirmed that Okere will remain as head coach through the end of the season.

== Honours ==
Vihiga Queens

- CECAFA Women's Champions League: 2021
