= Munuki FC =

- Full name: Munuki Football Club
- Ground: Buluk Playground, South Sudan
- Capacity: 12,000
- Chairman: Moulona Reech Ring
- Manager: Mohammed Adam
- League: South Sudan Football Championship

Munuki FC is a South Sudanese football club located in Juba, South Sudan which currently plays in the South Sudan Football Championship.

== History ==
The club was founded in 1988 as Munuki Social, Cultural and Sports Club and plays at south sudan premier league the 10,357 capacity Munuki Playing Ground.

Munuki Social, Cultural and Sports Club is known as one of the biggest club in the country.

== Current squad (2020-2021) ==
Note: Flags indicate national team as defined under FIFA eligibility rules; some limited exceptions apply. Players may hold more than one non-FIFA nationality.

No.	Pos.	Nation	Player
1	GK	SSD	Emmanuel Disi
2	DF	SSD	Wilson Tito
3	DF	SSD	Akol Geofrey
4	DF	SSD	Rehan Angier
5	DF	SSD	Emmanuel Laku
6	DF	SSD	Nelson Peter
7	MF	SSD	Yamandu Twakali
8	MF	SSD	Samuel Solong
9	MF	SSD	Raui Gai
10	MF	SSD	Robert Wurube
11	MF	SSD	Stephen Pawar
12	GK	SSD	Balia Michael
13	DF	SSD	Daniel Abaker
14	MF	UGA	Suleiman Kaggwa
15	DF	SSD	Daniel Jenario
16	MF	SSD	Denis Deng
17	DF	SSD	David Farouk
18	FW	SSD	Lado Felgrino
19	DF	SSD	Emmanuel Patrick

No.	Pos.	Nation	Player
20	FW	SSD	Joseph Loro
21	DF	SSD	Tutu Awach
22	GK	SSD	Mohammed Saife
23	DF	SSD	Peter Akon
24	MF	SSD	Sebit Juma
25	DF	UGA	Ngalamu Ambrose
26	MF	NGA	Peter Uzeogbu
27	DF	SSD	Dominic Angelo
28	MF	SSD	Philip Henry
29	MF	SSD	Daniel Angelo
30	FW	SSD	Rauch Matary
31	MF	SSD	Emmanuel Juma
32	FW	NGA	Godwill Uche
33	MF	SSD	Jwok Panyak
34	FW	LBR	Drville Alex
35	MF	UGA	Mugisha Dan
36	FW	SSD	Daud Wesley
37	MF	SSD	Yona Morris
38	DF	SSD	Eric Emmanuel

== Notoble coaches ==
(South Sudan)

- Nicola Peter
- Peter Orot
- Willam Mayor
- Mohammed Adam
- Remzi Sebit
- Alhaj

== Notable former players ==
(South Sudan)

- Jimmy Wani Boja
- Emmanuel Juma
- Dennis Deng
- Sebit Juma
- Jimmy Mandela
- Pal Paul Puk
- Chan Peter
- Jack James
- Dominic Korneli
- Mohammed Ibrahim
- Daniel de Rossi
