= Zanele Nhlapho =

South African soccer player (born 1991)

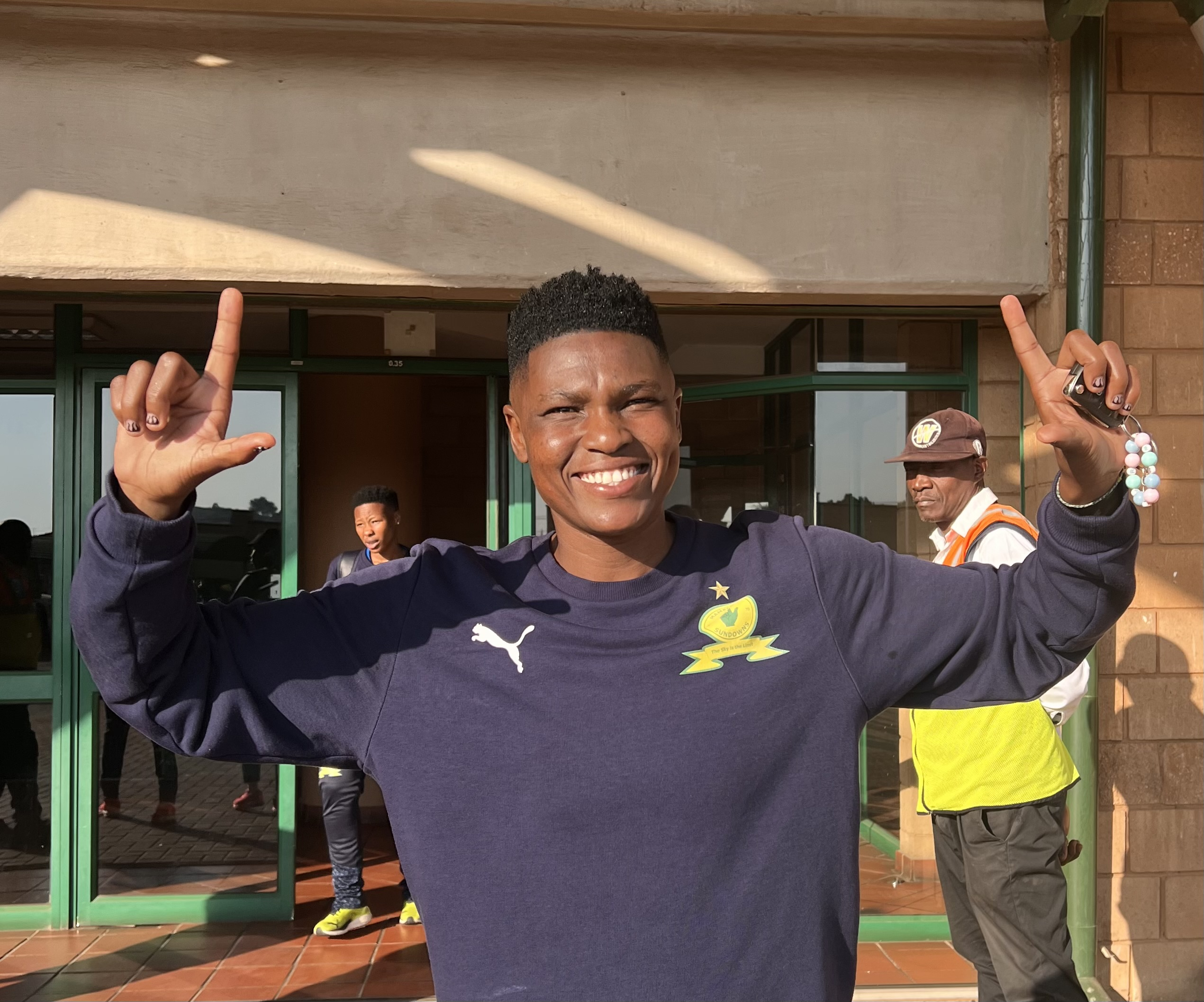

Personal information
- Full name: Zanele Portia Nhlapho
- Date of birth: 24 June 1991 (age 35)
- Position: Defender

Senior career*
Years	Team	Apps	(Gls)
2007–2019	Mamelodi Sundowns		
2019–2020	KF Apolonia Fier		
2020	KFF Mitrovica		
2020–2025	Mamelodi Sundowns		

Managerial career
- 2023–2024: Mamelodi Sundowns Ladies Academy
- * Club domestic league appearances and goals

Zanele Portia Nhlapho (born 24 June 1991) is a South African soccer player who played as a defender.

Nhlapho captained Mamelodi Sundowns to the inaugural CAF Women's Champion's League.

== Club career ==
=== KF Apolonia ===
In 2019, she played for Albanian Women's National Championship side KF Apolonia Fier during the 2019/20 season when the side finished second in their league.

=== KFF Mitrovica ===
In 2020, she signed for Kosovo Women's Football League side KFF Mitrovica but the deal fall through due to COVID-19.

=== Mamelodi Sundowns Ladies ===
She then joined SAFA Women's League side Mamelodi Sundowns and captained the side that won the 2021 CAF Women's Champions League and were runner's up for the 2022 CAF Women's Champions League.

In 2021, she was nominated for the CAF Women Interclub Player of the Year award and made it to the 2021 CAF Women’s Champions League's team of the tournament.

She captained the club to their second continental titles, the 2023 CAF Women's Champions League and 2023 COSAFA Women's Champions League, and was added to the team of the tournament for 2023. They also won the 2023 and 2024 Hollywoodbets Super League title.

== Honours ==
Mamelodi Sundowns Ladies

- CAF Women's Champions League: 2021, 2023 runner-up: 2022
- COSAFA Women's Champions League: 2021, 2023 runner-up: 2022
- SAFA Women's League: 2019-20, 2021, 2022, 2023, 2024
- Sasol League National Championship: 2013, 2015

KF Apolonia Fier

- Albanian Women's National Championship: runners-up: 2019/20

=== Individual ===
- CAF Women's Champions League Team of the Tournament: 2021, 2023
