= FKF Women's Division One =

- Country: Kenya
- Confederation: CAF
- Number of clubs: 11
- Level on pyramid: 2
- Promotion to: Premier League
- Current: Current season

The FKF Women's Division One is the second tier women's football league in the Kenyan football league system. It is controlled by the Football Kenya Federation.
