= Ghizlane Chhiri =

Moroccan footballer

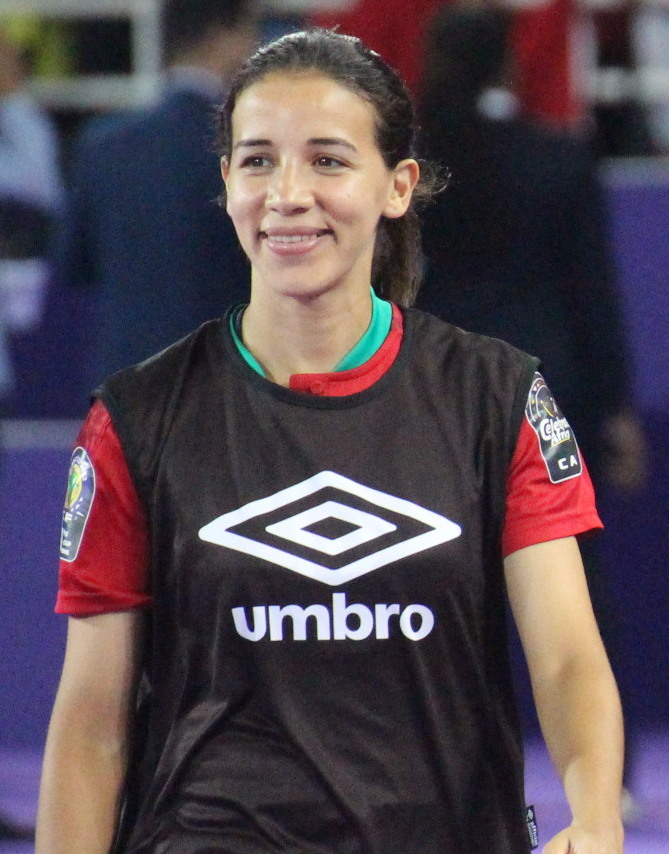
- Chhiri with Morocco at the 2022 Women's Africa Cup of Nations

Personal information
- Date of birth: 11 September 1994 (age 32)
- Place of birth: Agadir, Morocco
- Height: 1.68 m (5 ft 6 in)
- Position: Defender

Team information
- Current team: ASFAR
- Number: 15

Senior career*
| Years | Team | Apps | (Gls) |
| 2018– | ASFAR | | |

International career^{‡}
| 2013– | Morocco | 7 | (0) |
Medal record
Representing Morocco
Women's Africa Cup of Nations
| Second place | 2022 Morocco |
- * Club domestic league appearances and goals ‡ National team caps and goals as of 31 October 2023

Ghizlane Chhiri (Arabic: غزلان الشهيري; born 11 September 1994) is a Moroccan professional footballer who plays as a defender for AS FAR and the Morocco women's national team.

== Club career ==
Chhiri made her first appearances with Raja Agadir. She continued her training with Najah Sous, before she joined AS FAR in 2018. With AS FAR, she has won five Championships and three Throne Cups.

AS FAR participated in the 2021 CAF Women's Champions League. She was an official player in all matches. She received a yellow card in their semifinal loss to Hasaacas. AS FAR finished third.

Chhiri also played in the 2022 CAF Women's Champions League with AS FAR. In the group stage, she provided three assists: one against Simba Queens, and two against Determine Girls. In the latter game, she won player of the match. AS FAR went on to win the tournament, beating Mamelodi Sundowns 4–0 in the final.

== International career ==
Chhiri has capped for Morocco at senior level. She has participated in a number of selections and invitations to training, matches, and friendly tournaments under multiple different coaches. She participated in the 2018 WAFCON qualifiers, as well as qualifiers for the 2020 Olympics, though Morocco failed to qualify for both.

Chhiri was part of the team that won the UNAF Championship in 2020. She also participated in the Aisha Buhari Cup in 2021, in which Morocco finished second.

Chhiri injured her ankle on 18 June 2022 against Zambia, a few days before the 2022 Women's Africa Cup of Nations. Though she was injured, it was not serious, and she was still included in the 26-player squad selected by Reynald Pedros to play in the tournament. Morocco finished second, losing in the final to South Africa.

She participated in preparations for the 2023 Women's World Cup, playing in a friendly against Canada in which Morocco lost 4–0, and a 0–0 tie against Switzerland. Chhiri was not chosen as part of the 2023 Women's World Cup squad.

== Honours ==
AS FAR

- Moroccan Women's Championship (6): 2019, 2020, 2021, 2022, 2023, 2024
- Moroccan Women Throne Cup: 2019, 2020, 2021, 2022, 2023
- UNAF Women's Champions League: 2021, 2024
- CAF Women's Champions League: 2022; third place: 2021, 2023

Morocco

- Women's Africa Cup of Nations runner-up: 2022
- UNAF Women's Tournament: 2020

Individual

- CAF Women's Champions League Team of the Tournament: 2021

== See also ==
- List of Morocco women's international footballers
