= Kenya women's national football team =

Women's national football team representing Kenya

Kenya
- Nickname: Harambee Starlets
- Association: Football Kenya Federation
- Confederation: CAF
- Sub-confederation: CECAFA
- Head coach: Beldine Odemba
- Captain: Ruth Ingotsi
- Most caps: Wendy Achieng (30)
- Top scorer: Sigi Musembi
- Home stadium: Moi International Sports Centre
- FIFA code: KEN
First colours	Second colours	Third colours

FIFA ranking
- Current: 128 (16 June 2026)
- Highest: 108 (December 2017 – March 2018)
- Lowest: 151 (December 2023 – August 2024)

First international
- Kenya 7–0 Djibouti (Nairobi, Kenya; 26 March 2006)

Biggest win
- Kenya 12–0 Djibouti (Mbagala, Tanzania; 19 November 2019)

Biggest defeat
- Kenya 0–5 Cameroon (Nairobi, Kenya; 5 August 2006); Ethiopia 5–0 Kenya (Addis Ababa, Ethiopia; 30 September 2012); Kenya 0–5 Chile (Antalya, Turkey; 7 March 2020)

World Cup
- Appearances: 0

Olympic Games
- Appearances: 0

African Women's Championship
- Appearances: 2 (first in 2016)
- Best result: Group stage (2016, 2026)

The Kenya women's national football team represents Kenya in women's football and is controlled by the Football Kenya Federation.

== History ==
The first women's league in Kenya and national team were created in 1985 at a time when almost no country in the world had a women's national football team. The national team is nicknamed the Harambee Starlets and national team players are not full-time professional players. They need to have other employment.

In 1993, Kenya Women's Football Federation was created and organised a national team that represented the country several times in international tournaments between its founding and 1996. In 1996, the Kenya Women's Football Federation folded under pressure from FIFA and women's football was subsumed by the Kenya Football Federation, with women being represented in the organisation as a subcommittee. Kenya Football Federation took over the management of the women's national team.

In a 22 September 1998 game in Nairobi, Kenya beat South Africa 1-0. In a match in the same city two days later, they lost to South Africa 1–2. In 2002, the national team played a game. The team played in qualifying matches for Olympics in 2003. In 2004, the team played 2 games.

The team played in qualifying matches for the African Cup of Nations in 2006. In 2006, the team played 3 games. In 2006, the national team had 3 training sessions a week. Djibouti women's national football team played Kenya in Nairobi on 26 March 2006, with Kenya winning 7–0, holding a lead of 4–0 at the half. On 22 July 2006, Kenya played Cameroon women's national football team in Yaounde. Cameroon was up 2–0 at the half and went on to win the game 4–0. On 5 August 2006, Kenya played Cameroon in Nairobi. Cameroon was ahead 3–0 at the half and went on to win the game 5–0. In the 2007 African Games qualifying tournament, Kenya beat Tanzania 2–1. In 2010, the country had a team at the African Women's Championships during the preliminary round but withdrew and ultimately did not compete.

In 2011, Grace Sayo was the team captain. The country did not have a team competing at the 2011 All Africa Games. The country was supposed to participate in qualifiers for the 2011 All Africa Games but the national federation withdrew the team after ten of the team's players had already traveled from the countryside to the capital for a training camp in preparation for an opening match against Tanzania. Women's football administrators in the country asked the government to investigate why the national football federation withdrew from the competition, while still having money available to send the men's national team around the continent for competitions. If they had played the match, it would have been their first international match since 2006 when they beat Djibouti. In the 2012 Africa Women's Seniors Championships, the team withdrew from the competition prior to the first round qualifier.

In March 2012, the team was ranked the 135th best in the world and the 31st best in the CAF. Kenya's average FIFA world rank is 120. In 2011, they were ranked 136. In 2010, they were ranked 128. In 2009, they were ranked 92. In 2008, they were ranked 117. In 2007, they were ranked 144. In 2006, they were ranked 135. Their best move in world rankings was an increase of 24 in June 2007. Their worst move down world rankings was a loss of 27 in December 2007.

In May 2017, the Football Kenya Federation signed a 3-year partnership with kits manufacturer Mafro Sports to providing the kits for all national teams, as well as junior categories. The national team will use red jerseys for home matches, white jerseys for away matches, and green jerseys for matches played on neutral venues.

=== Background and development ===
Early development of the women's game at the time colonial powers brought football to the continent was limited as colonial powers in the region tended to take make concepts of patriarchy and women's participation in sport with them to local cultures that had similar concepts already embedded in them. The lack of later development of the national team on a wider international level symptomatic of all African teams is a result of several factors, including limited access to education, poverty amongst women in the wider society, and fundamental inequality present in the society that occasionally allows for female specific human rights abuses. When quality female football players are developed, they tend to leave for greater opportunities abroad. Continent wide, funding is also an issue, with most development money coming from FIFA, not the national football association. Future, success for women's football in Africa is dependent on improved facilities and access by women to these facilities. Attempting to commercialise the game and make it commercially viable is not the solution, as demonstrated by the current existence of many youth and women's football camps held throughout the continent.

Women's football gained popularity in the country during the 1990s. In 1993, this popularity led to the creation of the female run Kenya Women's Football Federation, who organised a national team that represented the country several times in international tournaments between its founding and 1996. In 1996, the Kenya Women's Football Federation folded under pressure from FIFA and women's football was subsumed by the Kenya Football Federation, with women being represented in the organisation as a subcommittee. Football is the fourth most popular sport for women in the country, trailing behind volley, basketball and field hockey. In 1999, a woman referee from Kenya officiated a match between the Nigerian and South African women's teams in Johannesburg and was treated poorly by fans when she failed to call an offsides. The game was delayed because of the ensuring violence, which included bricks being tossed at her. In 2006, there were 7,776 registered female football players of which 5,418 were registered, under-18 youth players and 2,358 were registered adult players. This followed a pattern of increased registration of female football players in the country with 4,915 total registered players in 2000, 5,000 in 2001, 5,500 in 2002, 6,000 in 2003, 6,700 in 2004 and 7,100 in 2005. In 2006, there were 710 total football teams in the country, with 690 being mixed gendered teams and 20 being women only. In 2006, there were over 3,000 girls playing in seven different leagues around the country. Rights to broadcast the 2011 Women's World Cup in the country were bought by the African Union of Broadcasting.

Kenya Football Federation was created and joined FIFA in 1960. Their kit includes red, green and white shirts, black shorts and black socks. The federation does not have a full-time dedicated employee working on women's football. Women's football is represented on the federation by specific constitutional mandate. FIFA suspended Kenya from all football activities for three months in 2004, due to the interference of the government in football activities. The ban was reversed after the country agreed to create new statutes. On October 25, 2006, Kenya was suspended again from international football for failing to fulfill a January 2006 agreement made to resolve recurrent problems in their football federation. FIFA announced that the suspension would be in force until the federation complies with the agreements previously reached. Rachel Kamweru is the Kenyan women football national chairperson. COSAFA and FIFA reaffirmed a commitment to women's football in the East African countries of Kenya, Ethiopia, Uganda and Tanzania in 2010.

== Team image ==
=== Nicknames ===
The Kenya women's national football team has been known or nicknamed as the "Harambee Starlets".

=== Home stadium ===
Kenya plays their home matches on the Moi International Sports Centre.

=== National youth teams ===
==== Under-20 ====
In 2006, the under-19 national team had 2 training sessions a week. The country participated in the African Women U-20 Championship 2006. They were supposed to play the Republic of Congo in Round 1 but the Republic of Congo withdrew from the competition. In the second round, they played Nigeria in Nigeria, losing 0–8. At home in the return match, they lost 1–2. The under-20 national team competed in the 2010/2011 FIFA U-20 CAF Women's World Cup qualifying competition. They did not advance to the U20 Women's World Cup. In the preliminary round, they tied Lesotho 2–2 in a home match for Lesotho. In the home leg, they beat Lesotho 2–0. In the first round qualifiers, they lost to Zambia 2–1 in a home game for Zambia. They beat Zambia 4–0 in the home leg. In the qualifiers, they lost to Tunisia at home 1–2 in the second round. In 2012, the Zambian side was coached by Martha Kapombo. In the African qualification tournament for the U20 World Cup, Zambia lost to Kenya by an aggregate of 5–2 from the two matches, one home and away for both teams. Zambia lost the second match at Nyayo National Stadium in Nairobi by a score of 0–4. In a mid-February game, they had beaten Kenya 2–1 at Sunset Stadium in Lusaka. Kapombo said of the second game, "We were not prepared to lose to Kenya; actually we knew that we were going to beat them by four goals like they did to us. They changed most of the players who we played with in Zambia and that made it very hard for us in the midfield which failed to click." The Kenyan coach Florence Adhiambo said of the game ""We have come very far, we've been training hard and now we've seen what good training can do. We have worked hard to be here and the fans really played a very important role into this victory." The leg winner was scheduled to play Tunisia in the second round. The Kenyans played Tunisian on 31 March 2012 at the Nyayo National Stadium in Tunisia. In the lead up to the game, the team had a three-week training camp. They were coached by Florence Adhiambo in the game. Ksh.700, 000 was given to the team by the Kenyan Prime Minister to support their World Cup aspirations. Additional funding came from UNICEF, Procter and Gamble, and Coca-Cola.

==== Under-17 ====
In 2006, the U-17 national team had 2 training sessions a week. They competed in the African Women U-17 Qualifying Tournament 2010. Botswana beat them in the opening round in a walkover win after Kenya withdrew from the tournament. The women's U-17 team competed in the CAF qualifiers for the FIFA U-17 World Cup that will be held in Azerbaijan in September 2012. They did not advance out of their region. They played a qualification match in Abeokuta against Nigeria.

== Results and fixtures ==
The following is a list of match results in the last 12 months, as well as any future matches that have been scheduled.

Legend

Win Draw Lose Void or postponed Fixture

=== 2025 ===
24 October 2025 2026 WAFCON qualifying	Kenya	3–1	Gambia	Nairobi
16:00 UTC+3	Jereko 12' (pen.); Adhiambo 19'; Opisa 45+2'	Report (FIFA)	Kanteh 2'	Stadium: Nyayo National Stadium; Referee: Aline Guimbang Etong (Cameroon)

28 October 2025 2026 WAFCON qualifying	Gambia	0–1	Kenya	Thiès (Senegal)
16:00 UTC+0		Report (FIFA)	Jereko 51'	Stadium: Stade Lat-Dior
Note: Kenya won 4–1 on aggregate.

26 November 2025 Friendly	Algeria	2–1	Kenya	Blida, Algeria
17:00 UTC+1	Khezami 47', 90'		Jereko 15'	Stadium: Mustapha Tchaker Stadium; Referee: Dhikra Houia (Algeria)

30 November 2025 Friendly	Algeria	1–1	Kenya	Blida, Algeria
15:00 UTC+1	Belloumou 90+2'		Jereko 65'	Stadium: Mustapha Tchaker Stadium

=== 2026 ===
2 March Friendly	Kenya	0–2	Benin	Abidjan, Ivory Coast
17:00 UTC+0		Report	Sadikou 11'; Gnammi 65'	Stadium: Felix Houphouet Boigny Stadium

4 March Friendly	Ivory Coast	1–0	Kenya	Abidjan, Ivory Coast
19:00 UTC+0	Elloh 22'	Report		Stadium: Alassane Ouattara Stadium

11 April 2026 FIFA Series	Kenya	2–0	India	Nairobi, Kenya
18:00 UTC+3	Amnyolet 2'; Engesha 57'	Report (FIFA)		Stadium: Nyayo National Stadium; Referee: Josephine Nantongo (Uganda)

15 April 2026 FIFA Series	Kenya	0–2	Australia	Nairobi, Kenya
18:00 UTC+3		Report (FIFA)	Kerr 25'; Wheeler 54'	Stadium: Nyayo National Stadium; Referee: Yordanos Mulugeta (Ethiopia)

26 July 2026 WAFCON GS	Morocco	4–0	Kenya	Rabat, Morocco
21:00 UTC+1	Ouzraoui 19'; Atiq 29'; Jraïdi 32', 47'	Report (FIFA)		Stadium: Moulay El Hassan Stadium; Referee: Vincentia Amedome (Togo)

30 July 2026 WAFCON GS	Senegal	1–0	Kenya	Rabat, Morocco
18:00 UTC+0	Mbengue 35'	Report (FIFA)		Stadium: Rabat Olympic Stadium; Referee: Yemisi Akintoye (Nigeria)

3 August 2026 WAFCON GS	Kenya	0–2	Algeria	Rabat, Morocco
21:00 UTC+0		Report (FIFA)	Dafeur 14'; Bendris 23'	Stadium: Rabat Olympic Stadium; Referee: Aïssatou Kanté (Guinea)

8 October 2028 CAF Women's Olympic Q	Seychelles	0–11	Kenya	Nairobi, Kenya
15:00 UTC+3		Report	Nekesa 8', 43'; Muteshi 25', 54'; Madalina 61', 82'; Amunyolete 83'; Airo 86', 90+1'; Mideva 87', 90+3'	Stadium: Nyayo National Stadium; Referee: Cacilda Fernando (Mozambique)

== Coaching staff ==
=== Current coaching staff ===
As of April 2021

Position	Name	Ref.
Head coach	(Kenya) Beldin Odemba	
Assistant coach	(Kenya) Godfrey Oduor	
Assistant coach	(Kenya) Mildred Cheche	

=== Manager history ===
- Justine Omojong Okiring (2014–2015)
- David Ouma (2015–2017)
- Ann Aluoch (2017–2019)
- Paul Bitok (2019–2020)
- David Ouma (2020–2021)
- Charles Okere (2021–2022)
- Baraka Olindah (2022-2023)
- Beldine Odemba (2023-)

== Players ==
=== Current squad ===
- The following players were called up for the 2026 WAFCON matches from 26 July through 16 August 2026. . They announced their final 24-player squad on 21 July.

No.	Pos.	Player	Date of birth (age)	Club
1	GK	Vivian Shiyonzo	13 August 2002 (aged 23)	(Football Kenya Federation) Kibera Soccer
2	MF	Mwanalima Adam Jereko (captain)	4 September 1997 (aged 28)	(Danish Football Association) HB Køge
3	DF	Vivian Nasaka	19 December 1999 (aged 26)	(Turkish Football Federation) Hakkarigücü Spor
4	DF	Mary Nthambi	22 January 1999 (aged 27)	(Football Kenya Federation) Kenya Police Bullets
5	DF	Leah Andiema	14 April 1998 (aged 28)	(Football Kenya Federation) Kenya Police Bullets
6	MF	Lorna Nyarinda	13 October 2000 (aged 25)	(Football Kenya Federation) Kenya Police Bullets
7	FW	Shalyne Opisa	27 August 2004 (aged 21)	(Federation of Uganda Football Associations) Amus College
8	MF	Martha Amunyolet	5 January 2000 (aged 26)	(Football Kenya Federation) Vihiga Queens
9	MF	Tereza Engesha	15 December 1998 (aged 27)	(Football Kenya Federation) Kenya Police Bullets
10	FW	Marion Serenge	3 November 2007 (aged 18)	(Federation of Uganda Football Associations) St. Noa Girls
11	DF	Norah Ann	14 September 2002 (aged 23)	(Football Kenya Federation) Kenya Police Bullets
12	MF	Mercy Airo	20 October 1999 (aged 26)	(Football Kenya Federation) Ulinzi Starlets
13	DF	Elizabeth Ochaka	9 June 2009 (aged 17)	(Football Kenya Federation) Kenya Police Bullets
14	MF	Shaline Nambengele	11 November 2005 (aged 20)	(Football Kenya Federation) Ulinzi Starlets
15	FW	Valerie Nekesa	24 July 2007 (aged 19)	(Football Kenya Federation) Soccer Assassins
16	MF	Airine Madalina	17 December 2000 (aged 25)	(Football Kenya Federation) Vihiga Queens
17	FW	Eglay Mukhwana	14 July 2004 (aged 22)	(Football Kenya Federation) Trinity Starlets
18	GK	Annette Kundu	17 December 1996 (aged 29)	(Football Kenya Federation) Kenya Police Bullets
19	FW	Violet Wanyonyi	20 January 2000 (aged 26)	(Saudi Arabian Football Federation) United Eagles
20	DF	Ruth Ingosi	19 December 1993 (aged 32)	(Tanzania Football Federation) Simba Queens
21	MF	Fasila Adhiambo	6 January 2006 (aged 20)	(Tanzania Football Federation) Simba Queens
22	DF	Euphrasier Shilwatso	1 July 2003 (aged 23)	(Football Kenya Federation) Kayole Starlets
23	GK	Lilian Awuor	13 June 1999 (aged 27)	(Romanian Football Federation) Farul Constanța
24	DF	Enez Mango	1 July 1993 (aged 33)	(Romanian Football Federation) Farul Constanța

=== Recent call ups ===
Pos.	Player	Date of birth (age)	Caps	Goals	Club	Latest call-up
GK	Mercy Akoth					v. Gambia, 28 October 2025
DF	Tabitha Amoit	5 April 2004 (age 22)			(Kenya) Ulinzi Starlets	v. Gambia, 28 October 2025
DF	Lorine Ilavonga				(Kenya) Ulinzi Starlets	v. Algeria, 30 November 2025
DF	Sheryl Muyera				(Kenya) Zetech Sparks	v. Algeria, 30 November 2025
DF	Dorcas Shikobe	4 April 1989 (age 37)			(Greece) Seirines Grevenon	v. Algeria, 30 November 2025
MF	Lavender Ann				(Kenya) Ulinzi Starlets	v. Gambia, 28 October 2025
MF	Medina Abubakar	7 March 2003 (age 23)			Kenya Police Bullets	v. Algeria, 30 November 2025
MF	Providence Mukalo				(Kenya) Vihiga Queens	v. Algeria, 30 November 2025
MF	Corazone Aquino	23 September 1993 (age 33)			(Tanzania) Simba Queens	v. Algeria, 30 November 2025
MF	Elizabeth Muteshi				(Kenya) Trinity Starlets	v. Algeria, 30 November 2025
FW	Tumaini Waliaula	5 June 1999 (age 27)			(Greece) Seirines Grevenon	v. Gambia, 28 October 2025
FW	Violet Nanjala	20 January 2000 (age 26)			(Saudi Arabia) United Eagles FC	v. Gambia, 28 October 2025
FW	Catherine Khaemba				(Kenya) Bungoma Queens	v. Algeria, 30 November 2025
FW	Elizabeth Wambui				(Kenya)	v. Algeria, 30 November 2025
FW	Emily Moranga	22 February 2006 (age 20)			Kenya Police Bullets	v. Algeria, 30 November 2025

=== Captains ===
- Doreen Nabwire (2013)
- Dorcas Nixon (2016–)

=== Previous squads ===
Africa Women Cup of Nations

- 2016 Africa Women Cup of Nations squads
- 2026 Africa Women Cup of Nations squads

CECAFA Women's Championship

- 2025 CECAFA Women's Championship squads

== Records ==
- Active players in **bold**, statistics correct **as of 2020**.

=== Most capped players ===
#	Player	Year(s)	Caps

=== Top goalscorers ===
#	Player	Year(s)	Goals	Caps

== Competitive record ==
=== FIFA Women's World Cup ===
FIFA Women's World Cup record
Year	Result	Pld	W	D*	L	GS	GA	GD
(China) 1991	did not enter							
(Sweden) 1995	did not qualify							
(United States) 1999	did not qualify							
(United States) 2003	did not qualify							
(China) 2007	did not qualify							
(Germany) 2011	did not qualify							
(Canada) 2015	did not qualify							
(France) 2019	did not qualify							
(Australia) (New Zealand) 2023	did not qualify							
(Brazil) 2027	did not qualify							
(Costa Rica) (Jamaica) (Mexico) (United States) 2031	To be determined							
(United Kingdom) 2035	To be determined							
Total	0/12	0	0	0	0	0	0	0

*Draws include knockout matches decided on penalty kicks.

=== Olympic Games ===
Summer Olympics record
Year	Result	Pld	W	D*	L	GS	GA	GD
(United States) 1996	did not qualify							
(Australia) 2000	did not qualify							
(Greece) 2004	did not qualify							
(China) 2008	did not qualify							
(United Kingdom) 2012	did not qualify							
(Brazil) 2016	did not qualify							
(Japan) 2020	did not qualify							
(France) 2024	did not qualify							
(United States) 2028	To be determined							
Total	0/7	0	0	0	0	0	0	0

*Draws include knockout matches decided on penalty kicks.

=== Africa Women Cup of Nations ===
Africa Women Cup of Nations record
Year	Round	Pld	W	D*	L	GS	GA	GD
1991	Did not qualify							
1995	Did not qualify							
(Nigeria) 1998	Did not qualify							
(South Africa) 2000	Did not qualify							
(Nigeria) 2002	Did not qualify							
(South Africa) 2004	Did not qualify							
(Nigeria) 2006	Did not qualify							
(Equatorial Guinea) 2008	Did not qualify							
(South Africa) 2010	Did not qualify							
(Equatorial Guinea) 2012	Did not qualify							
(Namibia) 2014	Did not qualify							
(Cameroon) 2016	**Group stage**	3	0	0	3	2	10	-8
(Ghana) 2018	Did not qualify							
(Republic of the Congo) 2020	cancelled due to COVID-19							
(Morocco) 2022	Withdrew							
(Morocco) 2024	Did not qualify							
(Morocco) 2026	**Group stage**	3	0	0	3	0	7	-7
Total	Group stage	6	0	0	6	2	17	-15

*Draws include knockout matches decided on penalty kicks.

=== African Games ===
African Games record
Year	Result	Matches	Wins	Draws	Losses	GF	GA
(Nigeria) 2003	Did not enter						
(Algeria) 2007	Did not enter						
(Mozambique) 2011	Did not qualify						
(Republic of the Congo) 2015	Did not enter						
(Morocco) 2019	See Kenya women's national under-20 football team						
(Ghana) 2023	See Kenya women's national under-20 football team						
Total	0/4	0	0	0	0	0	0

=== CECAFA Women's Championship ===
CECAFA Women's Championship
Year	Round	GP	W	D*	L	GS	GA	GD
(Zanzibar) 1986	did not enter							
(Uganda) 2016	**Runners up**	5	4	0	1	23	4	+19
(Rwanda) 2018	**Fourth place**	4	1	1	2	3	3	0
(Tanzania) 2019	**Champion**	5	5	0	0	24	0	+24
(Djibouti) 2021	Cancelled							
(Uganda) 2022	suspended by FIFA							
**Total**	**3/5**	**14**	**10**	**1**	**3**	**50**	**7**	**+43**

== All−time record against FIFA recognized nations ==
The list shown below shows the Kenya national football team's all−time international record against opposing nations.
*As of xxxxxx after match against xxxx.

Key

Positive balance (more wins than losses)
Neutral balance (as many wins as losses)
Negative balance (more losses than wins)

Against	Pld	W	D	L	GF	GA	GD	Confederation

=== Record per opponent ===
*As ofxxxxx after match against xxxxx.

Key

Positive balance (more wins than losses)
Neutral balance (as many wins as losses)
Negative balance (more losses than wins)

The following table shows Kenya's all-time official international record per opponent:

Opponent	Pld	W	D	L	GF	GA	GD	W%	Confederation
Total									—

== See also ==
- Sport in Kenya
  - Football in Kenya
    - Women's football in Kenya
- Kenya women's national under-20 football team
- Kenya women's national under-17 football team
- Kenya men's national football team
