= Mwanalima Adam Jereko =

Kenyan footballer (born 1997)

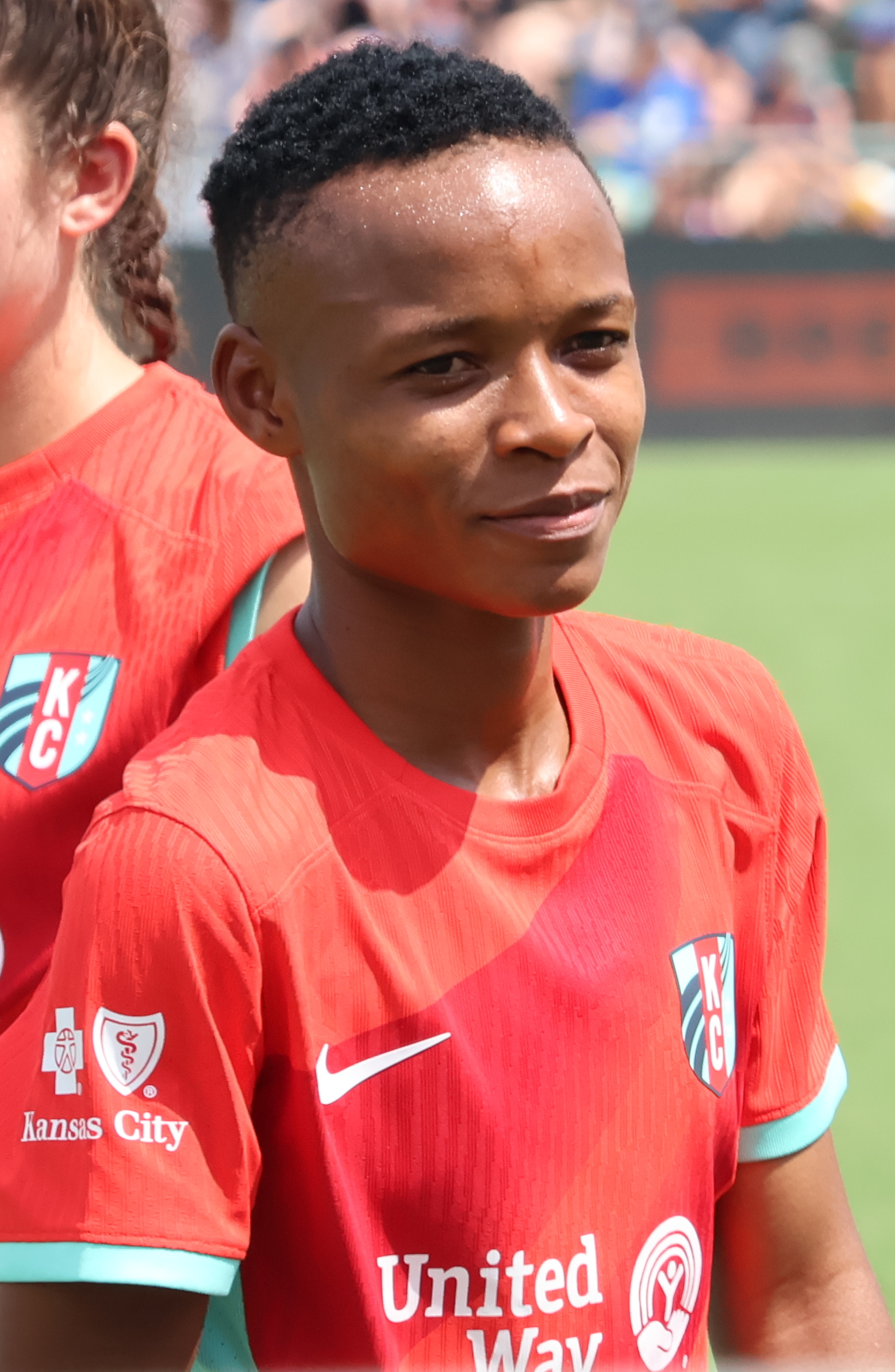
- Jereko with the Kansas City Current in 2024

Personal information
- Full name: Mwanalima Adam Jereko
- Date of birth: 4 September 1997 (age 29)
- Place of birth: Kenya
- Height: 1.62 m (5 ft 4 in)
- Position: Forward

Team information
- Current team: HB Køge

Senior career*
Years	Team	Apps	(Gls)
- Thika Queens
2021–2024	Hakkarigücü Spor	26	(10)
2024–2025	Kansas City Current	4	(0)
2025	→ HB Køge (loan)	8	(0)
2025–	HB Køge	0	(0)

International career
- Kenya
- * Club domestic league appearances and goals as of 02:30, 14 November 2025 (UTC)

Mwanalima Adam Jereko (born 4 September 1997), known simply as Jereko, is a Kenyan professional footballer who plays as a midfielder or forward for Danish Women's League club HB Køge and captains the Kenya national team. She is nicknamed Dogo.

== Club career ==
Jereko began her professional career with Mombasa Olympic while in high school before signing with Kenyan Women's Premier League club Thika Queens F.C. in 2018. She led the league in goals and her team to an undefeated record in 2021.

Later in 2021, Jereko moved to Turkey and signed with Hakkarigücü Spor to play in the 2021–22 Turkish Super League. She scored her first professional hat-trick on 2 April 2022 in a 6–0 win over Dudullu, taking her tally on the season to 11 goals in her first 17 games. She became captain of Hakkarigücü Spor in 2023.

She was signed by NWSL club Kansas City Current on 16 August 2024. On 18 July 2025, the Current loaned Jereko to Danish team HB Køge. After making 8 appearances with Køge, Jereko joined the Danish club on a permanent deal and penned a two-year contract with the team.

== International career ==
Jereko capped for Kenya at senior level during the 2018 Africa Women Cup of Nations qualification.

== Honors ==
Kansas City Current

- NWSL x Liga MX Femenil Summer Cup: 2024

HB Køge

- Danish Women's Cup: 2026

== See also ==
- List of Kenya women's international footballers
