= Vivian Ikechukwu =

Nigerian footballer (born 1997)

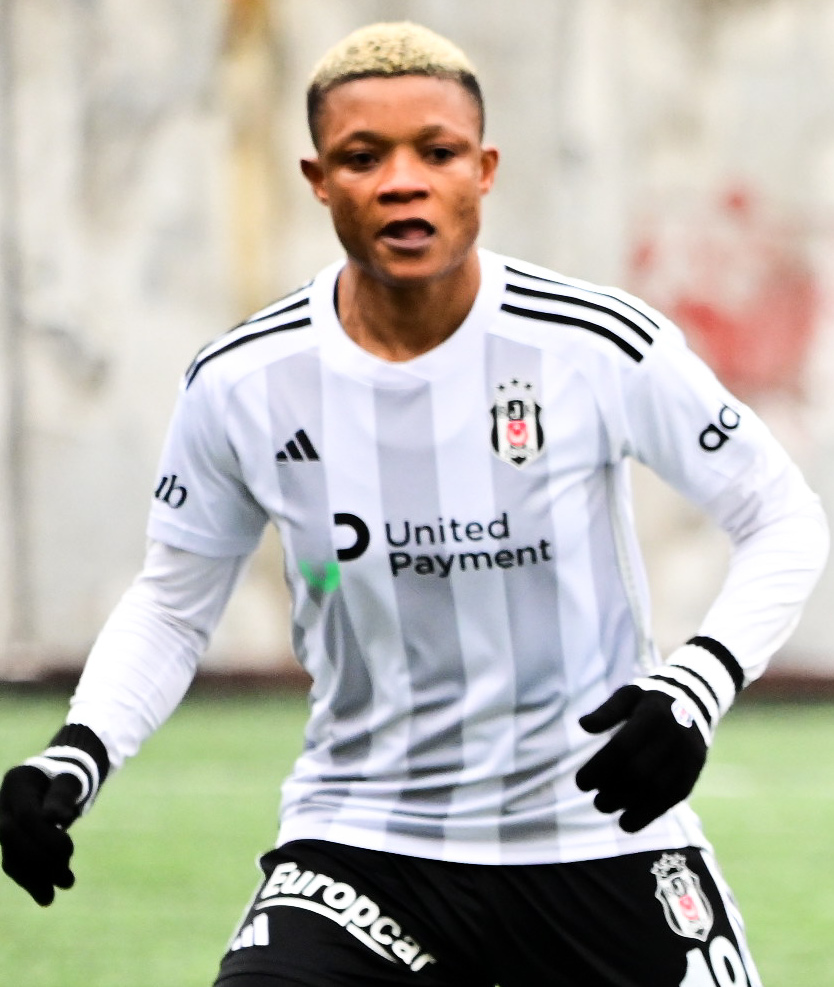
- Ikechukwu in 2023

Personal information
- Full name: Vivian Obianujunwa Ikechukwu
- Date of birth: 10 July 1997 (age 29)
- Place of birth: Nigeria
- Height: 1.68 m (5 ft 6 in)
- Position: Forward

Team information
- Current team: Santos Laguna
- Number: 22

Senior career*
Years	Team	Apps	(Gls)
- Abia Angels F.C.
2018–2022	Rivers Angels		
2022	Gintra Universitetas	19	(14)
2022–2024	Beşiktaş	30	(9)
2024	Cruz Azul	10	(1)
2025–	Santos Laguna	30	(8)

International career
	Nigeria	10	(2)
- * Club domestic league appearances and goals as of 5 February 2026

Vivian Obianujunwa Ikechukwu (born 10 July 1997) is a Nigerian professional footballer who plays as a forward for Liga MX Femenil club Santos Laguna and the Nigeria women's national team.

== Club career ==
Ikechukwu is 1.68 m tall and plays in the forward position.

She began her professional career with Abia Angels F.C. in the NWFL Premiership.

=== Rivers Angels ===
In 2018, Ikechukwu transferred to the Port Harcourt club Rivers Angels F.C. playing in the top-level league NWFL Premiership. She won the 2018 Women's Aiteo Cup held in Yenagoa. Her team became league champion in 2019, and 2020–21 seasons. She played at the 2021 CAF Women's Champions League in Cairo, Egypt, and scored two goals. In February 2022, she was named Player of the Month of the NWPL.

=== Gintra Universitetas ===
In March 2022, Ikechukwu went to Lithuania, and joined the A Lyga club FC Gintra Universitetas. She played at the 2022–23 UEFA Women's Champions League. She scored 14 goals in 19 matches played. Her one-year contract expired in December 2022.

=== Beşiktaş ===
End January 2023, Ikechukwu moved to Turkey, and signed a half-season deal with the Istanbul-based club Beşiktaş J.K. to play in the Turkish Women's Football Super League. In the 2022–23 Super League's second half, she capped in four matches. In May 2023, she suffered calf muscle strain. Her contract with Beşiktaş J.K. was extended for one year in the 2023–24 Super League. She suffered a leg injury in December 2023. She played in 30 official matches for Beşiktaş, where she played for 1.5 seasons. She contributed 9 goals and 5 assists and stayed on the field for over 2.000 minutes.

=== Cruz Azul ===
Middle of July 2024, Ikechukwu moved to Mexico, and signed with the Mexico City-based club Cruz Azul (women) to play in the Liga MX Femenil. She scored a goal in a 4–1 win against Santos Laguna on 17.08.2024. In a statement made by the club in the first week of December, they were announced that Ikechukwu would not continue next season.

== International career ==
Ikechukwu is a member of the Nigeria national team. She scored two goals against South Africa in the Aisha Buhari International Invitational Tournament in 2021. She was part of the fourth-placed nationatl team at the 2022 Women's Africa Cup of Nation in Morocco.

== Personal life ==
Ikechukwu was born in Nigeria on 10 July 1997.

== Honours ==
Rivers Angels F.C.

- NWFL Premiership: 2019, 2020–21
- Women's Aiteo Cup: 2018

FC Gintra Universitetas

- A Lyga: 2022
