= 2021 CAF Women's Champions League WAFU Zone A Qualifiers =

Tournament details
- Host country: Cape Verde
- City: Mindelo
- Dates: 24–30 July
- Teams: 4 (from 4 associations)
- Venue: 1 (in 1 host city)

Final positions
- Champions: (Mali) AS Mandé (1st title)
- Runners-up: (Senegal) AS Dakar Sacré-Cœur
- Third place: (Liberia) Determine Girls

Tournament statistics
- Matches played: 6
- Goals scored: 20 (3.33 per match)
- Top scorer(s): (Mali) Fatoumata Diarra (Senegal) Nguenar Ndiaye (4 goals each)
- Best player: (Mali) Fatoumata Diarra
- Best goalkeeper: (Mali) Aissatou Diallo

The 2021 CAF Women's Champions League WAFU Zone A Qualifiers is the 1st edition of the WAFU Zone A women's club football qualifier tournament organised by the WAFU for the women's clubs of association nations. This edition was held from 24 to 30 July 2021 in Mindelo, Cape Verde. The winners of the tournament qualified for the 2021 CAF Women's Champions League final tournament held in Egypt.

== Participating teams ==
The following four teams contested in the qualifying tournament.

Team	Qualifying method	Appearances	Previous best performance
(Cape Verde) Seven Stars	2018–19 Cape Verdean Women's Championship Champions	1st	n/a
(Liberia) Determine Girls	2020–21 Liberian Women's First Division Champions	1st	n/a
(Mali) AS Mandé	2020–21 Malian Women's Championship Champions	1st	n/a
(Senegal) Dakar Sacré-Cœur	2020–21 Senegalese Women's Championship Champions	1st	n/a

== Match officials ==
=== Referees ===
- (Mauritania) Aïssata Lam
- (Senegal) Mame Coumba Faye
- (The Gambia) Isatou Touray
- (Mali) Rokiatou Fofana
- (Guinea) Felicité Kourouma

=== Assistant referees ===
- (The Gambia) Abbie Leesay
- (The Gambia) Jainaba Manneh
- (Mauritania) Mariem Chedad
- (Mauritania) Houleye Diba
- (Senegal) Fatou Binetou Sène
- (Mali) Fanta Kone
- (Guinea) Fantagbè Kaba
- (Cape Verde) Evandra Furtado

== Qualifying tournament ==
Pos	Team	Pld	W	D	L	GF	GA	GD	Pts	Qualification
1	(Mali) AS Mandé	3	2	1	0	10	2	+8	7	Final tournament
2	(Senegal) Dakar Sacré-Cœur	3	2	0	1	4	6	−2	6	
3	(Liberia) Determine Girls	3	1	0	2	3	6	−3	3	
4	(Cape Verde) Seven Stars (H)	3	0	1	2	3	6	−3	1	

(H) Hosts
24 July 2021

Seven Stars (Cape Verde)	2–2	(Mali) AS Mandé
Lopes 63', 90+1'	Report	Touré 26' (pen.); Diarra 29'

Estádio Municipal Adérito Sena, Mindelo
Attendance: 0 (close doors)
Referee: Isatou Touray (Gambia)
24 July 2021

Determine Girls (Liberia)	1–2	(Senegal) Dakar Sacré-Cœur
Sylla 26'	report(CAF)	Ndiaye 48', 71'

Estádio Municipal Adérito Sena, Mindelo
Attendance: 0 (close doors)
Referee: Aïssata Lam (Mauritania)

27 July 2021

AS Mandé (Mali)	4–0	(Liberia) Determine Girls
Touré 12', 85'; Keita 66'; Diarra 68'	Report

Estádio Municipal Adérito Sena, Mindelo
Attendance: 0 (close doors)
Referee: Mame Coumba Faye (Senegal)
27 July 2021

Dakar Sacré-Cœur (Senegal)	2–1	(Cape Verde) Seven Stars
Ndiaye 51', 76' (pen.)	Report	Semedo 45+2' (pen.)

Estádio Municipal Adérito Sena, Mindelo
Attendance: 0 (close doors)
Referee: Rokiatou Fofana (Mali)

30 July 2021

Seven Stars (Cape Verde)	0–2	(Liberia) Determine Girls
	Report	Agbotsu 40'; Sylla 48' (pen.)

Estádio Municipal Adérito Sena, Mindelo
Attendance: 0 (close doors)
Referee: Félicité Kourouma (Guinea)
30 July 2021

AS Mandé (Mali)	4–0	(Senegal) Dakar Sacré-Cœur
Touré 4'; Diarra 18', 24' (pen.); Traoré 87'	report(CAF)

Estádio Municipal Adérito Sena, Mindelo
Attendance: 0 (close doors)
Referee: Aïssata Lam (Mauritania)

== Awards and statistics ==
=== Goalscorers ===
As of 30 July 2021

Rank	Player	Team	Goals
1	(Mali) Fatoumata Diarra	(Mali) AS Mandé	4
1	(Mali) Bassira Touré	(Mali) AS Mandé	4
1	(Senegal) Nguenar Ndiaye	(Senegal) Dakar Sacré-Cœur	4
4	(Cape Verde) Irlanda Lopes	(Cape Verde) Seven Stars	2
4	(Liberia) Bountou Sylla	(Liberia) Determine Girls	2
6	(Cape Verde) Lúcia Semedo	(Cape Verde) Seven Stars	1
6	(Liberia) Pauline Agbotsu	(Liberia) Determine Girls	1
6	(Mali) Korotoumou Keita	(Mali) AS Mandé	1
6	(Mali) Awa Traoré	(Mali) AS Mandé	1

=== Best player ===
- (Mali) Fatoumata Diarra

=== Best goalkeeper ===
- (Mali) Aïssatou Diallo

=== Fairplay team ===
- (Cape Verde) Seven Stars
