= Seven Stars FF =

Cape Verdean women's football team

Seven Stars
- Full name: Clube Juvenil Seven Stars
- Coach: Gilson Rocha
- League: Campeonato Nacional Feminino
- 2023–2024: 1st of 5

Seven Stars Futebol Feminino, commonly known as Seven Stars is a Cape Verdean women's football team based in Praia that plays in the Campeonato Nacional Feminino, the top-level women's football league in Cape Verde.

The club is the most successful in the archipelago and known as a hub for discovering football talents across the islands, paving the way for players to undergo trials with Portuguese clubs and pursue careers abroad.

== History ==
Following the establishment of the CAF Women's Champions League, the team participated in the qualifying tournament as Cape Verde's title holders. However, after earning just one point from three matches, they failed to secure a spot in the inaugural edition.

In the 2023–24 season, Seven Stars achieved a flawless season winning all 18 matches, scoring 92 goals and conceding just six. Despite the retirement of captain Lúcia Moniz the team maintained its dominance securing their seventh title and cementing their legacy.

== Players ==
=== Current squad ===
As of 23 July 2023

Note: Flags indicate national team as defined under FIFA eligibility rules; some limited exceptions apply. Players may hold more than one non-FIFA nationality.

No.	Pos.	Nation	Player
3	DF	(Cape Verde) CPV	Romina Cardoso
5	DF	(Cape Verde) CPV	Varsénia da Luz
16	DF	(Cape Verde) CPV	Elisiana Monteiro
20	DF	(Cape Verde) CPV	Elsa Frederico
—	DF	(Cape Verde) CPV	Leonora dos Santos
4	MF	(Cape Verde) CPV	Belany Semedo
7	MF	(Cape Verde) CPV	Filo Lopes
8	MF	(Cape Verde) CPV	Dara Silva
15	MF	(Cape Verde) CPV	Edna Monteiro
18	MF	(Cape Verde) CPV	Maria Cabral
—	MF	(Cape Verde) CPV	Aicha lopes

No.	Pos.	Nation	Player
1	GK	(Cape Verde) CPV	Jacinta Rodrigues
12	GK	(Cape Verde) CPV	Jéssica de Pina
7	FW	(Cape Verde) CPV	Filomena Lopes
9	FW	(Cape Verde) CPV	Joseane Lopes
11	FW	(Cape Verde) CPV	Augusta Robalo
13	FW	(Cape Verde) CPV	Dara Centeio
14	FW	(Cape Verde) CPV	Rosâgela Silva
17	FW	(Cape Verde) CPV	Josiane Moreno
18	FW	(Cape Verde) CPV	Nadine Delgado
—	FW	(Cape Verde) CPV	Evy Mendes
—	FW	(Cape Verde) CPV	Nelcy Alves

== Honours ==
- Campeonato Nacional Feminino

Winners (7): 2012–13, 2013–14, 2014–15, 2015–16, 2018–19, 2022–23, 2023–24

- Campeonato Regional Feminino

Winners (3): 2012–13, 2016–17, 2018–19

- Taça Praia

Winners (2): 2017–18, 2018–19
