= Kibera Soccer FC =

Kenyan football club

Kibera Soccer
- Formation: 2002
- Purpose: Football Team
- Headquarters: Kibera, Nairobi
- Affiliations: CFK Africa

Kibera Soccer FC is a professional football club based in Kibera, Nairobi, Kenya. The Kibera Soccer Women's FC is the first women's club from informal settlements to earn promotion to the Kenyan Women's Premier League. The women’s and men’s teams compete weekly and participate in community services with collaborating NGOs, partner schools, and health centers.

== Kibera Soccer FC ==
Kibera Soccer FC was established in 2014 after several boys approached the coaching staff of Kibera Girls Soccer Academy, requesting training. The newly formed team initially participated in tournaments throughout Kibera until 2016, when they registered to compete in the Football Kenya Federation Sub-County League, the lowest tier of the professional Kenyan football leagues. They played one season in this league before being promoted to the county level. The team then spent two seasons in the county league, followed by one season in the regional league and another in the Division 2, where they were crowned champions. In 2021, they were promoted to National Division 1—Zone A (the third tier), where they currently compete.

== Kibera Soccer Women's FC ==
Kibera Soccer Women FC was founded in 2002 as Girls’ Soccer FC to empower the girls in Kibera through sports. There were not many girls’ teams at the time, so they played against boys’ teams and won several tournaments. Football alone did not help solve the girls’ problems, so in 2006, the team was transformed into a full-fledged girls’ high school, Kibera Girls Soccer Academy. Kibera Girls’ Soccer Academy continued participating in the national leagues and was promoted to the Women’s Premier League in 2008, the highest football league in Kenya. Under a new name—Kibera Soccer Women FC—the team was promoted back to the Kenya Women Premier League in 2023, finishing fourth.

== Achievements ==
- 2022 Caretaker League Division One Champions (men)
- 2023 FKF Division One Champions (men)
- 2023 FKF Women’s Cup 2nd Runners up
- 2024 FKF Women's Cup Runners up
- 2025 FKF Women's Cup Winners

== Partnerships ==
Kibera Soccer and Kibera Soccer Women's are partners of CFK Africa, a Kenya-based NGO that empowers youth in informal settlements. In collaboration with CFK Africa programming, Kibera FC players act as mentors to the youth.
