= Zainah Nandede =

Ugandan footballer

Personal information
- Full name: Zainah Nandede
- Date of birth: 15 October 2003 (age 23)
- Place of birth: Mbale City, Uganda
- Position: Winger

Team information
- Current team: Simba Queens
- Number: 11

Youth career
- 2018-2020: She Kataka FC

Senior career*
Years	Team	Apps	(Gls)
2021–2025	KCCA Women FC	43	(26)
2025–	Simba Queens		

International career^{‡}
2019–	Uganda	15	
- * Club domestic league appearances and goals as of 09:16, 15 August 2026 (UTC) ‡ National team caps and goals as of 19:06, 4 October 2026 (EAT)

Zainah Nandede (born 15 October 2003) is a Ugandan football player who plays as a forward for Simba Queens in the Tanzanian Women's Premier League and Uganda Women's National football team the Crested Cranes. She is the 2024 FUFA Woman player of the year.

== Education ==
In 2016 Nandede joined Nkoma SS in Mbale where she sat her senior four in 2018.

Nandede finished Secondary school education at Amus College School Bukedea in 2020.

== Football career ==
Zainah Nandede started her football career in 2018 at local club, Kataka She in Mbale, a city in Eastern Uganda. Before leaving the club in 2021, she had scored 10 goals, contributed six assists in 17 appearances.

Since 2019, Nandede has featured for U17, U20 and senior women football national team. In 2025 she left Kampala Queens FC and joined Simba Queens, she is still a player at senior women football national team the Crested Cranes.

== Club career ==
Her club football started in 2018 at Kataka She a FUFA Eastern Women regional League club. She helped the club to gain promotion to FUFA Women Elite League in 2019.

In 2021, she joined Kampala Queens FC where she left in July 2025 and joined Simba Queens FC in Tanzania.

== International career ==
She played for the National team U17 in 2019, the national team U20 and the National senior team from 2022 to present.

== Honours ==
- 2019: COSAFA U-17 Youth Championship trophy
- 2019: CECAFA U-17 Championship trophy
- 2021: CECAFA Women's U-20 Championship silver medal
- 2022: CECAFA Women's Championship trophy
- 2022/23: FUFA Women Super League champion.
- 2024/25: FUFA Women Super League champion.
- 2024: MTN Federation of Uganda Football Associations Woman player of the year.
- 2024: African Games Bronze
