= AS Kigali Women F.C. =

Rwandan women's football team

AS Kigali WFC
- Full name: AS Kigali Women's Football Club
- Nickname: Citizens (Abanyamujyi)
- Founded: 2008; 18 years ago
- Ground: Kigali Stadium
- Capacity: 22,000
- president: Shema Ngoga Fabrice
- coach: Mbungo Casa André
- League: Rwanda Women's Football League
- Website: http://askigaliwomen.rw/ askigaliwomen.rw

AS Kigali Women's Football Club is a Rwandan women's football club competing in the Rwanda Women's Football League. The club is based in the city of Kigali and plays their home games at Kigali Stadium located in Nyamirambo.

== History ==
AS Kigali, a football club founded in 2008, proudly bears the support of the City of Kigali. It boasts an impressive streak of championship victories from 2009 to 2018.

During the 2017–2018 season, a hard-fought 1–0 victory against Scandinavia WFC on the final matchday secured AS Kigali's tenth consecutive title. However, the following season witnessed an unexpected twist as Kigali failed to claim the championship, marking a historic moment in the club's history.

In the 2021–2022 season, AS Kigali showcased its dominance with 15 wins in 15 matches. Despite a defeat on the final day of the championship, the team still managed to clinch another championship title. This achievement earned them the honor of representing Rwanda in the 2022 CAF Women's Champions League. However, their journey was cut short in the semi-finals of the CAF Women's Champions League CECAFA Qualifiers, losing to the Simba Queens. Nonetheless, Kigali's success continued as they triumphed in the Peace Cup, defeating Kamonyi FC with a commanding 4–0 victory.

In 2023, AS Kigali faced substantial financial challenges, leaving them unable to meet their players' salary demands. The club's sponsor stepped in to rescue them from financial turmoil. This support proved pivotal as AS Kigali secured their 12th Rwandan championship title, demonstrating their resilience and commitment to the sport.

== Honours ==
Type	Competition	Titles	Winning seasons	Runners-up
Domestic	Rwanda Women's Football League	12	2009, 2010, 2011, 2012, 2013, 2014, 2015, 2016, 2017, 2018, 2022, 2023	
Domestic	Peace Cup	3	2019, 2022, 2023	
Domestic	Heroes Cup	1	2019	
