= Asha Djafari =

Burundian footballer

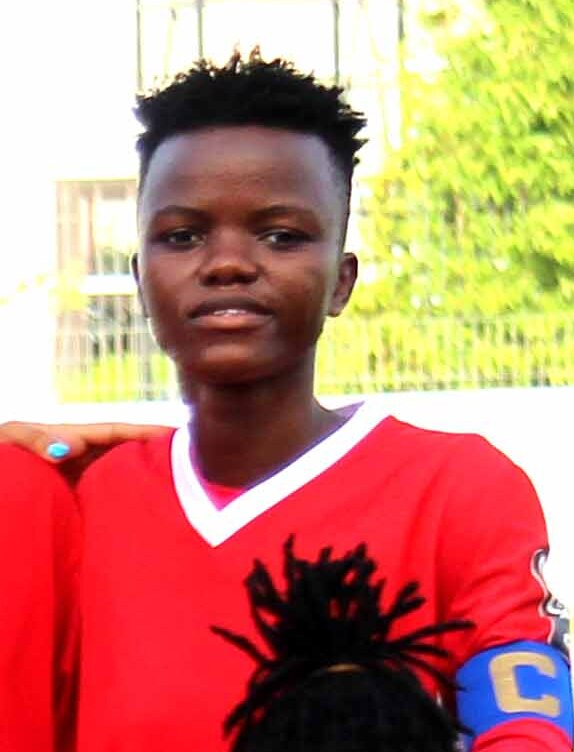
- With the Burundi national team in 2022

Personal information
- Date of birth: 10 July 1998 (age 28)
- Position: Midfielder

Team information
- Current team: Gokulam Kerala

Senior career*
Years	Team	Apps	(Gls)
- Simba Queens
2026–	Gokulam Kerala		

International career^{‡}
2021–	Burundi	2	(0)
- * Club domestic league appearances and goals ‡ National team caps and goals as of 21 February 2022.

Asha Djafari (born 10 July 1998) is a Burundian footballer who plays as a midfielder for the Indian Women's League club Gokulam Kerala and she is the Burundi women's national team.

== Career ==
She also played for the Tanzanian Women's Premier League club Simba Queens.
