= Rwanda Football Federation =

Governing body of association football in Rwanda

CAF
- Founded: 1975
- Headquarters: PO Box 2000; Kigali, Rwanda
- FIFA affiliation: 1978
- CAF affiliation: 1976
- CECAFA affiliation: 1995
- President: Shema Ngoga Fabrice
- Vice-President: MUGISHA Richard
- Website: www.ferwafa.rw

The Rwanda Football Federation (French: Fédération Rwandaise de Football Association, FERWAFA; "Rwandan Association Football Federation"), is the official governing body of association football in Rwanda. It was founded in 1975 and affiliated with CAF and FIFA in 1976 and 1978, respectively. It organizes the Rwanda Premier League and the Rwanda Women's Football League and oversees the men's and women's national teams.

== Principals ==
Executive Committee
Commission	Name
President	Shema Ngonga Fabrice
Vice President	Habyarimana Marcel
Commissioner of Women's Football	Munyankaka Ancille
Commissioner of Competitions	Turatsinze Amani Evariste
Commissioner of Finance	Rugambwa Jean Marie
Commissioner of Marketing and Sponsorship	Rwakunda Quinta
Commissioner of Technical Matters and Football Development	Habimana Hamdan
Head Coach (men's national team)	Stephane Constantine
