= List of Kenya women's international footballers =

This is a non-exhaustive list of Kenya women's international footballers – association football players who have appeared at least once for the senior Kenya women's national football team.

Key
**Bold**	Named to the national team in the past year

Name	Caps	Goals	National team years	Club(s)	Ref.
Mercy Achieng	2	0	2016	(Kenya) Thika Queens	
Wendy Achieng	3	0	2016		
**Mwanalima Adam**	2	5		(Kenya) Thika Queens	
Lilian Adera					
Stella Ahono				(Kenya) Zetech Sparks	
Mercy Airo				(Kenya) Kisumu All Starlets	
Esse Akida	3	1	2016	(Greece) PAOK	
Samantha Akinyi				(Kenya) Makolander Ladies FC	
Vivian Akinyi					
**Lucy Akoth**	1	0		(Kenya) Mathare United	
**Lydia Akoth**	2	1		(Kenya) Thika Queens	
Ann Aluoch					
Rosemary Aluoch					
Elizabeth Ambogo					
**Sheril Angachi**	1	0		(Kenya) Gaspo Youth	
Carolyne Anyango					
Doris Anyango					
**Mercyline Anyango**	2	0		(Kenya) Vihiga Queens	
Purity Anyetu					
**Neddy Atieno**	2	6		(Kenya) Ulinzi	
Cheris Avilia					
**Lilian Awuor**	1	0		(France) Soyaux	
**Janet Bundi**	3	1		(Kenya) Vihiga Queens	
Sharon Bushenei					
Terry Ouko					
**Vivian Corazone**	5	0		(Kenya) Gaspo Youth	
**Terry Engesha**	2	0		(Kenya) Vihiga Queens	
Ruth Ingosi				(Cyprus) Lakatamia	
Wincate Kaari				(Kenya) Thika Queens	
Mary Kinuthia					
**Annette Kundu**	1	0			
Sylvia Lumasia				(Kenya) Kibera Girls Soccer Academy	
Sylvia Makungu					
**Enez Mango**	1	0		(Kenya) Vihiga Queens	
**Rachael Muema**	1	0		(Kenya) Thika Queens	
Doreen Nabwire					
Christine Nafula				(Kenya) Vihiga Queens	
**Vivian Nasaka**	1	0		(Kenya) Vihiga Queens	
**Lorna Nyarinda**	1	0		(Kenya) Vihiga Queens	
Jacky Ogol					
Irene Ogutu					
**Phoeby Okech**	2	0		(Kenya) Vihiga Queens	
Judith Osimbo				(Kenya) Gaspo Youth	
**Nelly Sawe**				(Kenya) Thika Queens	
**Jentrix Shikangwa**	1	5		(Kenya) Vihiga Queens	
Dorcas Sikobe				(Cyprus) Lakatamia	
Cynthia Shilwatso				(Spain) DUX Logroño B	
Dorcas Shiveka				(Kenya) Thika Queens	
Topister Situma				(Kenya) Vihiga Queens	
Elizabeth Wambui				(Kenya) Gaspo Youth	
**Merceline Wayodi**	1	0		(Kenya) Vihiga Queens	

== See also ==
- Kenya women's national football team
