= Cape Verdean Women's Championship =

- Founded: 2010; 16 years ago
- Country: Cape Verde
- Confederation: CAF
- Number of clubs: 12
- Relegation to: W-Championship D2
- International cup: CAF W-Champions League
- Current champions: Seven Stars (7th title) (2023-24)
- Most championships: Seven Stars (7 titles)
- Current: 2025–26 W-Championship

The Cape Verdean Women's National Championship (Portuguese: Campeonato Nacional Feminino Caboverdiano) is the top flight of women's association football in Cape Verde. The competition is run by the Cape Verdean Football Federation.

== History ==
The first Cape Verdean women's regional championships started on 2003. The first national championship on 2011.

== Champions ==
The list of champions and runners-up:

Year	Champions	Runners-up
2010–11	Fundação EPIF (Praia)	Fundação EPIF (Mindelo)
2011–12	Fundação EPIF (Praia)	Fundação EPIF (Mindelo)
2012–13	Seven Stars	CS Mindelense
2013–14	Seven Stars	Sporting Brava
2014–15	Seven Stars	SC Santa Maria
2015–16	Seven Stars	AJ Black Panthers
2016–17	cancelled due to financial reasons	
2017–18	Llana FC	CS Mindelense
2018–19	Seven Stars	Llana FC
2019–20	abandoned because of the COVID-19 pandemic in Cape Verde	
2020–21	abandoned because of the COVID-19 pandemic in Cape Verde	
2021–22	Llana Futebol Clube	Academia do Desporto, Educação e Cultura(ADEK)
2022–23	Seven Stars	Llana FC
2023–24	Seven Stars	Black Panthers

== Most successful clubs ==
Rank	Club	Champions	Runners-up	Winning seasons	Runners-up seasons
1	Seven Stars	6	0	2013, 2014, 2015, 2016, 2019,2023	
2	Llana FC	2	2	2018,2022	2019,2023
3	Fundação EPIF (Praia)	2	0	2011, 2012	
4	Fundação EPIF (Mindelo)	0	2		2011, 2012
4	CS Mindelense	0	2		2013, 2018
6	Sporting Brava	0	1		2014
6	SC Santa Maria	0	1		2015
6	AJ Black Panthers	0	1		2016
6	Academia do Desporto, Educação e Cultura(ADEK)	0	1		2022
