= Rwanda Women's Football League =

Rwanda Women's First Division League
- Founded: 2008
- Country: Rwanda
- Confederation: CAF
- International cup: CAF W-Champions League
- Current champions: AS Kigali WFC (12th) (2022-23)
- Most championships: AS Kigali WFC (12th)
- Top scorer: (Rwanda) Shadia Uwamahirwe (104 goal)
- Current: 2025–26

The Rwanda Women's First Division League is the top level women's association football league in Rwanda.

== History ==
Before the league 2004-2008...

League started in 2008 and is founded solely by money from FIFA. Introduction of play-offs after the season for the 2013–14 season. With just sixteen registered clubs, there is no relegation, but the creation of a second level league is planned. In 2015 FIFA sponsored the league with $70,000.

== Champions ==
The list of champions and runners-up:

Year	Champions	Runners-up
2008	APR FC	Musanze
2009	AS Kigali WFC	APR
2010	AS Kigali WFC	APR
2011	AS Kigali WFC	APR
2012	AS Kigali WFC	APR
2013	AS Kigali WFC	The Winners
2014	AS Kigali WFC	Kamonyi
2015	AS Kigali WFC	
2016	AS Kigali WFC	
2017	AS Kigali WFC	
2018	AS Kigali WFC	
2019	Scandinavia WFC	
2020	Abandoned	
2021–22	AS Kigali WFC	APAER WFC (Mulindi)
2022–23	AS Kigali WFC	
2023–24	Rayon Sports WFC	

== Top scorers ==
Season	Player	Team	Goals
2009	(Rwanda) Aimée Tuyizere	APR	16
2009–10	(Rwanda) Mefya Hakizimana	Kigali	25
2010–11	(Rwanda) Shadia Uwamahirwe	Kigali	24
2011–12	(Rwanda) Shadia Uwamahirwe	Kigali	37
2013	(Rwanda) Shadia Uwamahirwe	Kigali	20
2017	(Rwanda) Calixte Iradukunda	Kigali	22
2022–23	(Rwanda) Jeannette Ukwinkunda	Rayon Sport	14

Most time top scorer

- 3 times.
  - Shadia Uwamahirwe (2010–11, 2011–12 and 2013)

Most goals scored by a player in a single season

- 37 goals.
  - Shadia Uwamahirwe (2011–12)
