= Vihiga Queens F.C. =

Association football women's club

- Full name: Vihiga Queens Football Club
- Founded: December 2013; 12 years ago
- Ground: Kenya
- Chairman & CEO: Michael Senelwa Ogada
- Head coach: Boniface Nyamunyamu
- League: Kenyan Women's Premier League
- 2020–21: Kenyan Women's Premier League semi-final playoff

Vihiga Queens Football Club is a Kenyan professional women's association football club based in Mbale, Vihiga County that competes in Kenyan Women's Premier League, the top tier of Kenyan women's football. The club is officially affiliated to the Football Kenya Federation.

The club has won the Premier League title on three consecutive occasions from 2017 to 2019. The team won the national league in 2019. In 2021, they were selected as the representative for Kenya at the CECAFA qualifiers which won by beating Ethiopian team CBE by 2–1 in the finals and qualified them to the inaugural 2021 CAF Women's Champions League.

== Honours ==
=== Domestic ===
League titles

- Kenyan Women's Premier League

Winners (record) (3): 2017, 2018, 2019

=== Continental ===
- CECAFA-CAF Women's Champions League Qualifiers

Winners (1): 2021

== Managerial history ==
- (Kenya) Alex Alumirah (2013–August 2021)
- (Kenya) Charles Okere (August 2021–November 2021)
- (Kenya) Boniface Nyamunyamu (December 2021–)

== See also ==
- Vihiga United
- Kenyan Women's Premier League
- Enez Mango
