= Kenyan Women's Premier League =

Football league

- Founded: 2010
- Country: Kenya
- Confederation: CAF
- Number of clubs: 15
- Level on pyramid: 1
- Relegation to: Division One
- International cup: CAF W-Champions League
- Current champions: Vihiga Queens (2022)
- Current: 2025–26

The Kenyan Women's Premier League is the top tier women's football league in the Kenyan football league system. It is controlled by the Football Kenya Federation.

== History ==
The first women's football league in Kenya has been created in 1985. In 2010 no league was running any more because of financial problems. UNICEF and the Kenyan government then sponsored the new league. In 2013 the sponsorship was ended, leaving the league unfinished mid-season. In 2014, the league was named FKF Girls' Premier League.

== Champions ==
list of champions

- 2010: MYSA Ladies
- 2011: Unknown
- 2012: Matuu
- 2013: season aborted
- 2014: Oserian (FKF Girls Premier League 2014)
- 2014–15: Thika Queens
- 2016–17: Thika Queens (FKF Women Premier League)
- 2017: Vihiga Queens (FKF Women Premier League)
- 2018: Vihiga Queens
- 2019: Vihiga Queens
- 2020–21: Thika Queens
- 2021–22: Vihiga Queens
- 2022–23: Vihiga Queens

== Top goalscorers ==
Season	Player	Team	Goals
2020-21	(Kenya) Mwanalima Adam	Thika Queens	23
2023-24	(Kenya) Tumaini Waliaula		16
2024-25	(Kenya) Rebeca Akwaro	Police Bullets	16
