= Football Kenya Federation =

Governing body of association football in Kenya

CAF
- Founded: 1932
- FIFA affiliation: 1960
- CAF affiliation: 1961
- CECAFA affiliation: 1973
- President: Hussein Mohammed
- Vice-President: McDonald Mariga
- General Secretary: Harold Ndege
- Website: footballkenya.org

The Football Kenya Federation (abbreviated as Football Kenya or FKF) is the governing body of football in Kenya. The FKF organizes the Kenyan Premier League, the Kenyan Women's Premier League, FKF Division One, FKF Women Division One and Kenya national football teams. It is headed by Hussein Mohammed.

== History ==
The Federation was founded in 1960 (current association) as a FIFA affiliation, in 1961 it was a CAF affiliation, and later it was a CECAFA affiliation in 1973.

In November 2011, Football Kenya Limited (FKL) was disbanded as it wanted to cease being a limited company. The Football Kenya Federation (FKF) replaced FKL, but most of the new executive positions were retained by their former occupants on FKL.

== FKF ==
FKF was headed by Sam Nyamweya between 2011 and 2015. During this time Nyamweya was heavily linked to embezzlement of federation funds. This period in Kenyan football has been seen by the Kenyan public as a dark time, with money often being unavailable for use by the national team. This extended to internationally based players such as Victor Wanyama often having to pay for their own flights to and from international matches.

In April 2016, the ladies national team, the Harambee Starlets qualified for their first-ever AFCON set to be hosted in Cameroon in 2016.

In June 2016, FKF moved its offices to FIFA goal project at Kasarani stadium.

FKF and betting company SportPesa signed a 5-year partnership in June 2016.

In October 2023, the FKF announced an investment scheme that would see funding directed into upskilling and training physiotherapists in the Kenyan women's leagues.

== Suspension ==
In November 2022, FIFA lifted the suspension against the Kenya Football Federation (FKF), following the local government's decision to reinstate the body after disbanding it over suspicions of corruption.
