= List of football clubs in Mongolia =

Following is a list of football clubs located in Mongolia, sorted alphabetically.

- Anduud City FC (Ulaanbaatar)
- Arvis FC (Ulaanbaatar)
- Athletic 220 FC (Ulaanbaatar)
- BCH Lions (Ulaanbaatar)
- Bavarians FC (Ulaanbaatar)
- Brera Ilch FC (Ulaanbaatar)
- Deren FC (Deren, Dundgovi)
- Erchim FC (Ulaanbaatar)
- FC Ulaanbaatar (Ulaanbaatar)
- FC Sumida-Gepro (Ulaanbaatar)
- JustJohn Alliance FC (Ulaanbaatar)
- Hunters FC (Ulaanbaatar)
- Khangarid (Erdenet)
- Khaan Khuns-Erchim FC (Ulaanbaatar)
- Khasiin Khulguud FC (Ulaanbaatar)
- Khoromkhon (Ulaanbaatar)
- Khovdyn Khuleguud FC (Khovd)
- Selenge Press (Ulaanbaatar)
- New Mongol Bayangol FC (Ulaanbaatar)
- Soyombiin Baarsuud FC (Ulaanbaatar)
- SP Falcons (Ulaanbaatar)
- Sumida-Gepro FC (Ulaanbaatar)
- Tuv Azarganuud FC (Töv)
- Ulaanbaatar University (Ulaanbaatar)
- Ulaanbaataryn Mazaalaynuud (Ulaanbaatar)
- Ulaanbaataryn Unaganuud (Ulaanbaatar)
