= Mongolia women's national football team =

Women's national association football team representing Mongolia

Mongolia
- Nickname: Blue Wolves (Хөх чононууд)
- Association: Mongolian Football Federation
- Confederation: AFC (Asia)
- Sub-confederation: EAFF (East Asia)
- Head coach: Sandagdorjiin Erdenebat
- Captain: Orogdol Tsasan-Okhin
- Most caps: Orogdol Tsasan-Okhin; Altansukh Altantuya (19)
- Top scorer: Narmandakh Namuunaa (4)
- FIFA code: MNG
| First colours | Second colours |

FIFA ranking
- Current: 146 (16 June 2026)
- Highest: 115 (December 2018)
- Lowest: 146 (April – June 2026)

First international
- Mongolia 3–2 Northern Mariana Islands (Ulaanbaatar, Mongolia; 3 September 2018)

Biggest win
- Mongolia 3–2 Northern Mariana Islands (Ulaanbaatar, Mongolia; 3 September 2018); Mongolia 1–0 Guam (Ulaanbaatar, Mongolia; 5 September 2018)

Biggest defeat
- North Korea 19–0 Mongolia (Zhuhai, China; 2 December 2023)

The Mongolia women's national football team (Mongolian: Монголын хөлбөмбөгийн эмэгтэйчүүдийн шигшээ баг) represents Mongolia in international women's association football. the team is governed by Mongolian Football Federation (MFF) and competes in AFC and EAFF women's competitions. the Mongolian team's first activity was in 2018 when they entered for the first time the preliminary round of 2019 EAFF Women's E-1 Football Championship.

== History ==
=== Beginning ===
With women's association football starting to flourish in Asia and especially in East Asia. The Mongolian Football Federation announced new policies to improve the women's game in the country, the federation appointed the Japanese coach Iki Yoji to support women's football development. Later in 2016, the Japanese coach was reappointed as coach of the U-16 girls' team in which within one year period, the team debuted internationally by participating in category C of the East Asian U-16 girls competition in 2017. History was made as the Mongolian team managed to score their first goal internationally and win their first match since debuting. The MFF had initial plans to debut the senior team in the 2017 EAFF E-1 Football Championship, however, they withdrew before the preliminary round started.

In 2018 the EAFF announced that Mongolia will be hosting the 2019 EAFF E-1 Football Championship Preliminary Round, Mongolia started its international football journey led by their coach Ganbold Tsedevsuren with a win against Northern Mariana Islands in which they came from behind of two-goal, to win the match three goals to two in front of a home crowd with an estimated 421 attendance with Narmandakh Namuunaa scoring Mongolia's first goal. In their second match against Guam the Mongolian have beat the odds with an impressive one-nil win, with 6 points Mongolia led the table. The third matchday saw Mongolia and Macau play to a scoreless draw in their last match. History was made as Mongolia advanced to the second preliminary round winning the first round undefeated.

In October 2018, the Mongolian federation announced its participation in the 2020 AFC Women's Olympic Qualifying Tournament to be the first major tournament outside of East Asia. the team was drawn to face Tajikistan the host and the Philippines, Singapore and Chinese Taipei.

== Results and fixtures ==
The following is a list of match results in the last 12 months, as well as any future matches that have been scheduled.

Legend

Win Draw Lose Fixture

== Coaching staff ==
=== Current coaching staff ===
As of 17 September 2021

| Position | Name |
|---|---|
| Head coach | (Mongolia) Sandagdorjiin Erdenebat |
| Assistant coach | Davaalkhagva Erdene-Ochir |
| Assistant coach | Munkhtuya Enkhtuy |
| Assistant coach | Shinebayar Enkhbayar |
| Medical Officer | (Mongolia) Purevbaatar Davaajav |
| Doctor | Sarangerel Nachinbaatar |
| Team manager | Enkhchimeg Jargalsaikhan |

=== Manager history ===
| Name | Period | Matches | Wins | Draws | Losses | Winning % | Notes | Ref. |
|---|---|---|---|---|---|---|---|---|
| (Mongolia) Ganbold Tsedevsuren (Цэдэвсүрэн Ганболд) | 2018 | 10 | 2 | 2 | 6 | 20% | | |
| (Japan) Naoko Kawamoto (Наоко Кавамото) | 2019 | 0 | 0 | 0 | 0 | 0% | | |
| (Mongolia) Sandagdorjiin Erdenebat (Сандагдоржийн Эрдэнэбат) | 2021– | 6 | 0 | 1 | 5 | 0% | | |

== Players ==
=== Current squad ===
- The following players were called up for the 2026 AFC Women's Asian Cup qualification.
- Match dates: June 23 July 5 2025
- Opposition: India and Iraq and Thailand and Timor-Leste

Caps and goals correct as of July 5, 2025, after the match against Timor Leste

| No. | Pos. | Player | Date of birth (age) | Caps | Goals | Club |
|---|---|---|---|---|---|---|
| 1 | GK | Erdenebileg Tsendjav (Цэнджав) | 5 May 2002 (age 24) | 13 | 0 | (Mongolian Football Federation) Western FC |
| 20 | GK | Munkhbaatar Ijilmurun (Ижилмөрөн) | 28 November 2005 (age 20) | 0 | 0 | (Mongolian Football Federation) FC Kharaatsai |
| 21 | GK | Tumurbat Zambaga (Замбага) | 2 May 2008 (age 18) | 0 | 0 | (Mongolian Football Federation) FC Kharaatsai |
| 3 | DF | Munkh-Erdene Khuslen (Хүслэн) | 1 April 2005 (age 21) | 4 | 0 | (Mongolian Football Federation) Western |
| 4 | DF | Enkhbat Baigalmaa (Байгалмаа) | 27 December 2000 (age 25) | 3 | 0 | (Mongolian Football Federation) Khad FC |
| 5 | DF | Bayarsaikhan Namuun (Намуун) | 18 November 1991 (age 34) | 12 | 2 | (Mongolian Football Federation) Western |
| 7 | DF | Orogdol Tsasan-Okhin (Цасан-Охин) (captain) | 21 September 1997 (age 29) | 16 | 1 | (Mongolian Football Federation) Bayanzürkh Sporting Ilch FC |
| 8 | DF | Altansukh Altantuya (Алтантуяа) | 29 September 1996 (age 30) | 16 | 0 | (Mongolian Football Federation) Western |
| 13 | DF | Khishigtsengel Amanda (Аманда) | 28 November 2004 (age 21) | 3 | 0 | (Mongolian Football Federation) FC Kharaatsai |
| 14 | DF | Sukhbat Enerel (Энэрэл) | 19 June 2007 (age 19) | 1 | 0 | (Mongolian Football Federation) FC Kharaatsai |
| 15 | DF | Enkhbayar Azzaya (Аззая) | 13 November 2004 (age 21) | 0 | 0 | (Mongolian Football Federation) FC Kharaatsai |
| 2 | MF | Uuriinbayar Solongo (Ү. Солонго) | 28 November 2003 (age 22) | 1 | 0 | (Mongolian Football Federation) Khad FC |
| 6 | MF | Munkhgarid Khaliut (Халиут) | 9 July 2008 (age 18) | 3 | 0 | (Mongolian Football Federation) FC Kharaatsai |
| 12 | MF | Tulgabadrakh Enkhjin (Энхжин) | 29 September 2000 (age 26) | 5 | 0 | (Mongolian Football Federation) Khad FC |
| 16 | MF | Bayarmagnai Nandin-Erdene (Нандин-Эрдэнэ) | 16 January 2005 (age 21) | 2 | 0 | (Mongolian Football Federation) FC Kharaatsai |
| 18 | MF | Chinbaatar Solongo (Ч. Солонго) | 14 August 2003 (age 23) | 5 | 0 | (Lao Football Federation) Master 7 |
| 19 | MF | Sarangerel Zolzaya (Золзаяа) | 25 February 2006 (age 20) | 4 | 0 | (Mongolian Football Federation) FC Kharaatsai |
| 9 | FW | Ulziibayar Undrakh (Ундрах) | 20 July 1998 (age 28) | 10 | 1 | (Mongolian Football Federation) Bayanzürkh Sporting Ilch FC |
| 11 | FW | Narmandakh Namuunaa (Намуунаа) | 12 August 1999 (age 27) | 15 | 4 | (Mongolian Football Federation) Storm |
| 17 | FW | Enkhbaatar Enkhmargad (Энхмаргад) | 20 March 2003 (age 23) | 8 | 0 | (Mongolian Football Federation) Storm |

=== Recent call-ups ===
The following players have been called up to the squad in the past 12 months.

| Pos. | Player | Date of birth (age) | Caps | Goals | Club | Latest call-up |

== Records ==
As of 25 September 2023

*Players in bold are still active, at least at club level.

=== Most capped players ===
| # | Player | Year(s) | Caps | Goals |
|---|---|---|---|---|
| 1 | Tsasan-Okhin Orogdol | 2018–present | 16 | 1 |
| 1 | Altantuya Altansukh | 2018–present | 16 | 0 |
| 3 | Narmandakh Namuunaa | 2018–present | 15 | 4 |
| 4 | Erdenebileg Tsendjav | 2018–present | 13 | 0 |
| 5 | Tuvshinjargal Undral | 2018–present | 12 | 1 |
| 5 | Bayarsaikhan Namuun | 2018–present | 12 | 1 |
| 5 | Ser-od Udval | 2018–present | 12 | 0 |
| 8 | Ulziibayar Badamkhatan | 2018–present | 11 | 0 |
| 9 | Ulziibayar Undrakh | 2018–present | 9 | 1 |
| 10 | Nergui Dashdulam | 2018–present | 9 | 0 |
| 10 | Nyamsuren Delgerzaya | 2018–present | 9 | 0 |

=== Top goalscorers ===
As of 7 April 2023

| # | Player | Year(s) | Goals | Caps |
|---|---|---|---|---|
| 1 | Narmandakh Namuunaa | 2018–present | 4 | 13 |
| 2 | Tsolmon Ganchimeg | 2018–present | 1 | 5 |
| 2 | Otgonbaatar Sarangarav | 2018–present | 1 | 8 |
| 2 | Tsasan-Okhin Orogdol | 2018–present | 1 | 14 |
| 2 | Namuun Bayarsaikhan | 2018–present | 1 | 10 |
| 2 | Tuvshinjargal Undral | 2018–present | 1 | 12 |
| 2 | Undrakh Ulziibayar | 2018–present | 1 | 9 |

== Competitive record ==
=== FIFA Women's World Cup ===
FIFA Women's World Cup record
| Year | Round | Position | Pld | W | D* | L | GS | GA |
|---|---|---|---|---|---|---|---|---|
| (China) 1991 | Did not exist | | | | | | | |
| (Sweden) 1995 | Did not exist | | | | | | | |
| (United States) 1999 | Did not enter | | | | | | | |
| (United States) 2003 | Did not enter | | | | | | | |
| (China) 2007 | Did not enter | | | | | | | |
| (Germany) 2011 | Did not enter | | | | | | | |
| (Canada) 2015 | Did not enter | | | | | | | |
| (France) 2019 | Did not enter | | | | | | | |
| (Australia) (New Zealand) 2023 | Did not qualify | | | | | | | |
| (Brazil) 2027 | Did not qualify | | | | | | | |
| (Costa Rica) (Jamaica) (Mexico) (United States) 2031 | To be determined | | | | | | | |
| (United Kingdom) 2035 | To be determined | | | | | | | |
| Appearances | 0/12 | – | – | – | – | – | – | – |

*Draws include knockout matches decided on penalty kicks.

=== Olympic Games ===
| Summer Olympics record | | | | | | | | | | Qualification record | | | | | | |
| Year | Round | Position | Pld | W | D* | L | GS | GA | GD | Pld | W | D* | L | GS | GA | GD |
|---|---|---|---|---|---|---|---|---|---|---|---|---|---|---|---|---|
| (United States) 1996 | Did not enter | | | | | | | | | Did not enter | | | | | | |
| (Australia) 2000 | Did not enter | | | | | | | | | Did not enter | | | | | | |
| (Greece) 2004 | Did not enter | | | | | | | | | Did not enter | | | | | | |
| (China) 2008 | Did not enter | | | | | | | | | Did not enter | | | | | | |
| (United Kingdom) 2012 | Did not enter | | | | | | | | | Did not enter | | | | | | |
| (Brazil) 2016 | Did not enter | | | | | | | | | Did not enter | | | | | | |
| (Japan) 2020 | Did not qualify | | | | | | | | | 4 | 0 | 1 | 3 | 4 | 20 | −16 |
| (France) 2024 | Did not qualify | | | | | | | | | 2 | 0 | 1 | 1 | 2 | 8 | −6 |
| (United States) 2028 | Did not qualify | | | | | | | | | | | | | | | |
| (Australia) 2032 | To be determined | | | | | | | | | To be determined | | | | | | |
| Appearances | 0/7 | – | – | – | – | – | – | – | – | 6 | 0 | 2 | 4 | 6 | 28 | −22 |

*Draws include knockout matches decided on penalty kicks.

=== AFC Women's Asian Cup ===
| AFC Women's Asian Cup record | | | | | | | | | | Qualification record | | | | | | |
| Year | Round | Position | Pld | W | D* | L | GS | GA | GD | Pld | W | D* | L | GS | GA | GD |
|---|---|---|---|---|---|---|---|---|---|---|---|---|---|---|---|---|
| (Hong Kong) 1975 | Did not exist | | | | | | | | | Did not exist | | | | | | |
| (Taiwan) 1977 | Did not exist | | | | | | | | | Did not exist | | | | | | |
| (India) 1980 | Did not exist | | | | | | | | | Did not exist | | | | | | |
| (Hong Kong) 1981 | Did not exist | | | | | | | | | Did not exist | | | | | | |
| (Thailand) 1983 | Did not exist | | | | | | | | | Did not exist | | | | | | |
| (Hong Kong) 1986 | Did not exist | | | | | | | | | Did not exist | | | | | | |
| (Hong Kong) 1989 | Did not exist | | | | | | | | | Did not exist | | | | | | |
| (Japan) 1991 | Did not exist | | | | | | | | | Did not exist | | | | | | |
| (Malaysia) 1993 | Did not exist | | | | | | | | | Did not exist | | | | | | |
| (Malaysia) 1995 | Did not exist | | | | | | | | | Did not exist | | | | | | |
| (China) 1997 | Did not exist | | | | | | | | | Did not exist | | | | | | |
| (Philippines) 1999 | Did not enter | | | | | | | | | Did not enter | | | | | | |
| (Chinese Taipei) 2001 | Did not enter | | | | | | | | | Did not enter | | | | | | |
| (Thailand) 2003 | Did not enter | | | | | | | | | Did not enter | | | | | | |
| (Australia) 2006 | Did not enter | | | | | | | | | Did not enter | | | | | | |
| (Vietnam) 2008 | Did not enter | | | | | | | | | Did not enter | | | | | | |
| (China) 2010 | Did not enter | | | | | | | | | Did not enter | | | | | | |
| (Vietnam) 2014 | Did not enter | | | | | | | | | Did not enter | | | | | | |
| (Jordan) 2018 | Did not enter | | | | | | | | | Did not enter | | | | | | |
| (India) 2022 | Did not qualify | | | | | | | | | 2 | 0 | 0 | 2 | 0 | 24 | −24 |
| (Australia) 2026 | Did not qualify | | | | | | | | | 4 | 0 | 0 | 4 | 3 | 32 | -29 |
| (Uzbekistan) 2029 | To be determined | | | | | | | | | | | | | | | |
| Appearances | 0/20 | – | – | – | – | – | – | – | – | 6 | 0 | 0 | 6 | 3 | 56 | −53 |

*Draws include knockout matches decided on penalty kicks.

=== EAFF E-1 Football Championship ===
EAFF E-1 Football Championship record
| Year | Round | Position | Pld | W | D* | L | GS | GA |
|---|---|---|---|---|---|---|---|---|
| (South Korea) 2005 | did not enter | | | | | | | |
| (China) 2008 | did not enter | | | | | | | |
| (Japan) 2010 | did not enter | | | | | | | |
| (South Korea) 2013 | did not enter | | | | | | | |
| (China) 2015 | did not enter | | | | | | | |
| (Japan) 2017 | Withdrew | | | | | | | |
| (South Korea) 2019 | did not qualify | | | | | | | |
| (Japan) 2022 | did not enter | | | | | | | |
| (South Korea) 2025 | did not qualify | | | | | | | |
| (China) 2028 | did not enter | | | | | | | |
| (Japan) 2030 | to be determined | | | | | | | |
| Appearances | 0/8 | – | – | – | – | – | – | – |

*Draws include knockout matches decided on penalty kicks.

=== Asian Games ===
Asian Games record
| Year | Round | Position | Pld | W | D* | L | GS | GA |
|---|---|---|---|---|---|---|---|---|
| (China) 1990 | did not exist | | | | | | | |
| (Japan) 1994 | did not exist | | | | | | | |
| (Thailand) 1998 | did not enter | | | | | | | |
| (South Korea) 2002 | did not enter | | | | | | | |
| (Qatar) 2006 | did not enter | | | | | | | |
| (China) 2010 | did not enter | | | | | | | |
| (South Korea) 2014 | did not enter | | | | | | | |
| (Indonesia) 2018 | did not enter | | | | | | | |
| (China) 2022 | Group stage | 15th | 2 | 0 | 0 | 2 | 0 | 22 |
| (Japan) 2026 | did not enter | | | | | | | |
(Qatar) 2030
(Saudi Arabia) 2034
| Appearances | 1/9 | 15th | 2 | 0 | 0 | 2 | 0 | 22 |

*Draws include knockout matches decided on penalty kicks.

== Head-to-head record ==
As of 5 July 2025, after the match against Timor Leste
Key

Positive balance (more wins than losses)
Neutral balance (as many wins as losses)
Negative balance (more losses than wins)

The following table shows Mongolia' all-time official international record per opponent:

| Opponent | Pld | W | D | L | GF | GA | GD | W% | Confederation |
|---|---|---|---|---|---|---|---|---|---|
| China | 2 | 0 | 0 | 2 | 0 | 26 | −26 | 00.00 | AFC |
| Chinese Taipei | 2 | 0 | 0 | 2 | 0 | 15 | −15 | 00.00 | AFC |
| Guam | 1 | 1 | 0 | 0 | 1 | 0 | +1 | 100.00 | AFC |
| Hong Kong | 2 | 0 | 0 | 2 | 0 | 6 | −6 | 00.00 | AFC |
| Macau | 1 | 0 | 1 | 0 | 0 | 0 | 0 | 00.00 | AFC |
| Northern Mariana Islands | 2 | 1 | 0 | 1 | 6 | 6 | -6 | 100.00 | AFC |
| Philippines | 1 | 0 | 0 | 1 | 1 | 5 | −4 | 00.00 | AFC |
| Singapore | 2 | 0 | 2 | 0 | 4 | 4 | 0 | 00.00 | AFC |
| South Korea | 1 | 0 | 0 | 1 | 0 | 12 | −12 | 00.00 | AFC |
| Tajikistan | 1 | 0 | 0 | 1 | 1 | 4 | −3 | 100.00 | AFC |
| Thailand | 1 | 0 | 0 | 1 | 0 | 6 | −6 | 100.00 | AFC |
| Timor-Leste | 1 | 0 | 0 | 1 | 1 | 3 | -3 | 00.00 | AFC |
| Uzbekistan | 2 | 0 | 0 | 2 | 0 | 18 | −18 | 00.00 | AFC |
| North Korea | 1 | 0 | 0 | 1 | 0 | 19 | −19 | 00.00 | AFC |
| India | 1 | 0 | 0 | 1 | 0 | 13 | -13 | 00.00 | AFC |
| Iraq | 1 | 0 | 0 | 1 | 2 | 5 | -5 | 00.00 | AFC |
| Total | 16 | 2 | 3 | 11 | 10 | 95 | −85 | 12.50 | — |

== See also ==
- Sport in Mongolia
  - Football in Mongolia
    - Women's football in Mongolia
- Mongolia men's national football team
