= List of foreign footballers in Mongolia =

This is a list of non-Mongolian footballers who currently play or have played association football in Mongolia.

== Armenia ==
- Davit Ghandilyan - Deren FC

== Brazil ==
- Ernani - Erchim FC
- Ruan Felipe Chiquini da Silva - Khangarid FC, Ulaanbaatar club

== Cameroon ==
- Emmanuel Mbia - Khoromkhon FC

== Canada ==
- Ryan Fante - Khoromkhon FC, Ulaanbaataryn Unaganuud FC

== England ==
- Dean O' Brian - Bayangol FC

== France ==
- Nicolas Vandelli - Erchim FC

== Georgia (Georgia (country)) ==
- Zviad Tsikolia - Erchim FC

== Guam ==
- Jonahan Romero - Khoromkhon FC

== Italy ==
- Mauro Boerchio - Ulaanbaatar City FC
- Giacomo Ratto - Ulaanbaatar City FC
- Federico Zini - Ulaanbaatar City FC
- Rosario Mattia Russo - SP Falcons

== Ivory Coast ==
- Arthur Kouassi - Ulaanbaatar City FC

== Japan ==
- Tatsuya Sase - Goyo FC
- Yudai Ikeda - Khoromkhon FC
- Eisuke Mohri - Athletic 220 FC
- Shori Murata - Athletic 220 FC
- Ryota Ishikawa - Erchim FC
- Ishino Shuta - Erchim FC
- Shuta Ishino - Erchim FC
- Yosuke Minami - Erchim FC, FC Ulaanbaatar
- Seita Ishikawa - Bayangol FC
- Kazutaka Otsu - FC Ulaanbaatar
- Chikara Tashiro - Erchim FC, Athletic 220 FC
- Tatsuya Nishio - Khoromkhon FC, Deren FC
- Mizuho Sasaki - Selenge Press FC, Ulaanbaatar FC, Deren FC
- Shinya Yamamoto - Selenge Press FC
- Mizuho Sasaki - Selenge Press FC
- Ogino Masahiro - FC Ulaanbaatar
- Taku Hishida - Selenge Press FC
- Tomoya Kashiwagi - FC Ulaanbaatar
- Keita Tanabe - Deren FC
- Maru Matsuki - Erchim FC
- Norito Hashiguchi - Athletic 220 FC
- Dan Ito - Erchim FC

== Morocco ==
- Ghassane El Barhami - Ulaanbaatar City FC

== Nigeria ==
- Olawale Sunday - Bayangol FC
- Ayo Hassan Raimi - Khoromkhon FC
- Michael Adeyemo - Khoromkhon FC
- Samson Amowodu - Khoromkhon FC
- Paul Chukwu Ebuka - Khangarid FC
- Adiwale Hope Nifemy

== North Korea ==
- Kim Myong-won - FC Ulaanbaatar

== Senegal ==
- Mamadou Baldé - Arvis FC

== Russia ==
- Dordzhi Sangadzhiyev - Erchim FC - 2018-
- Ilya Kungurov - Ulaanbaatar City FC
- Alim Zumakulov (Алим Зумакулов) - Selenge Press FC
- Vladimir Ulydyakov (Владимир Ульдяков) - Khangarid FC
- Artyom Sergeyvich - Ulaanbaatar City FC
- Aleksey Nikolayevich - Ulaanbaatar City FC
- Islam Hamhoev - Ulaanbaatar City FC

== Serbia ==
- Nikola Đuričić - Erchim FC
- Miloš Perišić - Erchim FC, FC Ulaanbaatar
- Milan Sredojević - Erchim FC
- Zoran Pešić - Erchim FC
- Aleksandar Marinković - Deren FC
- Miloš Rnić

== Singapore ==
- David Low - Khoromkhon FC

== Slovenia ==
- Uroš Poljanec - Khoromkhon FC

== Spain ==
- Adrian Rubio Garcia - Bayangol FC
- Jorge Garcia Vidal - Ulaanbaatar City FC

== Trinidad and Tobago ==
- Seon Power - Ulaanbaatar City FC
- Akil Pompey - Khoromkhon FC

== United States ==
- Zak Downes - Bayangol FC
- Austin Rogers - Bayangol FC, FC Ulaanbaatar
- Max Lubin - Erchim FC
- Noah Parker
- Nigel Robinson (Pierre) - Khoromkhon FC
- John Walrath - (Selenge Press FC)
- Sean Vinberg - Khoromkhon FC
- Khris Hammock - Khoromkhon FC
- Christopher Scirto - Khoromkhon FC
