= List of Mongolia women's international footballers =

The Mongolia women's national football team (Mongolian: Монголын хөлбөмбөгийн эмэгтэйчүүдийн шигшээ баг) represents Mongolia in international women's association football. It is governed by the Mongolian Football Federation (MFF), the governing body of football in Mongolia, and competes as a member of the Asian Football Confederation.

The team played its first FIFA-sanctioned official international match on September 3, 2018, against Northern Mariana Islands women's national football team as a part of 2019 EAFF E-1 Football Championship First preliminary round.

== List of players ==
Note: Players are listed by the number of caps, then the number of goals scored. Players are listed alphabetically if the number of goals is equal.

- This list features FIFA-sanctioned matches only.

Key
§	Player is active in international football and was called up to the team in last 12 months
§	Player haven't been called up in last 12 months, but is still available for selection

Player	Caps	Goals	First cap	Last cap	Ref
Erdenebileg Tsendjav	16	0	v. Northern Mariana Islands, 2018	v. Hong Kong, 2023	
Nyamsuren Delgerzaya	9	0	v. Northern Mariana Islands, 2018	v. Hong Kong, 2018	
Altansukh Altantuya	19	0	v. Northern Mariana Islands, 2018	v. Hong Kong, 2023	
Ulziibayar Badamkhatan	14	0	v. Northern Mariana Islands, 2018	v. Hong Kong, 2023	
Bayarsaikhan Namuun	15	2	v. Northern Mariana Islands, 2018	v. North Korea, 2023	
Orogdol Tsasan-Okhin	19	2	v. Northern Mariana Islands, 2018	v. North Korea, 2023	
Otgonbaatar Sarangarav	8	1	v. Northern Mariana Islands, 2018	v. South Korea, 2021	
Ser-Od Udval	12	0	v. Northern Mariana Islands, 2018	v. Thailand, 2023	
Enkhbaatar Enkhmargad	8	0	v. Northern Mariana Islands, 2018	v. Uzbekistan, 2023	
Tuvshinjargal Undral	12	1	v. Northern Mariana Islands, 2018	v. Uzbekistan, 2021	
Nergui Dashdulam	9	0	v. Northern Mariana Islands, 2018	v. Hong Kong, 2018	
Narmandakh Namuunaa	18	4	v. Northern Mariana Islands, 2018	v. Hong Kong, 2023	
Tsolmon Ganchimeg	4	1	v. Northern Mariana Islands, 2018	v. Uzbekistan, 2021	
Khuslenzaya Erdenebat	2	0	v. Northern Mariana Islands, 2018	v. Macau, 2018	
Damjindorg Tugsjargal	8	0	v. Guam, 2018	v. Hong Kong, 2018	
Ganbayar Ganchimeg	1	0	v. Macau, 2018	v. Macau, 2018	
Solongo Gandansuren	2	0	v. Macau, 2018	v. Singapore, 2018	
Ulziibayar Undrakh	10	1	v. Tajikistan, 2018	v. Uzbekistan, 2023	
Nomin Enkhbayar	7	0	v. Tajikistan, 2018	v. Hong Kong, 2018	
Munkhzul Byambatsetseg	5	0	v. Singapore, 2018	v. Thailand, 2023	
Enkh-Amgalan Tumendelger	3	0	v. Chinese Taipei, 2018	v. South Korea, 2021	
Tsagaantsooj Enkhjin	2	0	v. Chinese Taipei, 2018	v. Philippines, 2018	
Batbaatar Saruul	5	0	v. Chinese Taipei, 2018	v. Northern Mariana Islands, 2023	
Gantumur Temuulen	2	0	v. Chinese Taipei, 2018	v. Hong Kong, 2018	
Nomindari Munkhtsetseg	2	0	v. South Korea, 2021	v. Uzbekistan, 2021	
Enkhzaya Boldbaatar	4	0	v. South Korea, 2021	v. Hong Kong, 2023	
Purevdorj Nergui	4	0	v. South Korea, 2021	v. Thailand, 2023	
Tulgabadrakh Enkhjin	5	0	v. South Korea, 2021	v. Uzbekistan, 2023	
Munkhbat Irmunzaya	2	0	v. South Korea, 2021	v. Uzbekistan, 2021	
Chinbaatar Solongo	5	0	v. Uzbekistan, 2021	v. Uzbekistan, 2023	
Munkh-Erdene Khuslen	7	0	v. Singapore, 2023	v. Hong Kong, 2023	
Enkhbayar Enkhnamuun	2	0	v. Singapore, 2023	v. Thailand, 2023	
Solongo Uuriinbayar	2	0	v. Singapore, 2023	v. North Korea, 2023	
Zolzaya Sarangerel	4	0	v. Singapore, 2023	v. Uzbekistan, 2023	
Khaliut Munkhgarid	6	0	v. Singapore, 2023	v. Hong Kong, 2023	
Baigalmaa Enkhbat	6	0	v. Thailand, 2023	v. Hong Kong, 2023	
Amanda Khishigtsengel	6	0	v. Thailand, 2023	v. Hong Kong, 2023	
Ankhtuya Enkhbold	2	0	v. China, 2023	v. Uzbekistan, 2023	
Sukhbat Enerel	1	0	v. China, 2023	v. China, 2023	
Nandin-Erdene Bayarmagnai	2	0	v. China, 2023	v. Uzbekistan, 2023	
Enkhzul Batjargal	3	1	v. Northern Mariana Islands, 2023	v. Hong Kong, 2023	
Ariunzaya Khanidkhuu	2	0	v. Northern Mariana Islands, 2023	v. Hong Kong, 2023	
Khulangoo Munkhjargal	3	0	v. Northern Mariana Islands, 2023	v. Hong Kong, 2023	
Myagmarsuren Battsoodol	1	0	v. North Korea, 2023	v. North Korea, 2023	
Oyun-Erdene Bayaraa	1	0	v. Hong Kong, 2023	v. Hong Kong, 2023	
Zambaga Tumurbat	1	0	v. Hong Kong, 2023	v. Hong Kong, 2023	

== See also ==
- Mongolia women's national football team
- Current squad
