= Irvesuud FC =

Football club in Ulaanbaatar, Mongolia

Irvesuud Ирвэсүүд
- Nickname(s): The Leopards
- Founded: 2021; 4 years ago
- Ground: Khan-Uul Stadium, Ulaanbaatar
- Capacity: 500
- Manager: Chinbat
- League: Mongolia First League
- 2024–25: MFL, 3rd

Irvesuud Football Club (Mongolian: Ирвэсүүд FC; English: Leopards FC) is a Mongolian professional football club currently competing in the Mongolia Second League.

== History ==
The club was founded in 2021 and competed in the National Amateur Cup that season. After topping its group, Irvesuud FC advanced to the final before ultimately losing to Kapitron FC on penalties. The club received automatic promotion to the Mongolia Second League.

They narrowly missed top-three finish during its first campaign in the Second League. However, in 2023–24, they finished as runners-up in the league and defeated DMU FC in a promotion/relegation series to earn promotion to the First League for the first time.

== Domestic history ==
Key

Champion Runners-up 3rd place

Season	League							Domestic Cup	Notes
Season	Div.	Pos.	Pl.	W	D	L	P	Domestic Cup	Notes
2021/22	4th	2nd	6	5	0	1	15	3rd Round	Promoted to Mongolia Second League
2022/23	3rd	4th	18	8	4	6	28	1st Round	
2023/24	3rd	2nd	14	10	1	3	31	1st Round	Promoted to the Mongolian First League
2024/25	2nd	3rd	21	13	3	4	45		
2025/26	2nd								
