= Ulaangom City FC =

Association football club in Mongolia

Ulaangom City Улаангом Сити
- Full name: Ulaangom City Football Club
- Short name: UCFC
- Founded: 2018; 8 years ago
- Ground: Ulaangom City Stadium
- Capacity: 3,000
- Manager: Buyankhishig Purevjav
- League: Mongolian Premier League
- 2025–26: 8th
Home colours	Away colours

Ulaangom City Football Club (Mongolian: Улаангом Сити ФК) is a Mongolian professional football club from Ulaangom, Uvs Province, currently competing in the Mongolian Premier League.

== History ==
Ulaangom City was founded in 2018. In 2023, the club led by manager Buyankhishig Purevjav, won the National Amateur Cup and earned the right to compete in the Mongolia Second League. After topping its group, the club defeated Khökh Zapuus FC 1–0 in the final to win the tournament. The club featured the tournament's top scorer, midfielder and defender that season.

The club won its first two matches in the Second League, with victories over Irvesuud FC and Tuuliin Tom Tunuud FC. On 16 September 2023, the club competed in its first-ever MFF Cup tournament. The match resulted in a 4–1 victory over UB Mazaalai. That season, the club won its second-consecutive league title and earned promotion to the First League. Two Ulaangom City players also took home individual awards, J. Dashnyam as the league's best goalkeeper and E. Amarsaana as the best defender.

The team finished as runners up in the Mongolia First League in its first season. The club qualified for a promotion/relegation play-off series against Tuv Azarganuud FC but ultimately lost, missing out on a place in the Mongolia Premier League for the 2025–26 season. Just prior to the season, Erchim FC refused its place in the Premier League because of disputes with the Mongolian Football Federation. Ulaangom City was given Erchim's place in the top tier league.

== Domestic history ==
Key

Champion Runners-up 3rd place

Season	League							Domestic cup	Notes
Season	Div.	Pos.	Pl.	W	D	L	P	Domestic cup	Notes
2022/2023	4th	1st	6	6	0	0	N/A		Promoted to Second League
2023/2024	3rd	1st	14	12	1	1	25		Promoted to First League
2024/2025	2nd	2nd	13	9	3	1			Awarded spot in Mongolia Premier League
2025/2026	1st	8th	20	3	2	15	11		
