= 2015 Mongolian First League =

Football tournament season in Mongolia

Tournament details
- Country: Mongolia
- Dates: 2015
- Teams: 10

Final positions
- Champions: Continental FC
- Runners-up: Khangarid City
- All statistics correct as of 21-04-21.

2015 Mongolian First League (often referred to as the 2015 Mongolian 1st League) was the first edition of Mongolian First League equivalent to the second level in the Mongolia league hierarchy.

== Participating teams ==
- ARD Daatgal FC
- Arvis FC
- Baganuur KhK
- Bayangol FC
- Continental FC
- DMYu FC
- Khangarid City
- Metro FC
- Mongolian Dream
- Şaryn Gol FC

== Promoted Teams ==
With 8 wins and 1 draw Continental FC and Khangarid City finished the competition tied. Continental were denied promotion for failing to meet coaching requirements. As a result, the Khangarid City and Bayangol FC teams were promoted to Mongolian Premier League next season.

The Continental FC team ended up ending its activities. And Khangarid City sold their Premier League license 2016 to Ulaanbaatar City and competed in 2016 as Beşiktaş.

== Final classification ==
1.Continental                  9   8  0  1         24
2.Khangarid City               9   8  0  1         24  Promoted

3.Bayangol FC                  9   7  0  2         21  Promoted
4.Şaryn Gol                    9   7  0  2         21
5.ARD Daatgal                  9   5  0  4         15
6.Arvis FC                     9   3  1  5         10
7.Baganuur KhK                 9   2  2  5          8
8.Metro FC                     9   2  1  6          7
9.Mongolian Dream              9   1  0  8          3
10.DMYu  FC                    9   0  0  9          0
