= Khan-Uul Club =

Association football club in Mongolia

- Ground: Khan-Uul Stadium
- Capacity: 500
- League: Mongolia Second League

Khan-Uul Club is a Mongolian football club, competing in the Mongolian First League.

== Futsal ==
In addition to field football, in which the team played for Mongolia First League in the 2020 season and ended up being relegated to Mongolia Second League, the club also maintains a futsal team and disputes, in 2020, the Mongolian Futsal Premier League.
