= Narmandakh Namuunaa =

Mongolian footballer

Personal information
- Full name: Narmandakh Namuunaa; Нармандах Намуунаа
- Date of birth: 12 August 1999 (age 27)
- Place of birth: Darkhan, Mongolia
- Position: Striker

Senior career*
Years	Team	Apps	(Gls)
2014–2015	Darkhan City		
2016–2017	Erchim		
2017–2018	Khad		
2019–2020	Arvis		
2021	Khökh Chononuud		
2022–2023	Storm	18	(18)
2024–2026	Khovd Western		

International career^{‡}
2022–2026	Mongolia	18	(4)
- * Club domestic league appearances and goals as of 12 April 2025 ‡ National team caps and goals as of 12 April 2025 (UTC)

Narmandakh Namuunaa (Mongolian: Нармандах Намуунаа; born 12 August 1999) is a Mongolian footballer who last played as a forward for Women's National Football League club Khovd Western and the Mongolian women's national team. With four goals she is the top scorer of the national team. On 6 May 2026, she was issued a five-year ban from all footballing activities by the AFC for attempted match-fixing during qualifying for the 2025–26 AFC Women's Champions League.

== Club career ==
Namuunaa began her career with Arvis FC of the Women's National Football League. In 2019 she scored two goals against New Yarmag Club in Arvis FC's opening match of the season, an eventual 11–0 victory. She went on to lead the team to an undefeated season and its third league title in the competition's five years of existence. She received the award of the league's best midfielder for her performances.

In 2022 Namuunaa joined the newly formed Storm FC. In its first season in the National League, the club had an undefeated season as it claimed the championship. Namuunaa was the league's top scorer with eighteen goals in as many matches. Following the season she was named the Female Player of the Year at the Mongolian Football Federation's annual Golden Ball Awards. She battled through injury on route to earning the honour.

For the 2024/2025 season, Namuunaa moved to Khovd Western. The club won the league that season and qualified to represent Mongolia in the 2025–26 AFC Women's Champions League. The club finished third in its group with one win in three matches. In May 2026, it was announced that Namuunaa had been found guilty of attempting to fix a match in favor of Khovd Western's opponent during qualifying. As a result, the Asian Football Confederation imposed a five-year ban from all footballing activity on the player.

== International career ==
In September 2018 Namuunaa was named to the Mongolian women's senior national team squad for its first-ever match, a 2019 EAFF E-1 Football Championship contest against the Northern Mariana Islands. She went on to score two goals in the eventual victory, including the team's first-ever goal and game-winner. The following month she was a member of the Mongolian team that competed in qualification for the 2020 Summer Olympics.

In September 2021, Namuunaa took part in both of Mongolia's matches in 2022 AFC Women's Asian Cup qualification matches, including defeats to South Korea and Uzbekistan. She scored both of Mongolia's goals in a 2–2 draw with Singapore in the 2024 AFC Women's Olympic Qualifying Tournament in April 2023.

=== International goals ===
Scores and results list Mongolia's goal tally first.

No.	Date	Venue	Opponent	Score	Result	Competition
1.	3 September 2018	MFF Football Centre, Ulaanbaatar, Mongolia	Northern Mariana Islands	1–2	3–2	2019 EAFF E-1 Football Championship
2.	3 September 2018	MFF Football Centre, Ulaanbaatar, Mongolia	Northern Mariana Islands	3–2	3–2	2019 EAFF E-1 Football Championship
3.	4 April 2023	Chonburi Stadium, Chonburi, Thailand	Singapore	1–0	2–2	2024 AFC Women's Olympic Qualifying Tournament
4.	4 April 2023	Chonburi Stadium, Chonburi, Thailand	Singapore	2–2	2–2	2024 AFC Women's Olympic Qualifying Tournament
Last updated 4 April 2023

=== International career statistics ===
As of match played 20 September 2021

Mongolia
Year	Apps	Goals
2018	9	2
2019	0	0
2020	0	0
2021	2	0
Total	11	2

== Honours ==
As of 15 February 2023

=== Individual ===
- Best Striker: 2017, 2022
- Best Midfielder: 2018
- MFF Golden Ball (Best Female Player): 2022
