= Tsolmon Ganchimeg =

Mongolian footballer

Personal information
- Full name: Tsolmon Ganchimeg; Ганчимэг Цолмон
- Date of birth: 31 May 2003 (age 23)
- Place of birth: Mörön, Mongolia
- Position: Midfielder

Team information
- Current team: Kharaatsai
- Number: 22

Senior career*
Years	Team	Apps	(Gls)
2016–2021	Arvis		
2022–	Kharaatsai		

International career^{‡}
2018	Mongolia U16	4	(2)
2018	Mongolia U19	3	(0)
2018–	Mongolia	4	(1)
- * Club domestic league appearances and goals as of 14:41, 20 February 2023 (UTC) ‡ National team caps and goals as of 14:41, 20 February 2023 (UTC)

Tsolmon Ganchimeg (Mongolian: Ганчимэг Цолмон; born 31 May 2003) is a Mongolian footballer who plays for Women's National Football League club FC Kharaatsai and the Mongolian women's national team.

== Club career ==
Ganchimeg played football in the school league for the first time in 2015. Shortly thereafter she was spotted by the coach of the under-16 national team Iki Yoji and included in a training camp held in Japan. She won the Women's National Football League with Arvis FC in 2016 and 2017. In 2017 she was named the league's best midfielder and also won the under-16 league with the club.

At the end of 2019, while still with Arvis FC, Ganchimeg was again a finalist for the best female player at the Golden Ball awards. The honour ultimately went to Deren FC captain O. Tsasan-Okhin.

For the 2022 season, Ganchimeg moved to FC Kharaatsai. She was again named best midfielder in the league as her club finished in second place.

== International career ==
Ganchimeg was part of Mongolia's squad that participated in the 2017 EAFF U-15 Girls Tournament. She went on to score against Guam on 18 April for an eventual 1–1 draw. Ganchimeg's goal was the first official tally by any Mongolian women's national team since forming and helped secure the first-ever point. Two days later the team earned the first official victory, a 2–0 result over the Northern Marianas Islands. Ganchimeg served as the team's captain in the tournament.

In September 2018 Ganchimeg was again called up to the national U16 team for 2019 AFC U-16 Women's Championship qualification. She scored in Mongolia's 8–0 victory over Pakistan to open their campaign. On the next matchday she scored again in a 1–2 defeat to Hong Kong. The following month, she was part of the national under-19 side that competed in 2019 AFC U-19 Women's Championship qualification. The side played a friendly against Australia in preparation for the tournament.

Ganchimeg was part of the first-ever senior women's national squad that was assembled for the 2019 EAFF E-1 Football Championship. She went on to score her first senior international goal in the team's first match, a 3–2 victory over the Northern Mariana Islands.

=== International goals ===
Scores and results list Mongolia's goal tally first.

No.	Date	Venue	Opponent	Score	Result	Competition
1.	3 September 2018	MFF Football Centre, Ulaanbaatar, Mongolia	Northern Mariana Islands	2–2	3–2	2019 EAFF E-1 Football Championship
Last updated 20 February 2023

=== International career statistics ===
As of match played 20 September 2021

Mongolia
Year	Apps	Goals
2018	2	1
2020	0	0
2021	2	0
Total	4	1

=== Youth international goals ===
Scores and results list Mongolia's goal tally first.

No.	Date	Venue	Opponent	Score	Result	Competition
1.	18 April 2017	Jinshan Sports Centre, Shanghai, China	Guam U15	1–0	1–1	2017 EAFF U-15 Girls Tournament
2.	15 September 2018	MFF Football Centre, Ulaanbaatar, Mongolia	Pakistan U16	4–0	8–0	2019 AFC U-16 Women's Championship qualification
3.	17 September 2018	MFF Football Centre, Ulaanbaatar, Mongolia	Hong Kong U16	1–2	1–2	2019 AFC U-16 Women's Championship qualification
Last updated 20 February 2023

== Honours ==
Individual

- MFF Golden Ball (Best Female Player):
  - 2017 (Winner)
  - 2019 (Finalist)
- League Best Midfielder: 2017, 2022

Club

- WNFL
  - Winner: 2016, 2017, 2019
  - Runner up: 2021, 2022
