= Football in Mongolia =

- Country: Mongolia
- Governing body: Mongolian Football Federation (MFF)
- National teams: men's national team women's national team national futsal team
- Nicknames: Хөх Чононууд (Khökh Chononuud) (Blue Wolves)
- First played: 1960s

Club competitions
- Mongolian Premier League; Mongolia 1st League; Mongolia 2nd League; MFF Cup; National Amateur Cup; Super Cup; Women's National Football League; National Futsal League

International competitions
- AFC Cup; AFC Asian Cup; FIFA World Cup; FIFA Women's World Cup; Women's Asian Cup; EAFF E-1 Football Championship; EAFF E-1 Football Championship (women); AFC Futsal Club Championship; AFC Futsal Championship; FIFA Futsal World Cup

The sport of football in the country of Mongolia is run by the Mongolian Football Federation. The association administers the national football team as well as the Niislel League. Football is the second sport of Mongolia, after wrestling. Approximately 30% of the people in Mongolia are considered association football fans.

== League system ==
Level	League(s)/Division(s)
1	Niislel League; 10 clubs
2	Mongolia 1st League
3	Mongolia 2nd League
4	National Amateur Cup (Mongolia)

== Football stadiums in Mongolia ==
Stadium	City	Capacity	Tenants	Image
National Sports Stadium	Ulaanbaatar	12,500	Mongolia national football team	
MFF Football Centre Stadium	Ulaanbaatar	5,000		

== Most successful clubs overall ==
As of 6 July 2026

local and lower league organizations are not included.

Club	Domestic Titles				
Club	Mongolian Premier League	MFF Cup	MFF Super Cup	Borgio Cup	Total
Erchim	**13**	**8**	**9**	**2**	**32**
Tengeriin Bugnuud	9	-	-	-	9
Khangarid	4	1	-	**2**	7
Ulaanbaatar	3	1	1	-	5
Aldar	4	-	-	-	4
Khudulmur	4	-	-	-	4
Selenge Press Falcons	2	1	1	-	4
Khoromkhon	2	1	-	1	4
Khuch	3	-	-	-	3
Athletic 220	2	1	-	-	3
Ulaanbaatar City	1	1	1	-	3
Ulaanbaataryn Unaganuud	1	-	-	**2**	3
Idsskh	2	-	-	-	2
Sükhbataar	2	-	-	-	2
Darkhan-Uul	1	1	-	-	2
Delger	1	1	-	-	2
Khasiin Khulguud	1	-	-	1	2
Mon-Uran	-	2	-	-	2
Deren	-	-	2	-	2
Ajilchin	1	-	-	-	1
ITI Bank-Bars	1	-	-	-	1
Nairamdal	1	-	-	-	1
Sor	1	-	-	-	1
Soyol	1	-	-	-	1
Udriin-Od	1	-	-	-	1
Zamchin	1	-	-	-	1
Tuv Azarganuud	-	1	-	-	1

- The articles in italic indicate the defunct leagues and the defunct cups.
- The figures in **bold** indicate the most times this competition has been won by a team.

== Attendances ==
The average attendance per top-flight football league season and the club with the highest average attendance:

Season	League average	Best club	Best club average
2024-25	154	Erchim	403

Source: League page on Wikipedia

== See also ==
- Lists of stadiums
