= Pohnpei Premier League =

- Founded: 2009
- Country: Federated States of Micronesia
- Number of clubs: 4
- Level on pyramid: 1
- Current champions: Island Pitbulls (8th title) (2022)
- Most championships: Island Pitbulls (8 titles)

Pohnpei Premier League is the top flight football league in Pohnpei, Federated States of Micronesia, established in 2009.

== History ==
In 2009, English journalist Paul Watson and his friend Matthew Conrad established the Pohnpei Premier League, which had its first season from October to December of that year.

During that season, there were five clubs, including the Pitbulls, the SDA, International FC, C.O.M.-FSM FC, and the Island Warriors. The Island Pitbulls competed in shirts donated by English side Yeovil Town, and originated from the College of Micronesia and church groups. The Pitbulls won both the pre-season Liberation Games, as well as the final "showdown" match of the league against SDA, with a score of 5–2.

The best players from the league were then offered the chance to train to be in the Pohnpei national team. In October 2010, Pohnpei won its first football victory in history against a second division club team in Guam.
