= Sündorj Janchiv =

Mongolian footballer

Personal information
- Full name: Janchiviin Sündorj; Жанчивийн Сүндорж
- Date of birth: 16 August 1994 (age 32)
- Place of birth: Mongolia
- Position: Midfielder

Team information
- Current team: Erdenes Ilch

Senior career*
Years	Team	Apps	(Gls)
2014–2017	Erchim		
2017–2018	Ulaanbaatar City		
2018–2019	Ulaanbaatar		
2019–2022	Khangarid		
2022–	Erdenes Ilch		

International career^{‡}
2016–	Mongolia	18	(1)
- * Club domestic league appearances and goals as of 16 June 2019 ‡ National team caps and goals as of 01:39, 5 July 2023 (UTC)

Sündorj Janchiv (Mongolian: Жанчивийн Сүндорж; born 16 August 1994) is a Mongolian footballer who plays as a midfielder for Mongolian Premier League club Erdenes Ilch and the Mongolian national team.

== Club career ==
Following the 2018 season, Janchiv was named to the Mongolian Premier League’s Best XI. In 2023 he was the top scorer in the Mongolian First League with over 35 goals for Erdenes Ilch FC. That season the club won the title and was promoted to the Mongolia Premier League for the first time.

== International career ==
Janchiv was part of the Mongolian squad for 2016 AFC U-23 Championship qualification. He made his senior international debut on 2 July 2016 in a 2017 EAFF E-1 Football Championship match against Chinese Taipei.

=== International goals ===
Score and result list Mongolia's goal tally first.

#	Date	Venue	Opponent	Score	Result	Competition
1	2 September 2018	MFF Football Centre, Ulaanbaatar, Mongolia	Macau	2–0	4–1	2019 EAFF E-1 Football Championship qualification
Last updated 4 July 2023

=== International statistics ===
As of match played 10 October 2019

Mongolia
Year	Apps	Goals
2016	5	0
2017	1	0
2018	9	1
2019	3	0
Total	18	1
