= Brera Ilch FC =

Association football club in Mongolia

Brera Ilch
- Full name: Brera Ilch Football Club
- Short name: BIFC
- Founded: 2020; 6 years ago
- Dissolved: 2026; 0 years ago
- Ground: MFF Football Centre, Ulaanbaatar
- Capacity: 5,000
- Owner: Brera Holdings
- Manager: Toshiaki Imai
- League: Mongolian First League
- 2024–25: Mongolian Premier League, 10th (relegated)
- Website: https://www.breraholdings.com/

Brera Ilch Football Club was a Mongolian professional football club that last competed in the Mongolian Premier League for the 2024–25 season. Its women's team competed in the Women's National Football League.

== History ==
The club was founded in 2020 as Ilch FC. That year it finished second in the National Amateur Cup behind Khad FC and earned promotion to the Second League. For the 2021 season the club won its second consecutive promotion and the right to compete in the First League in 2022. The club won the First League championship in the 2022/2023 season and earned the right to compete in the Mongolian Premier League for the first time for the 2023/24 season. The club's midfielder Sündorj Janchiv won the league golden boot that season with over 35 goals. Entering its first season in the Premier League, the club once again changed its name, this time from Erdenes Ilch FC to Bayanzürkh Sporting Ilch FC.

In August 2023, it was announced that the club had signed a letter of intent to be purchased by Brera Holdings and join the Brera family of clubs, which included Brera Calcio of Italy, Brera Strumica of North Macedonia, and Mozambique's Brera Tchumene FC. The deal was expected to be finalized by March 2024 following the 2023–24 season's winter break. Ilch FC would become the group's first club in Asia. The deal was finalized in October 2023 with the club immediately rebranding to Brera Ilch FC.

It was announced in September 2025 that Brera Holdings would pivot away from sports club ownership to cryptocurrency under the name Solmate with the organization continuing to operate Brera's existing clubs. However, when the First League kicked off its 2025/2026 season, the club did not compete in the league. In March 2026, Solmate announced it was selling Brera Ilch and Brera Tchumene FC to free up assets for its new venture. The clubs were described at the time as "underperforming soccer teams" by the firm.

== Domestic history ==
Key

Champion Runners-up 3rd Place

Season	League							Domestic cup	Notes
Season	Div.	Pos.	Pl.	W	D	L	P	Domestic cup	Notes
2020	4th	2nd	-	-	-	-	-		Promoted to 2nd League
2021	3rd	1st	12	11	1	0	34		Promoted to 1st League
2021/22	2nd	7th	18	6	3	9	21		
2022/23	2nd	1st	18	17	0	1	51		Promoted to Premier League
2023/24	1st	8th	27	8	0	19	24		
2024/25	1st	10th	27	4	4	19	16		Relegated to 1st League
2025/26	2nd								
