= Maximiliano Martínez =

Maximiliano Martínez may refer to:

- Maximiliano Martínez (footballer, born 1979), Argentine forward
- Maximiliano Martínez (footballer, born June 1992), Argentine midfielder
- Maximiliano Martínez (footballer, born September 1992), Argentine defender
- Maximiliano Martínez (rower); see Argentina at the 2007 Pan American Games
- Maximiliano Hernández Martínez, President of El Salvador (1931–1934, 1935–1944)
