= Women's National Football League (Mongolia) =

Association football league in Mongolia

Women's National Football League Эмэгтэйчүүдийн Үндэсний Лиг
- Founded: 2015; 11 years ago
- Country: Mongolia
- Confederation: Asian Football Confederation
- Number of clubs: 7 (2026)
- Level on pyramid: 1
- International cup: AFC Women's Champions League
- Current champions: Kharaatsai (2026)
- Most championships: Arvis (3 titles)

The Women's National Football League (Mongolian: Эмэгтэйчүүдийн Үндэсний Лиг) is the top-flight women's football league in Mongolia.

== History ==
In an effort to organize a women's national team for Mongolia, the Mongolian Football Federation (MFF) signed a memorandum of agreement with their Japanese counterparts. To encourage participation of Mongolian women in football, the MFF organized the first edition of the Women's National Football League tournament in July 2015.

The first season which ran from 21 to 29 July 2015 was contested by eight teams. Khad FC was the winner of the inaugural edition which won over all the other seven teams in the competition. The club scored 22 goals and conceded two goals during the whole season. Mongoliin Temuulel FC won the silver medal.

Arvis F.C. were the winners of the second season which was held in 2016. They won again in the third edition which was contested by nine clubs around mid-2017. Deren FC and Mongolian Temuulen were the second and third placers respectively.

In 2020, the International Federation of Association Football (FIFA) provided $500,000 USD to the team to help grow its leagues.

== Champions ==
As of 2026

Season	Champions	Runners-up
2015	Khad	Mongoliin Temuulel
2016	Arvis	
2017	Arvis	Deren
2018	Deren	
2019	Arvis	Deren
2020	Deren	Tuuliin Tom Tunuud
2021	UBC FC	Arvis
2022	Storm	Kharaatsai
2023	Kharaatsai	Ilch
2024	Khovd Western	Kharaatsai
2025	Not held	
2026	Kharaatsai	Ulaangom City

=== Championships by team ===
As of 2026 season

Team	Championships
Arvis	3
Deren	2
Kharaatsai	2
Khad	1
UBC FC	1
Storm	1
Khovd Western	1

== Goalscorers ==
Season	Player	Team	Goals
2015	(Mongolia) Undrakh Ulziibayar	Khan-Uul	12
2019	(Mongolia) Undrakh Ulziibayar	Arvis	18
2021	(Mongolia) Undrakh Ulziibayar	Arvis	25
2022	(Mongolia) Narmandakh Namuunaa	Storm	18
2023	(Mongolia) Ankhtuta Enkhbold	Kharaatsai	13
2023	(Mongolia) M. Zolzaya	Kharaatsai	13
2024	(Mongolia) Ankhtuya Enkhbold	Kharaatsai	10
2026	(China) O. Uyakhan	Khad	24

== Continental record ==
The following is a list of results by league clubs in international competition.

Scores list the Mongolian club's goal tally first.

Club	Season	Competition	Round	Opponent	Home	Away	Aggregate
(Mongolia) Khovd Western	2025–26	AFC Women's Champions League	Preliminary Stage	(Philippines) Stallion Laguna	1–6		
(Mongolia) Khovd Western	2025–26	AFC Women's Champions League	Preliminary Stage	(Myanmar) I.S.P.E	0–8		
(Mongolia) Khovd Western	2025–26	AFC Women's Champions League	Preliminary Stage	Bank of Guam Strykers	5–2		
(Mongolia) Kharaatsai	2026–27	AFC Women's Champions League	Group Stage	(North Korea) April 25	0–13		
(Mongolia) Kharaatsai	2026–27	AFC Women's Champions League	Group Stage	(Thailand) BGC–College of Asian Scholars	0–15		
(Mongolia) Kharaatsai	2026–27	AFC Women's Champions League	Group Stage	(Timor-Leste) S'Amuser	0–3		

== See also ==
- AFC Women's Club Championship
