= 2016 Mongolian First League =

Football tournament season in Mongolia

2016 Mongolia First League

Tournament details
- Country: Mongolia
- Dates: 2016
- Teams: 10

Final positions
- Champions: Goyo FC
- Runners-up: Athletic 220 FC
- All statistics correct as of 21-04-21.

2016 Mongolian First League (often referred to as the 2016 Mongolian 1st League) is Second-highest division of the Mongolia.

== Participating teams ==
- Arvis FC
- Athletic 220 FC
- Baganuur KhK
- Beşiktaş
- DMYu FC
- Gepro FC
- Goyo FC
- Şaryn Gol FC
- Soëmbyn Barsuud FC
- Western FC

== Promoted Teams ==
With 16 wins, 1 draw and 6 loss the Goyo FC team added 49 points and finished the competition in first place. With that, in addition to the title of champion of the competition, the team won the right to compete in the Mongolian Premier League next season.

With only seven points less, team Athletic 220 FC finished the competition in second place and was also promoted to the Mongolian Premier League. The team managed to add 42 points with 13 wins, 3 draws and 2 losses.

== Demoted Teams ==
With three wins, and 15 losses, the Baganuur KhK FC team scored just 9 points and was relegated together with the debuting DMYu FC team who had 16 defeats and 2 wins.

== Final classification ==
1.Goyo FC                     18  16  1  1         49  Promoted
2.Athletic 220 FC             18  13  3  2         42  Promoted

3.Soëmbyn Barsuud             18  11  1  6         34  [R]
4.Şaryn Gol                   18  11  0  7         33
5.Arvis                       18   9  2  7              29
6.Beşiktaş                    18   8  2  8         26
7.Western                     18   6  5  7         23
8.Gepro FC                    18   4  0 14         12

9.Baganuur KhK                18   3  0 15          9  Relegated

10.DMYu 18 2 0 16 6 Relegated
