= Mongoliin Temuulel FC =

Association football club in Mongolia

Mongoliin Temuulel
- Full name: Mongoliin Temuulel FC; Монголын Тэмүүлэл
- Ground: MFF Football Centre; Ulaanbaatar
- Capacity: 5000
- League: Mongolia Second League
- 2019: 3rd

Mongoliin Temuulel Football Club (Mongolian: Монголын Тэмүүлэл, English: Mongolian Dream) is a Mongolian sports club that fields male and female sides in association football and futsal.

== History ==
Mongoliin Temuulel won the national youth football championship in 2016, defeating SP Falcons to win the title. The club won the Mongolian Football Federation's state futsal championship in 2017. They beat Bayangol FC 5–1 in the final to win the title. Also in 2017, the football club won the Mandalgovi Open Cup hosted in Mandalgovi. The club beat out eleven other teams, including Soyombiin Baarsuud FC, Darkhan City FC, and FC Sumida, en route to the championship.

In 2019 the senior male football team competed in the inaugural season of the Mongolia Second League. They finished in third place in what was to be their only season in the league.

== Domestic history ==
Key

Champion Runners-up 3rd Place

Season	League							Domestic Cup	Notes
Season	Div.	Pos.	Pl.	W	D	L	P	Domestic Cup	Notes
2019	3rd	3rd	8	5	0	3	15	Round of 16	
