= JustJohn Alliance FC =

Association football club in Mongolia

- Short name: Alliance FC
- Founded: 2019
- Ground: MFF Football Centre
- Capacity: 5,000
- League: Mongolian First League
- 2024–25: 13th
- Website: Website

JustJohn Alliance FC is a Mongolian professional football club currently competing in the Mongolian First League.

== History ==
Alliance ZHR was founded in 2019 by sole investor Ganpürev. The club finished as runners-up in the Mongolian First League for the 2023/2024 season, qualifying the team for a promotion/relegation series with Khovd FC for the a spot in the Mongolian Premier League the following year. Despite earning a 2–2 draw in the second leg, Alliance FC lost 5–3 on aggregate and remained in the First League.

In December 2024, the club signed a partnership with JustJohn FC of Nigeria. A major component of the agreement would focus on player exchanges, including two Nigerian players joining Alliance each season. Shortly thereafter, the club unveiled its new identity and logo as JustJohn Alliance FC.

== Domestic history ==
Season	League							Domestic Cup	Notes
Season	Div.	Pos.	Pl.	W	D	L	P	Domestic Cup	Notes
2020	4th	1st (Group B)	4	2	1	1	7		Promoted to Mongolia Second League
2021	3rd	5th	9	3	1	5	10		
2021/22	3rd	3rd	18	10	3	4	33		Promoted to Mongolian First League
2022/23	2nd	5th	18	5	6	7	21	Round Two	
2023/24	2nd	2nd	18	14	1	3	43	Quarterfinals	
2024/25	2nd	13th	13	3	4	7	13		
