= 2009 Pohnpei Premier League =

Pohnpei Premier League
- Season: 2009
- Champions: Island Pit-Bulls
- Matches: 20
- Goals: 129 (6.45 per match)
- Average goals/game: 6.45
- Top goalscorer: Mateus Barbosa (14 goals)
- Biggest home win: Island Pit-Bulls 9–2 International FC
- Biggest away win: Seventh-day Adventists 9–0 Island Warriors
- Highest scoring: Island Pit-Bulls 9–2 International FC

The 2009 Pohnpei Premier League season was the top division of association football in Pohnpei, Federated States of Micronesia. The competition was held as part of the island's football calendar alongside the Liberation Day Games.

Island Pit-Bulls won the regular season and championship, with Seventh-day Adventists in second place.

It was the inaugural season of the Pohnpei Premier League, set up by Paul Watson.

== League table ==
Pos	Team	Pld	W	D	L	GF	GA	GD	Pts	Qualification
1	Island Pit-Bulls (C)	8	8	0	0	38	9	+29	24	Qualified
2	Seventh-day Adventists	8	4	2	2	34	20	+14	14	Qualified
3	International FC	8	4	2	2	31	27	+4	14	
4	College of Micronesia	8	2	0	6	14	29	−15	6	
5	Island Warriors	8	0	0	8	12	44	−32	0	

Updated to match(es) played on December 2016. Source:
Rules for classification: 1) points; 2) goal difference; 3) number of goals scored.
(C) Champions

== Results ==
Home \ Away	IPB	SDA	INT	COM	IWA
Island Pit-Bulls		7–1	9–2	6–0	3–0
Seventh-day Adventists	1–3		4–4	4–1	9–0
International FC	2–9	4–4		4–2	8–2
College of Micronesia	0–6	1–3	0–3		4–3
Island Warriors	2–3	0–8	3–4	2–5	

Updated to match(es) played on December 2009. Source: RSSSF
Legend: Blue = home team win; Yellow = draw; Red = away team win.

== Championship match ==
10 December 2009

Island Pit-Bulls	5–2	Seventh-day Adventists
Joseph Welson, Benny Lardin, Micah Selikah		Mateus Barbosa; Benny Lardin (o.g.)

PICS Field, Pohnpei

== 3rd place match ==
9 December 2009

College of Micronesia	w/o	International FC

PICS Field, Pohnpei

== Goalscorers ==
Goals	Player	Team
14	(Australia) Mateus Barbosa	Seventh-day Adventists
10	(Federated States of Micronesia) Bob Paul	Island Warriors
9	(Federated States of Micronesia) Ryan Johnson	Island Pit-Bulls
9	(Federated States of Micronesia) Joseph Welson	Island Pit-Bulls
8	(Federated States of Micronesia) (Sri Lanka) Dilshan Senarathgoda	Island Pit-Bulls
8	(Federated States of Micronesia) Tui	International FC
