= Darkhan City FC =

Football club in Mongolia

Darkhan City
- Full name: Darkhan City Football Club
- Founded: 2005
- Ground: My Mongolia Park Stadium, Darkhan
- Capacity: 1,700
- Manager: (Colombia) Pedro Cañizares Ibargüen
- League: Mongolian First League
- 2024/2025: 4th

Darkhan City Football Club (Mongolian: Дархан Хот FC) is a Mongolian sports club based in Darkhan that currently competes in the Mongolian First League.

== History ==
The club was formed in 2005. That season the men's team competed in the Mongolian Premier League, finishing fourth out of the five-team field. They were in the league again for the 2006 season, this time finishing in third place in Group A.

In 2015 Dakhan City participated in the first-ever season of the Women's National Football League.

In 2017 the senior men's football team competed in the Mandalgovi Open Cup hosted in Mandalgovi. The club finished third in the twelve-team competition. Soyombiin Baarsuud FC, Mongoliin Temuulel FC, and FC Sumida also competed in the tournament.

The male futsal club competed in the National First League, the second-tier league, for the 2017/2018 season.

== Stadium ==
Previously the football club's home field was Darkham Central Stadium, home of the city's Nadaam. In October 2022 the team moved into its new stadium, the 1,700-seat My Mongolia Park Stadium.

== Domestic history ==
Season	League							Domestic Cup	Notes
Season	Div.	Pos.	Pl.	W	D	L	P	Domestic Cup	Notes
2023/24	2nd	8th	18	4	3	11	15		
2024/25	2nd	4th	21	14	3	4	45		
2025/26	2nd	7th	8	3	1	4	4		
