= Bavarians FC =

Association football club in Mongolia

- Founded: 2020
- Ground: MFF Football Centre
- Capacity: 5,000
- League: Mongolian First League
- 2024–25: 5th

Bavarians FC is a Mongolian professional football club currently competing in the Mongolian First League.

== History ==
The club was founded in 2020 by fans of the German Bundesliga club FC Bayern Munich. It worked its way up the league system, finishing second in the First League in 2023 and qualifying for the Mongolian Premier League for the first time for the following season.

== Domestic history ==
Season	League							Domestic Cup	Notes
Season	Div.	Pos.	Pl.	W	D	L	P	Domestic Cup	Notes
2020	4th	2nd (Group F)	5	3	0	2	9		Promoted to Mongolia Second League
2021	3rd	4th	12	4	2	6	14		
2021/22	3rd	1st	18	14	3	1	45		Promoted to Mongolian First League
2022/23	2nd	2nd	18	16	1	1	49		Promoted to Mongolian Premier League
2023/24	1st	10th	27	2	1	24	7		Relegated from Mongolian Premier League
2024/25	2nd	5th	21	10	2	9	32		
