= Riley Hoover =

American-born Guamanian footballer

Personal information
- Full name: Riley Catherine Hoover
- Date of birth: 23 January 1998 (age 28)
- Height: 1.70 m (5 ft 7 in)
- Position: Defender

Youth career
- Troy High School

College career
Years	Team	Apps	(Gls)
2016–2020	Cal State Fullerton Titans	10	(0)

International career^{‡}
2016–	Guam	6	(1)
- ‡ National team caps and goals as of 7 September 2018

Riley Catherine Hoover (born 23 January 1998) is an American-born Guamanian footballer who plays as a defender. She has been a member of the Guam women's national team.

== Early life ==
Hoover was raised in Brea, California.

== International goals ==
Scores and results list Guam's goal tally first

No.	Date	Venue	Opponent	Score	Result	Competition
1	3 September 2018	National Stadium, Ulaanbaatar, Mongolia	Macau	4–0	5–0	2019 EAFF E-1 Football Championship

== Personal life ==
Hoover's sister Kaycee is also a Guamanian international footballer.
