= Kaycee Hoover =

American-born Guamanian footballer

Personal information
- Full name: Kaycee Lillian Hoover
- Date of birth: 20 February 1996 (age 30)
- Place of birth: Brea, California, United States
- Height: 1.65 m (5 ft 5 in)
- Positions: Midfielder; defender

College career
Years	Team	Apps	(Gls)
2014–2017	Cal State Fullerton Titans	74	(6)

International career^{‡}
2016–	Guam	7	(2)
- ‡ National team caps and goals as of 7 September 2018

Kaycee Lillian Hoover (born 20 February 1996) is an American-born Guamanian footballer who plays as a midfielder. She has been a member of the Guam women's national team.

== International goals ==
Scores and results list Guam's goal tally first

No.	Date	Venue	Opponent	Score	Result	Competition
1	3 September 2018	National Stadium, Ulaanbaatar, Mongolia	Macau	1–0	5–0	2019 EAFF E-1 Football Championship
2	3 September 2018	National Stadium, Ulaanbaatar, Mongolia	Macau	2–0	5–0	2019 EAFF E-1 Football Championship

== Personal life ==
Hoover's sister Riley is also a Guamanian international footballer.
