= José Belforti =

Argentine footballer

Personal information
- Full name: José María Belforti Rodríguez
- Date of birth: 4 July 1981 (age 45)
- Place of birth: Buenos Aires, Argentina
- Height: 1.80 m (5 ft 11 in)
- Position: Centre-back

Senior career*
Years	Team	Apps	(Gls)
2000–2003	Argentinos Juniors	1	(0)
2003–2004	Brera		
2004–2006	Defensores Belgrano		
2006–2007	Melilla	30	(0)
2007–2008	Lucena	35	(1)
2008–2009	Écija	29	(0)
2009–2010	Cerro Reyes	30	(2)
2010–2013	Lugo	76	(2)
2013–2014	Cádiz	9	(0)
2014	Cacereño	1	(0)
2015–2016	Eldense	22	(0)
2016	Torrevieja	4	(0)
2016–2017	Crevillente	20	(0)
2017–2018	Yeclano	23	(1)
2018–2019	Novelda	21	(1)
Total		301	(7)
- * Club domestic league appearances and goals

José María Belforti Rodríguez (born 4 July 1981) is an Argentine former professional footballer who played as a central defender.

== Club career ==
Born in Buenos Aires, Belforti played in the Argentine Primera División with Argentinos Juniors, also representing in his country Defensores de Belgrano. After a spell in Italy at Brera Calcio in amateur football he moved to Spain in 2006, where he spent the remainder of his career, almost exclusively in the lower leagues.

In the 2011–12 season, Belforti contributed 34 games and one goal (playoffs included) as CD Lugo promoted to the Segunda División for only the second time in its history. He made his debut in the competition on 17 February 2013, playing the full 90 minutes in a 3–0 away loss against SD Huesca.

== Personal life ==
Belforti's twin brother, Martín, was also a footballer. A midfielder, he too played several seasons in Spain.
