= Tuuliin Tom Tunuud FC =

Association football club in Mongolia

Tuuliin Tom Tunuud
- Ground: Khan-Uul Stadium, Ulaanbaatar
- Capacity: 500
- League: Mongolia Second League

Tuuliin Tom Tunuud Football Club is a Mongolian football club currently competing in the Mongolia Second League. As of 2022, the club also fields a women's side that plays in the Women's National Football League, the top tier female league in the country.
