= Arena Civica =

Multi-purpose stadium in Milan, Italy

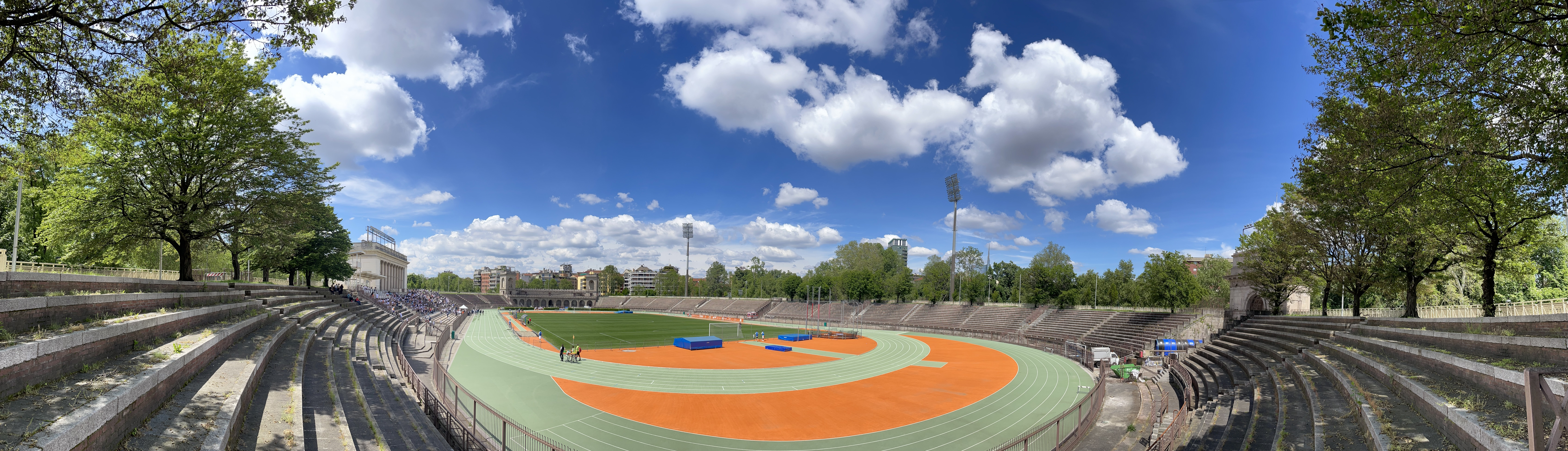
- Arena Civica "Gianni Brera" in Milan: panoramic view from the south end
- Interactive map of Arena Civica
- Former names: Arena del Foro Bonaparte
- Location: Parco Sempione, Milan
- Coordinates: 45°28′33″N 9°10′45″E
- Owner: Comune di Milano (city council)
- Capacity: 10,000

Construction
- Groundbreaking: 1806
- Opened: 18 August 1807
- Renovated: 1945
- Architect: Luigi Canonica

Tenants
- Inter Milan (1930–1947); Milan (1941–1945); Brera FC (2000–present); Inter Women (2023–present)

Arena Civica (Italian pronunciation: [aˈrɛːna ˈtʃiːvika]), officially Arena Gianni Brera, is a multi-purpose stadium in Milan, Italy, which was opened on 18 August 1807. One of the city's main examples of neoclassical architecture, today it mainly hosts football and rugby union games, concerts and cultural events. The stadium can hold 10,000 to 30,000 spectators.

The Arena was the home pitch for Inter Milan from 1930 to 1947 and has been the home of Inter Women since 2023. It is also home to Milan's third football team, Brera, as well as being the host venue for an annual athletics meeting – the Notturna di Milano. Until 2011, the Arena was the home ground of Amatori Rugby Milano, a rugby union club founded in 1927 that won 18 Italian Championships.

== History ==
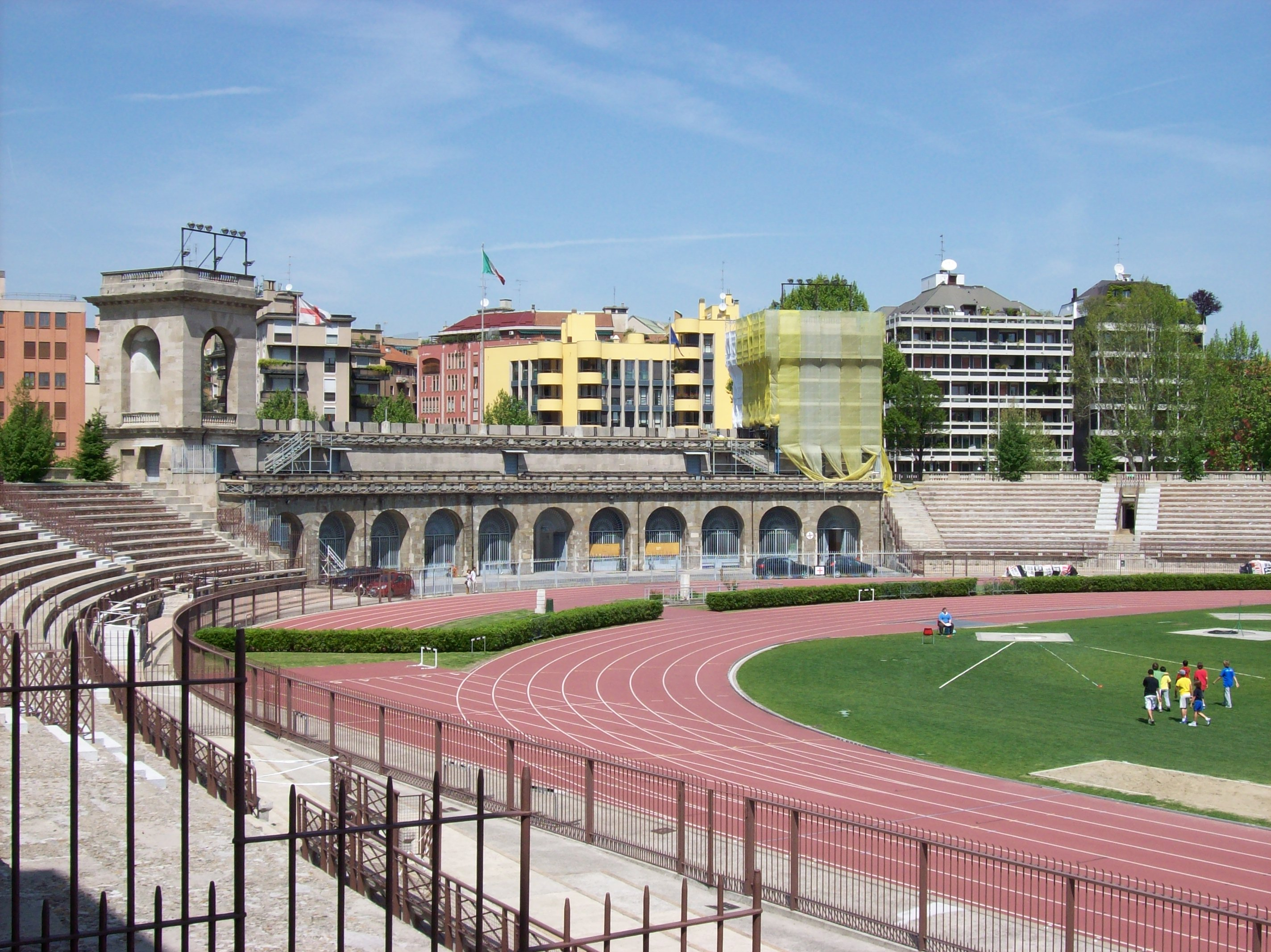
The Arena Civica in 2012

The Arena Civica opened on 18 August 1807, and later it was used for football activities, mainly by Internazionale. Inter first played at the Arena in 1909 and moved into the stadium on a permanent basis in 1930. It shared the grounds with AC Milan in the 1940s; Inter moved to San Siro, the home ground of AC Milan, in 1947. The team returned occasionally for relocated matches, their last being on 10 December 1958 for a Fairs Cup fixture against Lyon. It was also used on 15 May 1910 in the Italy national football team's first official match, a 6–2 victory over France.

During its history it has been used for many kinds of events, including the reconstruction of naval battles; William Frederick Cody ("Buffalo Bill") twice brought his "Wild West Show" here. Other artists who performed at the Arena include Chicago, Joe Cocker, Stewart Copeland, The Cure, Little Feat, Ben Harper, Lenny Kravitz, Lou Reed, The Manhattan Transfer, Robert Plant, Public Image Limited, Radiohead, Patti Smith, Ringo Starr, Rod Stewart, Sting and Andy Summers. The Arena is also the site of the Milan Jazzin' Festival.

In 2003, it was renamed "Arena Gianni Brera" in honor of the sportswriter and journalist Gianni Brera. Inter Women announced their move to the stadium in 2023 and played their first match at the Arena Civica on 23 November 2023 against AC Milan.

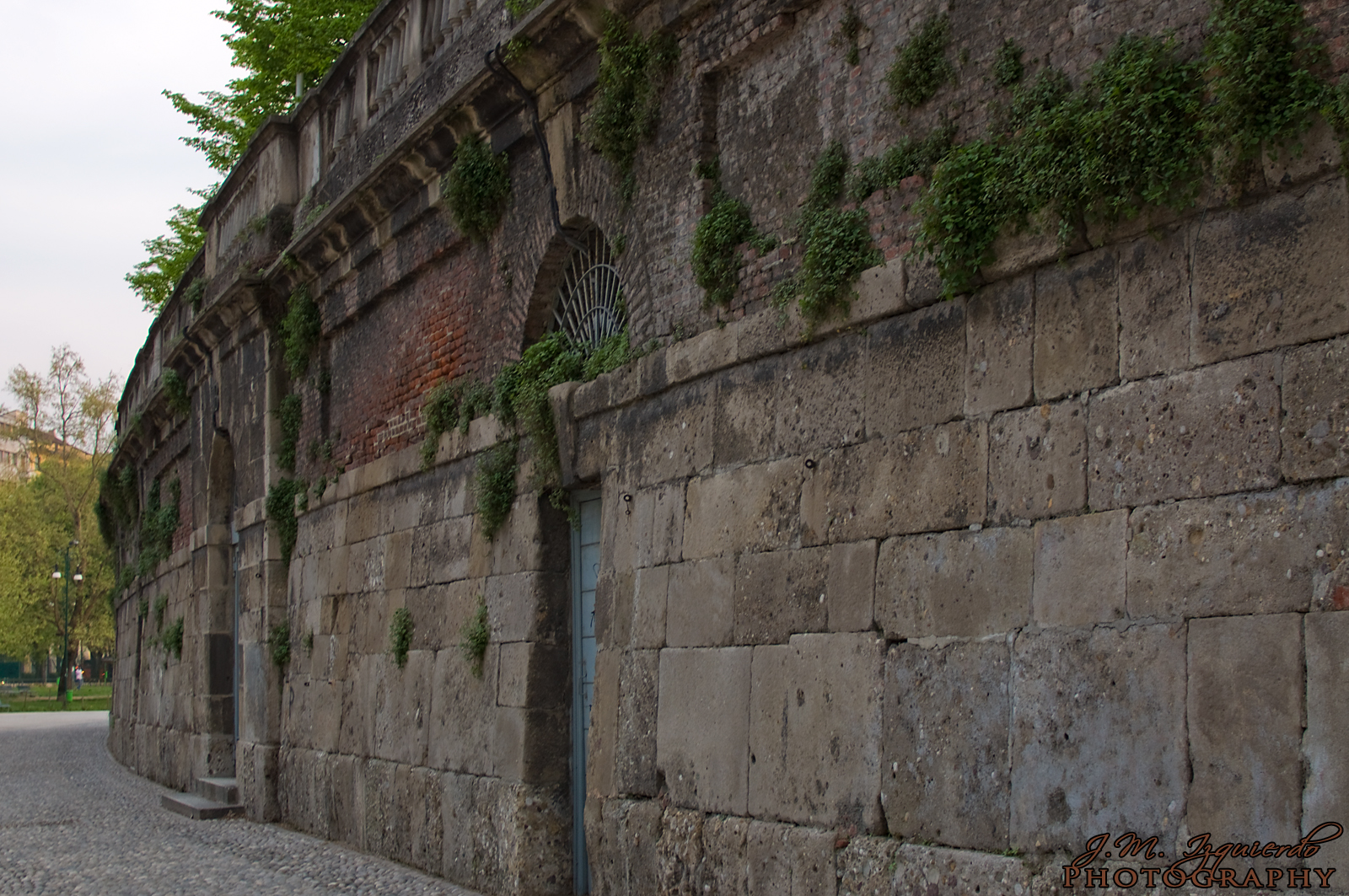
The facade of the stadium

== Facilities ==
- one 6-lane/400 m track
- one football and rugby pitch (100 x 86 m)

== See also ==
- Parco Sempione
- Brera
- Palazzina Appiani

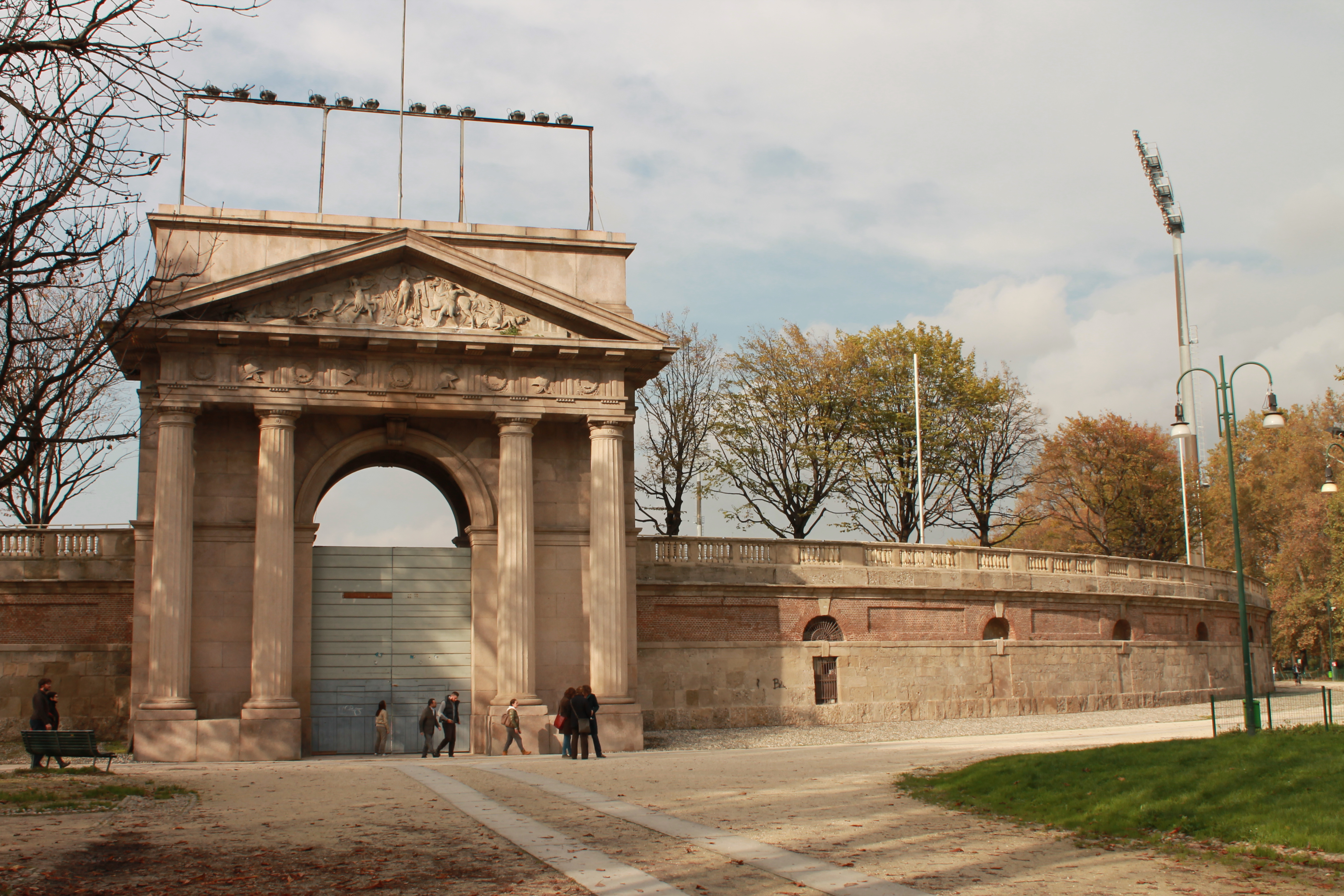
The entrance of the Arena
