= Sandagdorjiin Erdenebat =

Mongolian football coach

Personal information
- Date of birth: June 17, 1966 (age 60)
- Place of birth: Ulaanbaatar, Mongolia

Team information
- Current team: Mongolia

Managerial career
- Years: Team
- 2011–2014: Mongolia (men)
- 2021–: Mongolia (women)

Sandagdorjiin Erdenebat (Mongolian: Сандагдоржийн Эрдэнэбат; born June 17, 1966) is a Mongolian football coach. He was the coach of the Mongolia national football team from 2011 to 2014.

== Career ==
=== Managerial ===
Nat	Team	from	to	Record				
Nat	Team	from	to	Games	Wins	Draws	Losses	Win %
(Mongolia)	Mongolia	2011	2014	7	2	1	4	28.57
Total				7	2	1	4	28.57
