= Amedeo Mangone =

Italian footballer (born 1968)

Personal information
- Date of birth: 12 July 1968 (age 58)
- Place of birth: Milan, Italy
- Height: 1.85 m (6 ft 1 in)
- Position: Defender

Youth career
- 1986–1987: A.C. Milan

Senior career*
Years	Team	Apps	(Gls)
1987–1989	Pergocrema	62	(1)
1989–1993	Solbiatese	117	(2)
1993–1997	Bari	89	(0)
1997–1999	Bologna	78	(0)
1999–2001	Roma	36	(0)
2001–2002	Parma	1	(0)
2002	→ Brescia (loan)	17	(0)
2002–2005	Piacenza	74	(0)
2005	Catanzaro	4	(0)

Managerial career
- 2006–2007: Pavia (youth)
- 2007–2010: Pavia
- 2010–2011: Reggiana
- 2014–2015: AlbinoLeffe
- 2015–2016: Gama
- 2019–2020: Brera
- 2022–2023: Villa Valle
- * Club domestic league appearances and goals

Amedeo Mangone (born 12 July 1968) is an Italian football coach and former player, who played as a defender.

== Playing career ==
Mangone was born in Milan. A product of A.C. Milan's youth system, he was transferred in 1987 to Pergocrema of Serie C2. In 1989, he moved to Solbiatese, another Serie C2 club; he left the club 1993 to join Serie B club Bari, being one of the protagonists of the galletti's promotion to Serie A. In 1996, he moved to Bologna, and to Roma three years later, for 13 billion lire. In 2001–02 he joined Parma (in a swap deal, Mangone, Sergei Gurenko and Paolo Poggi to Parma; Diego Fuser, Saliou Lassissi and Raffaele Longo to Roma) and then spent periods at Brescia and Piacenza, ending his career in 2005.

== Coaching career ==
In 2007, he was appointed head coach of Pavia in Serie C2. In June 2010 he was announced as new head coach of Lega Pro Prima Divisione club Reggiana. On 22 December 2011 he was sacked.

He then served as head coach of Brazilian club Gama for a total seven games between December 2015 and March 2016, being fired due to visa-related issues.

In March 2019 he was appointed coach of Milan-based amateurs Brera until the end of the season.

On 22 February 2022, he was hired as head coach of Serie D relegation-struggling club Villa Valle. After saving his club from relegation through playoffs, Mangone was successively confirmed as the club's head coach also for the 2022–23 season. After a poor start to the 2023-24 season, with only 1 win in 7 games, Mangone was fired in early October 2023.

== Honours ==
Bologna

- UEFA Intertoto Cup: 1998

Roma

- Serie A: 2000–01
