= My Mongolia Park Stadium =

Stadium in Darkhan, Darkhan-Uul, Mongolia

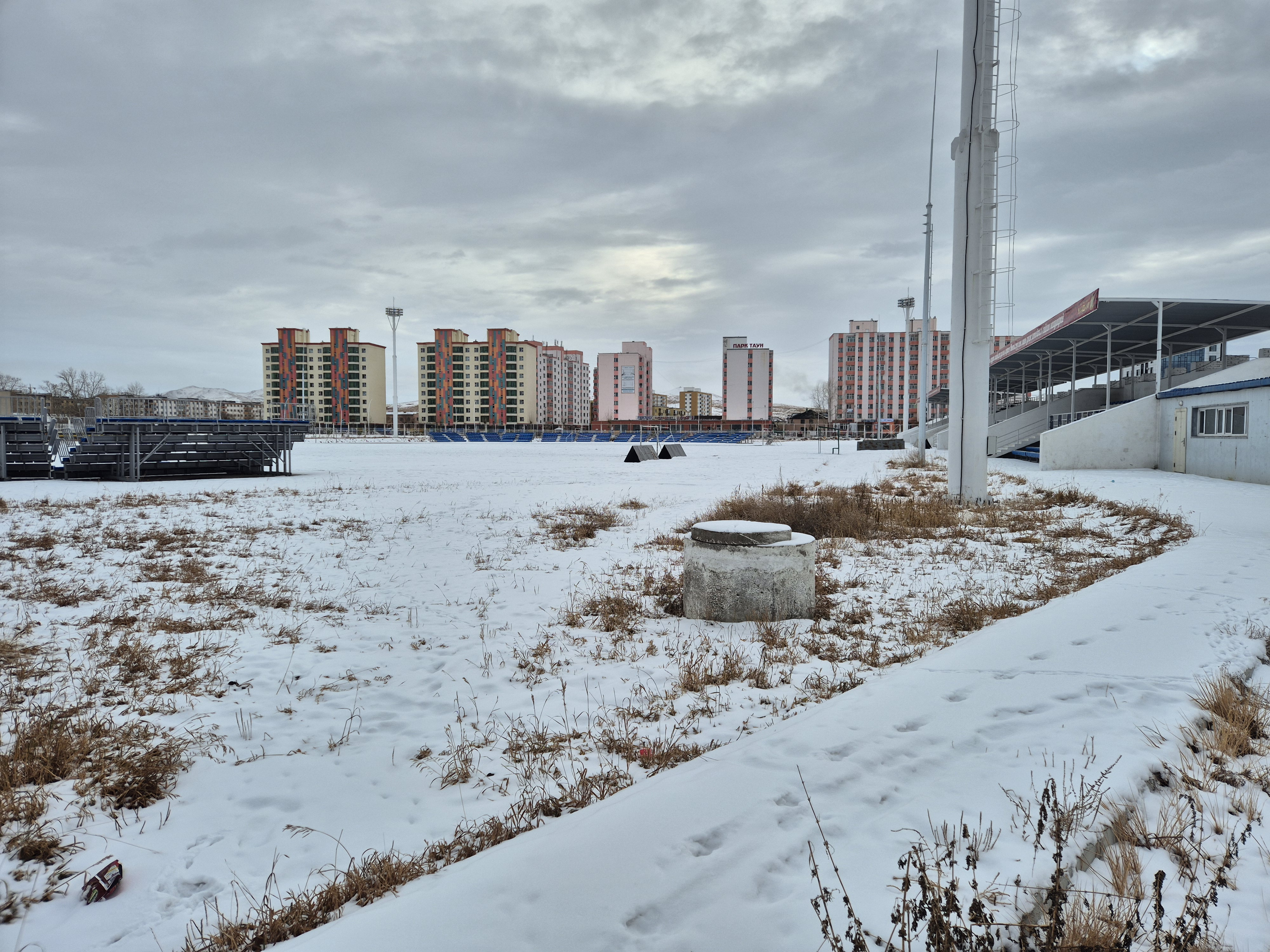
- Interactive map of My Mongolia Park Stadium
- Location: Darkhan, Darkhan-Uul, Mongolia
- Coordinates: 49°27′49.8″N 105°57′16.8″E
- Capacity: 1,700
- Surface: Artificial turf

Construction
- Groundbreaking: 8 May 2020
- Opened: 16 October 2022
- Cost: ₮1.6 billion ($454,000 USD)
- General contractor: Dorniin Urgoo LLC

Tenant
- Darkhan City FC (2022-present)

My Mongolia Park Stadium is a 1,700-seat association football and track and field stadium in Darkhan, Darkhan-Uul Province, Mongolia. It meets standards to host national and international competitions. The stadium is located at My Mongolia Park, one of Darkhan's main public spaces. The facility offers free WiFi from Mobicom.

== History ==
Construction at the stadium began on 8 May 2020. The opening ceremony took place 16 March 2022 and included the final of the provincial club football tournament.

Total cost of the construction was ₮1.6 billion (US$454,000), approximately 2.5% of the aimag's yearly budget.

Despite the official opening, additional small projects were carried out in 2023.
