= Oyunbaataryn Mijiddorj =

Mongolian footballer

Oyunbaatar Mijiddorj
Personal information
- Full name: Oyunbaatar Mijiddorj; Мижиддорж Оюунбаатар
- Date of birth: 22 August 1996 (age 30)
- Place of birth: Erdenet, Mongolia
- Height: 1.77 m (5 ft 10 in)
- Position: Striker

Team information
- Current team: Ulaanbaatar
- Number: 9

Senior career*
Years	Team	Apps	(Gls)
2010–2017	Khangarid		(29)
2017–2022	Ulaanbaatar City		(17)
2022–	Ulaanbaatar		(26)

International career^{‡}
2016–	Mongolia	17	(2)
- * Club domestic league appearances and goals as of 26 May 2024 ‡ National team caps and goals as of 5 September 2024

Oyunbaatar Mijiddorj (Mongolian: Мижиддорж Оюунбаатар; born 22 August 1996) is a Mongolian footballer who plays for the Khangarid of the Mongolian Premier League, and the Mongolian national team.

== Club career ==
Mijiddorj has played for Khangarid of the Mongolian Premier League since 2010. He was the league's top scorer for the 2016 season with 29 goals in 18 appearances. He also received the award for top forward in the league that year.

In July 2017 he joined Mongolian side Ulaanbaatar City along with fellow national team player Murun Altankhuyag.

== International career ==
Mijiddorj made his senior international debut on 3 November 2016 in a 1–2 defeat to Macau in the 2016 AFC Solidarity Cup. He scored his first goal on 7 June 2021 against Kyrgyzstan in their 1–0 win.

=== International career statistics ===
As of match played 5 September 2024

Mongolia national team
Year	Apps	Goals
2016	2	0
2019	6	0
2021	3	1
2023	2	0
2024	4	1
Total	17	2

No.	Date	Venue	Opponent	Score	Result	Competition
1.	7 June 2021	Nagai Stadium, Osaka, Japan	Kyrgyzstan	1–0	1–0	2022 FIFA World Cup qualification
2.	5 September 2024	Kapten I Wayan Dipta Stadium, Gianyar, Indonesia	Timor-Leste	1–2	1–4	2027 AFC Asian Cup qualification
