= Solmate =

Italy-based holding company

- Type: Holding company
- Industry: Cryptocurrency, Sports
- Founded: 2022; 4 years ago
- Key people: Daniel J. McClory; Chris Gardner; Alan Rothenberg; Giuseppe Rossi; Fabio Scacciavillani; Alberto Libanori
- Owner: Daniel J. McClory (54.5%)
- Website: Brera Holdings

Solmate is a UAE-based cryptocurrency digital asset treasury. Founded in 2022 as Brera Holdings PLC, it was originally a holding company focused on multi club ownership (MCO) in sports. With offices in Milan and Dublin, at its peak the club owned six association football clubs and one volleyball club. Traded on the Nasdaq, Brera Holdings was the world's first publicly traded multi-club sports ownership group.

== History ==
The investor group acquired its first club, Brera Calcio based in Milan, in 2022. In May 2023, it purchased Macedonian First Football League club FK Akademija Pandev Brera Strumica from its founder Goran Pandev and rebranded it as Brera Strumica. The same month, the group created Brera Tchumene FC in Mozambique, expanding the brand outside of Europe for the first time. In July 2023, Brera Holdings completed the acquisition of its first volleyball club with the purchase of UYBA of the Italian Serie A. Brera Holdings completed the purchase of Mongolian football club Ilch FC in October 2023, expanding into Asia for the first time.

In February 2024, an advisory board of high-profile individuals was announced, including former president of the United States Soccer Federation and founding father of Major League Soccer Alan Rothenberg. The following month, it was announced that minority stakeholder and Executive Chairman Daniel J. McClory became majority shareholder in the company with 54.5% ownership.

In 2025 Brera Holdings PLC completed the acquisition of a 52% majority stake in Italian Serie B football club SS Juve Stabia, finalizing the multi-step process on June 20, 2025.

Brera Holdings announced in September 2025 that it was changing its name to Solmate and was switching its emphasis to cryptocurrency, becoming a Solana-based digital asset treasure. As part of the announcement, it was stated that Solmate would continue to manage Brera Holdings' existing sport clubs ownership business. The following March, Solmate's stock price plummeted after the group announced that it was shifting away from sports club ownership, retaining only its flagship club SS Juve Stabia of Italy's Serie B. Other clubs including Brera Ilch and Brera Tchumene would be sold, freeing Capital for the business pivot.

== Current clubs ==
=== Football ===
- (Italy) SS Juve Stabia

== Former clubs ==
=== Football ===
- (Italy) Brera Calcio
- (North Macedonia) FC AP Brera Strumica
- (Mongolia) Brera Ilch FC
- (North Macedonia) WFC Tiverija Brera Strumica
- (Mozambique) Brera Tchumene FC

=== Volleyball ===
- (Italy) UYBA

== Former competitions ==
In 2021, Brera Calcio hosted the first FENIX Trophy, an annual association football competition for semi-professional and amateur clubs. Following the creation of Brera Holdings, the group has continued to organize and promote the tournament and has garnered international attention, including coverage by Sky Sports and ZDF.
