= Brera Tchumene FC =

Mozambique football club

- Full name: Brera Tchumene Football Club
- Founded: 2023
- Dissolved: 2025
- Ground: Estádio da Matola
- Capacity: 3,000
- Owner: Brera Holdings
- League: Moçambola
- 2024: 11th
- Website: https://brerafc.com/brera-tchumene/

Brera Tchumene FC was a professional football club from Matola, Mozambique that last competed in the Moçambola, the highest level of football in the country. Brera Tchumene was under the Brera Holdings umbrella.

== History ==
In March 2023, it was announced that Brera Holdings had created the club as the third club under the Brera umbrella, along with Brera Calcio of Italy and Brera Strumica of North Macedonia. Initially the club would compete in the Segunda Divisão with the goal of earning a quick promotion to the Moçambola. The club would call the Estádio da Matola home. On 30 April 2023, the club played its first-ever match in an away fixture against AD Ximanganine. Under head coach Hassane Rachide, the team finished its first season with a 13-2-1 record over the sixteen-match season, becoming champions of the Provincial II Divisão Championship, also known as the Maputo Championship, and earning a right to participate in the promotion playoffs.

In September 2023, seven Brera Tchumene players, including head coach Hassane Rachide were selected for the Mozambique U20 national team for a friendly against Eswatini. In November of that year, Brera Tchumene FC went on to earn promotion to the top flight for the 2024 season, winning six of six matches in the play-off round then defeating Desportivo da Matola 4–1 over the two-leg series.

Brera Tchumene finished in eleventh position during its first season in the Moçambola, narrowly avoiding relegation. By February 2025, it was announced that the club would be dissolved as Brera Holdings did not think the project was financially viable without a major sponsorship. At that time, the club had not made any statements regarding if the club would compete again at another leavel in the future.

== Domestic history ==
Key

Champion Runners-up 3rd Place

Season	League										Domestic Cup	Notes
Season	Div.	Pos.	Pl.	W	D	L	GF	GA	GD	P	Domestic Cup	Notes
2023	2nd	1st	16	13	1	2	68	7	61	40	-	Promoted to Moçambola via play-offs
2024	1st	11th	22	4	6	12	22	29	–7	18	-	

== Honours ==
- Campeonato Nacional de Futebol da Segunda Divisão (1)

Winner: 2023
