= Martín Belforti =

Argentine footballer

Personal information
- Full name: Martín Belforti Rodríguez
- Date of birth: 4 July 1981 (age 45)
- Place of birth: Buenos Aires, Argentina
- Height: 1.82 m (5 ft 11 1/2 in)
- Position: Midfielder

Senior career*
Years	Team	Apps	(Gls)
2000–2002	Argentinos Juniors	10	(0)
2003–2004	Brera	4	(1)
2004–2006	Defensores Belgrano	8	(2)
2006	Melilla	5	(0)
2007	Loja	17	(2)
2007–2008	Villanovense	15	(5)
2008–2010	Cerro Reyes	60	(10)
2011–2012	Sporting Villanueva	17	(2)
2012	Roquetas	17	(1)
2013	Estudiantes Caseros	1	(0)
2013	Arandina	15	(4)
2014	Jorge Wilstermann	18	(0)
2014–2015	Rayo Cantabria		
2015	Lucena	6	(0)
2015–2016	Ciudad Lucena	11	(0)
2016–2018	Europa	55	(11)
Total		259	(38)
- * Club domestic league appearances and goals

Martín Belforti Rodríguez (born 4 July 1981) is an Argentine former professional footballer who played as a midfielder.

== Club career ==
Born in Buenos Aires, Belforti played in the Argentine Primera División with Argentinos Juniors, also representing in his country Defensores de Belgrano and Estudiantes de Buenos Aires. After a spell in Italy at Brera Calcio in amateur football he moved to Spain in 2006, where he spent the vast majority of his remaining career, exclusively in the lower leagues.

== Personal life ==
Belforti's twin brother, José, was also a footballer. A defender, he too played several seasons in Spain.
