= Brera Calcio =

Italian football club

Brera
- Full name: F.C.D. Brera
- Founded: 2000
- Ground: Arena Civica
- Capacity: 10,000
- Owner: Brera Holdings
- Chairman: Alessandro Aleotti
- League: Terza Categoria
Home colours

Brera Calcio is an Italian football club from Milan, Lombardy. Its colours are green and black.

Known as "the third team of Milan", due to its creative social and cultural projects. In 2022, the club was purchased by Brera Holdings.

== History ==
Brera Football Club was founded in 2000 by the young publisher and journalist Alessandro Aleotti. The first manager appointed was the algerian coach Noureddine Zekri. The team played its matches in the newly reopened Arena Civica, but was relegated from Serie D.

In the season 2003/2004, through a partnership with the FIGC and Carcere di Opera (one of the biggest prisons in Milan and in Italy), Brera founded FreeOpera Brera, a team composed of detainees. Allowed to take part to 2003/2004 Terza Categoria, the team won the championship and was promoted to Seconda Categoria. The initiative obtained a lot of praise and RAI talked about it in a "Sfide" episode.

In the season 2006/2007 Brera, under the leading of coach Noureddine Zekri, obtained its first promotion, beating Bresso in the playoff and gaining the right to take part to Promozione the following season.

In the season 2011/2012, after temporarily ceasing the first team's activity, Brera took part to the Torneo di Viareggio under the name of Brera Emergence Gabon, a team composed of young Gabonian footballers.

In the season 2014/2015 the team, with Andrea Mazza appointed as coach, won its first championship, getting promoted from Seconda Categoria to Prima Categoria. In January 2016, in collaboration with the Serbian Roma actress and activist Dijana Pavlovic, Brera started managing the Romani People football team.

From 2016/2017 Brera played in Eccellenza and Enzo Gambaro has been appointed as new coach. Due to a poor beginning of season, in October 2016 Enzo Gambaro resigned and was replaced with former Brera manager Andrea Mazza. The season ended with the team's relegation and Andrea Mazza's resignation. In July Andrea Valle was appointed as new coach. The 2017/2018 season saw some changes on the roster side, as it was mostly composed by young foreign players: the adaption to the league was hard and, despite some outstanding performances, the team eventually got relegated.

In August 2018 Marco Resca was appointed as new coach of the team now facing the Prima Categoria division. After a promising start, the team went through some tough time and in March, after Resca's resignation, former AS Roma defender Amedeo Mangone came in as new coach and led the team so a smooth season ending. The following season, with former Brera legend Marco Nichetti in charge of the team, was affected by the COVID-19 pandemic, which suspended the ongoing championship. In September 2020 Amedeo Mangone agreed on resuming his activity as Brera head coach.

The 2021/2022 season marked the debut of the team in a brand new European tournament of its own invention, the Fenix Trophy. After a 3rd place in 2022 and a 4th place in the 2023 Milan Final 4, due to the inactivity of its own non-professional squad in Italy, Brera FC ceased to participate in the tournament to step in as the main organizer.

In January 2023, a group of US-based investors - including Chris Gardner (currently sitting in the company board, together with Goran Pandev) - listed on the Nasdaq Stock Exchange Market a company called Brera Holdings PLC, created to fund Brera FC's rich history of ESG themed projects, as well as its expansion in professional football: this led to the creation of a club in the Second Division of Mozambique (called Brera Tchumene FC and immediately promoted in its first season) and the acquisition and subsequent rebranding of a club in the Macedonian First Football League, FC AP Brera. In 2024 the club has completed a further expansion in Asia (namely in Mongolia), with the acquisition of a club in the local First Division, promptly rebranded as Brera Ilch.

== Notable managers ==
- (Algeria) Noureddine Zekri
- (Italy) Enzo Gambaro
- (Italy) Andrea Mazza
- (Italy) Marco Nichetti
- (Italy) Marco Nicoletti
- (Italy) Walter Zenga
- (Italy) Amedeo Mangone

== Notable players ==
- (Italy) Dario Drudi
- (Italy) Sergio D'Autilia
- (Italy) Guido Corteggiano
- (Italy) Andrea Merenda
- (Argentina) Martín Belforti
- (Argentina) José Belforti
- (Argentina) Maximiliano Martinez
