= Shadab Iftikhar =

Pakistani-English football manager (born 1989)

Personal information
- Place of birth: Preston, England

Team information
- Current team: Morecambe FC U19

Managerial career
- Years: Team
- 2012–2013: Nelson (caretaker)
- 2013-2015: University of Central Lancashire
- 2014-2015: Hesketh Bank
- 2016–2017: Bayangol
- 2018: Vailima Kiwi
- 2018-2020: University of Central Lancashire
- 2021–2022: Fort William
- 2023: Pakistan U19
- 2025: Thimphu City
- 2025-present: Morecambe FC U19

Shadab Iftikhar is an English football manager.

He currently holds an UEFA "A" license. In addition to coaching, Iftikhar has also served as a scout for Roberto Martinez at Wigan Athletic and Everton for two years at each club, and the Belgium national team.

== Early life ==
Shadab was born in Preston, Lancashire to a British Pakistani family.

== Managerial career ==
=== Early years ===
In May 2010, Iftikhar was named the reserve team manager for Hesketh Bank after previously working with the junior teams since 2007 at age 17 while working on his early coaching badges.

In 2015, he was named manager of the senior squad the day before the season began. Despite working with a completely new squad and a difficult start to the season, the team finished out of the relegation zone. He also continued to strengthen the reserve squad and saw it promoted to the top reserve league that season. He declined an offer to continue being the squad's manager and left the club following the season. While at Hesketh, he was mentored by Dave Sutton, former professional player and manager of Rochdale.

=== Nelson ===
In June 2012, Iftikar was appointed a first team coach of Nelson of the North West Counties Football League prior to the 2012–13 season. In October 2012 he temporarily took charge of the senior team after co-managers Robert Grimes and Michael Morrison resigned in October 2012.

=== Central Lancashire ===
He was named manager of the university men's team for the University of Central Lancashire which competes in the BUSA Football League for the 2015 season.

=== Bayangol ===
In May 2016, he was appointed manager of Mongolia Premier League The previous season, Bayangol were playing in the Mongolia 1st League but were forced into promotion by the Mongolian Football Federation ten days before the season began after second division club, Continental, declined promotion after earning it for financial reasons. Bayangol were unable to meet Premier League requirements for the team's manager to hold at least an UEFA "B" license or equivalent so they posted the opening on Twitter. Prior to his move to Mongolia, Iftikhar was preparing to travel to Canada for a coaching position he had accepted.

=== Mongolia ===
He began serving as an assistant coach for the Mongolian national team during the 2017 EAFF East Asian Cup.

=== Accrington Stanley ===
In June 2017, Iftikhar was announced as a new academy coach for Accrington Stanley, then of League Two, securing his return to Britain.

=== Valima Kiwi ===
In October 2018, Iftikhar signed a deal to take over as new head coach of Vailima Kiwi of the Samoa National League.

=== Fort William ===
By 2021, Iftikhar was part of the staff of Skelmersdale United of the North West Counties League Premier Division. At the end of November 2021, Iftikhar was appointed manager of Fort William in the Scottish Highland Football League who were deemed "The Worst Team in Britain" in 2019, by many news media publishers.

=== Pakistan ===
On 5 September 2023, Iftikhar was appointed as the head coach of the Pakistan under 19 football team in their first participation in the 2023 SAFF U-19 Championship.

=== Return to Wigan Athletic ===
On 2 July 2024, it was announced that he had been appointed as a first team coach at EFL League One side Wigan Athletic along with Tom Huddlestone.

=== Thimphu City ===
On 2 March 2025, Wigan Athletic announced that Iftikhar had departed the club having accepted an offer to become manager of Bhutan Premier League club Thimphu City.

=== Morecambe FC U19 ===
In 2025 Shadab returned to Morecambe FC to take over the U19 team.

== Scouting career ==
=== Wigan Athletic ===
During his early years coaching Hesketh Bank, Iftikhar met Wigan Athletic manager Roberto Martinez, and become a voluntary scout for two years at the club.

=== Everton ===
Iftikhar followed Martinez to Everton after his appointment as manager in 2013, and spent further two years working under Martinez at Goodison Park.

=== Belgium ===
In 2021, Iftikhar was reunited with Roberto Martinez as Iftikhar served as a scout for the Belgium national team during UEFA Euro 2020.
