= Mayu Ikejiri =

Japanese footballer

Mayu Ikejiri 池尻 茉由
Personal information
- Full name: Mayu Ikejiri
- Date of birth: December 19, 1996 (age 29)
- Place of birth: Arao, Kumamoto, Japan
- Height: 1.65 m (5 ft 5 in)
- Position: Forward

Team information
- Current team: Mynavi Sendai
- Number: 8

Youth career
- 2012–2014: Hinomoto Gakuen High School
- 2015–2018: Kibi International University

Senior career*
Years	Team	Apps	(Gls)
2019	Suwon UDC	28	(8)
2020–	Mynavi Sendai	0	(0)

International career
2019–2020	Japan	7	(2)
- * Club domestic league appearances and goals

Mayu Ikejiri (池尻 茉由, Ikejiri Mayu; born December 19, 1996) is a Japanese football player. She plays as a forward for Mynavi Sendai in the WE League and Japan national team.

== Club career ==
Ikejiri was born in Kumamoto Prefecture on December 19, 1996. After graduating from Kibi International University, she joined WK League club Suwon UDC WFC in 2019.

== National team career ==
In February 2019, Ikejiri was selected for the Japan national team for the SheBelieves Cup. She first played in this tournament on February 27, as a defensive midfielder against the United States.

== National team statistics ==
Japan national team
Year	Apps	Goals
2019	6	2
2020	1	0
Total	7	2

== International goals ==
No.	Date	Venue	Opponent	Score	Result	Competition
1.	11 December 2019	Busan Asiad Main Stadium, Busan, South Korea	Chinese Taipei	6–0	9–0	2019 EAFF E-1 Football Championship
2.	11 December 2019	Busan Asiad Main Stadium, Busan, South Korea	Chinese Taipei	9–0	9–0	2019 EAFF E-1 Football Championship
