= Khan-Uul Stadium =

Stadium in Khan Uul, Ulaanbaatar, Mongolia

- Interactive map of Khan-Uul Stadium
- Location: 8th Khoroo, Khan Uul; Ulaanbaatar, Mongolia
- Coordinates: 47.8864°N 106.9057°E
- Capacity: 500
- Surface: Artificial turf
- Field size: 115m x 85m

Construction
- Groundbreaking: 2018
- Opened: 19 October 2019

Tenant
- Mongolian First League (2022-present) Mongolia Second League (2022-present) National Amateur Cup (2022-present)

The Khan-Uul Stadium is a 500-seat association football stadium in Khan Uul District, Ulaanbaatar, Mongolia. Located near the AIC Steppe Arena, the area also includes a winter sports complex. The stadium meets all FIFA standards to host A-level matches and competitions.

== History ==
Construction on the field surface began in 2018 as part of the FIFA Forward initiative which helped fund football projects in developing areas. On 19 October 2019, FIFA president Gianni Infantino handed over the completed field to officials of the Mongolian Football Federation as part of a celebration of the association's sixtieth anniversary.

When Mongolia was chosen to host the 2023 East Asian Youth Games, the local government chose to construct a stadium around the pitch as the venue was to host several events. By May 2021, construction of the arena on the eight-hectare plot was estimated to be fifty percent complete.

By the middle of the 2022 Mongolia Second League season, most matches were being held at the new arena. Several matches of the Mongolian First League were held there also. Previously, all matches of every tier of Mongolian football were played at the MFF Football Centre. The addition of the second venue improved the scheduling of matches across leagues.

The first official match held at the arena was on 9 May 2022 as Tuuliin Tom Tunuud FC defeated Deren FC 2 in a Second League fixture.
