= Michael Adeyemo =

Nigerian lawyer and politician

Rt. Hon. Michael Adesina Olusegun Adeyemo

Speaker of the Oyo State House of Assembly
- In office 2015 – 27 April 2018
- Governor: Abiola Ajimobi
- Preceded by: Monsurat Sunmonu
- Succeeded by: Olagunju Ojo

Member, Oyo State House of Assembly
- In office 2011 – 27 April 2018
- Constituency: Ibarapa East

Personal details
- Born: 1971 Lanlate, Oyo State, Nigeria
- Died: April 27, 2018 (aged 46–47) Ibadan, Oyo State, Nigeria
- Party: All Progressives Congress
- Education: University of Port Harcourt; University of Ibadan
- Occupation: Lawyer, politician
- Profession: Legal practitioner

Michael Adesina Olusegun Adeyemo was a Nigerian lawyer and politician who served as Speaker of the 8th Oyo State House of Assembly from 2011 until he died in 2018.

== Early life and education ==
Adeyemo was born in 1971 into the Adeyemo family of the Alaarun compound in Lanlate, located in Ibarapa East Local Government Area of Oyo State.

He completed his primary education at IMG, Oke Ado, Ibadan, and later attended Celestial Church High School, Oke Ado, Ibadan, for his secondary schooling. Adeyemo earned a Bachelor's degree in Education Management from the University of Port Harcourt before proceeding to the University of Ibadan (UI), where he obtained an LL.B in Law.

== Career ==
Adeyemo began his professional career at the Ibadan-based law firm Olujinmi and Akeredolu, where he practised as a lawyer. After several years in legal practice, he entered politics.

His political career began in 2007. In 2011, he was elected to the Oyo State House of Assembly representing the Ibarapa East constituency. During the 7th Assembly, he served as Deputy Chief Whip and was a member of committees including Fund Allocation, Works and Transport, Agriculture, Trade and Investment, Appropriation, and Public Finance. In 2015, he was elected Speaker of the Assembly. Adeyemo was affiliated with the All Progressive Congress (APC–Ibarapa East State Constituency).

He was also involved in the Nigerian Bar Association (NBA), serving on the executive committee of the Ibadan branch as an auditor and Assistant Secretary. He was also a member of the International Bar Association (IBA).

== Death ==
Adeyemo died on Friday, 27 April 2018, at the age of 47, following a heart attack. He died while being transported to Jericho Specialist Hospital, Ibadan. His burial took place in his hometown of Lanlate in Ibarapa East, Oyo State.
