= Maximiliano Martínez (footballer, born 1979) =

Argentine footballer

Personal information
- Full name: Maximiliano Martínez
- Date of birth: 10 October 1979 (age 47)
- Place of birth: Junín, Argentina
- Position: Forward

Senior career*
Years	Team	Apps	(Gls)
2002–2003	Sarmiento (J)	26	(2)
2003–2004	Brera		
2014	Sarmiento (L)	4	(0)
- * Club domestic league appearances and goals

Maximiliano Martínez (born 10 October 1979) is an Argentine footballer who plays as a forward. He is currently a free agent.

== Career ==
Martínez signed for local side Sarmiento (J) in 2002, subsequently scoring twice in twenty-six professional fixtures as the club finished twentieth overall in the 2002–03 Primera B Metropolitana season. At the conclusion of the aforementioned campaign, Martínez joined Brera of Italy's Terza Categoria. In 2014, Martínez had a spell with Torneo Federal B's Sarmiento (L). Four appearances followed.

== Career statistics ==
As of 2 October 2018.

Club statistics
Club	Season	League			Cup (Note: Includes the Copa Argentina)		League Cup		Continental		Other		Total	
Club	Season	Division	Apps	Goals	Apps	Goals	Apps	Goals	Apps	Goals	Apps	Goals	Apps	Goals
Sarmiento (J)	2002–03	Primera B Metropolitana	26	2	0	0	—		—		0	0	26	2
Sarmiento (L)	2014	Torneo Federal B	4	0	0	0	—		—		0	0	4	0
Career total			30	2	0	0	—		—		0	0	30	2
