= Campeonato Nacional de Futebol da Segunda Divisão =

Mozambican football league

- Country: Mozambique
- Confederation: CAF
- Level on pyramid: 2
- Promotion to: Moçambola
- Domestic cup: Taça de Moçambique

Campeonato Nacional de Futebol da Segunda Divisão (or Second Division National Football Championship) is the second division of football in Mozambique.

The league is organized by the Mozambican Football Federation. The competition is played in two stages. In phase one, champions are determined by the provincial association tournaments with the winners competing in a second phase to determine promotion to the Moçambola.
