= Kharaatsai FC =

Association football club in Mongolia

Kharaatsai
- Full name: Football Club Kharaatsai
- Founded: 1999; 27 years ago
- League: Mongolia Second League

Football Club Kharaatsai (Mongolian: Хөлбөмбөгийн Клуб Хараацай) is a Mongolian football club, competing in the Mongolia Second League. The club also fields a women's side, Kharaatsai WFC, in the Women's National Football League.

== History ==
In 2019, the team played in the first edition of the Mongolia Second League, which despite the name corresponds to the 3rd level of football in Mongolia. In total, the team played 8 matches in the competition, having six wins, one draw and one defeat. They finished at the second place, behind BCH Lions.

== Honours ==
- Runner-up, Mongolia Second League, 2019

== Women's team ==
The club also maintains a women's team that disputes the Women's National Football League, Kharaatsai women team 2023 and 2026 champion
