= 2019 EAFF E-1 Football Championship (women) =

2019년 EAFF E-1 풋볼 챔피언십

Tournament details
- Host country: South Korea
- Dates: 10–17 December
- Teams: 4 (from 1 sub-confederation)
- Venues: 2 (in 1 host city)

Final positions
- Champions: Japan (3rd title)
- Runners-up: South Korea
- Third place: China
- Fourth place: Chinese Taipei

Tournament statistics
- Matches played: 6
- Goals scored: 17 (2.83 per match)
- Attendance: 8,193 (1,366 per match)
- Top scorer(s): (Japan) Mana Iwabuchi (5 goals)
- Best player: (Japan) Moeka Minami

The 2019 EAFF E-1 Football Championship was the seventh edition of the women's tournament of the EAFF E-1 Football Championship, the women's football championship of East Asia. It was held in South Korea in December 2019.

On 30 October 2019, amid strained ties between the two Koreas, EAFF announced that North Korea, which automatically qualified for the final round, had withdrawn from the tournament; Chinese Taipei was chosen as the replacement.

== Teams ==
Based on FIFA Women's world ranking, ten teams were allocated to their particular stage. Each winner of the preliminary round progressed to the next stage.

Final Round	Second preliminary round	First preliminary round
South Korea (hosts); Japan; North Korea (withdrew)	China; Chinese Taipei; Hong Kong	Guam; Macau; Mongolia (hosts); Northern Mariana Islands (non-FIFA member)

== Venues ==
Preliminary Round
(Guam) Dededo	(Mongolia) Ulaanbaatar	
GFA National Training Center	National Stadium	MFF Football Centre
Capacity: 5,000	Capacity: 12,500	Capacity: 5,000
Final Round
(South Korea) Busan
Busan Asiad Main Stadium		Busan Gudeok Stadium
Capacity: 53,769		Capacity: 12,459

== Tiebreakers ==
The ranking of teams was determined as follows:

1. Points in head-to-head matches among tied teams;
2. Goal difference in head-to-head matches among tied teams;
3. Goals scored in head-to-head matches among tied teams;
4. If more than two teams are tied, and after applying all head-to-head criteria above, a subset of teams are still tied, all head-to-head criteria above are reapplied exclusively to this subset of teams;
5. Goal difference in all group matches;
6. Goals scored in all group matches;
7. Penalty shoot-out if only two teams are tied and they met in the last round of the group;
8. Disciplinary points (yellow card = 1 point, red card as a result of two yellow cards = 3 points, direct red card = 3 points, yellow card followed by direct red card = 4 points);
9. Drawing of lots.

== First preliminary round ==
The first preliminary round was held in Mongolia.

=== Table ===
Pos	Team	Pld	W	D	L	GF	GA	GD	Pts	Qualification
1	Mongolia (H)	3	2	1	0	4	2	+2	7	Advance to Second preliminary round
2	Guam	3	1	1	1	5	1	+4	4	
3	Northern Mariana Islands	3	0	2	1	2	3	−1	2	
4	Macau	3	0	2	1	0	5	−5	2	

Source: EAFF.com
(H) Hosts

=== Matches ===
- All times are local (UTC+8).
3 September 2018
14:00

Macau	0–5	Guam
	Report	K. Hoover 6', 31'; Merrill 54'; R. Hoover 67'; Naden 73'

National Stadium, Ulaanbaatar
Referee: Cha Min-ji (South Korea)
3 September 2018
17:00

Mongolia	3–2	Northern Mariana Islands
Namuunaa 51', 82'; Ganchimeg 61'	Report	Griffin 11'; Castillo 21'

National Stadium, Ulaanbaatar
Attendance: 421
Referee: Yu Hong (China)

5 September 2018
13:00

Northern Mariana Islands	0–0	Macau
	Report

MFF Football Centre, Ulaanbaatar
Attendance: 3
Referee: Wang Chieh (Chinese Taipei)
5 September 2018
17:00

Mongolia	1–0	Guam
Otgonbaatar 90+1'	Report

MFF Football Centre, Ulaanbaatar
Attendance: 178
Referee: Law Bik Chi (Hong Kong)

7 September 2018
13:00

Guam	0–0	Northern Mariana Islands
	Report

MFF Football Centre, Ulaanbaatar
Attendance: 32
Referee: Yu Hong (China)
7 September 2018
17:00

Mongolia	0–0	Macau
	Report

MFF Football Centre, Ulaanbaatar
Attendance: 394
Referee: Cha Min-ji (South Korea)

=== Awards ===
Top Scorer	Most Valuable Player
(Guam) Kaycee Hoover	(Mongolia) Tsasan-Okhin Orgodol

== Second preliminary round ==
The second preliminary round was held in December 2018 in Guam from December 1 to 5.

=== Table ===
Pos	Team	Pld	W	D	L	GF	GA	GD	Pts	Qualification
1	China	3	3	0	0	18	0	+18	9	Advance to Final round
2	Chinese Taipei	3	2	0	1	8	2	+6	6	Advance to Final round
3	Hong Kong	3	1	0	2	3	8	−5	3	
4	Mongolia	3	0	0	3	0	19	−19	0	

Source: EAFF.com

=== Matches ===
- All times are local (UTC+10).
1 December 2018
11:00

Chinese Taipei	2–0	Hong Kong
Chen Ying-hui 34'; Chen Yen-ping 70'	Report

Guam Football Association National Training Center, Dededo
Attendance: 150
Referee: Fusako Kajiyama (Japan)
1 December 2018
15:45

China	10–0	Mongolia
Wang Shanshan 4', 17', 25', 58'; Li Jiayue 15'; Zhang Rui 22'; Li Ying 28'; Lou Jiahui 43'; Yang Lina 45'; Yao Wei 89'	Report

Guam Football Association National Training Center, Dededo
Attendance: 150
Referee: Karen Abt (United States)

3 December 2018
11:00

Hong Kong	0–6	China
	Report	Yao Wei 11'; Wang Shanshan 27'; Yang Man 63'; Huang Yini 74'; He Wei 89'; Li Ying 90+2'

Guam Football Association National Training Center, Dededo
Attendance: 100
Referee: Pansa Chaisanit (Thailand)
3 December 2018
15:45

Chinese Taipei	6–0	Mongolia
Lee Hsiu-chin 15', 28', 52', 79'; Lai Li-chin 58'; Chen Ying-hui 75'	Report

Guam Football Association National Training Center, Dededo
Attendance: 125
Referee: Karen Abt (United States)

5 December 2018
11:00

Mongolia	0–3	Hong Kong
	Report	Kwong Wing Yan 43', 45+1'; Cheung Wai Ki 77'

Guam Football Association National Training Center, Dededo
Attendance: 100
Referee: Fusako Kajiyama (Japan)
5 December 2018
15:45

China	2–0	Chinese Taipei
Wang Shanshan 10'; Xiao Yuyi 13'	Report

Guam Football Association National Training Center, Dededo
Attendance: 150
Referee: Pansa Chaisanit (Thailand)

=== Awards ===
Top Scorer	Most Valuable Player
(China) Wang Shanshan	(China) Wang Shanshan

== Final round ==
The final competition was held in South Korea from 10 to 17 December 2019.

=== Table ===
Pos	Team	Pld	W	D	L	GF	GA	GD	Pts	Result
1	Japan (C)	3	3	0	0	13	0	+13	9	Champions
2	South Korea (H)	3	1	1	1	3	1	+2	4	Runners-up
3	China	3	1	1	1	1	3	−2	4	Third place
4	Chinese Taipei	3	0	0	3	0	13	−13	0	Fourth place

Source: EAFF.com
(C) Champions; (H) Hosts

=== Matches ===
10 December 2019
16:15

South Korea	0–0	China
	Report

Busan Gudeok Stadium, Busan
Attendance: 1,500
Referee: Kate Jacewicz (Australia)
11 December 2019
16:20

Chinese Taipei	0–9	Japan
	Report	Iwabuchi 7', 71'; Tanaka 9', 38' (pen.); Kobayashi 17'; Matsubara 44'; Ikejiri 54' (pen.), 90+2'; Seike 66'

Busan Asiad Main Stadium, Busan
Attendance: 218
Referee: Bùi Thị Thu Trang (Vietnam)

14 December 2019
15:55

China	0–3	Japan
	Report	Iwabuchi 9', 44', 56'

Busan Gudeok Stadium, Busan
Attendance: 570
Referee: Rebecca Durcau (Australia)
15 December 2019
16:15

South Korea	3–0	Chinese Taipei
Kang Chae-rim 29', 70'; Jung Seol-bin 87'	Report

Busan Asiad Main Stadium, Busan
Attendance: 1,100
Referee: Law Bik Chi (Hong Kong)

17 December 2019
16:15

Chinese Taipei	0–1	China
	Report	Wu Haiyan 30'

Busan Gudeok Stadium, Busan
Attendance: 587
Referee: Pansa Chaisanit (Thailand)
17 December 2019
19:30

South Korea	0–1	Japan
	Report	Momiki 88' (pen.)

Busan Gudeok Stadium, Busan
Attendance: 4,218
Referee: Kate Jacewicz (Australia)
- All times are local (UTC+9).

=== Awards ===
Best Goalkeeper	Best Defender	Top Scorer	Most Valuable Player
(Japan) Ayaka Yamashita	(South Korea) Jang Sel-gi	(Japan) Mana Iwabuchi	(Japan) Moeka Minami

== Goalscorers ==
There were 17 goals scored in 6 matches, for an average of 2.83 goals per match.

5 goals

- (Japan) Mana Iwabuchi

2 goals

- (Japan) Mayu Ikejiri
- (Japan) Mina Tanaka
- (South Korea) Kang Chae-rim

1 goal

- (China) Wu Haiyan
- (Japan) Arisa Matsubara
- (Japan) Kiko Seike
- (Japan) Rikako Kobayashi
- (Japan) Yuka Momiki
- (South Korea) Jung Seol-bin

== Broadcasting ==
- China: CCTV, PPTV, Guangdong Sports
- Japan: NHK
- Hong Kong: Cable TV, Fantastic Television
- Chinese Taipei: ELTA TV
- South Korea: SPOTV, MBN(South Korean male national team matches only)
