= Storm FC (Mongolia) =

Football club in Mongolia

Storm
- Full name: Storm Football Club
- Founded: 2022
- Ground: MFF Football Centre; Ulaanbaatar
- Capacity: 5000
- Manager: E. Chinbatar
- League: Women's National Football League
- 2022: 1st
- Website: https://www.facebook.com/STORMFC2022/

Storm Football Club (Mongolian: Сторм FC) is a Mongolian sports club that fields female sides in association football and futsal. It currently competes in the Women's National Football League.

== History ==
The club was founded in 2022. That season, they went on to win the Women's National Football League championship. It went undefeated across eighteen matches with fifteen victories. Team striker Narmandakh Namuunaa won the league Golden Boot that season with eighteen goals in as many matches.

== Roster ==
As of 17 February 2022.

== Honours ==
- National League (1): 2022
