= Paul Watson (football manager) =

British writer and football coach (born 1984)

Personal information
- Full name: Paul Christopher Watson
- Date of birth: 15 June 1984 (age 42)
- Place of birth: Lethbridge, Alberta, Canada

Team information
- Current team: Thimphu City (consultant)

Managerial career
- Years: Team
- 2009–2010: Pohnpei
- 2013–2014: Bayangol
- 2021–: Thimphu City (consultant)

Paul Watson (born 15 June 1984) is a British-Canadian writer and football coach. Once a semi-professional footballer himself, he is best known for serving as coach of the Pohnpei State football team and Federated States of Micronesia national football team in 2009 and 2010, an experience about which he wrote the 2012 book Up Pohnpei. He later moved to Ulaanbaatar, Mongolia to assist in the founding of a new team, Bayangol FC. In 2018, Watson was the lead organiser and tournament director for the CONIFA World Football Cup in London for nations, states and peoples not recognised by FIFA.

== Early life and career ==
Watson was born in Lethbridge, Alberta, Canada. He grew up in Shirehampton and Henleaze, and is a Bristol City F.C. fan. His brother Mark Watson is a comedian. He studied Italian language at the University of Leeds. He would go on to become a sports journalist on the Channel 4 programme Football Italia.

At the age of nine, Watson almost died when he was hit by a car while walking across a pedestrian crossing in Vaduz, Liechtenstein.

=== Coaching on Pohnpei ===
In 2007, Watson and his friend Matt Conrad began looking into the possibility of becoming international footballers by joining a poorly-performing foreign team. At the time, Watson was working on a documentary about the world's weakest football teams. They started their internet research by looking at the results of the team at the bottom of the FIFA rankings at the time, the Guam national football team, and then trying to find which non-FIFA teams Guam had beaten – most notably, the Yap football team with a score of 7–1 – before setting their sights on the sole team which Yap had ever beaten: Pohnpei State Football Team.

Unfortunately for Watson and Conrad, playing for a team in the Federated States of Micronesia would require them to first qualify for naturalisation under the country's strict nationality laws by marrying local women, learning a local language, and living in the country for five years, so they had to give up on that idea. However, the pair soon after decided that they could pursue a similar dream of becoming international football coaches instead, and got in touch with former Pohnpei coach Charles Musana, who had coincidentally just moved to London and initially thought the pair's query was part of a prank. Following two years of negotiations with Micronesian sports officials, Watson was eventually offered the coaching job, and took up his new post in August 2009; he stated that because he "had played to a reasonable standard in England", they were convinced he could perform adequately in his new role. This made him the world's youngest international football coach, beating out previous record-holder Paul Crosbie by two years. However, the position was unpaid.

Watson and Conrad faced many challenges in their new role, including their players' level of physical fitness and addiction to betel leaf, and a toad infestation on their football pitch. Their efforts to set up games against Guam Men's Soccer League teams ran into difficulties with funding for travel; to overcome these difficulties, Watson visited the United Kingdom in an effort to raise sponsorship money for his team. He enlisted his brother Mark to hold a comedy fundraiser for the team. He even wrote to all 92 Premier League and Football League teams in an effort to secure kit donations; among them, only Spurs, Yeovil, and Norwich responded positively. Jim Tobin, secretary-general of the Micronesian Olympic Committee, also provided assistance in efforts to secure funding, but Watson stated that he had even had to pay for some equipment himself. Coyne Airways also provided transportation and sponsorship funds. Watson and Conrad led Pohnpei State on a four-game tour of Guam, which included a victory over Crushers F.C. with a score of 7–1.

=== Up Pohnpei ===
After the end of his coaching career on Pohnpei, Watson went on to write a book about his experiences, Up Pohnpei, while Conrad began raising funds for a documentary on their time on the island, The Soccermen, scheduled for release in 2021. Mark Lomas of ESPN praised Up Pohnpei as a "heartwarming, uplifting antithesis to all that is wrong with the modern game" and contrasted it positively with what he described as "prematurely-released autobiographies from prima donnas keen to detail their difficult Cristal-drinking existences" which dominated football literature at the time. The Big Issue similarly described it as "[f]unny without being condescending or smug" and "a refreshing counterpoint to the commercial excesses of the English Premiership". Nick Dorrington of When Saturday Comes also reviewed it favourably.

Watson sold the film rights to Up Pohnpei to FAR Films and a feature film is currently in development.

=== Bayangol FC career ===
Up Pohnpei also led to Watson's next international coaching opportunity: Enkhjin Batsumber read an article about the book and e-mailed Watson to ask if he would be interested in moving to Mongolia's capital Ulaanbaatar to aid in setting up a new team, New Mongol Bayangol FC. The purpose of the team was to stand against corruption and to develop young homegrown talent who had very limited opportunities in Mongolian football. He moved to the country in late 2013. Bayangol FC were entered in the breakaway Mongolian Premier League which operated outside the main Mongolian Football Federation League. The formation of the team was part of a reality TV show called Dream Team.

In 2014, Watson left Mongolia and was replaced as coach by Jack Brazil.

Watson returned in 2016 as co-owner of Bayangol FC. After a restructure in the Mongolian Football Federation, the team won promotion to the official Mongolian Premier League. British coach Shadab Iftikhar was appointed as coach but the club was unable to avoid relegation.

Beyond the pitch, Bayangol provided a safe haven for African footballers who had been trafficked into Mongolia. The club fought against the common practice from many clubs in Mongolia at the time of employing African players, intentionally allowing their visas to expire, making them illegal immigrants and then refusing to pay their salaries. Bayangol provided housing and a living allowance before assisting these players in leaving the country safely and returning home.

One Bayangol player, Ochiroo Batbold was approached by a fake football agent who claimed to have secured him a trial for Los Angeles Galaxy. The ‘agent’ tricked Ochiroo into transferring around £3,000 which his family had borrowed before disappearing. Watson led a successful crowd-funding in the UK which was able to reimburse Ochiroo in full. Ochiroo now plays for Mongolian champions Ulaanbaatar City FC.

In March 2016, Watson helped bring Mongolian player Ganbayar Ganbold to England to spend a month with Barnet FC. Ganbayar went on to become the first Mongolian ever to sign a professional contract with a top-flight club in Europe when he signed for Puskás Akadémia in August 2018.

Watson left Bayangol FC in 2017 and the club is now a youth football club.

=== CONIFA World Football Cup 2018 ===
Watson was the lead organiser and tournament director for the CONIFA World Football Cup 2018 in London for nations, states and peoples not recognised by FIFA. The tournament, which was the biggest in non-FIFA football history, included teams such as Tibet, Tuvalu and Matabeleland attracted worldwide media attention from over 100 outlets and was staged at 10 non-league football grounds between 30 May and 9 June 2018.

The final between Kárpátalja and Northern Cyprus was played at Enfield Town FC and attracted a record attendance for the stadium.

After the World Football Cup, Watson became Member Development Director, before leaving CONIFA in January 2020.

=== Rohingya FA Cup ===
Working with a Rohingya FA based in the refugee camp in Kutupalong, Bangladesh, and documentary filmmaker Shafiur Rahman, Watson assisted with the organisation of the first ever refugee-led 16-team football competition.

A Gofundme crowdfunder raised over £3000 for the tournament but the planned launch date had to be delayed until 2021 after the onset of COVID-19.

=== Kitmas ===
In November 2020, Paul, his wife Lizzie, his brother Mark Watson and Vix Leyton launched 'Kitmas'; an initiative to collect unwanted football shirts to donate to children in the United Kingdom who may not otherwise receive a Christmas present.

The campaign captured the hearts of the nation in the first year, resulting in over 1000 shirts coming in from all over the UK directly to Paul's home to be redistributed to 15 UK towns and Cities, and raising nearly £9,000. The campaign also attracted media attention, and Paul and Mark were named three and four in the Big Issue's Top 20 Changemakers of 2020.

In 2021 Kitmas was even bigger, raising close to £30,000 and inspiring spin off Kitmas campaigns as far afield as Canada.

=== Thimphu City ===
On 27 October 2021 Bhutan Premier League side Thimphu City confirmed that Watson had joined the club as a Consultant and International Relations Officer. His role was listed as exploring partnerships that encourage the development of players and coaches, promote the club overseas and expand its media profile and also assist with ensuring the club's sustainability and its strategic planning.

== Podcasts ==
Watson has Co-Hosted The Sweeper podcast with Lee Wingate since 2023.

== Works ==
- Up Pohnpei: A Quest to Reclaim the Soul of Football by Leading the World's Ultimate Underdogs to Glory. Profile Books. 2 February 2012. ISBN 978-1846685019.
- Around the World in 80 Clubs. Orion Publishing Co. 14 May 2026. ISBN 978-1399637909.
