= Ilya Kungurov =

Russian footballer

Personal information
- Full name: Ilya Vladimirovich Kungurov
- Date of birth: 26 June 1989 (age 37)
- Height: 1.89 m (6 ft 2 in)
- Position: Goalkeeper

Senior career*
| Years | Team | Apps | (Gls) |
| 2006–2007 | FC Zenit Irkutsk (amateur) | | |
| 2008 | FC Zvezda Irkutsk | 2 | (0) |
| 2009–2010 | FC Zenit-Radian Irkutsk (amateur) | | |
| 2011 | FC Shakhtyor Prokopyevsk (amateur) | | |
| 2012 | FC Zenit-Rekord Irkutsk (amateur) | | |
| 2013 | FC Baikal Irkutsk | 0 | (0) |
| 2016–2021 | FC Zenit Irkutsk | 72 | (0) |
- * Club domestic league appearances and goals

Ilya Vladimirovich Kungurov (Russian: Илья Владимирович Кунгуров; born 26 June 1989) is a Russian former football goalkeeper.

== Club career ==
He made his Russian Football National League debut for FC Zvezda Irkutsk on 14 October 2008 in a game against FC Volga Ulyanovsk.
