= National Amateur Cup (Mongolia) =

Association football league in Mongolia

- Founded: 2014
- Country: Mongolia
- Confederation: AFC
- Number of clubs: Varies
- Level on pyramid: 4
- Promotion to: Mongolian Second League
- Domestic cup: Mongolia Cup
- Current champions: Ulaangom City FC (1st title) (2023/24)

The National Amateur Cup is the fourth tier competition of the football league system in Mongolia. Through the 2019 edition of the tournament, it was known as the National Youth Championship and adopted its current name in 2020. The tournament serves as qualification for the Mongolia Second League.

== List of winners ==
Season	Champions	Runners-up	Ref.
Under-19 Tournament
2014	Bayangol FC		
2015			
2016	Goyo FC		
2017			
2018			
Senior Tournament
2019	BCH Lions	Khad FC	
2020	Khad FC	Hunters FC	
2021/22	FC Kharaatsai	WARD FC	
2022/23	Capitron FC	Irvesuud FC	
2023/24	Ulaangom City FC	Khökh Zapuus FC	
