= New Mongol Bayangol FC =

Association football club in Mongolia

Bayangol
- Full name: New Mongol Bayangol Football Club
- Founded: July 2013; 13 years ago
- Ground: MFF Football Centre; Ulaanbaatar, Mongolia
- Capacity: 3,500
- Website: http://bayangolfc.com/
Home colours	Away colours

New Mongol Bayangol Football Club is a football club based in Ulaanbaatar, Mongolia. They played in the Mongolian Premier League, the highest level of football in Mongolia, making their debut in the 2016 season.

== History ==
Bayangol FC were founded in July 2013, when Paul Watson was contacted by Ulaanbaatar local Enkhjin Batsumber, asking if Watson would be interested in helping to start a new football team in the capital.

In the Summer of 2014, Coventry University student Jack Brazil was appointed as the club's manager.

In May 2016, Bayangol appointed British coach Shadab Iftikhar as their manager for their inaugural Premier League season.

In July 2016, Bayangol signed a MoU with League of Ireland side Limerick.

On 24 August 2016 it was announced the club's name was changed to New Mongol Bayangol FC to reflect a youth development partnership with the New Mongol Academy.

=== Domestic history ===
As of match played 10 September 2016

Season	League									Domestic Cup	Top goalscorer		Managers	Notes
Season	Div.	Pos.	Pl.	W	D	L	GS	GA	P	Domestic Cup	Name	League	Managers	Notes
2016	1st	9th	18	2	3	13	24	57	9				(England) Shadab Iftikhar	Relegated to Mongolia 1st League
2017	2nd	5th	18	9	2	7	49	38	29				(England) Shadab Iftikhar	

== Squad ==
Note: Flags indicate national team as defined under FIFA eligibility rules; some limited exceptions apply. Players may hold more than one non-FIFA nationality.

No.	Pos.	Nation	Player
1	GK	MGL	B. Narmandakh
2	DF	MGL	B. Nyamtseren
3	DF	MGL	G. Burenjargal
4	DF	MGL	B. Munkh-Erdene
5	MF	MGL	G. Batsuren
6	MF	ESP	Adrián García
7	DF	MGL	B. Ochirvaani (Wazza)
8	DF	MGL	U. Sanjaasuren
9	FW	MGL	Kh. Yesun-Erdene (Yesuu)
10	FW	MGL	B. Sanjaadamba
11	FW	MGL	B. Ariunbold (Ariuka)
12	MF	MGL	L. Nasandelger (Naska)
14	MF	MGL	Ch. Ankhbayar

No.	Pos.	Nation	Player
15	DF	ENG	Dean O'Brien
16	DF	MGL	O. Munkhbat
17	DF	MGL	U. Tumurchudur
18	DF	ENG	Henry Smith
20	MF	MGL	S. Usukhbayar
21	GK	MGL	Ts. Enkhjin
22	GK	USA	Zack Downes
23	FW	MGL	D. Shinetsogt
26	FW	MGL	J. Bolorsukh
28	MF	MGL	I. Temuulen
30	MF	MGL	O. Munkhbayar
33	FW	JPN	Seita Ishikawa

As of July 2016

== Honours ==
|1. Champions of the 2015 amateur league| |2. Bronze medal (3rd place) of the 2015 1st league (2nd division)| |3. Bronze medal (3rd place) of the 2015-2016 Futsal Cup|

== Managers ==
Information correct as of match played 10 September 2016. Only competitive matches are counted.

Name	Nat.	From	To	P	W	D	L	GS	GA	%W	Honours	Notes
Paul Watson	England	July 2013		0	0	0	0	0	0	—		
Jack Brazil	England	2014		0	0	0	0	0	0	—		
Ganzo / Jati	Mongolia	Jul 2015		36	23	0	13	144	44	63.89		
Shadab Iftikhar	England	14 May 2016		17	2	3	12	23	50	11.76		

- Notes:

P – Total of played matches W – Won matches D – Drawn matches L – Lost matches GS – Goal scored GA – Goals against
%W – Percentage of matches won

Nationality is indicated by the corresponding FIFA country code(s).

== Affiliated clubs ==
- (Republic of Ireland) Limerick (2016–present)
