= Khad FC =

Association football club in Mongolia

- Founded: 2008
- League: Mongolian First League
- 2024/2025: 9th

Khad FC is a Mongolian football club currently competing in the Mongolian First League.
