= Arvis FC =

Association football club in Mongolia

Arvis Арвис
- Full name: Arvis Football Club
- Founded: 2010; 16 years ago
- Ground: MFF Football Centre; Ulaanbaatar, Mongolia
- Capacity: 5,000
- Manager: Donorovyn Lümbengarav

Arvis Football Club (Mongolian: Арвис FC) is a football club based in Ulaanbataar, the capital of Mongolia. Established in 2010, the club was promoted to the Mongolian Premier League for the first time after winning the Mongolia 1st League in 2017. Their head coach was former Mongolian international and all-time leading goalscorer Donorovyn Lümbengarav.

In addition to its men's team, Arvis FC also organizes a women's team that competes in the Mongolia's women's league.

== Domestic history ==
Season	League							Domestic Cup	Notes
Season	Div.	Pos.	Pl.	W	D	L	P	Domestic Cup	Notes
2015	2nd	6th	9	3	1	5	10		
2016	2nd	5th	18	9	2	7	29		
2017	2nd	1st	18	14	1	3	43		Promoted to Mongolian Premier League
2018	1st	9th	18	2	4	12	10		
