= Mongolian First League =

Association football league in Mongolia

- Founded: 2015; 11 years ago
- Country: Mongolia
- Confederation: AFC
- Number of clubs: 9
- Level on pyramid: 2
- Promotion to: Mongolian Premier League
- Relegation to: Mongolian Second League (formerly)
- League cup: MFF Cup
- Current champions: WARD FC (2025–26)
- Most championships: 12 clubs (1 title each)
- Website: the-mff.mn
- Current: 2025–26 Mongolian First League

The Mongolian First League (also known as the Khurkhree National First League for sponsorship reasons) is the second-highest division of Mongolian football leagues.

== Foundation ==
The Mongolia First League was founded in 2015 by the Mongolian Football Federation.

The league started with the name Khurkhree First League, including the reference to the sponsor in the name, and the first edition was made up of the Continental FC team.

== Stadium ==
Previously all First League matches were played at the MFF Football Centre. As of the 2022 season, some matches are now also played at the Khan-Uul Stadium.

== Current clubs ==
Nine clubs compete in the league as of the 2025/2026 season.

- Bavarians FC
- BCH Lions
- Darkhan City FC
- Deren FC 2
- DMU FC
- Erchim FC
- JustJohn Alliance FC
- Khad FC
- WARD FC

== Champions ==
Season	Champion	Ref.
2015	Continental FC	
2016	Goyo FC	
2017	Arvis FC	
2018	Ulaanbaataryn Mazaalaynuud FC	
2019	Gepro FC	
2020	BCH Lions	
2021	Khovd FC	
2021–22	Khoromkhon FC	
2022–23	Erdenes Ilch FC	
2023–24	Hunters FC	
2024–25	Khovd Western FC	
2025–26	WARD FC	
