= Mongolian Second League =

Association football league in Mongolia

- Founded: 2019; 7 years ago
- Folded: 2024
- Country: Mongolia
- Confederation: AFC
- Number of clubs: 10
- Level on pyramid: 3
- Promotion to: Mongolian First League (formerly)
- Relegation to: National Amateur Cup (formerly)
- Domestic cup: Mongolia Cup
- Last champions: Ulaangom City FC (1st title) (2023–24)
- Most championships: 5 clubs (1 title)

The Mongolian Second League was the third tier competition of the football league system in Mongolia. The league was contested for the first time in 2019 and was controlled by the Mongolian Football Federation.

The league was dissolved following the 2023–24 season with Ulaangom City FC as the league’s final champions.

== Stadium ==
Previously all Second League matches were played at the MFF Football Centre. Beginning with the 2022 season, most matches were played at the Khan-Uul Stadium.

== List of winners ==
Season	Champion	Ref.
2019	BCH Lions	
2020	No season because of COVID-19 pandemic	
2021	Ilch FC	
2021–22	Bavarians FC	
2022–23	Hunters FC	
2023–24	Ulaangom City FC	
