= Geography of women's association football =

Worldwide governing bodies of association football

The following article gives a list of women's association football confederations, sub-confederations and associations around the world. The sport's international governing body is FIFA, but those associations not affiliated with FIFA are also included in this article.

FIFA's World Cup qualification is determined by geographic regions.

== By continent ==
World map of FIFA's six intercontinental governing bodies.

Continent	Governing body			FIFA members	Main continental competition(s)			
Continent	Governing body			FIFA members	Club competition(s)	Most recent Winner	National competition(s)	Most recent Winner
Continent	Name	Abbr.	No. of nations		Club competition(s)	Most recent Winner	National competition(s)	Most recent Winner
Africa	Confederation of African Football	CAF	56	54	CAF Women's Champions League	Mamelodi Sundowns (1st)	Women's Africa Cup of Nations	Cameroon (1st)
Asia	Asian Football Confederation	AFC	47	46	AFC Women's Champions League	Naegohyang (1st)	AFC Women's Asian Cup	Japan (3rd)
Europe	Union of European Football Associations	UEFA	55	All	UEFA Women's Champions League	Barcelona (4th)	UEFA Women's Championship	England (2nd)
North America	Confederation of North, Central American and Caribbean Association Football	CONCACAF	41	35	CONCACAF W Champions Cup	América (1st)	CONCACAF Women's Championship	United States (9th)
Oceania	Oceania Football Confederation	OFC	13	11	OFC Women's Champions League	Auckland United (1st)	OFC Women's Nations Cup	Solomon Islands (1st)
South America	Confederación Sudamericana de Fútbol	CONMEBOL	10	All	Copa Libertadores Femenina	Corinthians (3rd)	Copa América Femenina	Brazil (9th)

== By country ==
=== Africa ===
Country	Sub-Confederation	National team	List of clubs	National association	Main league competition(s)		Main cup competition(s)	
Country	Sub-Confederation	National team	List of clubs	National association	Name	Most recent Winner	Name	Most recent Winner
Algeria	UNAF	National team	Clubs	Algerian Football Federation	Algerian Women's Championship	Afak Relizane (10th)	Algerian Women's Cup	Afak Relizane (7th)
Algeria	UNAF	National team	Clubs	Algerian Football Federation	Algerian Women's Championship	Afak Relizane (10th)	Algerian Women's League Cup	FC Constantine discontinued since 2019
Algeria	UNAF	National team	Clubs	Algerian Football Federation	Algerian Women's Championship	Afak Relizane (10th)	Algerian Women's Super Cup	FC Constantine discontinued since 2016
Angola	COSAFA	National team		Angolan Football Federation	Angolan Women's Football League	Cab-Star (12th)	Taça de Angola (Women)	1º de Agosto (1st)
Angola	COSAFA	National team		Angolan Football Federation	Angolan Women's Football League	Cab-Star (12th)	Supertaça de Angola (Women)	1º de Agosto (1st)
Benin	WAFU-UFOA	National team		Benin Football Federation	Benin Women's Championship	Espoir FC (1st)		
Burkina Faso	WAFU-UFOA	National team		Burkinabé Football Federation	Burkinabé Women's Championship	Colombes de l'USFA (7th)	Burkinabé Women's Cup	Étincelles FC (2nd)
Burkina Faso	WAFU-UFOA	National team		Burkinabé Football Federation	Burkinabé Women's Championship	Colombes de l'USFA (7th)	Burkinabé Women's Super Cup	
Cameroon	UNIFFAC	National team	Clubs	Cameroonian Football Federation	Cameroonian Women's Championship	AS Awa FC (2nd)	Cameroonian Women's Cup; Cameroonian Women's Super Cup	AS Awa FC (2nd)
Cape Verde	WAFU-UFOA	National team		Cape Verdean Football Federation	Cape Verdean Women's Championship	Seven Stars (6th)		
Comoros	COSAFA	National team		Comoros Football Federation	Comorian Women's Championship	FC Ouvanga de Moya (3rd)	Comorian Women's Cup	Ouvanga Espoir (1st)
Djibouti	CECAFA	National team		Djiboutian Football Federation	Djiboutian Women's Championship	Garde Républicaine FF (1st)		
Egypt	UNAF	National team		Egyptian Football Federation	Egyptian Women's Premier League	Wadi Degla (12th)	Egyptian Women's Cup	Wadi Degla discontinued since 2017
Equatorial Guinea	UNIFFAC	National team		Equatoguinean Football Federation	Equatoguinean Primera División femenina	Inter Malabo FC (1st)	Copa de la Primera Dama de la Nación	Deportivo Evinayong discontinued since 2017
Equatorial Guinea	UNIFFAC	National team		Equatoguinean Football Federation	Equatoguinean Primera División femenina	Inter Malabo FC (1st)	Equatoguinean Super Copa femenina	Estrellas de Waiso Ipola discontinued since 2016
Ethiopia	CECAFA	National team		Ethiopian Football Federation	Ethiopian Women's Premier League	Ethiopia Nigid Bank FC (3rd)		
Ghana	WAFU-UFOA	National team	Clubs	Ghana Football Association	Ghana Women's Premier League	Hasaacas Ladies (4th)	Ghana Women's FA Cup	Hasaacas Ladies (1st)
Ivory Coast	WAFU-UFOA	National team		Ivorian Football Federation	Ivory Coast Women's Championship	Africa Sports (1st)	Ivory Coast Women's Cup	Juventus de Yopougon discontinued since 2019
Ivory Coast	WAFU-UFOA	National team		Ivorian Football Federation	Ivory Coast Women's Championship	Africa Sports (1st)	Ivory Coast Women's Federation Cup	Juventus de Yopougon discontinued since 2020
Kenya	CECAFA	National team		Football Kenya Federation	Kenyan Women's Premier League	Vihiga Queens (4th)		
Liberia	WAFU-UFOA	National team		Liberia Football Association	Liberian Women's First Division	Determine Girls FC (2nd)	Liberian FA Women's Cup	Determined Girls (1st)
Libya	UNAF	National team		Libyan Football Federation	Libyan Women's League	Start in 2022		
Malawi	COSAFA	National team		Football Association of Malawi	Malawi Women's League	Blantyre Zero (1st)	Malawi Women's Cup; Malawi Women's Presidential Cup	DD Sunshine (6th)
Mali	WAFU-UFOA	National team		Malian Football Federation	Malian Women's Championship	AS Mandé (2nd)	Malian Women's Cup	Super Lionnes (1st)
Mauritania	WAFU-UFOA	National team		Football Federation of IR Mauritania	Mauritanian Women's Championship	FC Camara discontinued since 2020		
Morocco	UNAF	National team		Royal Moroccan Football Federation	Moroccan Women's Championship	AS FAR (10th)	Moroccan Women Throne Cup	AS FAR (9th)
Namibia	COSAFA	National team		Namibia Football Association	Namibia Women's Super League	Tura Magic Ladies FC (2nd)	Namibia Women's Super Cup	Tura Magic Ladies FC (1st)
Nigeria	WAFU-UFOA	National team	Clubs	Nigeria Football Federation	Nigeria Women Premier League	Bayelsa Queens (5th)	Aiteo Cup	Bayelsa United (1st)
Rwanda	CECAFA	National team		Rwandese Association Football Federation	Rwanda Women's Football League	AS Kigali (11th)		
Senegal	WAFU-UFOA	National team		Senegalese Football Federation	Senegalese Women's Championship	Dakar Sacré-Cœur (1st)	Senegalese Women's Cup	Amazones de Grand Yoff (1st)
Seychelles	COSAFA	National team		Seychelles Football Federation	Seychelles Women's League	Mont Fleuri Rovers (1st)		
South Africa	COSAFA	National team		South African Football Association	SAFA Women's League	Mamelodi Sundowns Ladies (4th)		
South Sudan	CECAFA	National team		South Sudan Football Association	South Sudan Women's National League	Yei Join Stars FC (1st)		
Sudan	CECAFA	National team		Sudan Football Association	Sudanese Women League	Yei Joint Stars (2nd)		
Tanzania	CECAFA	National team		Tanzania Football Federation	Tanzanian Women's Premier League	Simba Queens (3rd)		
Tunisia	UNAF	National team		Tunisian Football Federation	Tunisian Women's Championship	AS Banque de l'Habitat (4th)	Tunisian Women's Cup	ASF Gafsa (1st)
Uganda	CECAFA	National team		Federation of Uganda Football Associations	FUFA Women Super League	She Corporate (1st)		
Zambia	COSAFA	National team		Football Association of Zambia	FAZ Women Super division	Black Rhinos Queens (4th)		

=== Asia ===
Country	Sub-Confederation	National team	List of clubs	National association	Main league competition(s)		Main cup competition(s)	
Country	Sub-Confederation	National team	List of clubs	National association	Name	Most recent Winner	Name	Most recent Winner
Australia	AFF	National team	Clubs	Football Australia	A-League Women	Sydney FC (5th)		
Bangladesh	SAFF	National team	Clubs	Bangladesh Football Federation	Bangladesh Women's League	Bashundhara Kings Women (2nd)		
Cambodia	AFF	National team		Football Federation of Cambodia	Cambodian Women's League	Phnom Penh Crown FC (1st)	Cambodian Women's Cup	SALT Academy discontinued since 2013
China	EAFF	National team		Chinese Football Association	Chinese Women's Super League	Wuhan Jianghan University F.C. (2nd)	Chinese Women's National Championship	Jiangsu L.F.C. discontinued since 2019
China	EAFF	National team		Chinese Football Association	Chinese Women's Super League	Wuhan Jianghan University F.C. (2nd)	Chinese Women's FA Cup	Jiangsu L.F.C. discontinued since 2019
China	EAFF	National team		Chinese Football Association	Chinese Women's Super League	Wuhan Jianghan University F.C. (2nd)	Chinese Women's FA Super Cup	Jiangsu L.F.C. discontinued since 2019
Chinese Taipei	EAFF	National team		Chinese Taipei Football Association	Taiwan Mulan Football League	Taichung Blue Whale (4th)		
Hong Kong	EAFF	National team	Clubs	Hong Kong Football Association	Hong Kong Women League	Happy Valley AA discontinued since 2019		
India	SAFF	National team	Clubs	All India Football Federation	Indian Women's League	East Bengal (1st)		
Indonesia	AFF	National team	Clubs	Football Association of Indonesia	Liga 1 Putri	Persib Putri discontinued since 2019	Pertiwi Cup	Toli Putri (3rd)
Iran	CAFA	National team		Football Federation Islamic Republic of Iran	Kowsar Women Football League	Khatoon F.C (8th)		
Iraq	WAFF	National team		Iraq Football Association	Iraqi Women's Football League	Naft Al-Shamal (1st)		
Japan	EAFF	National team	Clubs	Japan Football Association	WE League	INAC Kobe Leonessa (2nd)	Empress's Cup Tournament	Sanfrecce Hiroshima Regina (1st)
Japan	EAFF	National team	Clubs	Japan Football Association	Nadeshiko League	Orca Kamogawa FC (1st)	WE League Cup	Tokyo Verdy Beleza (1st)
Jordan	WAFF	National team		Jordan Football Association	Jordan Women's Football League	Amman Club (5th)		
(North Korea) Korea DPR	EAFF	National team		DPR Korea Football Association	DPR Korea Women's Premier League	April 25 SC discontinued since 2019		
(South Korea) Korea Republic	EAFF	National team	Clubs	Korea Football Association	WK League	Incheon Hyundai Steel Red Angels (9th)		
Kyrgyzstan	CAFA	National team		Football Federation of the Kyrgyz Republic	Kyrgyzstan Women's Championship	RSDYUSHOR discontinued since 2018		
Lebanon	WAFF	National team	Clubs	Lebanese Football Association	Lebanese Women's Football League	Safa (1st)	Lebanese Women's FA Cup	EFP (1st)
Mongolia	EAFF	National team		Mongolian Football Federation	Mongolian Women's National Football League	Arvis F.C. discontinued since 2017		
Myanmar	AFF	National team		Myanmar Football Federation	Myanmar Women League	ISPE FC discontinued since 2019		
Pakistan	SAFF	National team	Clubs	Pakistan Football Federation	National Women Football Championship	Pakistan Army (2nd)		
Philippines	AFF	National team	Clubs	Philippine Football Federation	PFF Women's League	De La Salle University (3rd)	PFF Women's Cup	Far Eastern University
Saudi Arabia	WAFF	National team		Saudi Arabian Football Federation	Saudi Women's Premier League	Al-Nassr (2nd)	SAFF Women's Cup	Al-Ahli (1st)
Singapore	AFF	National team		Football Association of Singapore	FAS Women's Premier League	Warriors FC (4th)		
Syria	WAFF	National team		Syrian Football Association	Syrian Women's Football League	Fairooza		
Thailand	AFF	National team		Football Association of Thailand	Thai Women's League	BG Bundit Asia (3rd)		
Uzbekistan	CAFA	National team		Uzbekistan Football Association	Uzbek women's football championship	Sogdiyona Jizzak (1st)		
Vietnam	AFF	National team		Vietnam Football Federation	Vietnam women's football championship	Hồ Chí Minh City (10th)	Vietnamese women's national cup	Than Khoáng Sản Việt Nam

=== Europe ===
As of June 2026

Country	National team	List of clubs	National association	Main league competition(s)		Main cup competition(s)	
Country	National team	List of clubs	National association	Name	Most recent Winner	Name	Most recent Winner
Albania	National team	Clubs	Albanian Football Federation	Kategoria Superiore Femra	Vllaznia (13th)	Albanian Women's Cup	Teuta (1st)
Andorra	National team	None	Andorran Football Federation	None	—	None	—
Armenia	National team	Clubs	Football Federation of Armenia	Women's First Division	Noah-Girls	None	—
Austria	National team	Clubs	Austrian Football Association	ÖFB Frauen Bundesliga	FK Austria Wien (1st)	ÖFB Frauen Cup	FK Austria Wien (1st)
Azerbaijan	National team	Clubs	Association of Football Federations of Azerbaijan	AFFA Top Girls League	Neftçi (3rd)	None	—
Belarus	National team	Clubs	Football Federation of Belarus	Belarus Women's Premier League	FC Dinamo Minsk (7th)	Belarusian Women's Cup	FC Dinamo Minsk (4th)
Belgium	National team	Clubs	Royal Belgian Football Association	Belgian Women's Super League	OH Leuven (2nd)	Belgian Women's Cup	RSC Anderlecht (12th)
Bosnia and Herzegovina	National team	Clubs	Football Association of Bosnia and Herzegovina	Bosnia and Herzegovina Women's Premier League	SFK 2000 (24th)	Bosnia and Herzegovina Women's Football Cup	SFK 2000 (21st)
Bulgaria	National team	Clubs	Bulgarian Football Union	Bulgarian Women's League	Ludogorets 1945 (1st)	Bulgarian Women's Cup	—
Croatia	National team	Clubs	Croatian Football Federation	Croatian Women's First Football League	ŽNK Hajduk (1st)	Croatian Women's Football Cup	ŽNK Agram (1st)
Cyprus	National team	Clubs	Cyprus Football Association	Cypriot First Division	Apollon Ladies (16th)	Cypriot Women's Cup	Apollon Ladies (15th)
Czech Republic	National team	Clubs	Football Association of the Czech Republic	Czech Women's First League	Sparta Prague (22nd)	Czech Women's Cup	Sparta Prague (11th)
Denmark	National team	Clubs	Danish Football Association	Danish Women's League	HB Køge (4th)	Danish Women's Cup	HB Køge (1st)
England	National team	Clubs	The Football Association	Women's Super League	Manchester City (2nd)	Women's FA Cup	Manchester City (4th)
Estonia	National team	Clubs	Estonian Football Association	Naiste Meistriliiga	Flora (8th)	Estonian Women's Cup	Saku Sporting (1st)
Faroe Islands	National team	Clubs	Faroe Islands Football Association	1. deild kvinnur	KÍ (24th)	Faroese Women's Cup	B36 (7th)
Finland	National team	Clubs	Football Association of Finland	Kansallinen Liiga	HJK (25th)	Finnish Women's Cup	HJK (19th)
France	National team	Clubs	French Football Federation	Première Ligue	Lyon (19th)	Coupe de France Féminine	Lyon (11th)
(Georgia (country)) Georgia	National team	Clubs	Georgian Football Federation	Georgia women's football championship	Nike Lusso (3rd)	None	—
Germany	National team	Clubs	German Football Association	Frauen-Bundesliga	Bayern Munich (7th)	DFB-Pokal Frauen	Bayern Munich (3rd)
Gibraltar	National team	Clubs	Gibraltar Football Association	Gibraltar Women's Football League	Gibraltar Wave FC/Mons Calpe (1st)	Women's Rock Cup	Gibraltar Wave FC/Mons Calpe (1st)
Greece	National team	Clubs	Hellenic Football Federation	Greek A Division	PAOK (20th)	Greek Women's Cup	PAOK (8th)
Hungary	National team	Clubs	Hungarian Football Federation	Női NB I	Ferencváros (9th)	Hungarian Women's Cup	Ferencváros (7th)
Iceland	National team	Clubs	Football Association of Iceland	Besta deild kvenna	Breiðablik (20th)	Icelandic Women's Football Cup	Valur (15th)
Republic of Ireland	National team	Clubs	Football Association of Ireland, Women's	League of Ireland Women's Premier Division	Athlone Town (2nd)	FAI Women's Cup	Athlone Town (2nd)
Israel	National team	Clubs	Israel Football Association	Ligat Nashim	Hapoel Katamon Jerusalem (1st)	Israeli Women's Cup	Kiryat Gat M.S. (6th)
Italy	National team	Clubs	Italian Football Federation	Serie A	Roma (3rd)	Coppa Italia	Roma (3rd)
Kazakhstan	National team	Clubs	Kazakhstan Football Federation	Kazakhstani women's football championship	Aktobe (1st)	Kazakhstani Women's Cup	Unknown
Kosovo	National team	Clubs	Football Federation of Kosovo	Women's Football Superleague of Kosovo	Mitrovica (7th)	Kosovo Women's Cup	Unknown
Latvia	National team	Clubs	Latvian Football Federation	Latvian Women's League	Riga FC (2nd)	Latvian Women's Cup	Riga FC (1st)
Liechtenstein	National team	Clubs	Liechtenstein Football Association	None	—	none	—
Lithuania	National team	Clubs	Lithuanian Football Federation	Lithuanian Women's A League	Gintra (24th)	Lithuanian Women's Cup	Unknown
Luxembourg	National team	Clubs	Luxembourg Football Federation	Dames Ligue 1	Racing-Union (6th)	Luxembourg Women's Cup	Racing-Union (5th)
Malta	National team	Clubs	Malta Football Association	Maltese Women's League	Mġarr United (1st)	Maltese Women's Cup	Unknown
Moldova	National team	Clubs	Moldovan Football Federation	Moldovan Women's Football Championship	Zimbru Chișinău (1st)	Moldovan Women's Cup	Zimbru Chișinău (1st)
Montenegro	National team	Clubs	Football Association of Montenegro	Montenegrin Women's League	Budućnost (4th)	Montenegrin Cup	Unknown
Netherlands	National team	Clubs	Royal Dutch Football Association	Eredivisie	Twente (10th)	KNVB Women's Cup	Twente (5th)
North Macedonia	National team	Clubs	Football Federation of Macedonia	Macedonian Women's Football Championship	ŽFK Skopje (5th)	Macedonian Women's Football Cup	Unknown
Northern Ireland	National team	Clubs	Irish Football Association	Women's Premiership	Glentoran (11th)	IFA Women's Challenge Cup	Cliftonville (3rd)
Norway	National team	Clubs	Norwegian Football Federation	Toppserien	Brann (3rd)	Norwegian Women's Cup	Vålerenga (4th)
Poland	National team	Clubs	Polish Football Association	Ekstraliga	Pogoń Szczecin (1st)	Polish Cup	Katowice (1st)
Portugal	National team	Clubs	Portuguese Football Federation	Campeonato Nacional Feminino	SL Benfica (6th)	Taça de Portugal Feminina	SL Benfica (3rd)
Romania	National team	Clubs	Romanian Football Federation	Liga I	Farul Constanța (3rd)	Cupa României	FCA Rapid Bucuresti (1st)
Russia	National team	Clubs	Russian Football Union	Russian Women's Football Championship	Spartak Moscow (1st)	Russian Women's Cup	CSKA Moscow (4th)
San Marino	None	Clubs	San Marino Football Federation	None	—	None	—
Scotland	National team	Clubs	Scottish Women's Football	Scottish Women's Premier League	Heart of Midlothian (1st)	Scottish Women's Cup	Celtic (3rd)
Serbia	National team	Clubs	Football Association of Serbia	Serbian Women's Super League	Crvena zvezda (3rd)	Serbian Women's Cup	Crvena zvezda (4th)
Slovakia	National team	Clubs	Slovak Football Association	Slovak Women's First League	Spartak Myjava (5th)	Slovak Women's Cup	Unknown
Slovenia	National team	Clubs	Football Association of Slovenia	Slovenian Women's League	Mura (13th)	Slovenian Women's Cup	Mura (12th)
Spain	National team	Clubs	Royal Spanish Football Federation	Liga F	Barcelona (11th)	Copa de la Reina	Barcelona (12th)
Sweden	National team	Clubs	Swedish Football Association	Damallsvenskan	BK Häcken (2nd)	Svenska Cupen	Hammarby IF (5th)
Switzerland	National team	Clubs	Swiss Football Association	Swiss Women's Super League	Servette (3rd)	Swiss Women's Cup	FC Zürich Frauen (16th)
Turkey	National team	Clubs	Turkish Football Federation	Turkish Women's Football Super League	Fenerbahçe S.K. (2nd)	None	—
Ukraine	National team	Clubs	Ukrainian Association of Football	Ukrainian Women's League	Metalist 1925 Kharkiv (11th)	Ukrainian Women's Cup	Metalist 1925 Kharkiv (12th)
Wales	National team	Clubs	Football Association of Wales	Adran Premier	Wrexham (1st)	FAW Women's Cup	Cardiff City (11th)

=== North, Central America and the Caribbean ===
Country	Confederation	National team	List of clubs	National association	Main league competition(s)		Main cup competition(s)	
Country	Confederation	National team	List of clubs	National association	Name	Most recent Winner	Name	Most recent Winner
Canada	NAFU	National team		Canadian Soccer Association	Northern Super League	Vancouver Rise FC	W Canadian Championship	
Cayman Islands	CFU	National team		Cape Verdean Football Association			Cayman Islands FA Cup	Elite SC (5th)
Costa Rica	UNCAF	National team		Costa Rican Football Federation	Primera División Femenina de Costa Rica	Alajuelense Fútbol (2nd)		
Haiti	CFU	National team		Haitian Football Federation				
Honduras	UNCAF	National team		National Autonomous Federation of Football of Honduras				
Jamaica	CFU	National team		Jamaica Football Federation				
Mexico	NAFU	National team		Mexican Football Federation	Liga MX Femenil	Guadalajara (2nd)	2017 Copa MX Femenil	Pachuca discontinued since 2017
Mexico	NAFU	National team		Mexican Football Federation	Liga MX Femenil	Guadalajara (2nd)	Campeón de Campeones Liga MX Femenil	UANL (1st)
Nicaragua	UNCAF	National team		Nicaraguan Football Federation	Nicaraguan women's football championship	Somotillo FC (1st)		
Panama	UNCAF	National team		Panamanian Football Federation				
United States	NAFU	National team	Clubs	United States Soccer Federation	National Women's Soccer League, USL Super League	Orlando Pride (1st)	NWSL Championship	Orlando Pride (1st)
United States	NAFU	National team	Clubs	United States Soccer Federation	National Women's Soccer League, USL Super League	Orlando Pride (1st)	NWSL Challenge Cup	Washington Spirit (1st)

=== Oceania ===
Country	National team	List of clubs	National association	Main league competition(s)		Main cup competition(s)	
Country	National team	List of clubs	National association	Name	Most recent Winner	Name	Most recent Winner
New Zealand	National team		New Zealand Football	Women's National League	Auckland United (2nd)	Kate Sheppard Cup	Auckland United (2nd)

=== South America ===
Country	National team	List of clubs	National association	Main league competition(s)		Main cup competition(s)	
Country	National team	List of clubs	National association	Name	Most recent Winner	Name	Most recent Winner
Argentina	National team		Argentine Football Association	Campeonato de Fútbol Femenino	Boca Juniors (25th)	Supercopa de Fútbol Femenino	Boca Juniors discontinued since 2015
Argentina	National team		Argentine Football Association	Campeonato de Fútbol Femenino	Boca Juniors (25th)	Superfinal	Boca Juniors (1st)
Argentina	National team		Argentine Football Association	Campeonato de Fútbol Femenino	Boca Juniors (25th)	Copa Federal	UAI Urquiza (1st)
Bolivia	National team		Bolivian Football Federation	Bolivian women's football championship	Real Tomayapo (1st)		
Brazil	National team	Clubs	Brazilian Football Confederation	Campeonato Brasileiro de Futebol Feminino	Sport Club Corinthians Paulista (3rd)	Copa do Brasil de Futebol Feminino	Sport Club Corinthians Audax discontinued since 2016
Chile	National team	Clubs	National Association of Professional Football	Campeonato Femenino Primera División	Club Universidad de Chile (2nd)		
Colombia	National team		Colombian Football Federation	Colombian Women's Football League	Deportivo Cali Femenino (1st)		
Ecuador	National team		Ecuadorian Football Federation	Superliga Femenina	Cuenca (2nd)		
Paraguay	National team		Paraguayan Football Association	Paraguayan women's football championship	Cerro Porteño (7th)		
Peru	National team		Peruvian Football Federation	Liga Femenina	Alianza Lima (1st)		
Uruguay	National team		Uruguayan Football Association	Uruguayan Women's Championship	Defensor Sporting (1st)		
Venezuela	National team		Venezuelan Football Federation	Venezuelan women's football championship	Estudiantes de Caracas (1st)		

== See also ==
- International competitions in women's association football
- List of women's national association football teams
- List of women's association football clubs
- Geography of association football
