= List of women's association football clubs =

This is a partial list of women's association football club teams from all over the world sorted by the confederation, association and league they reside in.

Some clubs do not play in the league of the country in which they are located, but in a neighboring country's league. Where this is the case the club is noted as such.

The top tier world wide competition organized by the FIFA organization that government the football is the FIFA Women's Club World Cup scheduled yearly.

== AFC (Asia) ==
- AFC Women's Champions League

=== Australia ===
Main League: A-League Women

- Adelaide United
- Brisbane Roar
- Canberra United
- Central Coast Mariners
- Melbourne City
- Melbourne Victory
- Newcastle Jets
- Perth Glory
- Sydney FC
- Wellington Phoenix
- Western Sydney Wanderers

=== Bahrain ===
- Bahrain Women's Football League

=== Bangladesh ===
Main league: Bangladesh Women's Football League
List of Bangladesh Women's Football League clubs

- ARB College Sporting Club
- Bangladesh Army FC
- Dhaka Rangers FC
- Farashganj SC
- Jamalpur Kacharipara Akadas
- Nasrin Sporting Academy
- Siraj Srity Songsod
- Suddopuskorini Jubo SC
- Uttara FC

=== Bhutan ===
Main league: Bhutan Women's National League

- Royal Thimphu College Women's FC

=== Cambodia ===
- Cambodian Women's League

=== China ===
Main league: Chinese Women's Super League

- Beijing W.F.C.
- Changchun Public Excellence
- Guangdong
- Henan Jianye
- Hangzhou Bank
- Jiangsu
- Shaanxi Chang'an Athletic
- Shandong Sports Lottery
- Shanghai Commercial Bank
- Sichuan
- Wuhan Jianghan University
- Yongchuan Chashan Zhuhai

=== India ===
Main league: Indian Women's League

- East Bengal
- Gokulam Kerala
- HOPS
- Kickstart
- Odisha
- Sethu
- Sports Odisha

=== Indonesia ===
Main league: Liga 1 Putri

- Arema Putri
- Bali United Women
- Galanita Persipura
- Persebaya Putri
- Persib Putri
- Persija Putri
- PSIS Putri
- PSM Putri
- PSS Putri
- TIRA-Persikabo Kartini

=== Iran ===
Main league: Kowsar Women Football League

- Bam Khatoon

=== Iraq ===
Main league: Iraqi Women's Football League

=== Hong Kong ===
- Hong Kong Women's League

=== Japan ===
Main league: WE League

- Albirex Niigata
- Cerezo Osaka
- Chifure AS Elfen Saitama
- INAC Kobe Leonessa
- JEF United Chiba
- MyNavi Sendai
- Nojima Stella
- Omiya Ardija Ventus
- AC Nagano Parceiro
- Sanfrecce Hiroshima Regina
- Tokyo Verdy Beleza
- Urawa Red Diamonds

=== Jordan ===
- Jordan Women's Pro League

=== Korea Republic ===
Main league: WK League

- Gangjin Swans WFC
- Gyeongju
- Hwacheon KSPO
- Incheon Hyundai Steel Red Angels
- Mungyeong Sangmu
- Sejong Sportstoto
- Seoul City
- Suwon FC

=== Kuwait ===
- Kuwaiti Women's League

=== Laos ===
- Lao Women's League

=== Lebanon ===
Main league: Lebanese Women's Football League

- BFA
- EFP
- Jounieh
- Jwaya
- Mawadda Tripoli
- Nejmeh
- No Limits
- Safa Saad Barouk
- Sanharib

=== Malaysia ===
Main league: Liga Wanita Nasional

- Kelana United
- KL Rangers
- Kuala Lumpur FA
- MBSJ
- Red Eagles
- Sabah FA
- Selangor
- Young Tigress

=== Maldives ===
- FAM Women's League

=== Mongolia ===
- Mongolian Women's League

=== Myanmar ===
- Ayeyarwaddy FC Women
- ISPE FC Women
- Myawady FC Women
- Thitsar Arman FC Women
- Shan United FC Women
- Yangon Royals FC Women
- Yangon United FC Women
- Young Lionesses FC (Myanmar U-16)
- YREO FC (Myanmar U-19)

=== Nepal ===
- APF WFC
- Nepal Police F.C. (women)

=== Pakistan ===
- Balochistan United W.F.C.
- Diya W.F.C.
- Gilgit-Baltistan FA
- Islamabad Football Association
- Jafa W.F.C.
- Karachi Kichers W.F.C.
- Karachi United
- Pakistan Army W.F.C.
- Punjab W.F.C.
- Sports Science W.F.C.
- WAPDA W.F.C.
- Young Rising Stars F.F.C.

=== Philippines ===
- Azurri
- De La Salle Lady Booters
- FEU Lady Tamaraw Booters
- Kaya–Iloilo
- Manila Digger
- Manila Nomads
- Stallion Laguna
- Tuloy F.C.
- UST Lady Booters
- UP Fighting Maroons

=== Qatar ===
- Qatar Women's Football League

=== Saudi Arabia ===
Main league: Saudi Women's Premier League

- Al-Ahli
- Al-Amal
- Al Hilal
- Al-Ittihad
- Al Nassr
- Al Qadsiah
- Al-Shabab
- Al-Taraji
- Al-Ula
- Eastern Flames

=== Singapore ===
Main League: Women's Premier League (Singapore)

- Albirex Jurong
- Balestier Khalsa
- Hougang United
- Geylang International
- Lion City Sailors
- Still Aerion WFC
- BG Tampines Rovers
- Tanjong Pagar United
- Tiong Bahru FC

=== Timor-Leste ===
- Liga Timorense de Futebol Feminino

=== Thailand ===
Main league: Thai Women's League

- Bangkok
- Bangkok Sports School
- BGC Asian Scholars
- Burirat Academy
- Chonburi FA
- Chonburi Sports School
- Hin Khon United
- Kasem Bundit Uni
- Khon Kaen
- MH Nakhonsi

=== Taiwan ===
Main league: Taiwan Mulan Football League

- Hang Yuen
- Hualien
- Kaohsiung Sunny Bank
- Taichung Blue Whale
- Taipei Bravo
- Taoyuan Mars

=== United Arab Emirates ===
- UAE Women's Football League

=== Uzbekistan ===
- Uzbekistan Women's League

=== Vietnam ===
Main league: Vietnamese Women's Football Championship

- Hô Chi Minh City
- Hà Nội I
- Phong Phú Hà Nam
- Thái Nguyen T&T
- Than Khoáng Sản Việt Nam

== CAF (Africa) ==
- CAF Women's Champions League

=== Algeria ===
Main League: Algerian Championship

- Affak Relizane
- ASE Alger-Centre
- AS Oran-Centre
- CLT Belouizdad
- COS Tiaret
- FC Béjaïa
- FC Constantine

=== Angola ===
- Angolan Women's Football League

=== Benin ===
- Benin Women's Championship

=== Botswana ===
- Botswana Women's Championship

=== Burkina Faso ===
- Burkinabé Women's Championship

=== Burundi ===
- Burundi Women's Championship

=== Cameroon ===
- Cameroonian Women's Championship

=== Cape Verde ===
- Cape Verdean Women's Championship

=== Central African Republic ===
- Central Aafricanian Women's Championship

=== Comoros ===
- Comorian Women's Championship

=== Chad ===
- Chadian Women's Championship

=== DR Congo ===
- DR Congo women's football championship

=== Djibouti ===
- Djiboutian Women's Championship

=== Egypt ===
- Egyptian Women's Premier League

=== Equatorial Guinea ===
- Equatoguinean Primera División femenina

=== Eritrea ===
- Eritrean Women's League

=== Eswatini ===
- Eswatini Women's League

=== Ethiopia ===
- Ethiopian Women's Premier League

=== Gabon ===
- Gabonese Women's Championship

=== Gambia ===
- GFF Women's D1

=== Ghana ===
Main League: Ghana Women's Premier League

- Ampem Darkoa Ladies
- Ashtown Ladies
- Berry Ladies
- Fabulous Ladies
- Hasaacas Ladies
- Kumasi Sports Academy Ladies
- Lady Strikers
- Northern Ladies
- Police Ladies
- Soccer Intellectuals Ladies
- Supreme Ladies
- Thunder Queens

=== Guinea ===
- Guinea Women's League 1

=== Guinea-Bissau ===
- Guinea-Bissau Women's Championship

=== Ivory Coast ===
- Côte d'Ivoire Women's Championship

=== Kenya ===
- Kenyan Women's Premier League

=== Lesotho ===
- Lesotho Women's League

=== Liberia ===
- Upper First Division

=== Libya ===
- Libyan Women's League

=== Madagascar ===
- Malagasy Women's Football League

=== Malawi ===
- Malawi Women's League

=== Mali ===
- Malian Women's Championship

=== Mauritania ===
- Mauritanian Women's Championship

=== Mauritius ===
- Mauritian Women's League

=== Morocco ===
Main League: Moroccan Women's Championship D1

- Ain Atiq
- Amjad Taroudant
- Assa Zag
- Chabab Mohammédia
- AS FAR
- FUS
- Ittihad Tanger
- Jawharat Najm Larache
- Municipal Laâyoune
- Raja Aïn Harrouda
- Raja Aït Iaaza
- Raja CA
- Sporting Casablanca
- Wydad AC

=== Mozambique ===
- Mozambican Primera División femenina

=== Namibia ===
- Namibia Women's Super League

=== Niger ===
- Niger Women's Championship

=== Nigeria ===
Main League: Nigerian Championship

- Abia Angels
- Bayelsa Queens
- Confluence Queens
- Delta Queens
- Dream Stars
- Edo Queens
- Ibom Angels
- Nasarawa Amazons
- Osun Babes
- Pelican Stars
- Rivers Angels
- FC Robo
- Royal Queens
- Sunshine Queens

=== Republic of the Congo ===
- Congolese Women's Championship

=== Réunion ===
- Féminine R1

=== Rwanda ===
- Rwanda Women's Football League

=== Saõ Tomé and Príncipe ===
- San Tomé and Príncipe Primera División femenina

=== Senegal ===
- Senegalese Women's Championship

=== Seychelles ===
- Seychelles Women's League

=== Sierra Leone ===
- Marampa Mines League

=== Somalia ===
- Somali Women's National League

=== South Africa ===
- SAFA Women's League

=== South Sudan ===
- South Sudan Women's National League

=== Sudan ===
- Sudanese Women League

=== Tanzania ===
- Tanzanian Women's Premier League

=== Togo ===
- Togolese Women's Championship

=== Tunisia ===
- Tunisian Women's Championship

=== Uganda ===
- FUFA Women Elite League

=== Zambia ===
- FAZ Women's Super Division

=== Zanzibar ===
- Zanzibar Women's Premier League

=== Zimbabwe ===
- Zimbabwean Women's League

== CONCACAF (North and Central America) ==
- CONCACAF W Champions Cup

=== Canada ===
Main League: Northern Super League

Current teams

- AFC Toronto
- Calgary Wild
- Halifax Tides
- Montreal Roses
- Ottawa Rapid
- Vancouver Rise

=== Costa Rica ===
Main League: Primera División Femenina de Costa Rica

Current teams

- Alajuelense
- Coronado
- Dimas Escazú
- Herediano
- AD Pococí
- Saprissa
- Sporting
- Suva Sports

=== El Salvador ===
Main League: Primera División Femenina de El Salvador

Current teams

- Alianza
- Águila
- Santa Tecla
- Once Deportivo
- Limeno
- Jocoro
- Firpo
- Isidro Metapan
- Chalatenango
- Atlético Marte
- Sonsonate
- FAS

=== Guatemala ===
Main League: National Women's Football League of Guatemala

=== Mexico ===
Main League: Liga MX Femenil

Current teams

- América
- Atlas
- Atlético San Luis
- Cruz Azul
- Guadalajara
- Juárez
- León
- Mazatlán
- Monterrey
- Necaxa
- Pachuca
- Puebla
- Querétaro
- Santos
- Tijuana
- Toluca
- Tigres UANL
- UNAM

=== Nicaragua ===
- Nicaraguan women's football championship

=== Panama ===
Main League: Primera División Femenina de Panamá

Eastern Conference

- Alianza
- Atlético Nacional
- CAI
- Chorillo
- CIEX Sports Academy
- Plaza Amador
- Sporting San Miguelito
- Tauro

Western Conference

- Bocas
- Deportivo Chiriquí
- Herrera FC
- Mario Méndez
- Panamá Oeste
- Universitario
- Unión Coclé
- Veraguas United

=== Trinidad & Tobago ===
Current teams

- Sando
- St. Augustine
- Trincity Nationals
- QPCC
- Defence Force
- Police
- UTT
- Jewels
- Tobago Chicas
- St. Augustine Juniors

=== United States ===
Main League: National Women's Soccer League

Current teams

- Angel City
- Bay FC
- Chicago Red Stars
- Gotham FC
- Houston Dash
- Kansas City Current
- North Carolina Courage
- Orlando Pride
- Portland Thorns
- Racing Louisville
- San Diego Wave
- Seattle Reign FC
- Utah Royals
- Washington Spirit

League: USL Super League

Current teams

- Brooklyn FC
- Carolina Ascent FC
- Dallas Trinity FC
- DC Power FC
- Fort Lauderdale United FC
- Lexington SC
- Spokane Zephyr FC
- Tampa Bay Sun FC

== CONMEBOL (South America) ==
- Women's Copa Libertadores

=== Argentina ===
Main League: Campeonato de Futbol Femenino

- Banfield
- Belgrano
- Boca Juniors
- Def. Belgrano
- El Porvenir
- Estudientes
- Estudiantes (LP)
- Excursionistas
- Ferro
- Gimnasia La Plata
- Huracán
- Independiente
- Lanús
- Platense
- Racing Club
- River Plate
- Rosario Central
- San Lorenzo
- SAT
- UAI Urquiza

=== Bolivia ===
Main League: Bolivian women's football championship

=== Brazil ===
Main League: Campeonato Brasileiro de Futebol Feminino Série A1

- Avaí
- Athletico Paranaense
- Atlético Mineiro
- Bahia
- Ceará
- Corinthians
- Cruzeiro
- Flamengo
- Ferroviária
- Grêmio
- Internacional
- Palmeiras
- Real Ariquemes
- Real Brasília
- São Paulo
- Santos

=== Chile ===
Main League: Chilean women's football championship

Current teams (Primera División)

- Colo-Colo
- Coquimbo Unido
- Deportes Iquique
- Deportes Recoleta
- Deportes Temuco
- Huachipato
- Magallanes
- Palestino
- Santiago Wanderers
- Unión Española
- Universidad Católica
- Universidad de Chile
- Universidad de Concepción

Current teams (Primera B)

- Audax Italiano
- Cobreloa
- Cobresal
- Curicó Unido
- Deportes Antofagasta
- Deportes Concepción
- Deportes Copiapó
- Deportes La Serena
- Deportes Limache
- Deportes Puerto Montt
- Deportes Santa Cruz
- Everton
- Ñublense
- O'Higgins
- Rangers
- San Luis de Quillota
- San Marcos de Arica
- Unión La Calera
- Unión San Felipe

Others

- Boston College (2014–2019)
- Fernández Vial
- Deportes Valdivia (2021–2023)
- Santiago Morning (2008–2025)
- Universidad Austral (2013–2019)

=== Colombia ===
Main League: Liga Aguila Femenina

- América
- Atlético Bucaramanga
- Atletico Huila
- Atlético Nacional
- Boyacá Chicó
- Desportes Tolima
- Deportivo Cali
- Deportivo Pasto
- Deportivo Pereira
- Independiente
- Industriales
- Junior
- La Equidad
- Llaneros
- Millionarios
- Real Santander
- Santa Fe

=== Ecuador ===
Main League: Ecuadorian women's football championship

Group 1

- Barcelona
- El Nacional
- Leones del Norte
- Quito
- Universidad Católica
- Ñañas
- Ñusta

Group 2

- Carneras
- Deportivo Ibarra
- Dragonas IDV
- Espuce
- Liga de Quito
- Macará
- Patria

=== Paraguay ===
Main League: Paraguayan women's football championship

- 2 de Mayo
- Cerro Porteño
- General Caballero JLM
- Guaraní
- Libertad Limpeño
- Nacional / Humaita
- Olimpia
- Sol de América
- Sportivo Ameliano
- Sportivo Luqueño
- Sportivo Trinidense
- Tacuary

=== Peru ===
Main League: Primera División Femenina

- Deportiva Cantolao
- Alianza Lima
- Atlético Trujillo
- Ayacucho
- Carlos A. Mannucci
- Defensores del Ilucán
- Deportivo Municipal
- Killas
- Melgar
- Sporting Cristal
- Sporting Victoria
- UCV
- Universidad de San Martín
- Universitario

=== Uruguay ===
Main League: Campeonato Uruguayo Femenino

- Boston River
- Danubio
- Defensor Sporting
- Fénix
- Liverpool
- Montevideo City
- Nacional
- Peñarol
- Racing
- River Plate
- Wanderers

=== Venezuela ===
Main League: Venezuelan Women's Super League

- Grupo Centro Oriental
- Dvo La Guaira
- Caracas F.C.
- Atl. Vzla
- Lala FC
- Estudiantes de Guárico
- Estudiantes de Caracas
- Dvo Anzoátegui
- Grupo Occidental
- Dvo Táchira
- Zamora FC
- Flor de Patria
- Secasports
- Carabobo FC
- Caucheros FC
- Zulia FC

== UEFA (Europe) ==
- UEFA Women's Champions League
- UEFA Women's Europa Cup

=== Albania ===
Main League: Albanian Women's National Championship

- Apolonia
- Egnatia
- Gramshi
- KF Tirana
- FC Kinostudio
- Laçi
- Lushnja
- Partizani Tirana
- Teuta
- Vllaznia

=== Austria ===
Main League: ÖFB-Frauenliga

- Austria Wien
- FC Bergheim
- First Vienna
- Kleinmünchen/BW Linz
- LASK
- SPG FC Lustenau / FC Dornbirn
- SV Neulengbach
- Rheindorf Altach
- SKN St. Pölten
- Sturm Graz

=== Belarus ===
Main League: Premier League

- ABFF U19
- Bobruichanka
- Dynamo Brest
- Dinamo Minsk
- Dnepr Mogilev
- Dyussh-Polesgu
- Gomel
- FC Minsk
- Smorgon
- Vitebsk
- Zorka-BDU

=== Belgium ===
Main League: Super League

- Anderlecht
- Club YLA
- Genk
- Gent
- OH Leuven
- Standard Liège
- Westerlo
- Zulte Waregem

=== Bosnia and Herzegovina ===
Main League: Bosnia and Herzegovina Women's Premier League

- Emina Mostar
- Iskra Bugojno
- Leotar
- Libero
- Radnik Bumerang
- SFK 2000
- Sloboda Tuzla

=== Bulgaria ===
Main League: Bulgarian Women's League

- Dunav Ruse
- Enko Plovdiv
- Etar VT
- Lokomotiv Stara Zagora
- Ludogorets
- NSA Sofia
- Paldin
- Pirin
- Sevlievo Ladies
- Sofia
- Sportika
- Super Sport

=== Croatia ===
Main League: Croatian Women's First Football League

- Agram
- Dinamo Zagreb
- Gorica
- Hajduk
- NŠ Medimurje Čakovec
- Neretva
- Osijek
- Split

=== Cyprus ===
Main League: Cypriot First Division

- Apollon
- Aris Limassol
- Karmiótissa Chrysomiliá
- Lakatamia
- Lefkothea Nicosia
- AC Omonia

=== Czech Republic ===
Main League: Czech First Division (Women)

- FC Praha
- Horní Heršpice
- Pardubice
- Slavia Praha
- Slovan Liberec
- Slovácko
- Sparta Praha
- Viktoria Plzeň

=== Denmark ===
Main League: Danish Women's League

- AGF
- B.93
- Brøndby
- Fortuna Hjorring
- Kolding IF
- HB Køge
- FC Nordsjælland
- OB Q

=== England ===
Main League: FA Women's Super League

- Arsenal
- Aston Villa
- Brighton & Hove Albion
- Chelsea
- Everton
- London City Lionesses
- Leicester City
- Liverpool
- Manchester City
- Manchester United
- Tottenham Hotspur
- West Ham United

Second Division : Women's Super League 2

- Birmingham City
- Bristol City
- Charlton Athletic
- Crystal Palace
- Durham
- Ipswich Town
- Newcastle United
- Nottingham Forest
- Portsmouth
- Sheffield United
- Southampton
- Sunderland

=== Estonia ===
Main League: Naiste Meistriliiga

- Ararat
- FC Flora
- Lootos
- Saku Sporting
- Tabasalu
- Tallinna Kalev
- Tammeka
- Viimsi

=== Faroe Islands ===
Main League: 1. deild kvinnur

- 07 Vestur
- B36 Tórshavn
- HB
- Hoyvik
- KI
- NSÍ
- Skála
- Vikingur

=== Finland ===
Main League: Kansallainen Liiga

- HJK
- HPS
- JyPK
- KuPS
- PK-35
- PK-35 Vantaa
- VIFK
- Åland United

=== France ===
Main League: Première Ligue

- Dijon
- Fleury 91
- EA Guingamp
- Le Havre
- Montpellier HSC
- Nantes
- OL Lyonnes
- Paris FC
- Paris Saint-Germain
- Saint-Étienne
- Stade de Reims
- Strasbourg

=== Germany ===
Main League: Frauen-Bundesliga

- Bayer Leverkusen
- Bayern Munich
- Carl Zeiss Jena
- Eintracht Frankfurt
- Freiburg
- Hamburger SV
- Hoffenheim
- 1. FC Köln
- RB Leipzig
- SGS Essen
- Turbine Potsdam
- Union Berlin
- Wolfsburg
- Werder Bremen

=== Georgia ===
Main League: Georgia women's football championship

- Dinamo Batumi
- Dinamo Sokhumi
- Kolkheti Khobi
- Kvartali
- Lanchkhuti
- FC Martve
- Norchi Dinamoeli
- Samegrelo Chkhorotsku

=== Greece ===
Main League: Greek A Division

- AEK
- Agia Paraskevi
- Asteras Tripolis
- Atromitos
- Doxa Drama
- Kastoria
- Kifisia
- OFI
- Panathinaikos
- PAOK
- REA
- Trikala 2011

=== Hungary ===
Main League: First Division

- Astra Hungary
- Diósgyőri VTK
- Fehérvár
- Ferencvárosi TC
- Győri ETO
- Kelen
- MTK
- Puskás Akadémia
- Szekszárdi
- Szent Mihaly
- Viktória FC
- Újpest

=== Iceland ===
Main League: Úrvalsdeild kvenna

- Breiðablik
- FH
- Fylkir
- Keflavík ÍF
- Stjarnan
- Þróttur Reykjavik
- Þór/KA
- Tindastóll
- Valur
- Víkingur Reykjaík

=== Israel ===
Main League: Ligat Nashim

- ASA Tel Aviv
- Bnot Netanya
- Hapoel Jerusalem
- Hapoel Petah Tikva
- Hapoel Ra'anana
- Kiryat Gat
- Ramat HaSharon
- Maccabi Kishronot Hadera

=== Italy ===
Main League: Serie A

- Como
- Fiorentina
- Inter
- Juventus
- Lazio
- Milan
- Napoli
- A.S. Roma
- Sampdoria
- Sassuolo

Second Division: Serie B

- Arezzo
- Bologna
- Brescia
- Cesena
- Chievo Verona
- Freedom
- Genoa
- Hellas Verona
- Lumezzane
- Meran
- Parma
- Pomigliano
- Res Roma VIII
- San Marino
- Ternana

=== Kazakhstan ===
Main League: Kazakhstani women's football championship

- Aktobe
- BIIK Shymkent
- Okzhetpes
- SDYuSShOR 17
- Turan

=== Kosovo ===
Main League: Women's Football Superleague of Kosovo

- Bazeli
- Dukagjini
- Hajvalia
- Jakova
- Kosova
- Llapi
- Malisheva
- Mitrovica
- KFF Presingu

=== Latvia ===
Main League: Latvian Women's League

- Auda
- Iecava
- Liepāja
- Metta
- Olaine
- Rigas FS
- SFK Rīga
- SK Super Nova

=== Lithuania ===
Main League: A Lyga

- Banga
- FK Vilnius
- FC Gintra
- Hegelmann
- Žalgiris
- Saned

=== Luxembourg ===
Main League: Luxembourg Women's Ligue 1

The following 10 teams are competing in the 2025–26 season:

- Racing FC
- Differdange 03
- Swift Hesperange
- Bettembourg
- SC Ell
- Mamer 32
- Young Boys Diekirch
- Kehlen
- Union "Red Black Red Star Luxembourg"
  - Red Black Luxembourg
  - Red Star Merl-Belair
- Union "Osten"
  - Union Mertert-Wasserbillig
  - Grevenmacher
  - Jeunesse Biwer
  - Victoria Rosport

=== Malta ===
Main League: Maltese First Division (women)

- Birkirkara
- Hibernians
- Lija Athletic
- Mġarr United
- Mtarfa
- San Ġwann
- Swieqi United
- Valletta

=== Moldova ===
Main League: Moldovan women's football championship

- Anenii Noi
- Belceanca
- Nistru
- Noroc Nimoreni
- Rainier
- ȘS No.11 Real Success
- FC ŞS-4-PGU-Legia

=== Montenegro ===
Main League: Montenegrin Women's League

- ŽFK Breznica
- Budućnost Podgorica
- Cvetex
- ŽFK Ekonomist
- Mladost 2015
- Zora

=== Netherlands ===
Main League: Eredivisie (women)

- ADO Den Haag
- Ajax
- AZ
- Excelsior
- Feyenoord
- Fortuna Sittard
- Heerenveen
- PEC Zwolle
- PSV
- Telstar
- Twente
- Utrecht

=== Northern Ireland ===
Main League: Women's Premiership

- Ballymena United
- Cliftonville
- Crusaders Strikers
- Derry City
- Glentoran
- Larne
- Linfield
- Lisburn
- Mid-Ulster
- Sion Swifts

=== North Macedonia ===
Main League: Macedonian women's football championship

- Atletiko
- Borec
- Dragon 2014
- Istatov
- Junajted
- Kamenica Sasa
- Kočani
- Ljuboten
- Plačkovica
- Prilep
- Rečica
- Shkupi 2019
- Shkëndija
- Tiverija
- Top Gol

=== Norway ===
Main League: Toppserien

- Arna-Bjornar
- Avaldsnes IL
- Brann
- LSK Kvinner
- Lyn
- Rosenborg
- Røa IL
- Stabæk
- Vålerenga
- Åsane

=== Poland ===
Main League: Ekstraliga Kobiet

- AP Orlen Gdańsk
- Czarni Sosnowiec
- Górnik Łęczna
- GKS Katowice
- Medyk Konin
- Pogón Szczecin
- Pogoń Tczew
- Rekord Bielsko-Biała
- Stomilanki Olsztyn
- AZS UJ Kraków
- UKS Łódź
- Śląsk Wrocław

=== Portugal ===
Main League: Campeonato Nacional de Futebol Feminino

- Clube de Albergaria
- Damaiense
- Famalicāo
- Marítimo
- Atlético Ouriense
- Racing Power FC
- Benfica
- Braga
- Sporting CP
- Torreense
- Valadares Gaia
- Vitória SC

=== Republic of Ireland ===
- Athlone Town
- Bohemian
- Cork City
- DLR Waves
- Galway
- Peamount United
- Shamrock Rovers
- Shelbourne
- Sligo Rovers
- Treaty United
- Wexford Youths

=== Romania ===
Main League: Liga I

- Banat Girls
- Csíkszereda Miercurea Ciuc
- CSM Alexandria
- Farul Constanța
- Gloria Bistrița
- Târgu Mureș
- Olimpia Cluj
- Politehnica Timişoara

=== Russia ===
Main League: Russian Championship

- CSKA Moscow
- Chertanovo Moscow
- Dynamo Moscow
- Krylia Sovetov
- Krasnodar
- Lokomotiv Moscow
- Rostov
- Rubin Kazan
- Ryazan VDV
- Yenisey Krasnoyarsk
- Zvezda 2005 Perm
- Zenit Saint Petersburg

=== Scotland ===
Main League: SWPL 1

- Aberdeen
- Celtic
- Dundee United
- Glasgow City
- Hamilton Academical
- Hearts
- Hibernian
- Montrose
- Motherwell
- Partick Thistle
- Rangers
- Spartans

Second Division : SWPL 2

- Boroughmuir Thistle
- Gartcairn
- Glasgow
- Kilmarnock
- Livingston
- Queens Park
- St Johnstone
- Stirling University

=== Serbia ===
Main League: Serbian Super Liga

- Crvena Zvezda
- Kanjiža
- Kolubara
- Mašinac Niš
- Požarevac
- Radnički 1923
- Sloga Zemun
- Spartak Subotica
- Vojvodina
- FC Zemun

=== Slovakia ===
Main League: Slovak Women's First League

- Dukla Banská Bystrica
- GFC Regionálna Akadémia
- Petržalka
- Olympia Košice
- Ružomberok
- Slovan Bratislava
- Spartak Myjava
- FC Spartak Trnava Women
- Tatran
- Trenčin
- Žilina

=== Slovenia ===
Main League: Slovenian Women's League

- Cerklje
- Drava Ptuj
- Gažon
- Krim
- Ljubljana
- Mura
- Primorje
- Olimpija Ljubljana
- Radomlje

=== Spain ===
Main League: Liga F

- Athletic Club
- Atlético Madrid
- Barcelona
- Eibar
- Granada
- Granadilla Tenerife
- Levante
- Levante Las Planas
- Madrid
- Real Madrid
- Real Betis
- Real Sociedad
- Sevilla
- Sporting de Huelva
- Valencia
- Villarreal

=== Sweden ===
Main League: Damallsvenskan

- AIK
- Alingsås IF
- Brommapojkarna
- Djurgården
- Hammarby
- BK Häcken
- Kristianstad
- Linkopings
- Malmö FF
- IFK Norrköping
- Piteå
- FC Rosengård
- Vittsjö
- Växjö DFF

=== Switzerland ===
Main League: Axa Women's Super League

- Aarau
- Basel
- Grasshopper
- Luzern
- Rapperswil-Jona
- Servette Chênois
- St. Gallen
- Thun
- Young Boys
- Zurich

=== Turkey ===
Main League: Turkish Women's Football Super League

- 1207 Antalyaspor
- Adana Demirspor
- ALG Spor
- Amed
- Ataşehir Belediyespor
- Beylerbeyi
- Beşiktaş
- Fatih Karagümrük
- Fatih Vatanspor
- Fenerbahçe
- Fomget Gençlik ve Spor
- Galatasaray
- Gaziantep Asya Spor
- Hakkarigücü
- Kdz. Ereğli Belediye Spor
- Trabzonspor

=== Ukraine ===
Main League: Ukrainian Women's League

- EMC Podolie
- Kolos Kovalivka
- Kryvbas
- Ladomyr
- Metalist 1925 Kharkiv
- Obolon Kyiv
- Pantery Uman
- Polissya
- SeaSters Odessa
- Shakhtar Donetsk
- Vorskla Poltava

=== Wales ===
Main League: Adran Premier

- Aberystwyth Town
- Barry Town United
- Briton Ferry
- Cardiff City
- Cardiff Met.
- Swansea City
- The New Saints
- Wrexham

== OFC (Oceania) ==
- OFC Women's Champions League

=== Fiji ===
Main League: Fiji Women's Super League

- Labasa
- Ba
- Suva
- Rewa
- Nadroga
- Tailevu Naitasiri

=== New Zealand ===
Main League: National Women's League

- Auckland Football
- Canterbury United
- Central Football
- Eastern Suburbs
- Ellerslie
- Southern United
- Waterside Karori
- Wellington Phoenix II
- Wellington United
- Western Springs

=== Solomon Islands ===
- Solrais Premier League
