= 2019 in women's association football =

The following are the scheduled events of women's association football for 2019 throughout the world.

== Events ==
=== January ===
- January 14 – Marc Skinner leaves Birmingham City to become Orlando Pride's coach for the 2019 season.
- January 19 – Alen Stajcic is sacked from Australia following an internal survey, with a number of internationals showing their 'shock' over the decision.
- January 21 – Marta Tejedor is appointed Birmingham City's new coach.
- January 27 – Vivianne Miedema breaks FA WSL's annual scoring record with her 16th goal, with seven games still remaining.

=== February ===
- February 18 – Ante Milicic is appointed Australia's coach up to the World Cup.
- February 26 – Martin Sjögren discards the presence of Ada Hegerberg in the World Cup, with the player having renounced to play for Norway since 2017 over differences with NFF.

=== March ===
- March 5 – RFEF claims its rights over the LFP-led Primera División and announces its intention to reform it. ACFF, representing all teams in the category except Athletic Bilbao and Barcelona, rejects the initiative while the media reports the competition may break into two parallel competing championships in the 2019–20 season.
- March 15 – FIFA announces the introduction of VAR in the World Cup, marking the system's first use in women's football.
- March 18 – A crowd of 60,735 see Barcelona beat Atlético Madrid 0–2 in Wanda Metropolitano, setting a new attendance world record in club women's football.
- March 20 – Barclays becomes the first sponsor of the FA WSL starting in the 2019–20 season, with a three-seasons £10 million invest.
- March 27 – Wolfsburg is knocked out of the Champions League by Olympique Lyonnais in a quarterfinals repeat of the previous edition's final, while Chelsea qualifies past PSG with a last-minute goal. Barcelona and Bayern Munich also qualify for the semi-finals.
- March 31 – Chelsea is left with no Champions League-qualifying options but winning the ongoing edition following a home draw against West Ham.

=== April ===
- April 1 – Phil Neville asks the Premier League's leading clubs to open their main stadiums to their women's teams before the end of the season.
- April 4 – Alex Morgan scores her 100th goal for the United States with her opener to a 5–3 win over Australia.
- April 8 – Brazil accumulates nine defeats in a row after losing 1–0 to Scotland.
- April 17 – Alex Morgan is one of six sportspeople included in the 2019 Time 100 list.
- April 28
  - Barcelona becomes the first Spanish team to reach the Champions League's final after beating Bayern Munich in both legs. Three last editions champion Olympique Lyonnais overcomes Chelsea in a close tie.
  - Arsenal wins its 15th national championship title seven years later, also qualifying for the Champions League for the first time since then.

=== May ===
- May 1 – Wolfsburg equals Frankfurt record five consecutive DFB Pokal trophies by defeating Freiburg 1–0 in the final.
- May 2 – Formiga extends at 41 her contract for PSG for one more year.

== International WNT competitions ==
- Inaugural editions are marked in blue. Successful defending champions are marked in yellow.

=== Official ===
Date	Final match venue	Tournament	Champion	Runner up	Third	Fourth
Jan 7 – 15	(Bahrain) Muharraq	WAFF Championship	Jordan	Bahrain	Lebanon	United Arab Emirates
Mar 12 – 22	(Nepal) Biratnagar	SAFF Championship	India	Nepal	Bangladesh and Sri Lanka	
May 5 – 17	(Bulgaria) Albena	UEFA U-17 Championship	Germany	Netherlands	Portugal and Spain	
Jun 7 – Jul 7	(France) Lyon	FIFA World Cup	United States	Netherlands	Sweden	England
Jul 16 – 28	(Scotland) Paisley	UEFA U-19 Championship	France	Germany	Netherlands and Spain	
Jul 25 – Aug 9	(Peru) Lima	Pan American Games	Colombia	Argentina	Costa Rica	Paraguay
Aug 16 – 30	(Morocco) Casablanca	African Games	Nigeria	Cameroon	Morocco	Algeria
Aug 30 – Sep 12	(Cook Islands) Rarotonga	OFC U-19 Championship	New Zealand	New Caledonia	Tahiti	Vanuatu
Sep 15 – 28	(Thailand) Chonburi	AFC U-16 Championship	Japan	North Korea	China	Australia
Oct 27 – Nov 9	(Thailand) Chonburi	AFC U-19 Championship	Japan	North Korea	South Korea	Australia
Dec 10 – 17	(South Korea) Busan	EAFF E-1 Championship	Japan	South Korea	China	Chinese Taipei

=== Invitational ===
Date	Final match venue	Tournament	Champion	Runner up	Third	Fourth
Jan 17 – 20	(China) Meizhou	Four Nations Tournament	China	South Korea	Nigeria	Romania
Feb 9 – 15	(India) Bhubaneswar	Gold Cup	Myanmar	Nepal	India	Iran
Feb 27 – Mar 2	(Cyprus) Limassol	Aphrodite Cup	Cyprus	Malta	Estonia	Lithuania
Feb 26 – Mar 4	(Croatia) Zagreb	Istria Cup	Slovenia	Serbia	Ukraine	Bosnia and Herzegovina
Feb 27 – Mar 5	(Turkey) Alanya	Turkish Cup	France B	Romania	Northern Ireland	Uzbekistan
Feb 27 – Mar 5	(United States) Tampa	SheBelieves Cup	England	United States	Japan	Brazil
Feb 27 – Mar 6	(Portugal) Parchal	Algarve Cup	Norway	Poland	Canada	Sweden
Feb 27 – Mar 6	(Cyprus) Larnaca	Cyprus Cup	North Korea	Italy	Belgium	Austria
Feb 28 – Mar 6	(Australia) Melbourne	Cup of Nations	Australia	South Korea	New Zealand	Argentina
Apr 4 – 7	(China) Wuhan	Wuhan Tournament	China	Cameroon	Russia	Croatia
May 8 – 18	(France) Salon	Sud Ladies Cup	North Korea	Japan	France	Mexico

=== Non-FIFA ===
Date	Final match venue	Tournament	Champion	Runner up	Third	Fourth
Jun 15 – 22	(Anglesey) Holyhead	Inter Games	Isle of Man	Ynys Môn	Jersey	Hitra Municipality

== International club competitions ==
=== Official ===
Date	Final match venue	Tournament	Champion	Runner up	Third	Fourth
7 Aug 2018 – 18 May 2019	(Hungary) Budapest	UEFA Champions League	(France) Lyon ^{(6th)}	(Spain) Barcelona	(Germany) Bayern Munich and (England) Chelsea	
11 – 28 Oct	(Ecuador) Quito	Copa Libertadores	(Brazil) Corinthians ^{(2nd)}	(Brazil) Ferroviária	(Colombia) América	(Paraguay) Cerro Porteño

== National competitions ==
Confederations are ordered by number of slots awarded for the 2019 FIFA Women's World Cup. Successful defending champions are marked in yellow.

=== UEFA ===
	National league		National cup		Other	
Country	Competition	Champion	Competition	Champion	Competition	Champion
Albania	Albanian Championship	Vllaznia ^{(6th)}	Albanian Cup	Vllaznia ^{(6th)}		
Austria	Frauenliga	St. Pölten ^{(5th)}	Ladies Cup	St. Pölten ^{(7th)}		
Belarus	Premier League		Belarusian Cup			
Belgium	Super League	Anderlecht ^{(6th)}	Belgian Cup	Gent ^{(2nd)}		
(Bosnia and Herzegovina) Bosnia and Herz.	Premier League	SFK 2000 ^{(17th)}	BiH Cup	SFK 2000 ^{(15th)}		
Bulgaria	Bulgarian Championship	NSA Sofia ^{(15th)}	Bulgarian Cup			
Croatia	First League	Split ^{(1st)}	Croatian Cup	Split ^{(2nd)}		
Cyprus	First Division	Apollon Limassol ^{(10th)}	Cypriot Cup	Barcelona FA ^{(1st)}	Super Cup	
Czech Republic	First Division	Sparta Prague ^{(20th)}	Czech Cup	Sparta Prague ^{(10th)}		
Denmark	Elitedivisionen	Brøndby ^{(12th)}	Danish Cup	Fortuna Hjørring ^{(9th)}		
England	WSL	Arsenal ^{(15th)}	FA Cup	Manchester City ^{(2nd)}	Women's League Cup	Manchester City ^{(3rd)}
Estonia	Meistriliiga		Estonian Cup	Flora ^{(5th)}		
Faroe Islands	1. deild		Faroese Cup			
Finland	Naisten Liiga		Finnish Cup			
France	Division 1	Lyon ^{(17th)}	Coupe de France	Lyon ^{(10th)}		
(Georgia (country)) Georgia	Georgian Championship					
Germany	Bundesliga	VfL Wolfsburg ^{(5th)}	DFB-Pokal	VfL Wolfsburg ^{(6th)}		
Gibraltar	Women's League	Lincoln Red Imps ^{(3rd)}	Rock Cup			
Greece	A Division	PAOK ^{(14th)}	Greek Cup			
Hungary	Női NB I	Ferencváros ^{(3rd)}	Hungarian Cup	Ferencváros ^{(5th)}		
Iceland	Úrvalsdeild		Icelandic Cup			
Israel	Ligat Nashim	ASA Tel Aviv University ^{(8th)}	Israeli Cup	ASA Tel Aviv University ^{(5th)}		
Italy	Serie A	Juventus ^{(2nd)}	Coppa Italia	Juventus ^{(1st)}	Supercoppa Italiana	
Kazakhstan	Kazakhstani Championship		Kazakhstani Cup			
Kosovo	Women's League	Mitrovica ^{(2nd)}	Kosovo Cup			
Latvia	Latvian League		Latvian Cup			
Lithuania	A-Lyga		Lithuanian Cup			
Luxembourg	Ligue 1	Bettembourg ^{(2nd)}	Luxembourg Cup	Racing FC ^{(1st)}		
Malta	First Division	Birkirkara ^{(8th)}	Maltese Cup	Birkirkara ^{(15th)}		
Moldova	Top League	Agarista-ȘS Anenii Noi ^{(2nd)}	Moldovan Cup	Agarista-ȘS Anenii Noi ^{(2nd)}		
Montenegro	Montenegrin League	Breznica ^{(4th)}	Montenegrin Cup			
Netherlands	Eredivisie	Twente ^{(6th)}	KNVB Cup	Ajax ^{(4th)}		
North Macedonia	Macedonian Championship		Macedonian Cup			
Northern Ireland	Women's Premiership		Challenge Cup			
Norway	Toppserien		Norwegian Cup			
Poland	Ekstraliga	Górnik Łęczna ^{(2nd)}	Polish Cup	Medyk Konin ^{(9th)}		
Portugal	Campeonato Nacional	Braga ^{(1st)}	Taça de Portugal	Benfica ^{(1st)}		
Republic of Ireland	WNL		FAI Cup		WNL Cup	
Romania	Liga I	Olimpia Cluj ^{(9th)}	Romanian Cup	Vasas ^{(1st)}		
Russia	Russian Championship		Russian Cup			
Scotland	SWPL		SWF Cup		SWPL Cup	Hibernian ^{(7th)}
Serbia	SuperLiga	Spartak Subotica ^{(9th)}	Serbian Cup	Spartak Subotica ^{(7th)}		
Slovakia	First League	Slovan Bratislava ^{(14th)}	Slovak Cup			
Slovenia	Women's League	Pomurje ^{(7th)}	Slovenian Cup	Pomurje ^{(9th)}		
Spain	Primera División	Atlético Madrid ^{(3rd)}	Copa de la Reina	Real Sociedad ^{(1st)}		
Sweden	Damallsvenskan		Svenska Cupen	Kopparbergs/Göteborg ^{(3rd)}		
Switzerland	Nationalliga A	Zürich ^{(22nd)}	Swiss Cup	Zürich ^{(14th)}		
Turkey	First League	Beşiktaş ^{(1st)}				
Ukraine	Ukrainian League		Ukrainian Cup			
Wales	Premier League	Cardiff Met ^{(6th)}	FAW Cup	Cardiff Met ^{(3rd)}		

=== AFC ===
	National league		National cup		Other	
Country	Competition	Champion	Competition	Champion	Competition	Champion
Australia	W-League	Sydney FC ^{(3rd)}				
China PR	Super League		Chinese Championship		Chinese FA Cup	
China PR					Super Cup	
Chinese Taipei	Mulan League					
Hong Kong	Hong Kong League					
India	Indian Women's League					
Iran	Kowsar League					
Jordan	Jordan League					
Japan	L. League		Empress's Cup		High School Tournam.	Seisa Kokusai ^{(1st)}
Lebanon	Lebanese League	SAS ^{(3rd)}				
North Korea	DPRK League					
South Korea	WK League					
Myanmar	Myanmar League					
Philippines	PFF League					
Singapore	National League					
Thailand	Thai League					
United Arab Emirates	UAE League					
Uzbekistan	Uzbek Championship		Uzbek Cup		Uzbek Super Cup	
Vietnam	Vietnam Championship					

=== CONCACAF ===
	National league				National cup / Intercollegiate league	
Country	Main	Champion	Other	Champion	Competition	Champion
Barbados	Premier League					
Canada					U Soccer	
Costa Rica	Primera División					
Cuba	Liga Nacional					
El Salvador	Apertura	Alianza				
El Salvador	Clausura					
Guatemala	Apertura					
Guatemala	Clausura					
Haiti	CHFF					
Jamaica	JFF League					
Martinique	Martinican Championship				Coupe de Martinique	
Mexico	2018–19's Clausura					
Mexico	2019–20's Apertura					
Nicaragua	Apertura	UNAN Managua				
Nicaragua	Clausura					
Panama	Liga Nacional					
Puerto Rico	LPR					
United States	NWSL		WPSL		NCAA	
United States			UWS			

=== CAF ===
	National league		National cup	
Country	Competition	Champion	Competition	Champion
Algeria	LFF	Sûreté Nationale ^{(1st)}		
Benin	Benin Championship			
Burkina Faso	Première Division	Etincelles ^{(1st)}		
Cameroon	Division 1		Coupe du Cameroun	
Cape Verde	Cape Verde Championship			
Comoros	Comoros Championship			
(Republic of the Congo) Congo	Congo Championship		Congo Cup	
Egypt	Premier League			
Eswatini	Eswatini Championship		Swazi Bank Cup	
(The Gambia) Gambia	Gambian Championship			
Ghana	National League		Ghanaian FA Cup	
Guinea			Guinean Tournament	Horoya
Ivory Coast	Ivory Coast Championship			
Kenya	Premier League			
Lesotho	Super League			
Liberia	Liberian Championship			
Malawi			Presidential Cup	
Mozambique	National League			
Namibia	Super League			
Nigeria	Premier League		Aiteo Cup	
Rwanda	First Division			
Senegal	Senegal Championship		Senegal Cup	
South Africa	2019 Sasol League			
Togo	Togo Championship			
Tunisia	Tunisian Championship		Tunisian Cup	
Uganda	Elite League		FUFA Cup	
Zambia	Charity Shield			
Zimbabwe	Zimbabwe League			

=== CONMEBOL ===
	National league	
Country	Main	Champion
Argentina	Campeonato Argentino	
Bolivia	Campeonato Boliviano	
Brazil	Campeonato Brasileiro	
Chile	Campeonato Chileno	
Colombia	Liga Colombiana	
Ecuador	Campeonato Ecuatoriano	
Paraguay	Campeonato Paraguayo	
Peru	Campeonato Peruano	
Uruguay	Campeonato Uruguayo	
Venezuela	Apertura	
Venezuela	Clausura	

=== OFC ===
	National league		National cup	
Country	Main	Champion	Main	Champion
American Samoa	National League			
Cook Islands	Round Cup			
Fiji	Senior League			
New Zealand	National League		Kate Sheppard Cup	
