= Women's Championship (disambiguation) =

The Women's Championship is the second-highest division of women's football in England.

Women's Championship may also refer to:

- AFC Women's Championship
- African Women's Championship
- Algerian Women's Championship, the highest division of women's football in Algeria
- Arab Rugby Sevens Women's Championship
- Asia Rugby Women's Championship
- ASEAN Women's Championship, a football competition organized by the ASEAN
- Burkinabé Women's Championship
- CECAFA Women's Championship, a football competition organized by CECAFA
- CONCACAF Women's Championship, a football competition organized by CONCACAF
- COSAFA Women's Championship, a football competition organized by COSAFA
- Côte d'Ivoire Women's Championship
- Djiboutian Women's Championship
- ICC Women's Championship, an international cricket tournament by ICC
- IWGP Women's Championship
- Kyrgyzstan Women's Championship
- Los Angeles Women's Championship, a golf tournament on the LPGA Tour
- Malian Women's Championship
- Mauritanian Women's Championship
- Mexican National Women's Championship
- Moroccan Women's Championship, the highest division of women's football in Morocco
- NXT Women's Championship, a professional wrestling championship by the WWE
- Oceania Rugby Women's Championship
- Pinewild Women's Championship, a golf tournament on the LPGA Tour
- SAFF Women's Championship, a football competition organized by SAFF
- Tunisian Women's Championship, the highest division of women's football in Tunisia
- UEFA Women's Championship, a European association football competition
- UEFS Futsal Women's Championship, a European futsal competition
- WAFF Women's Championship, a football competition organized by WAFF
- WWE Women's Championship, a professional wrestling world championship

== See also ==
- Women's championships in WWE
- World Women's Championship (disambiguation)
