= Women's World Tag Team Championship =

Professional wrestling championship

A Women's World Tag Team Championship is a professional wrestling championship for tag teams consisting of two female wrestlers. Several wrestling companies have promoted a world women's tag team championship including:

== List of Women's World Tag Team Championships ==
=== Active ===
| Championship | Promotion | Years | Notes |
|---|---|---|---|
| NWA World Women's Tag Team Championship | (United States) NWA | 1952–1983; 2021–present | The title is considered the first women's world tag team championship. The title's lineage ended when its rights were acquired by WWF in 1983. The title was revived in 2021. |
| Mexican National Women's Tag Team Championship | (Mexico) Consejo Mundial de Lucha Libre | 1990–present | |
| AAAW Tag Team Championship | Gaea Japan | 1996–present | |
| International Ribbon Tag Team Championship | (Japan) Ice Ribbon | 2007–present | |
| Oz Academy Tag Team Championship | (Japan) Oz Academy | 2008–present | |
| Daily Sports Women's Tag Team Championship | (Japan) Pure-J | 2008–present | |
| TNA Knockouts World Tag Team Championship | (United States) TNA Wrestling | 2009–present | |
| Goddesses of Stardom Championship | (Japan) World Wonder Ring Stardom | 2011–present | |
| Wave Tag Team Championship | (Japan) Pro Wrestling Wave | 2011–present | |
| Shine Tag Team Championship | (United States) Shine Wrestling | 2014–present | |
| Asia Dream Tag Team Championship | (Japan) Gatoh Move Pro Wrestling | 2016–present | |
| Beyond the Sea Tag Team Championship | (Japan) Seadlinnng | 2018–present | |
| WWE Women's Tag Team Championship | (United States) WWE | 2018–present | |
| Pro-Wrestling: EVE Tag Team Championship | (United Kingdom) Pro-Wrestling: EVE | 2019–present | |
| CMLL World Women's Tag Team Championship | (Mexico) Consejo Mundial de Lucha Libre | 2023–present | |
| Marigold Twin Star Championship | (Japan) Dream Star Fighting Marigold | 2024–present | |
| AEW Women's World Tag Team Championship | (United States) All Elite Wrestling | 2025-present | |

=== Retired ===
| Championship | Promotion | Years | Notes |
|---|---|---|---|
| WWWA World Tag Team Championship | All Japan Women's Pro-Wrestling | 1971–2005 | |
| WWF Women's Tag Team Championship | (United States) WWF | 1983–1989 | WWF bought the rights to the NWA World Women's Tag Team Championship and established it as the WWF Women's Tag Team Championship. The title was abandoned due to a lack of women's tag team and was succeeded by the WWE Women's Tag Team Championship in 2019. |
| AJW Tag Team Championship | All Japan Women's Pro-Wrestling | 1986–2005 | |
| UWA World Women's Tag Team Championship | (Mexico) Universal Wrestling Association | 1992–2003 | Established and defended in Japan. |
| JWP Tag Team Championship | (Japan) JWP Joshi Puroresu | 1992–2017 | Unified with the Daily Sports Women's Tag Team Championship in 2017. |
| Twin Star of Arsion Championship | (Japan) Hyper Visual Fighting Arsion | 1998–2003 | |
| Shimmer Tag Team Championship | (United States) Shimmer Women Athletes | 2008–2021 | |
| Reina World Tag Team Championship | (Japan) Reina Joshi Puroresu | 2011–2018 | |
| NXT Women's Tag Team Championship | (United States) WWE | 2021–2023 | When the title was created in March 2021, it was given a world championship status due to WWE promoting NXT as its third brand at the time. The title lost its world championship status in September of the same year after WWE reverted NXT as a developmental brand. The title was unified into the WWE Women's Tag Team Championship in June 2023. |
| WSU Tag Team Championship | (United States) Women Superstars United | 2008–2020 | |

== See also ==
- World Women's Championship (disambiguation)
- Women in WWE
- TNA Knockouts
- World Wonder Ring Stardom
- Shine Wrestling
- :Category of more: Women's professional wrestling tag team championships
