= 2021–22 Qatar Women's Football League =

Qatar Women's Football League
- Season: 2021–2022
- Dates: 11 December 2021 – 23 March 2022
- Champions: Al-Khor
- Matches: 15
- Goals: 56 (3.73 per match)
- Best player: (Jordan) Shahnaz Jebreen
- Top goalscorer: (Sweden) Cecilia (6 goals)
- Best goalkeeper: (Qatar) Shaima AlSiyabi
- All statistics correct as of 19 August 2022.

The 2021–22 Qatar Women's Football League, was the X edition of top-level women's football championship in Qatar. The league kicked off on 27 December 2021 and ended on 27 March 2022. Al-Khor won the league, having won all of their matches. All matches were played at Qatar Women's sports committee stadium.

== Teams ==
=== Personnel and kits ===
| Club | Coach | Captain | Kit manufacturer | Shirt sponsor |
|---|---|---|---|---|
| Al-Ahli | | | Puma | Regency Group Holding |
| Al-Gharafa | (Qatar) Fedha Al-Abdullah | | Puma | N/A |
| Al-Rayyan | (Tunisia) Asma Zarrouk | | Puma | Baladna; Mall of Qatar |
| Al-Sadd | (Jordan) Hiba Mousa Bader | | New Balance | Qatar Airways |
| Qatar SC | | | Macron | N/A |
| Al-Khor | (Qatar) Aya Al-Jardi | | Adidas | N/A |

== League Table ==
| Pos | Team | Pld | W | D | L | GF | GA | GD | Pts | Final result | AKSC | ASSC | AGSC | QASC | ARSC | AASC |
|---|---|---|---|---|---|---|---|---|---|---|---|---|---|---|---|---|
| 1 | Al-Khor SC | 5 | 5 | 0 | 0 | 16 | 0 | +16 | 15 | Champions | — | | | | 7–0 | |
| 2 | Al Sadd SC | 5 | 4 | 0 | 1 | 11 | 5 | +6 | 12 | Runners-up | 0–2 | — | 3–1 | | | |
| 3 | Al-Gharafa SC | 5 | 2 | 1 | 2 | 13 | 6 | +7 | 7 | Third place | 0–2 | | — | | | 1–1 |
| 4 | Qatar SC | 5 | 1 | 1 | 3 | 8 | 18 | −10 | 4 | | 0–1 | 1–3 | 0–11 | — | | 3–3 |
| 5 | Al-Rayyan SC | 5 | 1 | 0 | 4 | 3 | 16 | −13 | 3 | | | 1–4 | | 0–4 | — | 2–1 |
| 6 | Al-Ahli SC | 5 | 0 | 2 | 3 | 5 | 11 | −6 | 2 | | 0–4 | 0–1 | | | | — |

Source: QWSC

=== Matches ===
27 December 2021
17:00 UTC+3

| Al Sadd SC | 0–2 | Al Khor SC |
|---|---|---|
| | Report |

27 December 2021
18:45 UTC+3

| Al-Rayyan SC | 2–1 | Al-Ahli SC |
|---|---|---|
| | Report |

28 December 2021
17:00 UTC+3

| Qatar SC | 0–11 | Al-Gharafa SC |
|---|---|---|
| | Report |

3 January 2022
--:-- UTC+3

| Al Sadd SC | 3–1 | Al-Gharafa SC |
|---|---|---|
| | Report |

2 March 2022
--:-- UTC+3

| Al-Khor SC | 7–0 | Al-Rayyan SC |
|---|---|---|
| | Report |

2 March 2022
--:-- UTC+3

| Qatar SC | 3–3 | Al-Ahli SC |
|---|---|---|
| | Report |

7 March 2022
--:-- UTC+3

| Al-Ahli SC | 0–1 | Al Sadd SC |
|---|---|---|
| | Report |

7 March 2022
--:-- UTC+3

| Al-Rayyan SC | 0–4 | Qatar SC |
|---|---|---|
| | Report |

9 March 2022
--:-- UTC+3

| Al-Gharafa | 0–2 | Al-Khor SC |
|---|---|---|
| | Report |

14 March 2022
--:-- UTC+3

| Al-Gharafa SC | 1–1 | Al-Ahli SC |
|---|---|---|
| | Report |

14 March 2022
--:-- UTC+3

| Qatar SC | 0–1 | Al-Khor SC |
|---|---|---|
| | Report |

16 March 2022
--:-- UTC+3

| Al-Rayyan SC | 1–4 | Al Sadd SC |
|---|---|---|
| | Report |

21 March 2022
--:-- UTC+3

| Al-Ahli SC | 0–4 | Al-Khor SC |
|---|---|---|
| | Report |

21 March 2022
--:-- UTC+3

| Qatar SC | 1–3 | Al Sadd SC |
|---|---|---|
| | Report |

--:-- UTC+3

| Al-Gharafa SC | v | Al-Rayyan SC |

== See also ==
- 2020–21 Qatar Stars League
