= List of women's football clubs in Hong Kong =

This is a list of women's football clubs in Hong Kong.

- Hong Kong Football Club
- Kitchee
- Citizen
- Tai Po
- Resource Capital
- Hong Kong Baptist University
- Hong Kong Wonderful FC
- TSL
- Wong Tai Sin
- WSE
- Wing Go
- Happy Valley
- Shatin

APSS (Asia Pacific Soccer Schools), KCC (Kowloon Cricket Club) Youth football for girls aged 5–18yrs.

== See also ==
- List of women's football clubs
