= Mary Dawa =

South Sudanese footballer

Personal information
- Full name: Mary Dawa Marko
- Place of birth: South Sudan
- Position: Midfielder

Senior career*
Years	Team	Apps	(Gls)
- Yei Joint Stars

International career
- South Sudan
- * Club domestic league appearances and goals

Mary Dawa Marko is a South Sudanese footballer who plays as a midfielder for the South Sudan women's national football team.

== Early life ==
Dawa played netball as a child. Dawa attended Mukono High School in Uganda.

== Club career ==
Dawa played for South Sudanese side Yei Joint Stars in CAF Champions League qualification.

== International career ==
Dawa played for the South Sudan women's national football team in the team's first friendly.

== Style of play ==
Dawa mainly operates as a midfielder and has been described as an "excellent crosser of the ball with lung-bursting runs down the flank customary of most wing players and a great executor of set pieces".

== Personal life ==
Dawa's father was initially against her playing football.
