= Football team =

Group of football players

A football team is a group of players selected to play in a team sport known as football on their own initiative or paid by a third party, challenging another football team (their opponents). Such football teams could represent a football club or multi-sports club, a group such as an enterprise or organization (factory, mine, trade union, collective farm, military unit), city or region (e.g., London XI, Madrid, others), state or nation (e.g., national football team, Olympic football team, under-19 football team), an all-star team. Also, a hypothetical team (such as a dream team or team of the century) could be selected and never play an actual match. As in any sport, a football team is often gender-dependent, with mixed-gender teams usually playing in a hobby-like manner.

The difference between a football team and a football club is incorporation; a football club is often a commercial legal entity which is formed and governed by a committee and has members which may consist of supporters in addition to players, coaches, and other administrative staff (medics, clerics, security, facility custodians, others). The benefit of club formation is that it gives teams access to additional volunteer or paid support staff, facilities and equipment.

== Summary ==
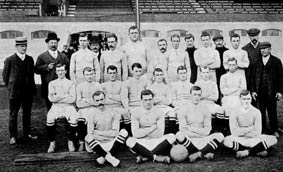
Chelsea's football squad in 1905 pictured with support staff

There are several varieties of football, including association football, gridiron football, Australian rules football, Gaelic football, rugby league and rugby union. The number of players selected for each team, within these varieties and their associated codes, can vary substantially. Sometimes, the word "team" may be limited to those who play on the field in a match and does not always include other players who may take part as replacements or emergency players. "Football squad" may be used to be inclusive of these support and reserve players.

The words team and club are sometimes used interchangeably by supporters, typically referring to the team within the club playing in the highest division or competition. A football club is a type of sports club which is an organized or incorporated body. Typically these will have a committee, secretary, president, or chairperson, registrar and members. Football clubs typically have a set of rules, including rules under which they play and are themselves typically members of a league or association which are affiliated with a governing body within their sport. Clubs may field multiple teams from their registered players (which may participate in several different divisions or leagues). A club is responsible for ensuring the continued existence of its teams in their respective competitions. The oldest football clubs date back to the early 19th century. While records exist for most incorporated clubs, they do not exist for all football clubs. Standalone clubs are usually run like businesses and appear on official registers. However many football clubs were formed as part of larger organisations (schools, athletic clubs, societies) and therefore public records of their formation and operation may not be kept unless they compete with other teams. Football clubs may also be dormant for periods and be re-formed (for example going into recess for reasons such as war or lack of a league or competition to participate in) and even switch between football codes. Likewise, a football club may fold if it becomes insolvent or is incapable of fielding a team to play matches.

== Variation of player numbers among football codes ==
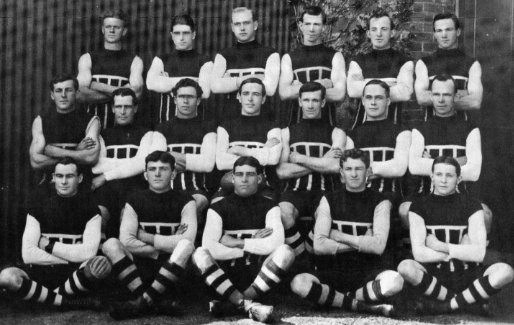
The 18 senior players of Port Adelaide Football Club's 1914 Champions of Australia team

The number of players that take part in the sport simultaneously, thus forming the team are:

- Association football: 11
  - Seven-a-side football:7
  - Indoor soccer: 5–7
  - Futsal, Beach soccer, Five-a-side football: 5
- American football: 11
  - Arena football: 8
- Canadian football: 12
- Rugby league: 13
  - Rugby league nines: 9
- Rugby union: 15
  - Rugby sevens: 7
- Gaelic football: 15
- Australian rules football: 18

== Lists of association football teams ==
- Lists of association football clubs
- List of women's association football clubs
- List of men's national association football teams
- List of women's national association football teams

== Lists of Australian rules football teams ==
- List of Australian rules football clubs in Australia

== See also ==
- Football club (association football)
- Football club (East Germany)
