= World Women's Championship =

World Women's Championship may refer to:

== Professional wrestling ==
=== Active ===
- AAA Reina de Reinas Championship
- AEW Women's World Championship
- AEW TBS Championship
- CMLL World Women's Championship
- GHC Women's Championship
- ICE Cross Infinity Championship
- ICW Women's Championship
- IWGP Women's Championship
- Marigold World Championship
- MLW World Women's Featherweight Championship
- NWA World Women's Championship
- NXT Women's Championship
- ROH Women's World Championship
- ROH Women’s World Television Championship
- ROH Women’s Pure Championship
- Shine Championship
- SWA World Championship
- TNA Knockouts World Championship
- World of Stardom Championship
- World Woman Pro-Wrestling Diana World Championship
- Women's World Championship (WWE)
- WWE Women's Championship
- WWE Evolve Women’s Championship
- WWE Women’s Intercontinental Championship
- WWE Women’s Speed Championship
- WWE Women’s United States Championship
- WWE Women’s ID Championship
- NXT Women’s North American Championship
- HOG Women's Championship
- MLP Women's Canadian Championship

=== Retired ===
- AWA World Women's Championship
- Women's World Championship (original)
- WWE Women's Championship (original)
- WWE Divas Championship
- Women of Honor World Championship
- Shimmer Championship

== Other ==
- Women's World Chess Championship
- IHF World Women's Handball Championship
- World Women's Curling Championship
- IIHF World Women's Championship (ice hockey)

== See also ==
- Women's Championship (disambiguation)
- Women's World Tag Team Championship (disambiguation)
- Women in WWE
- Women of Honor
- TNA Knockouts
- World Wonder Ring Stardom
- New Japan Pro-Wrestling
- :Category of more: Women's professional wrestling championships
