= Yei Joint Stars F.C. =

Yei Joint Stars FC
- Full name: Yei Joint Stars Football Club
- Founded: 2019
- Stadium: Yei Freedom Square
- Capacity: 5000
- Founders: The football Lovers of Yei
- Chairperson: Malish John Peter
- Head Coach: Esther Paul Khamis
- League: South Sudan Women's National League
| Home colours | Away colours |

Yei Joint Stars FC is a professional women's football club in Yei, South Sudan. The team is a founding member of the South Sudan Women's National League, which was launched by the South Sudan FA in 2019. The Yei Joint Stars FC participated in the CECAFA Women's Championship in 2021 and 2022.

== Location ==
The club is located in Yei town, Yei River County

== Awards ==
- South Sudan Women League Champions: 2021, 2022

== Players ==
- Luka Deborah, striker
- Mary Dawa, midfielder, played in CAF Champions League qualification
