= Malagasy Women's Football League =

Highest division of league competition for Madagascar women's football

- Founded: 2010; 16 years ago
- Country: Madagascar
- Confederation: CAF
- Level on pyramid: 1
- International cup: CAF Champions League
- Current champions: Disciples FF (1st title) (2022–23)
- Most championships: ASKAM (3 titles)

The Malagasy Women's Championship is the highest level of league competition for women's football in Madagascar. It is the women's equivalent of the men's Botswana Premier League. Starting with the 2021, the league champion will qualify for the CAF Women's Champions League.

== Champions ==
The list of champions and runners-up:

Year	Champions	Runners-up
2023	Disciples FF	ASCUF
