= Guinea-Bissau Women's Championship =

Highest division of league competition for Botswana women's football

- Founded: 2002; 24 years ago
- Country: Guinea-Bissau
- Confederation: CAF
- Number of clubs: 33
- Level on pyramid: 1
- International cup: CAF Champions League
- Current champions: Mavegro FC (8th title) (2022–23)
- Most championships: Mavegro FC (8 titles)
- Current: 2026

The Guinea-Bissau Women's Championship is the highest level of league competition for women's football in Guinea-Bissau. It is the women's equivalent of the men's Campeonato Nacional da Guiné-Bissau. Starting with the 2021, the league champion will qualify for the CAF Women's Champions League.

== List of Champions ==
Season	Champion
2003	Darling
2004	Sporting Clube da GuinÈ-Bissau
2005	Sporting Clube da GuinÈ-Bissau
2006	not held
2007	not held
2008	not held
2009	Clube de Futebol "Os Balantas" de MansÙa
2010	Mavegro FC
2011	FC Canchungo
2012	Mavegro FC
2013	Mavegro FC
2014	Mavegro FC
2015	Mavegro FC
2016	Mavegro FC
2017	Mavegro FC
2018	Mavegro FC
2019	Sport Bissau e Benfica
2020	Buja Queens
2021	Sport Bissau e Benfica
2022	FB-TÈnis Clube
2023	Academia Sociedade Desportiva
