= Gabonese Women's Championship =

national first division championship
- Founded: 2023
- Country: GAB
- Confederation: CAF
- Number of clubs: 12
- Relegation to: Regional Championships
- International cup: CAF W-Champions League
- Current: 2026

The Gabonais Women's Championship (French: Championnat du Gabon féminin), called national first division championship (French: championnat national de première division), is the top flight of women's association football in Gabon. The competition is run by the Gabonese Football Federation.

== History ==
March 31, 2023 was the official launch date of the national championship of the first division, organized by the National League of Women's Football (LINAFEM). This competition, which is fully funded by the Gabonese government through the Ministry of Youth and Sports, will feature 12 teams divided into two groups of six.

== Champions ==
The list of champions and runners-up:

Year	Champions	Runners-up
2023		
