= Qatar Women's Football League =

Top-tier football league in Qatar

- Founded: 2012; 14 years ago
- Country: Qatar
- Confederation: AFC
- Number of clubs: 6
- Current champions: Al-Khor (2021–22)

The Qatar Women's Football League (Arabic: دوري السيدات لكرة القدم القطري) is the main women's football tournament in Qatar. It currently features six teams, and is played as one round-robin with the top team after all matches winning the league.

== History ==
The Qatar Women's Football League was first organized by the Qatar Women's Sports Committee and Qatar Football Association. It was founded in 2012 to promote and improve women's football in the country.

== Teams ==
- Al Sadd
- Al-Khor
- Al-Gharafa
- Qatar
- Al-Ahli
- Al-Rayyan

== Results ==
=== By season ===
Season	Winners	Runners-up	Third Place	Top goalscorer	Goals
2020	Seashore	Lusail City	Qatar	Kholoud Al-Jassim (Qatar)	
2021–22	Al-Khor	Al Sadd	Al-Gharafa	(Sweden) Cecilia (Al-Gharafa)	6
2022–23					
2023–24					

== See also ==
- Qatar women's national football team
