= Comorian Women's Cup =

- Founded: 2007
- Region: Comoros
- Current champions: Ouvanga Espoir (1st title)
- Most championships: 4 clubs (1 title each)
- 2020–21 W-Cup

The Comorian Women's Cup (Arabic: كأس جزر القمر للسيدات) is a women's association football competition in Comoros. pitting regional teams against each other. It was established in 2007. It is the women's equivalent of the Comoros Cup for men. The last winners was FC Ouvanga Espoir de Moya in 2021.

== Finals ==
Year	Winners	Score	Runners-up	Venue
2007–08	Étoile du Centre de Salamani	–		
2008–09	Maman Club de Moroni	9–0	Étoile du Centre de Salamani	Stade Said Mohamed Cheikh, Mitsamiouli
2009–10		–		
2010–11		–		
2011–12		–		
2012–13		–		
2013–14		–		
2014–15		–		
2015–16		–		
2016–17		–		
2017–18		–		
2018–19	FC Ouvanga Espoir de Moya	5–1	Maman Club de Moroni	
2019–20	cancelled because of the COVID-19 pandemic in Comoros			
2020–21	FC Ouvanga Espoir de Moya	2–0	FC Inanga	Stade El Hadj Ahmed Mattoir, Fomboni

== See also ==
- Comorian Women's Championship
