= Mauritian Women's League =

Highest division of league competition for Mauritius women's football

- Founded: 2002; 24 years ago
- Country: Mauritius
- Confederation: CAF
- Level on pyramid: 1
- International cup: CAF Champions League
- Most championships: AS Quatre-Bornes (8 titles)

The Mauritian Women's League is the highest level of league competition for women's football in Mauritius. It is the women's equivalent of the men's Mauritian Premier League. Starting with the 2021, the league champion will qualify for the CAF Women's Champions League.

== Champions ==
The list of champions and runners-up:

Year	Champions	Runners-up
2025	Plaisance Spoutnik Ladies	

== Top goalscorers ==
Season	Player	Team	Goals
2024	(Mauritius) Devishree Ramsurrun	Quatre Bornes	24
2025	(Mauritius) Eloisha Claire	Plaisance SL	25
2026	(Mauritius) Eloisha Claire	GRSE Wanderes	25
