= List of women's football clubs in Nigeria =

This is a list of women's football clubs in Nigeria. NWFL Premiership (formerly Nigeria Women Premier League) is the highest division for female football in Nigeria. NWFL Championship (formerly Nigeria Women Pro-league) and NWFL Nationwide leagues are on the second and third tier on the pyramid respectively. This list is valid for the 2016 football season. Women Amateur Football Association (WAFU) is an independent amateur league for women's football in the country.

== List ==
As of 2024

=== Nigeria Women Premier League teams ===
Team	State	Reference (s)
Adamawa Queens	Adamawa State	
Abia Angels	Abia State	
Bayelsa Queens	Bayelsa State	
Dannaz Ladies	Lagos State	
Delta Queens	Delta State	
Edo Queens	Edo State	
Ekiti Queens	Ekiti State	
Heartland Queens	Imo State	
Naija Ratels	Abuja	
Nasarawa Amazons	Nasarawa State	
Osun Babes	Osun State	
Remo Stars Ladies	Ogun State	
Rivers Angels	Rivers State	
Robo Queens	Lagos State	
Royal Queens	Delta State	
Sunshine Queens	Ondo State	

=== NWFL Championship ===
Team	State	References
Delta Babes	Delta State	
DreamStar Ladies	Lagos State	
Ghetto Tigers Ladies	Odi-Olowo/Ojuwoye Lagos State	
Heartland Queens	Imo State	
Honey Badgers FC	Abuja	
Imo Striker Queens	Imo State	
Kwara Ladies	Kwara State	
Lakeside FA		
Moje Queens	Kwara State	
Prince Kazeem Eletu Queens		

=== Women Amateur Football Association teams ===
Team	Founded	State	References
Adex Queens		Ikotun, Lagos State	
Jagunmolu Queens		Idiroko, Ogun State	
Yaba Queens		Yaba, Lagos State	
Oluyole Flamming Queens		Ibadan, Oyo State	
FC Phoenix		Apapa, Iganmu, Lagos State	
Nana Babes		Ore, Ondo State	

=== Defunct teams ===
Team	Founded	State	References
Jegede Babes			
Taraba Queens F.C.		Taraba State	
Ufuoma Babes			
C.O.D F.C. Ladies			
Tokas Queens F.C.		Lagos State	
Martin White Doves F.C.		Edo State	
Capital City Doves F.C.		Abuja	
Simbiat Abiola Babes		Abeokuta	
