= List of Austrian women's soccer teams =

The following is a list of Austrian women's soccer teams:

== First division ==
Season	Team	Notes
2010/11	FC Südburgenland	
2010/11	SV Neulengbach	Champion and cup-holder of the 2009/10 season
2010/11	SK Kärnten Frauen	
2010/11	FC Wacker Innsbrück	
2010/11	FC Stattegg	
2010/11	USK Hof	
2010/11	LUV Graz	
2010/11	Union Kleinmünchen	Promoted
2010/11	USC Landhaus	
2010/11	USG Ardagger/Neustadtl	

== Second Division ==
Season	Region	Team
2010/11	Central/West	HSV Wals
2010/11	Central/West	FC Wacker Innsbruck 1b
2010/11	Central/West	FC Lustenau
2010/11	Central/West	FC Wels
2010/11	Central/West	Union Geretsberg
2010/11	Central/West	SV Garsten
2010/11	Central/West	Union Kleinmünchen 1b
2010/11	Central West	Lask Ladies
2010/11	Central/West	ASKÖ Dionysen
2010/11	East	ASV Spratzern
2010/11	East	SKV Altenmarkt Frauen
2010/11	East	SV Neulengbach Juniors
2010/11	East	SV Gloggnitz
2010/11	East	SV Horn
2010/11	East	ASK Erlaa
2010/11	East	USC Landhaus 1b
2010/11	East	ASV Hornstein
2010/11	East	SV Groß-Schweinbarth
2010/11	East	SV Furth
2010/11	East	SV Guntramsdorf
2010/11	South	DFC Leoben
2010/11	South	FC Südburgenland 1b
2010/11	South	St. Ruprecht/R.
2010/11	South	SC/ESV Parndorf
2010/11	South	LUV/Mariatrost Frauen II
2010/11	South	FC Feldkirchen
2010/11	South	Spittal/Drau

== Other Divisions ==
The 3rd, 4th and 5th divisions are organized by the local football associations from the various federal states.

== Gallery ==
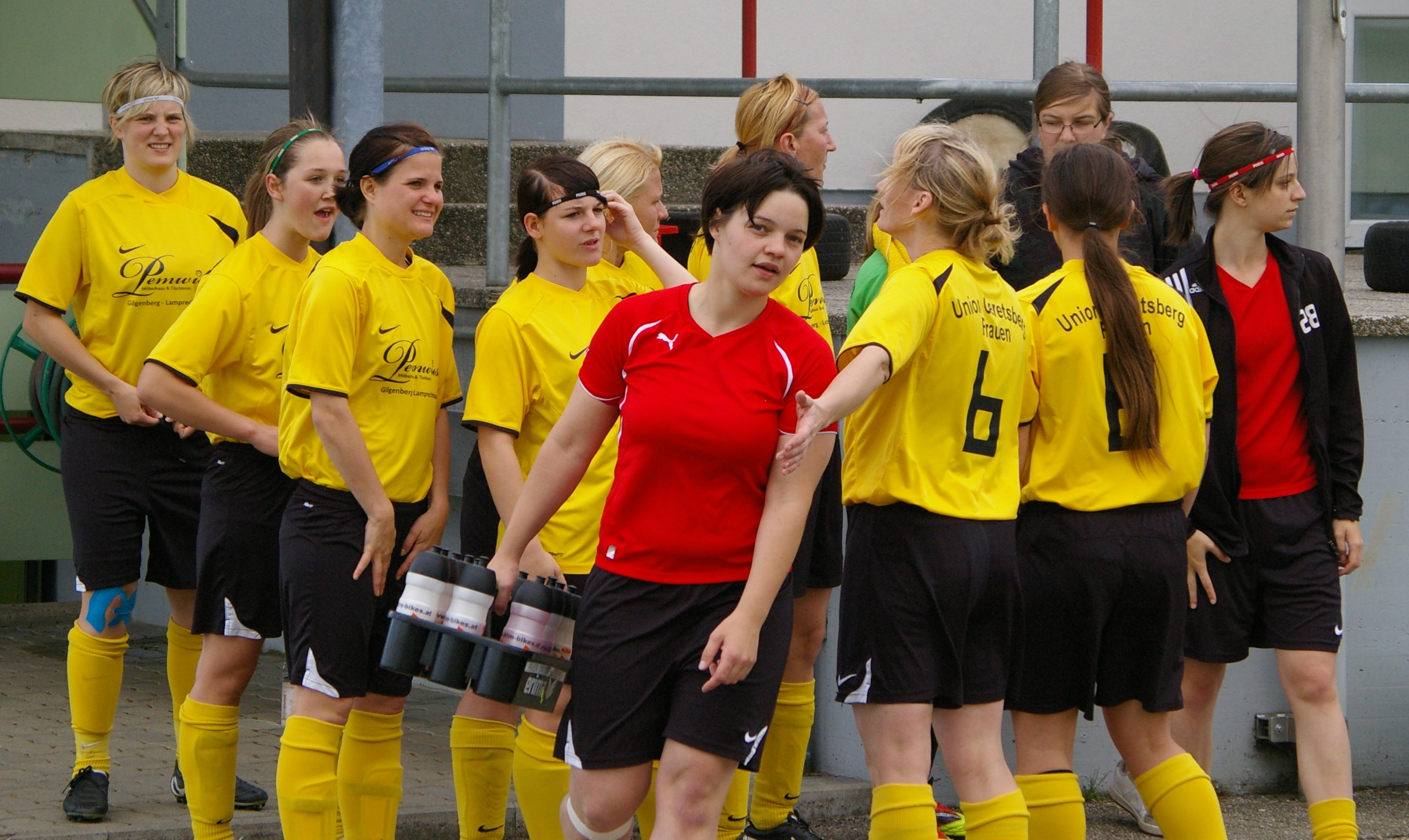
Union Geretsberg 2.Liga West

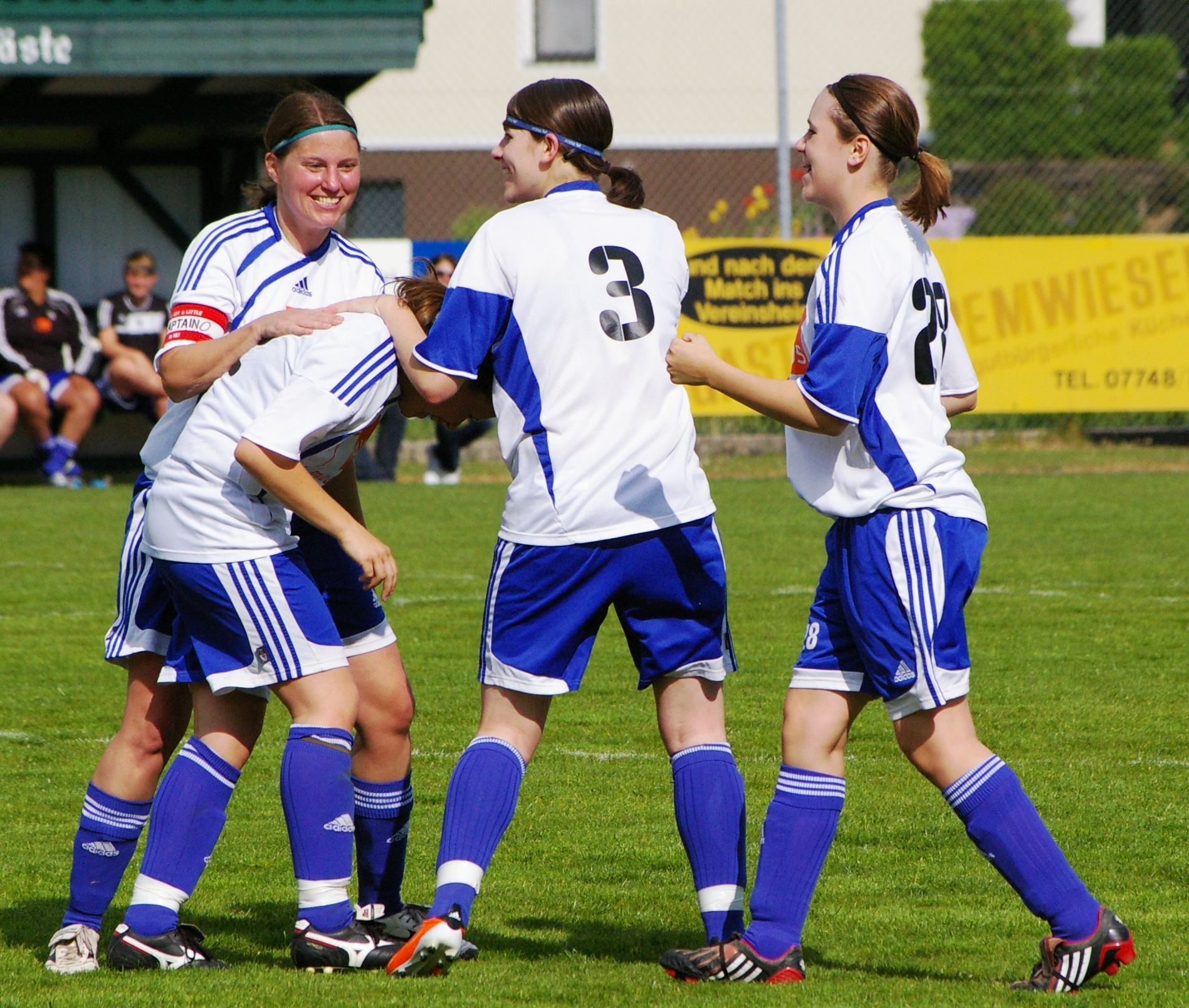
Heeressportverein Wals 2. Liga West celebrating a goal

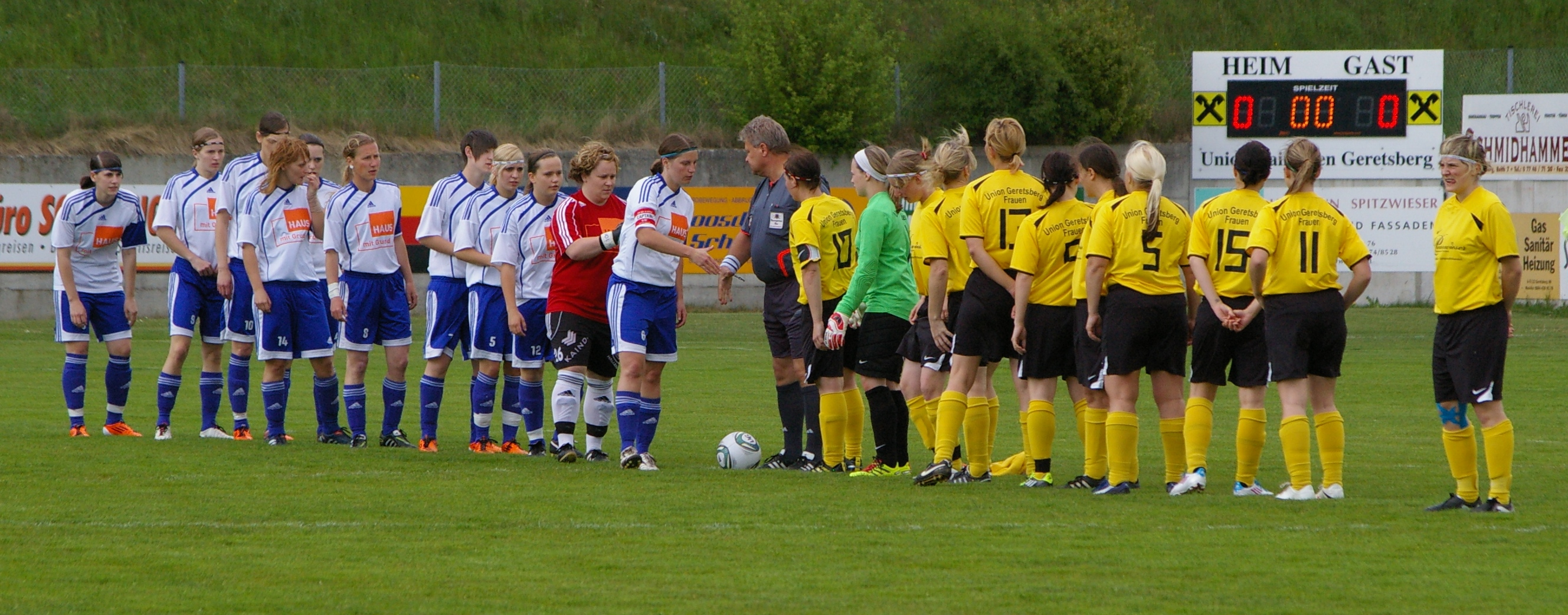
HSV Wals vs. Union Geretsberg

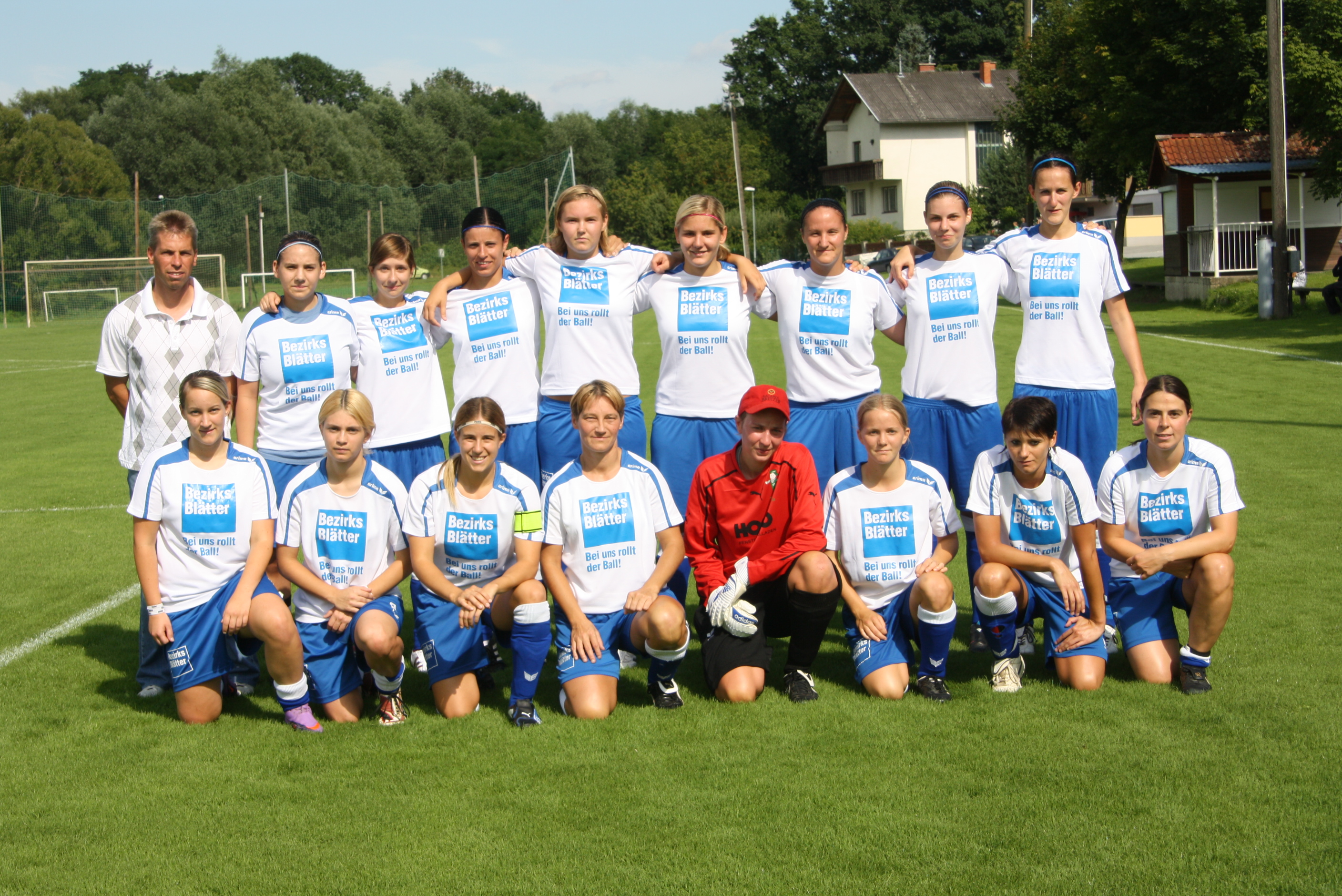
FC Südburgenland ÖFB-Frauenliga
