= 2019 Chinese FA Women's Cup =

Tournament details
- Country: China
- Dates: 16 March 2019 – 22 June 2019
- Teams: 18

The 2019 Chinese FA Women's Cup (Chinese: 2019年中国足球协会杯(女子)) is the 13th edition of the Chinese FA Women's Cup. Jiangsu Suning are the defending champions. It is held from 16 March to 22 June 2019.

== First round ==
16 March 2019	Yunnan Jiashijing	0–3	Chongqing	Hongta Sports Center Field 4, Kunming
15:00

17 March 2019	Donghua University	0–0 (1–4 p)	Shaanxi	Donghua University Football Field, Shanghai
15:00

Hebei Olé Elite	w/o	Qinhuangdao BSU

Guangdong Meizhou Huijun	w/o	Beijing Sports University

== Second round ==
22 March 2019	Sichuan	1–2	Henan Huishang
15:00

22 March 2019	Hebei China Fortune	1–2	Wuhan Jianghan University
15:00

22 March 2019	Chongqing	0–2	Changchun Rural Commercial Bank
15:00

23 March 2019	Jiangsu Suning	5–0	Hebei Olé Elite
15:00

23 March 2019	Shaanxi	0–3	Beijing BG Phoenix
15:00

23 March 2019	Guangdong Meizhou Huijun	1–0	Dalian Quanjian
15:00

23 March 2019	PLA	2–2 (3–0 p)	Zhejiang
15:00

23 March 2019	Shandong Sports Lottery	0–1	Shanghai
15:00

== Quarter-finals ==
6 April 2019	Changchun Rural Commercial Bank	1–1 (3–4 p)	Shanghai
15:00

7 April 2019	Jiangsu Suning	4–1	Henan Huishang
15:00

7 April 2019	Beijing BG Phoenix	0–1	Wuhan Jianghan University
15:00

7 April 2019	PLA	0–1	Guangdong Meizhou Huijun
15:00

== Semi-finals ==
=== 1st leg ===
27 April 2019	Wuhan Jianghan University	0–6	Jiangsu Suning

28 April 2019	Guangdong Meizhou Huijun	0–3	Shanghai

=== 2nd leg ===
Jiangsu Suning	–	Wuhan Jianghan University

Shanghai	–	Guangdong Meizhou Huijun

== Finals ==
=== 1st leg ===
–

=== 2nd leg ===
–
