= Sudan Football Association =

Governing body of association football in Sudan

Sudan Football Association الاتحاد السوداني لكرة القدم
- Sport: Football
- Jurisdiction: Sudan
- Abbreviation: SFA
- Founded: 1936
- Affiliation: FIFA (1948); CAF (1957); UAFA (1978)
- Headquarters: Khartoum
- President: Mutasim Jaafar Sarkhatm
- Vice president: Osama Atta Elmanan Hassan

Official website
- www.sfa.sd
- (Sudan)

The Sudan Football Association (S.F.A.) (Arabic: الإتحاد السوداني لكرة القدم) is the governing body of football in Sudan. It was established in 1936 and affiliated with FIFA in 1948. Along with the national associations of Egypt, Ethiopia and South Africa, the Sudan Football Association was one of the founding members of the Confederation of African Football (CAF) in 1957. The International Federation of Football Associations, FIFA, decided to suspend the activities of the Sudan Football Association (SFA) starting from Friday 30 June 2017. The suspension was lifted on Thursday 13 July 2017.

== Presidential history ==
- Abdel Halim Muhammad
- Mohammed Talat Fareed
- Mamoun Mubark Aman
- Kamal Shaddad (1988–1995)
- Omer Al Bakri Abu Haraz (1995–2001)
- Kamal Shaddad (2001–2010)
- Mutasim Jaafar Sarkhatm (2010–2017)
- Kamal Shaddad (2017–2021)
- Mutasim Jaafar Sarkhatm (2021–present)

== National Teams ==
Men

- Sudan national football team
- Sudan national under-23 football team
- Sudan national under-20 football team
- Sudan national under-17 football team

Women

- Sudan women's national football team
- Sudan women's national under-20 football team
- Sudan women's national under-17 football team

== Competitions ==
Men

- Sudan Premier League
- Sudan Cup

Women

- Sudanese Women League
