= 2019 Chinese Women's Football Championship =

Tournament details
- Country: China
- Dates: 27 February–13 May 2019
- Teams: 20

The 2019 Chinese Women's Football Championship (Chinese: 2019年中国女子足球锦标赛) is the 29th edition of the Chinese Women's Football Championship. Jiangsu Suning are the defending champions. It will be held from 27 February to 13 May 2019.

== First round ==
=== Group A ===
Pos	Team	Pld	W	D	L	GF	GA	GD	Pts
1	Beijing BG Phoenix	3	2	1	0	11	2	+9	7
2	Wuhan Jianghan University	3	2	1	0	7	3	+4	7
3	Shaanxi	3	1	0	2	3	5	−2	3
4	Chongqing	3	0	0	3	3	14	−11	0

Rules for classification: 1) Points; 2) Goal difference; 3) Goals scored

27 February 2019	Beijing BG Phoenix	9–1	Chongqing	Haigeng Football Base, Kunming
10:00

27 February 2019	Wuhan Jianghan University	3–1	Shaanxi	Haigeng Football Base, Kunming
10:00

2 March 2019	Shaanxi	0–1	Beijing BG Phoenix	Haigeng Football Base, Kunming
16:00

2 March 2019	Chongqing	1–3	Wuhan Jianghan University	Haigeng Football Base, Kunming
16:00

5 March 2019	Beijing BG Phoenix	1–1	Wuhan Jianghan University	Haigeng Football Base, Kunming
10:00

5 March 2019	Shaanxi	2–1	Chongqing	Haigeng Football Base, Kunming
10:00

=== Group B ===
Pos	Team	Pld	W	D	L	GF	GA	GD	Pts
1	Dalian Quanjian	3	2	1	0	12	0	+12	7
2	Shandong Sports Lottery	3	2	1	0	10	0	+10	7
3	Donghua University	3	1	0	2	4	7	−3	3
4	Yunnan Jiashijing	3	0	0	3	0	19	−19	0

Rules for classification: 1) Points; 2) Goal difference; 3) Goals scored

27 February 2019	Dalian Quanjian	4–0	Donghua University	Haigeng Football Base, Kunming
10:00

27 February 2019	Shandong Sports Lottery	7–0	Yunnan Jiashijing	Haigeng Football Base, Kunming
10:00

2 March 2019	Yunnan Jiashijing	0–8	Dalian Quanjian	Haigeng Football Base, Kunming
16:00

2 March 2019	Donghua University	0–3	Shandong Sports Lottery	Haigeng Football Base, Kunming
16:00

5 March 2019	Dalian Quanjian	0–0	Shandong Sports Lottery	Haigeng Football Base, Kunming
10:00

5 March 2019	Yunnan Jiashijing	0–4	Donghua University	Haigeng Football Base, Kunming
10:00

=== Group C ===
Pos	Team	Pld	W	D	L	GF	GA	GD	Pts
1	Changchun Rural Commercial Bank	3	2	1	0	16	4	+12	7
2	Shanghai	3	1	2	0	5	2	+3	5
3	Sichuan	3	1	1	1	5	4	+1	4
4	Beijing Sports University (Note: Beijing Sports University withdrew from the competition after their first match.)	3	0	0	3	0	16	−16	0

Rules for classification: 1) Points; 2) Goal difference; 3) Goals scored
Notes:

27 February 2019	Changchun Rural Commercial Bank	10–0	Beijing Sports University	Haigeng Football Base, Kunming
13:30

27 February 2019	Shanghai	0–0	Sichuan	Haigeng Football Base, Kunming
13:30

2 March 2019	Sichuan	2–4	Changchun Rural Commercial Bank	Haigeng Football Base, Kunming
10:00

2 March 2019	Beijing Sports University	w/o	Shanghai	Haigeng Football Base, Kunming
10:00

5 March 2019	Changchun Rural Commercial Bank	2–2	Shanghai	Haigeng Football Base, Kunming
16:00

5 March 2019	Sichuan	w/o	Beijing Sports University	Haigeng Football Base, Kunming
16:00

=== Group D ===
Pos	Team	Pld	W	D	L	GF	GA	GD	Pts
1	PLA	3	1	2	0	4	2	+2	5
2	Henan Huishang	3	1	2	0	4	2	+2	5
3	Hebei China Fortune	3	1	2	0	3	1	+2	5
4	Zhejiang	3	0	0	3	1	7	−6	0

Rules for classification: 1) Points; 2) Goal difference; 3) Goals scored

27 February 2019	Zhejiang	0–2	PLA	Haigeng Football Base, Kunming
16:00

27 February 2019	Henan Huishang	0–0	Hebei China Fortune	Haigeng Football Base, Kunming
16:00

2 March 2019	Hebei China Fortune	2–0	Zhejiang	Haigeng Football Base, Kunming
10:00

2 March 2019	PLA	1–1	Henan Huishang	Haigeng Football Base, Kunming
10:00

5 March 2019	Zhejiang	1–3	Henan Huishang	Haigeng Football Base, Kunming
13:30

5 March 2019	Hebei China Fortune	1–1	PLA	Haigeng Football Base, Kunming
13:30

=== Group E ===
Pos	Team	Pld	W	D	L	GF	GA	GD	Pts
1	Jiangsu Suning	3	3	0	0	32	1	+31	9
2	Guangdong Meizhou Huijun	3	2	0	1	11	3	+8	6
3	Hebei Olé Elite	3	1	0	2	3	15	−12	3
4	Qinhuangdao BSU (Note: Qinhuangdao BSU withdrew from the competition after their first match.)	3	0	0	3	0	27	−27	0

Rules for classification: 1) Points; 2) Goal difference; 3) Goals scored
Notes:

27 February 2019	Jiangsu Suning	21–0	Qinhuangdao BSU	Haigeng Football Base, Kunming
16:00

27 February 2019	Guangdong Meizhou Huijun	7–0	Hebei Olé Elite	Haigeng Football Base, Kunming
16:00

2 March 2019	Hebei Olé Elite	0–8	Jiangsu Suning	Haigeng Football Base, Kunming
13:30

2 March 2019	Qinhuangdao BSU	w/o	Guangdong Meizhou Huijun	Haigeng Football Base, Kunming
13:30

5 March 2019	Jiangsu Suning	3–1	Guangdong Meizhou Huijun	Haigeng Football Base, Kunming
16:00

5 March 2019	Hebei Olé Elite	w/o	Qinhuangdao BSU	Haigeng Football Base, Kunming
16:00

== Final round ==
=== 1st–12th-place play-offs ===
==== Group A ====
Pos	Team	Pld	W	D	L	GF	GA	GD	Pts
1	Shanghai	3	1	2	0	6	2	+4	5
2	Beijing BG Phoenix	3	1	2	0	3	2	+1	5
3	Changchun Rural Commercial Bank	3	1	2	0	1	0	+1	5
4	Henan Huishang	3	0	0	3	2	8	−6	0

Rules for classification: 1) Points; 2) Goal difference; 3) Goals scored

12 April 2019	Changchun Rural Commercial Bank	0–0	Shanghai
10:00

12 April 2019	Beijing BG Phoenix	2–1	Henan Huishang
15:30

15 April 2019	Shanghai	1–1	Beijing BG Phoenix
10:00

15 April 2019	Henan Huishang	0–1	Changchun Rural Commercial Bank
15:30

18 April 2019	Changchun Rural Commercial Bank	0–0	Beijing BG Phoenix
16:00

18 April 2019	Henan Huishang	1–5	Shanghai
16:00

==== Group B ====
Pos	Team	Pld	W	D	L	GF	GA	GD	Pts
1	Guangdong Meizhou Huijun	3	2	1	0	4	1	+3	7
2	Shandong Sports Lottery	3	2	0	1	8	3	+5	6
3	Jiangsu Suning	3	1	1	1	7	3	+4	4
4	Hebei China Fortune	3	0	0	3	0	12	−12	0

Rules for classification: 1) Points; 2) Goal difference; 3) Goals scored

12 April 2019	Jiangsu Suning	5–0	Hebei China Fortune
10:00

12 April 2019	Shandong Sports Lottery	0–2	Guangdong Meizhou Huijun
15:30

15 April 2019	Hebei China Fortune	0–6	Shandong Sports Lottery
10:00

15 April 2019	Guangdong Meizhou Huijun	1–1	Jiangsu Suning
15:30

18 April 2019	Jiangsu Suning	1–2	Shandong Sports Lottery
10:00

18 April 2019	Guangdong Meizhou Huijun	1–0	Hebei China Fortune
10:00

==== Group C ====
Pos	Team	Pld	W	D	L	GF	GA	GD	Pts
1	Wuhan Jianghan University	3	2	1	0	7	0	+7	7
2	Dalian Quanjian	3	2	0	1	4	4	0	6
3	PLA	3	1	1	1	1	1	0	4
4	Sichuan	3	0	0	3	2	9	−7	0

Rules for classification: 1) Points; 2) Goal difference; 3) Goals scored

12 April 2019	Dalian Quanjian	3–2	Sichuan
10:00

12 April 2019	PLA	0–0	Wuhan Jianghan University
15:30

15 April 2019	Sichuan	0–1	PLA
10:00

15 April 2019	Wuhan Jianghan University	2–0	Dalian Quanjian
15:30

18 April 2019	Dalian Quanjian	1–0	PLA
13:30

18 April 2019	Wuhan Jianghan University	5–0	Sichuan
13:30

==== Quarter-finals ====
7 May 2019	Shandong Sports Lottery	0–1	Beijing BG Phoenix
10:00

7 May 2019	Shanghai	1–1 (2–4 p)	Dalian Quanjian
10:00

7 May 2019	Wuhan Jianghan University	0–3	Jiangsu Suning
15:30

7 May 2019	Guangdong Meizhou Huijun	0–5	Changchun Rural Commercial Bank
15:30

==== 5th–8th-place play-offs ====
10 May 2019	Wuhan Jianghan University	1–2	Shanghai
10:00

10 May 2019	Guangdong Meizhou Huijun	0–0 (5–4 p)	Shandong Sports Lottery
10:00

==== Semi-finals ====
10 May 2019	Beijing BG Phoenix	0–1	Dalian Quanjian
15:30

10 May 2019	Jiangsu Suning	7–1	Changchun Rural Commercial Bank
15:30

==== 7th–8th-place play-off ====
13 May 2019	Shandong Sports Lottery	–	Wuhan Jianghan University
10:00

==== 5th–6th-place play-off ====
13 May 2019	Guangdong Meizhou Huijun	–	Shanghai
15:30

==== 3rd–4th-place play-off ====
13 May 2019	Changchun Rural Commercial Bank	–	Beijing BG Phoenix
10:00

==== Final ====
13 May 2019	Jiangsu Suning	–	Dalian Quanjian
15:30

=== 13th–16th-place play-offs ===
==== Group D ====
Pos	Team	Pld	W	D	L	GF	GA	GD	Pts
1	Shaanxi	2	1	1	0	3	1	+2	4
2	Chongqing	2	1	0	1	7	4	+3	3
3	Donghua University	2	0	1	1	1	6	−5	1

Rules for classification: 1) Points; 2) Goal difference; 3) Goals scored

12 April 2019	Shaanxi	3–1	Chongqing
15:30

14 April 2019	Donghua University	1–6	Chongqing
15:30

16 April 2019	Shaanxi	0–0	Donghua University
15:30

==== Group E ====
Pos	Team	Pld	W	D	L	GF	GA	GD	Pts
1	Zhejiang	2	2	0	0	4	0	+4	6
2	Hebei Olé Elite	2	1	0	1	5	1	+4	3
3	Yunnan Jiashijing	2	0	0	2	0	8	−8	0

Rules for classification: 1) Points; 2) Goal difference; 3) Goals scored

12 April 2019	Hebei Olé Elite	5–0	Yunnan Jiashijing
15:30

14 April 2019	Zhejiang	3–0	Yunnan Jiashijing
15:30

16 April 2019	Hebei Olé Elite	0–1	Zhejiang
15:30

==== 13th–14th-place play-off ====
18 April 2019	Shaanxi	1–1 (3–5 p)	Zhejiang
15:30

==== 15th–16th-place play-off ====
18 April 2019	Chongqing	2–0	Hebei Olé Elite
15:30

==== 17th–18th-place play-off ====
18 April 2019	Donghua University	2–1	Yunnan Jiashijing
10:00
