= Women's football in Jamaica =

- Country: Jamaica
- Governing body: Jamaica Football Federation
- National team(s): Women's national team

Club competitions
- JFF/SDF Women's League

International competitions
- Olympics; FIFA Women's World Cup (National Team); CONCACAF Women's Championship (National Team)

Women's football in Jamaica was first reported in 1935. The sport later grew in popularity, forming leagues and eventually the Caribbean's first team to qualify for a FIFA Women's World Cup.

== History ==
Football in Jamaica has been a pastime since the 1890s. Since then, football has flourished due to the suitable climate as well as the numerous teams that play. The first official women's football match in Jamaica was on 29 November 1935 in Kingston, held to raise money for the Jubilee Memorial Fund. Further charitable matches followed, with regular coverage in local newspapers by 1936 and the first tournament between women's teams reported on 18 November 1936.

In 1975, Jamaican forward Beverly Ranger became the first professional women's footballer in Germany, being sponsored by Puma.

In 1987, the women's national football team was founded, with Andrea Lewis as its first president.

In February 1990, a regional league in the Kingston and St. James region crowned a club named the Boogie Girls as its first champions. The league was disbanded in 1998 in favor of a national league founded in 1999, first won by the Portmore Strikers.

In 2011, $33 million was spent on the women's youth development.

== Cultural ==
Culturally, women’s football and football in general is a very popular sport along with cricket in Jamaica. Numerous clubs, teams, and national teams have been created both for women and men to play. On the streets, there will often be people playing football in makeshift arenas or on the pavement. However, many women face prejudice and stigma for playing the game.

== National team ==
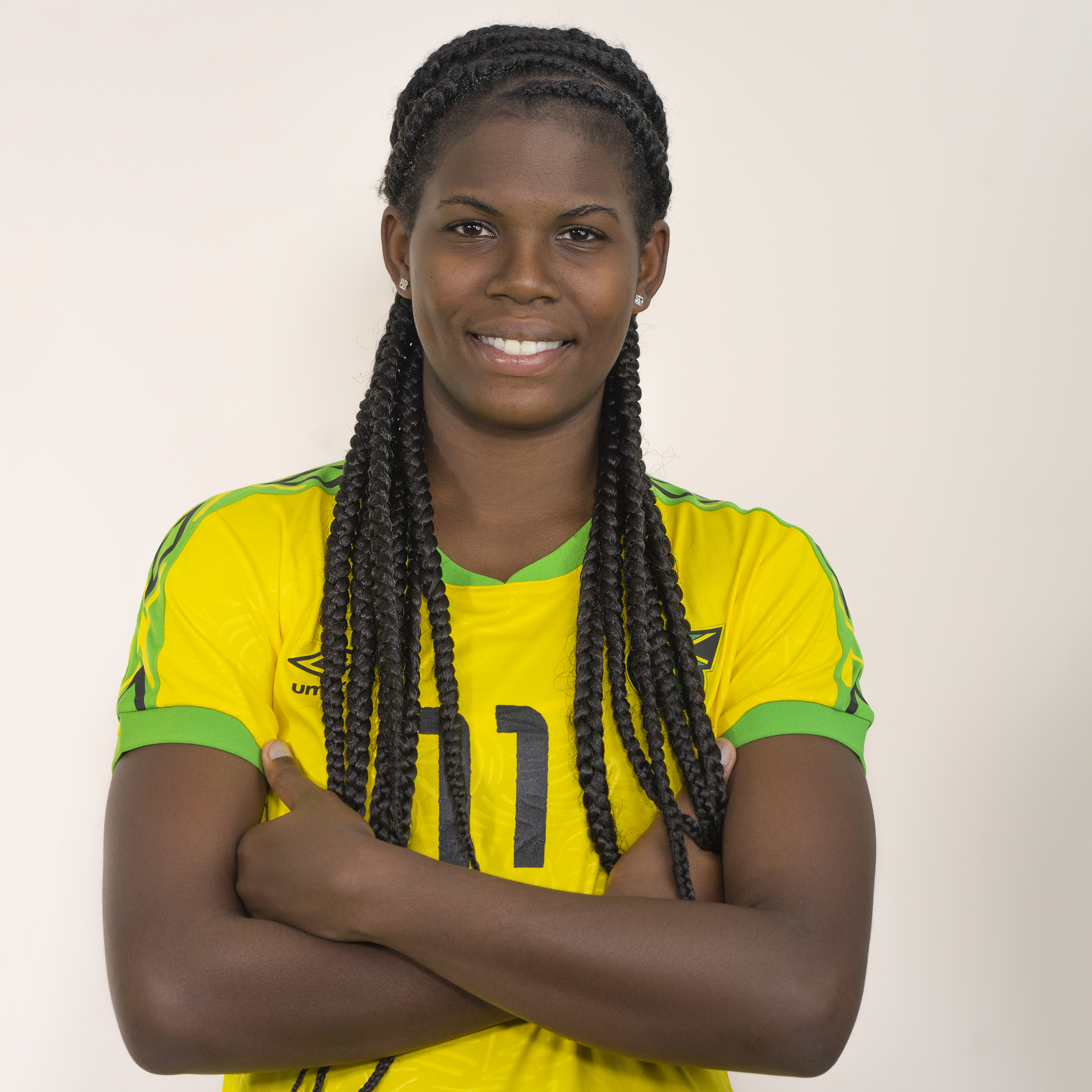
Jamaican forward Khadija Shaw has been among the leading goal scorers in international competition as well as French and English top-flight leagues.

The Jamaican national team played their first international match in 1991.

In 2008 the national team was disbanded, and revived in 2014 due to the fundraising efforts and advocacy of Cedella Marley. The federation disbanded the team in 2015 after it failed to qualify for the 2015 FIFA Women's World Cup, then revived it briefly before suspending it again for a lack of budget in 2016. During this period the team raised its own funds for training camps and travel, used borrowed uniforms, and were coached by volunteer Hue Menzies.

The national team qualified for 2019 FIFA Women's World Cup, its first such qualification and the first for any Caribbean nation, by defeating Panama in a third-place playoff. While Jamaica did not win a match at the tournament, Havana Solaun scored the nation's first goal at a Women's World Cup against Australia. Following Jamaica's success, Menzies was named the 2018 women's football coach of the year by CONCACAF. However, the players and Menzies raised several labor disputes over unpaid wages, eventually resulting in a player strike and Menzies' resignation.

After several coaching changes, including the brief term of Hubert Busby Jr. and a player revolt, Lorne Donaldson was named head coach in 2022. In July 2022, Jamaica qualified for their second World Cup, a historic feat considering Jamaica's men's counterpart have been unable to do the same. Jamaica won their first match at a World Cup in 2023 with Allyson Swaby scoring against Panama. With this victory and two scoreless draws against France and Brazil, Jamaica advanced to the second round.

== Notable players ==
Forward Khadija Shaw was the world's top scorer during the 2019 World Cup qualifiers and quickly became Jamaica's all-time leading goalscorer. Shaw signed a professional contract with Bordeaux on the day the 2019 World Cup started. With Bordeaux, Shaw would go on to win the 2020–21 Division 1 Féminine golden boot with 22 goals; she then signed with Manchester City in 2021. Several other Jamaican national team players have signed professional contracts abroad, including Allyson Swaby, Chantelle Swaby, Deneisha Blackwood, and Tiernny Wiltshire.

== See also ==
- Football in Jamaica
