= South Sudan Women's National League =

South Sudan W-National League
- Founded: 2021
- Country: South Sudan
- Confederation: CAF
- Number of clubs: 8
- International cup: CAF W-Champions League
- Current champions: Yei Join Stars FC (2nd title) (2022)
- Most championships: Yei Join Stars FC (2 title)
- Current: 2025-26 South Sudan W-National League

The South Sudan Women's National League is the top flight of women's association football in South Sudan. The competition is run by the South Sudan Football Association.

== History ==
The South Sudan Women's National League was created on 2021. The first winners of the league was Yei Join Stars FC.

== Champions ==
The list of champions and runners-up:

Year	Champions	Runners-up
2021	Yei Join Stars FC	Torit Women FC
2022	Yei Join Stars FC	Munuki
2023		

== Most successful clubs ==
Rank	Club	Champions	Runners-up	Winning seasons	Runners-up seasons
1	Yei Join Stars FC	1	0	2021	
2	Torit Women FC	0	1		2021

== Top goalscorers ==
Season	Player	Team	Goals
2020-21	(South Sudan) Amy Lasu	Yei Joint Stars	11
2021-22	(South Sudan) Deborah Luka	Yei Joint Stars	14
