= Comorian Women's Championship =

- Founded: 2006
- Country: Comoros
- Confederation: CAF
- Number of clubs: 10
- Relegation to: W-Championship D2
- Domestic cup: Comorian Women's Cup
- International cup: CAF W-Champions League
- Current champions: Olympic de Moroni (1st title) (2021-22)
- Current: 2025-26 W-Championship

The Comorian Women's Championship (Arabic: بطولة جزر القمر للسيدات) is the top flight of women's association football in Comoros. The competition is run by the Comoros Football Federation.

== History ==
Women's football was born in Comoros on 2003 with the organisation of the women's tournament that was won by FC Mitsamiouli. On 2006, started the first edition of the Comorian Women's Championship run by the Comorian federation.

== Champions ==
The list of champions and runners-up:

Year	Champions	Runners-up
2006–07		
2007–08	FC Mitsamiouli	
2008–09		
2009–10	FC Mitsamiouli	
2010–11		
2011–12		
2012–13	suspended because financial reasons	
2013–14	cancelled	
2014–15	FC Mirontsy	FC Mitsamiouli
2015–16		
2016–17	Club Maman de Moroni	FC Domoni
2017–18	FC Ouvanga Espoir de Moya	
2018–19	FC Ouvanga Espoir de Moya	Club Maman de Moroni
2019–20	abandoned because of the COVID-19 pandemic in Comoros	
2020–21	cancelled	
2021–22	Olympic de Moroni	Ouvanga Espoir
2022–23	Olympic de Moroni	Ouvanga Espoir

== See also ==
- Comorian Women's Cup
