= Women's football in Thailand =

Overview of Thailand in football

Women's Football in Thailand
- Governing body: FA Thailand
- National team: Women's national team

National competitions
- FIFA Women's World Cup (National Team) Summer Olympics (National Team) AFC Women's Asian Cup (National Team) Asian Games (National Team) EAFF Women's Championship (National Team)

Club competitions
- League: Thai Women's League

Women's football in Thailand is growing in popularity.

== Club football ==
Thai Women's League is the highest tier of women's football in Thailand which was founded in 2009.

== National team ==
Thailand greatest achievement was winning the 1983 AFC Women's Championship, Since the 21st Century Thailand has seen an upsurge of success with the national team qualifying for the World Cup twice.

== See also ==
- Football in Thailand
