= Women's football in North Korea =

- Governing body: DPR Korea Football Association
- National team: Women's national team

National competitions
- FIFA Women's World Cup; Summer Olympics

Club competitions
- League: DPR Korea Women's Premier League

North Korea is considered a powerhouse in women's football. The Democratic People's Republic of Korea (DPRK) began investing in the movement in the late 1980s in order to gain visibility worldwide in the face of political isolation.

The North Korea women's national football team have won three Asian Cups and three Asian Games. The under-20 team has won three U-20 World Cups and two U-20 Asian Cups, and the under-17s have won four U-17 World Cups and five U-17 Asian Cups.

== History ==
Upon emergence of rumors regarding the creation of a Women's World Cup in 1986, the North Korean government began funding women's football in the country; they built infrastructure, fostered talent scouting, and established teams in the military. The country's leader Kim Jong Il saw the sport as part of the state's agenda.

The North Korea women's national football team debuted in 1989 and participated in the first Women's World Cup in China in 1991. They won three Asian Cups in the 2000s, making them one of Asia's major powerhouses. Many home matches held at the 150,000-seat Rungrado 1st of May Stadium were attended by thousands of spectators. In 2006, North Korea won their first FIFA U-20 Women's World Cup after defeating China 5–0 in the final.

In the 2011 FIFA Women's World Cup, five North Korean players failed doping tests; the team was fined and banned from 2014 Asian Cup and the 2015 World Cup as a result. The North Korean delegation claimed several members had been struck by a lightning, the treatment of which required a traditional Chinese medicine of deer musk gland. The team later withdrew from the 2019 East Asian Championships for unknown reasons and the 2023 World Cup due to the COVID-19 pandemic.

The DPR Korea Women's Premier League was established in 2012. In 2013, country leader Kim Jong Un ordered the foundation of the Pyongyang International Football School, an elite youth football academy for both boys and girls.

== Clubs ==
The DPR Korea Women's Premier League is the highest tier of women's football in North Korea. Due to the United Nations sanctions on North Korea, footballers are barred from expatriating.

On May 20, 2026, Naegohyang FC defeated 2–1 South Koreans Suwon FC in the eponymous city in the semi-finals of the AFC Women's Champions League. South Koreans fans, invited by numerous NGOs, attended the match. The DPRK club went on to win competition after defeating Tokyo Verdy Beleza 1–0 in the final.

== In popular culture ==
North Korean state television aired a drama series on women's football.

== Reception ==
According to Dr Jung Woo Lee, lecturer at Edinburgh University, the North Korean government sees youth women's football as a vehicle for propaganda and visibility overseas. Incentives for victories include housing outside Pyongyang and the opportunity for supervised travel. Football is therefore seen as a way to improve living conditions for the players and their families.

Success in women's football is often celebrated by Kim Jong Un, who has repeatedly called the players "daughters of the nation". Hong Kong FIFA trainer Kwok Ka Ming, who worked in North Korea between 2013 and 2019, noted that players are often instructed to win. This contrasts with Europe, where long-term growth is prioritized at grassroots level.

United Nations sanctions prevent foreign clubs from signing North Korean players. This is believed to be one of the reasons North Korean national teams fail to replicate the success they achieve at the youth level.
