= Sudanese Women League =

- The logo of the league
- Founded: 2019
- Country: Sudan
- Confederation: CAF
- Number of clubs: 15
- Relegation to: Regional Championships
- International cup: CAF W-Champions League
- Current champions: Al Tahady (1st title) (2021-22)
- Most championships: Al Difaa (2 titles)
- Current: 2025–26 Sudanese Women League

The Sudanese Women Football League (Arabic: دوري كرة القدم السوداني للسيدات) is the top flight of women's association football in Sudan. It is the women's equivalent of the Sudan Premier League, but is not professional. The competition is run by the Sudan Football Association.

== History ==
On 1 October 2019, Sudan witnessed the opening of the first women's football tournament in Sudan, organized by the Sudanese Football Association and sponsored by the Minister of Youth and Sports, Engineer Walaa Al-Boushi. The opening match was between Al Tahady and Al Difaa teams. The opening was attended by hundreds of fans and an estimated number of diplomats and media personnel. The first league was won by Al-Difaa.

== Champions ==
The list of champions and runners-up:

Year	Champions	Runners-up
2019–20	Al Difaa SC	Al Tahady WFT
2020–21	Al Difaa SC	Al Tahady WFT
2021–22	Al Tahady WFT	Al Karnak SC
2022–23	canceled	
2023–24		

== Most successful clubs ==
Rank	Club	Champions	Runners-up	Winning seasons	Runners-up seasons
1	Al Difaa SC	2	0	2020, 2021	
2	Al Tahady WFT	1	2	2022	2020, 2021
3	Al Karnak SC	0	1		2022

== See also ==
- Women's football in Sudan
