= Libyan Women's League =

- Founded: 2021
- Country: Libya
- Confederation: CAF
- International cup: CAF W-Champions League
- Current: 2025–26 Libyan W-League

The Libyan Women's League (Arabic: الدوري الليبي للسيدات) is the top flight of women's association football in Libya. The competition is run by the Women's Football Committee of the Libyan Football Federation. The first championship is planned to be start for the 2021–22 season.

== History ==
The first Libyan Women's League will start in 2021, it is organized by the Women's Football Committee. To create this national event, in May 2021, Souad Al-Shaibani, a member of directors of the Libyan Football Federation, called on all clubs to form women's teams and open the door for affiliation for girls; in order to establish the first Libyan women's league and prepare a national team capable of competing in the upcoming competitions. Several training, arbitration and administrative courses, with the aim of refining and preparing female cadres to develop and develop Libyan women's football had done. In August 2021, the clubs started successively in registering, as three teams have already been licensed: Al-Akhdar SC, Al-Wehda SC and Shabebat Al-Marsa.
