= Mauritanian Women's Championship =

- The logo of the championship
- Founded: 2016; 10 years ago
- Country: Mauritania
- Confederation: CAF
- Number of clubs: 10
- Relegation to: Regional Championships
- International cup: CAF W-Champions League
- Current champions: FC Camara (1st title) (2018-19)
- Most championships: FC El Mina (2 titles)
- Current: 2026 W-Championship

The Mauritanian Women's Championship (Arabic: دوري كرة القدم الموريتاني للسيدات) is the top flight of women's association football in Mauritania. It is the women's equivalent of the Super D1 for men, but is not professional. The competition is run by the Football Federation of Mauritania.

== History ==
Women's football was born in Mauritania on 2007 with the organisation of the unofficial tournament that was won by team École feu Mini. On 2014, another tournament was held under the name of Tournoi pour la promotion du football féminin.

For the 2016–17 season, first edition of the Mauritanian Women's Championship started, an official women's competition run by the Mauritanian federation.

== Champions ==
The list of champions and runners-up:

Year	Champions	Runners-up
2016–17	FC El Mina	FC Camara
2017–18	FC El Mina	FC Douga
2019	FC Camara	FC Saada
2020	abandoned because of COVID-19 pandemic in Mauritania	
2021	Not held	
2022	Not held	
2023	Not held	
2024	Not held	
2025		

== Most successful clubs ==
Rank	Club	Champions	Runners-up	Winning seasons	Runners-up seasons
1	FC El Mina	2	0	2017, 2018	
2	FC Camara	1	1	2019	2017
3	FC Douga	0	1		2018
3	FC Saada	0	1		2019
