= Djiboutian Women's Championship =

- Founded: 1999
- Country: Djibouti
- Confederation: CAF
- Number of clubs: 10
- Relegation to: W-Championship D2
- Domestic cup: Djiboutian W-Cup
- International cup: CAF W-Champions League
- Current champions: FAD Club (7th title) (2021-22)
- Most championships: FAD Club (7 titles)
- Current: 2022–23 Djiboutian W-Championship

The Djiboutian Women's Championship (Arabic: بطولة دجيبوتي للسيدات) is the top flight of women's association football in Djibouti. The competition is run by the Djiboutian Football Federation.

== History ==
The first Djiboutian women's championship was contested in 1999-00 season, it was won by Bis Mer Rouge Club.

== Champions ==
The list of champions and runners-up:

Year	Champions	Runners-up
1999–00	BIMR Club	
2000–01	BIMR Club	
2001–02	BIMR Club	
2002–03	BIMR Club	
2003–04		
2004–05	BIMR Club	Fukuzawa Club
2005–06		
2006–07	AS Port	
2007–08		
2008–09	AS Port	Fukuzawa Club
2009–10	not held	
2010–11	not held	
2012	not held	
2013	Cité Hodan	FC Barwaqo
2014	CDC du Quartier	Magasin de Bonheur
2015	FAD Club	
2016	FAD Club	Cheick Moussa FF
2016–17	FAD Club	Cheick Moussa FF
2017–18	FAD Club	
2018–19	FAD Club	UJ Q4
2019–20	FAD Club	Garde Républicaine FF
2020–21	Garde Républicaine FF	FAD Club
2021–22	FAD Club	Garde Républicaine FF
2023–24		

== Most successful clubs ==
Rank	Club	Champions	Runners-up	Winning Seasons	Runners-up Seasons
1	FAD Club	7	1	2015, 2016, 2017, 2018, 2019, 2020, 2022	2021
2	BIMR Club	5	0	2000, 2001, 2002, 2003, 2005	
3	AS Port	2	0	2007, 2009	
4	Garde Républicaine FF	1	2	2021	2020, 2022
5	Cité Hodan	1	0	2013	
5	CDC du Quartier	1	0	2014	
7	Fukuzawa Club	0	2		2005, 2009
7	Cheick Moussa FF	0	2		2016, 2017
9	FC Barwaqo	0	1		2013
9	Magasin de Bonheur	0	1		2014
9	UJ Q4	0	1		2019

Rq:

- FAD Club: Forces Armées Djiboutiennes Club
- BIMR Club: Banque Indosuez Mer Rouge Club
- CDC du Quartier: Centre de Développement Communautaire du Quartier
