= 2022–23 Mongolian National Premier League =

Mongolian Premier League season

Mongolian National Premier League
- Season: 2022–23
- Dates: 23 August 2022 – 2 July 2023
- Champions: FC Ulaanbaatar
- Relegated: BCH Lions
- Goals: 573 (without UB City)
- Top goalscorer: (Mongolia) Batkhyag Munkh-Erdene (38 goals)

The 2022–23 Mongolian National Premier League is the 55th season of the Mongolian National Premier League, the highest division of football league in the country. Erchim FC were the defending champions. The league was known this season as the Mobi Premier League for sponsorship reasons. FC Ulaanbaatar were the eventual champions, winning their second title in club history. Ulaanbaatar City FC withdrew from the league without playing their final three matches. The club's match results were annulled. Khovd FC's Batkhyag Munkh-Erdene was the league's top scorer with 38 goals.

== Changes before the season ==
BCH Lions should have been relegated from 2021–22 Mongolian National Premier League but remained in the league after Athletic 220 withdrew.

== Teams ==
All matches were played at the MFF Football Centre in Ulaanbaatar, which has 5,000 capacity.

Club	City	Manager	Kit Manufacturer
BCH Lions	Ulaanbaatar	(Mongolia) B. Chin-Orgil	TG Sport
Deren	Deren	(Mongolia) Ch. Munkhbat	Joma
SP Falcons	Ulaanbaatar	(Mongolia) I.Otgonbayar	TG Sport
Khaan Khuns Erchim	Ulaanbaatar	(Mongolia) D.Batnasam	TG Sport
Khangarid FC	Erdenet	(Mongolia) A.Erdenebayar	TG Sport
Khoromkhon FC	Ulaanbaatar	(Mongolia) S.Purevsukh	TG Sport
Khovd FC	Khovd	(Mongolia) B.Garidmagnai	TG Sport
Tuv Azarganuud	Töv Province	vacant	Nike
Ulaanbaatar FC	Ulaanbaatar	(Serbia) Vojislav Bralušić	TG Sport
Ulaanbaatar City	Ulaanbaatar	(Mongolia) Ts.Ganbold	TG Sport

== Foreign players ==
The number of foreign players is restricted to 5 per team. There are no more additional restrictions.

Club	Player 1	Player 2	Player 3	Player 4	Player 5	Former Players
BCH Lions	(Japan) Tomoaki Harada	(Japan) Imai Kanato	(Japan) Sasaki Mizuho	(Japan) Ikko Fujirawa	(Japan) Yusuki Miyajima	(Japan) Tomoya Watanabe
Deren	(Russia) Nikita Artemenko	(Russia) Savva Knyazev	(South Korea) Jung Tae-baek			
SP Falcons	(Brazil) Vitor Guilherme	(Brazil) Tiago Tomais	(Brazil) Andre Paulinho	(South Korea) Kan Chin-gyoun	(Italy) Rosario Mattia Russo	
Khaan Khuns Erchim	(Japan) Riku Ichimura	(Japan) Daiki Yahana	(Japan) Yusuke Nitta	(South Korea) Kim Min-seo		
Khangarid FC						
Khoromkhon FC	(Japan) Hiromasa Ishikawa	(Japan) Shota Atsumi	(Japan) Masatoshi Takeshita	(Japan) Takuma Negayoshi	(Japan) Shina Mizuki	
Khovd FC	(Japan) Ayumu Yamane	(Japan) Isami Aoi	(Japan) Ken Murayama	(Japan) Sho Otsuka	(Japan) Masaka Soma	
Tuv Azarganuud	(Japan) Takaya Sugasawa	(Japan) Yuma Nishimura	(Japan) Ryusei Furukawa			
Ulaanbaatar FC	(Japan) Akihiro Suzuki	(Ghana) Abdul Rashid Obuobi	(Nigeria) Emeka Jacobs Emerun	(Serbia) Nemanja Krusevać		
Ulaanbaatar City	(Japan) Neo Tamura	(Iran) Randi Reza				

== Managerial changes ==
Team	Outgoing manager	Manner of departure	Date of vacancy	After round	Table	Incoming manager
Deren	(Slovakia) Marek Fabuľa	Signed by (Slovakia) Tatran	December 2022	9	2	(Mongolia) Chimeddorj Munkhbat
Tuv Azarganuud	(Mongolia) Chimeddorj Munkhbat	Signed by Deren	December 2022	9	7	

== League table ==
Pos	Team	Pld	W	D	L	GF	GA	GD	Pts	Qualification
1	Ulaanbaatar (Note: Ulaanbaatar FC started the season with 3 points deducted as sentence from Mongolian Football Federation for breaking licensing criteria.)	24	21	2	1	108	15	+93	62	Qualifications for AFC Cup
2	Deren	24	15	3	6	76	29	+47	48	
3	Falcons	24	14	4	6	68	29	+39	46	
4	Khovd (Note: Khovd FC started the season with 6 points deducted as sentence from Mongolian Football Federation for breaking a licensing criteria.)	24	15	3	6	86	37	+49	42	
5	Tuv Azarganuud (Note: Tuv Azarganuud started the season with 6 points deducted as sentence from Mongolian Football Federation for breaking a licensing criteria.)	24	12	0	12	73	66	+7	30	
6	Khangarid	24	7	2	15	43	96	−53	23	
7	Erchim (Note: Erchim started the season with 3 points deducted as sentence from Mongolian Football Federation for breaking a licensing criteria.)	24	8	1	15	55	61	−6	22	
8	Khoromkhon	24	5	2	17	33	84	−51	17	
9	Ulaanbaatar City (Note: Ulaanbaatar City FC started the season with 6 points deducted as sentence from Mongolian Football Federation for breaking a licensing criteria. Ulaanbaatar City FC withdrew from the league with three matches remaining and its results were annulled by the MFF)	23	10	2	11	63	53	+10	0	Withdrew from the league, results annulled
10	BCH Lions	24	2	1	21	31	156	−125	7	Qualification to relegation play-offs

Updated to match(es) played on 25 August 2023. Source: RSSSF
Rules for classification: 1) Points; 2) Head-to-head points; 3) Head-to-head goal difference; 4) Head-to-head goal scored; 5) Goal difference; 6) Goal scored.

== Top goalscorers ==
Rank	Player	Club	Goals
1	(Mongolia) Batkhyag Munkh-Erdene	Khovd	38
2	(Mongolia) Tsedenbalyn Tümenjargal	Tuv Azarganuud	32
3	(Japan) Akihiro Suzuki	Ulaanbaatar	28
4	(Mongolia) M. Batkishig	SP Falcons	22
5	(Mongolia) Dölgöön Amaraa	Deren	18
6	(Mongolia) E. Temuulen	Khangarid	14
6	(Mongolia) Nyam-Osor Naranbold	Khovd	14
8	(Mongolia) Purevsuren Uuganbayar	FC Ulaanbaatar	13
9	(Mongolia) Narmandakh Artag	Falcons	12

Most goals by a player in a single game

- Chinbat Bat-Erdene, 7 goals (Khovd 22–0 Lions, 29 June 2023)

== Multiple hat-tricks ==
It's season they made 35 multiple hat-tricks.

Player	For	Against	Score	Date
(Mongolia) Monkh-Erdene Batkhuyag^{4}	Ulaanbaatar City	Khangarid	8–1	24 August 2022
(Japan) Akihiro Suzuki^{4}	Ulaanbaatar	Lions	0–12	28 August 2022
(Mongolia) Unur-Erdene Erdenechimeg	Ulaanbaatar	Lions	0–12	28 August 2022
(Mongolia) Tsedenbalyn Tümenjargal	Tuv Azarganuud	Khangarid	1–5	4 September 2022
(Libya) Hassat Gaddafi	Khoromkhon	Lions	1–4	1 October 2022
(South Korea) Kim Ming-seo	Erchim	Khangarid	7–2	2 October 2022
(Japan) Yuzuki Miyajima	Lions	Khangarid	1–9	8 October 2022
(Mongolia) Narmandakh Artag	Falcons	Khangarid	1–7	15 October 2022
(Mongolia) Tsedenbalyn Tümenjargal^{5}	Tuv Azarganuud	Lions	2–10	16 October 2022
(Mongolia) Uuganbat Bat-Erdene	Deren	Khangarid	10–0	22 October 2022
(Japan) Ken Murayama	Khovd	Lions	6–1	23 October 2022
(Mongolia) Tsedenbalyn Tümenjargal	Tuv Azarganuud	Ulaanbaatar City	8–2	23 October 2022
(Mongolia) Baljinnyam Batbold	Ulaanbaatar	Khoromkhon	4–0	23 October 2022
(Mongolia) Purevsuren Uuganbayar^{5}	Ulaanbaatar	Khangarid	0–10	4 November 2022
(Mongolia) Baljinnyam Batbold	Ulaanbaatar	Khangarid	0–10	4 November 2022
(Japan) Akihiro Suzuki	Ulaanbaatar	Lions	9–1	15 March 2023
(Mongolia) Oyunbaatar Mijiddorj^{4}	Ulaanbaatar	Lions	9–1	15 March 2023
(Mongolia) Batbayar Tuguldur	Khoromkhon	Lions	4–1	8 April 2023
(Mongolia) Tsedenbalyn Tümenjargal	Tuv Azarganuud	Khovd	4–5	12 April 2023
(Mongolia) Monkh-Erdene Batkhuyag	Khovd	Tuv Azarganuud	4–5	12 April 2023
(Pakistan) Kareem Khan	Khangarid	Lions	0–5	15 April 2023
(Mongolia) Tsedenbalyn Tümenjargal^{4}	Tuv Azarganuud	Lions	6–1	26 April 2023
(Mongolia) Mönkh-Erdene Tsagaantsooj^{4}	Khovd	Lions	0–8	29 April 2023
(Japan) Akihiro Suzuki	Ulaanbaatar	Khoromkhon	1–6	30 April 2023
(Mongolia) Monkh-Erdene Barkhuyag	Khovd	Tuv Azarganuud	2–5	3 May 2023
(India) Takuto Miki	Ulaanbaatar	Khangarid	6–0	4 May 2023
(Mongolia) A. Sodmenkh	Ulaanbaatar City	Khoromkhon	5–1	4 May 2023
(Cayman Islands) Joor Hymerza	Tuv Azarganuud	Khoromkhon	0–4	6 May 2023
(Mongolia) Myagmar Bathishig	Falcons	Tuv Azarganuud	1–5	14 May 2023
(Mongolia) Galt Tuguldur	Erchim	Khoromkhon	2–3	17 May 2023
(Mongolia) O. Temuge	Erchim	Lions	0–11	3 June 2023
(Mongolia) Tsedenbalyn Tümenjargal	Tuv Azarganuud	Lions	2–8	25 June 2023
(Mongolia) Chinbat Bat-Erdene^{7}	Khovd	Lions	22–0	29 June 2023
(Mongolia) Enkhbileg Purevdorj	Khovd	Lions	22–0	29 June 2023
(Tajikistan) Sakiri Pamir	Ulaanbaatar	Khoromkhon	10–0	29 June 2023

Most hat-tricks by a player in the season

- (Mongolia) Tsedenbalyn Tümenjargal (6 hat-tricks)

== See also ==
- 2022–23 Mongolian 1st League
- 2022 MFF Mongolian Cup
- 2022 MFF Mongolian Super Cup
