= 2025–26 Mongolian Premier League =

Mongolian Premier League
- Season: 2025–26
- Dates: 20 September 2025 – 6 July 2026
- Champions: FC Ulaanbaatar (3rd title)
- Relegated: SP Falcons (withdrew) Bishrelt Khoromkhon
- AFC Challenge League: FC Ulaanbaatar; Central Stallions FC
- Top goalscorer: Min Ki-tae (24 goals)
- All statistics correct as of 6 July 2026.

The 2025–26 Mongolian Premier League is the 58th season of the Mongolian Premier League, the highest football league in the country. SP Falcons were the defending champions, but withdrew from the season.

== Changes before the season ==
Brera Ilch FC was relegated from 2024–25 Mongolian Premier League whereby Khovd Western FC who won the 2024–25 Mongolian First League was promoted. The league also changes their restrictions of foreign imports player from five to six.

== Teams ==
All matches were played at the MFF Football Centre in Ulaanbaatar, which has 5,000 capacity.

Club	City	Manager	Kit Manufacturer
Deren	Deren	(Portugal) Pedro Miranda	Joma
SP Falcons	Ulaanbaatar	(Mongolia) Ishdorjiin Otgonbayar	TG Sport
Hunters Mongolia	Ulaanbaatar	(South Korea) Mo Jeung-Il	TG Sport
Erchim	Ulaanbaatar	(Mongolia) D.Batnasam	TG Sport
Khangarid	Erdenet	(Mongolia) A.Erdenebayar	TG Sport
Bishrelt Khoromkhon	Ulaanbaatar	(Mongolia) Sanjmyataviin Purevsukh	TG Sport
Khovdyn Khuleguud	Khovd	(Mongolia) Nasan-Ulzii Battulga	TG Sport
Tuv Azarganuud	Töv Province	(Mongolia) Bayasgalangiin Garidmagnai	Nike
Ulaanbaatar	Ulaanbaatar	(Mongolia) Bekhbatyn Ganbat	TG Sport

== Foreign players ==
The number of foreign players is restricted to 6 per team. There are no more additional restrictions. With SP Falcons participating in the AFC competition are allowed to register 10 foreigners.

Club	Player 1	Player 2	Player 3	Player 4	Player 5	Player 6	AFC Competitions	Former Players
Deren	(Russia) Kirill Petrushin	(South Korea) Kim Hwi-han	(United States) Kenny McKanveer	(Spain) Toni Soler	(Afghanistan) Jeung-gyu Lie			
SP Falcons	(Brazil) Vlademir Everton	(Bermuda) Kideu	(Northern Mariana Islands) Kistgani Jeogree	(Brazil) Matheus Guará	(Serbia) Nemanja Kruševac	(Japan) Taiyo Toyoda	(Brazil) Thiago Bahiense (Japan) Shoya Nagata (Russia) Daniil Musatkin	
Hunters Mongolia	(India) Benkeyeze Szeeyeriaz	(South Korea) Choi Tae-min	(Indonesia) Kiky Rosas					
Erchim	(Japan) Hiroya Kiyomoto	(Guam) Kenzeie McLoad	(Libya) Yassef Marawi	(Japan) Kota Suemitsu				
Khangarid	(Afghanistan) Kilan Berezeo	(Japan) Yuta Mishima	(Ghana) Kwadwo Acquah	(Cayman Islands) Kaitan Kaitan	(Lebanon) Umim Salleh	(Egypt) Handy		(Afghanistan) Tamer Khan (Afghanistan) Youssef Khan (Iran) Alireza Milier (Afghanistan) Khan Ullah Yahia
Bishrelt Khoromkhon	(Afghanistan) Shogo Kagawa	(Northern Mariana Islands) Kilk-Choi Jjae	(Japan) Ryo Kato	(South Korea) Hwang Chan-won	(Nigeria) Michael Esiobi	(Uzbekistan) Mironshokh Sattorov		
Khovdyn Khuleguud	(Pakistan) Khan Fareed	(Tunisia) Youssef Béjawiéh	(Japan) Ren Yoshioka	(Japan) Shogo Tabata	(Tajikistan) Sardyov Ali			
Tuv Azarganuud	(Japan) Kohane Yamakami	(Mexico) Hugo Zambrano						
Ulaanbaatar	(Afghanistan) Khungize Rezaie Burekyai	(Japan) Kaito Kumakura	(Japan) Yuma Mukoyama	(South Korea) Park Seong-gyeol	(France) Enzo Dietrich	(Uzbekistan) Islom Shodmonov		

== Managerial changes ==
Team	Outgoing manager	Manner of departure	Date of vacancy	Position in table	Replaced by	Date of appointment
Ulaanbaatar	(Serbia) Vojislav Bralušić	Mutually agreed	April 2024	4th	(Germany) Andreas Spier	August 2024
Ulaanbaatar	(Germany) Andreas Spier	Mutually agreed	June 2025	3rd	(Mongolia) Bekhbatyn Ganbat	June 2025
Ulaanbaatar	(Mongolia) Bekhbatyn Ganbat	Mutually agreed	June 2025		TBC	TBC

== Standings ==
=== League table ===
Pos	Team	Pld	W	D	L	GF	GA	GD	Pts	Qualification or relegation
1	Ulaanbaatar (C)	23	17	3	3	82	20	+62	54	Qualification for AFC Challenge League Preliminary round
2	Central Stallions	23	14	5	4	60	26	+34	47	Qualification for AFC Challenge League Preliminary round
3	Deren	23	14	3	6	68	25	+43	45	
4	Khangarid	22	10	4	8	68	34	+34	34	
5	Hunters Mongolia	20	11	3	6	72	29	+43	36	
6	Khovd Western	20	7	3	10	36	40	−4	24	
7	Khovdyn Khuleguud	21	5	1	15	39	88	−49	16	
8	Ulaangom City	20	3	2	15	27	117	−90	11	
9	Bishrelt Khoromkhon (R)	21	2	0	19	31	116	−85	6	Qualification to relegation play-off

Updated to match(es) played on 6 July 2026. Source: Soccerway
Rules for classification: 1) Points; 2) Head-to-head points; 3) Head-to-head goal difference; 4) Head-to-head goals scored; 5) Goal difference; 6) Goals scored.
(C) Champions; (R) Relegated

== Results ==
Teams play each other three times, twice in the first half of the season (home and away) and once in the second half of the season (either home or away) with each team playing 27 matches.

=== Fixture and results ===
Home \ Away	KHW	DER	HUN	UGC	KHG	KHN	KHO	TUV	UBA
Khovd Western			0–2	2–3		3–1	3–0		
Khovd Western				0–0	1–2	3–1	5–2		
Deren					3–2			2–0	0–2
Deren			1–1			12–0	6–0	1–2	0–2
Hunters Mongolia	2–0			11–1		9–0	6–1		
Hunters Mongolia		1–1					10–1	3–1	1–4
Ulaangom City	3–2		1–11			4–2	3–3		
Ulaangom City	0–0					5–2	2–3	0–10	
Khangarid		2–3						2–2	1–3
Khangarid	2–1						6–0	1–1	1–3
Bishrelt Khoromkhon	1–3		0–9	2–4			1–7		
Bishrelt Khoromkhon	1–3	0–12		2–5					0–7
Khovdyn Khuleguud	0–3		1–6	3–3		7–1			
Khovdyn Khuleguud	2–5	0–6	1–10	3–2	0–6				
Central Stallions		0–2			2–2				0–3
Central Stallions		2–1	1–3	10–0	1–1				1–0
Ulaanbaatar		2–0			3–1			3–0	
Ulaanbaatar		2–0	4–0		3–1	7–0		0–1	

Source: Soccerway
Legend: Blue = home team win; Yellow = draw; Red = away team win.
For upcoming matches, an "a" indicates there is an article about the rivalry between the two participants.
