= 2024–25 Mongolian Premier League =

Mongolian Premier League season

Mongolian Premier League
- Season: 2024–25
- Dates: 16 August 2024 – 19 July 2025
- Champions: SP Falcons (2nd title)
- Relegated: Brera Ilch
- AFC Challenge League: SP Falcons; Khangarid
- Matches: 133
- Goals: 622 (4.68 per match)
- Top goalscorer: Yutaro Funami (31 goals)
- Biggest home win: Erchim 14–0 Tuv Azarganuud (18 August 2024)
- Biggest away win: Tuv Azarganuud 0–21 Deren (24 September 2024)
- Highest scoring: Tuv Azarganuud 0–21 Deren (24 September 2024)
- Longest winning run: 8 games SP Falcons
- Longest unbeaten run: 23 games SP Falcons
- Longest winless run: 12 games Tuv Azarganuud
- Longest losing run: 12 games Tuv Azarganuud

The 2024–25 Mongolian Premier League is the 57th season of the Mongolian Premier League, the highest football league in the country. SP Falcons were the defending champions.

== Changes before the season ==
Bavarians was relegated from 2023–24 Mongolian Premier League whereby Hunters Mongolia FC who won the 2023–24 Mongolian First League was promoted. The league also changes their restrictions of foreign imports player from five to six.

== Teams ==
All matches were played at the MFF Football Centre in Ulaanbaatar, which has 5,000 capacity.

Team	City	Manager	Kit manufacturer
Brera Ilch	Ulaanbaatar	(Italy) Andrea Mazza	TG Sport
Deren	Deren	(Portugal) Pedro Miranda	Joma
SP Falcons	Ulaanbaatar	(Mongolia) Ishdorjiin Otgonbayar	TG Sport
Hunters Mongolia	Ulaanbaatar	(Mongolia) Chimeddorj Munkhbat	TG Sport
Erchim	Ulaanbaatar	(Mongolia) D.Batnasam	TG Sport
Khangarid	Erdenet	(Mongolia) A.Erdenebayar	TG Sport
Bishrelt Khoromkhon	Ulaanbaatar	(Mongolia) Sanjmyataviin Purevsukh	TG Sport
Khovdyn Khuleguud	Khovd	(Mongolia) Nasan-Ulzii Battulga	TG Sport
Tuv Azarganuud	Töv Province	(Mongolia) Bayasgalangiin Garidmagnai	Nike
Ulaanbaatar	Ulaanbaatar	(Germany) Andreas Spier	TG Sport

== Foreign players ==
The number of foreign players is restricted to 6 per team.

Team	Player 1	Player 2	Player 3	Player 4	Player 5	Player 6	AFC competitions	Former players
Brera Ilch	(Iran) Omid Hassyun	(Libya) Ben Jalal Gaddafi	(South Korea) Cha Ju-young	(Libya) Qassem Gaddafi	(Argentina) Agustín Maciel	(Guam) Sisin Albert		
Deren	(Iraq) Hameed Saddam	(United States) Kenny McKanveer	(Spain) Toni Soler	(Libya) Yasseine Amir Gaddafi				
SP Falcons	(Brazil) Vlademir Everton	(Brazil) Thiago Tomias	(Egypt) Aziz Ben Mahmoud	(Chinese Taipei) Li-Kwee Seunng	(Serbia) Nemanja Kruševac	(Japan) Taiyo Toyoda	(Brazil) Thiago Bahiense (Japan) Shoya Nagata (Afghanistan) Kvanger Burekki	
Hunters Mongolia	(Egypt) Lin Youssef	(Libya) Youssef Gaddafi Yahiya	(Indonesia) Yandi Dieebu					
Erchim	(Japan) Hiroya Kiyomoto	(Japan) Yujin Takeuchi	(Libya) Yassef Marawi	(Japan) Kota Suemitsu				
Khangarid	(Russia) Kirill Petrushin	(Japan) Yuta Mishima	(Ghana) Kwadwo Acquah	(North Korea) Lee Kwang-Su	(Libya) Umim Salleh	(Iran) Reza Omid Alireza		(Japan) Shogo Akiba (Serbia) Djordje Ivljanin (Uzbekistan) Khozhiakbar Muminov (Japan) Yuta Komura
Bishrelt Khoromkhon	(Egypt) Shaheen Amir	(Japan) Masaya Tahara	(Japan) Ryo Kato	(Afghanistan) Zeze	(Bermuda) Geroge Hiazéièk	(Uzbekistan) Mironshokh Sattorov		
Khovdyn Khuleguud	(Japan) Masaki Honda	(Syria) Hamadi	(Palestine) Ben Yadi	(Afghanistan) Maher Hasseen	(North Korea) Kim-Pak Sung			
Tuv Azarganuud	(Japan) Kohane Yamakami	(Mexico) Hugo Zambrano						
Ulaanbaatar	(Iran) Omid Yahassan	(Afghanistan) Ullah Megtiane	(Afghanistan) Maher Ullah Rehman	(South Korea) Park Seong-gyeol	(Northern Mariana Islands) Akiereze McKenzie	(Uzbekistan) Islom Shodmonov		

== Managerial changes ==
Team	Outgoing manager	Manner of departure	Date of vacancy	Position in table	Replaced by	Date of appointment
Ulaanbaatar	(Serbia) Vojislav Bralušić	Mutually agreed	April 2024	4th	(Germany) Andreas Spier	August 2024
Ulaanbaatar	(Germany) Andreas Spier	Mutually agreed	June 2025			

== Standings ==
=== League table ===
Pos	Team	Pld	W	D	L	GF	GA	GD	Pts	Qualification or relegation
1	SP Falcons (C)	27	21	4	2	104	19	+85	67	Qualification for AFC Challenge League preliminary round (Note: Since the 2024-25 MFF Cup could not be completed in time for due to tightness of schedules and delays, the AFC Challenge League playoff spot will be passed to the Premier League runners-up.)
2	Khangarid	27	18	3	6	66	32	+34	57	Qualification for AFC Challenge League preliminary round
3	Ulaanbaatar	27	15	6	6	65	40	+25	51	
4	Deren	27	15	5	7	83	30	+53	50	
5	Bishrelt Khoromkhon	27	11	1	15	58	89	−31	34	
6	Khovdyn Khuleguud	27	9	5	13	69	61	+8	32	
7	Hunters Mongolia	27	8	5	14	38	49	−11	29	
8	Erchim	27	7	6	14	54	64	−10	27	
9	Tuv Azarganuud (O)	27	7	1	19	31	156	−125	22	Qualification to relegation play-off
10	Brera Ilch (R)	27	4	4	19	43	74	−31	16	Relegation to Mongolian First League

Source: Soccerway
Rules for classification: 1) Points; 2) Head-to-head points; 3) Head-to-head goal difference; 4) Head-to-head goals scored; 5) Goal difference; 6) Goals scored.
(C) Champions; (O) Relegation playoff winners; (R) Relegated

=== Position by round ===
Team ╲ Round	1	2	3	4	5	6	7	8	9	10	11	12	13	14	15	16	17	18	19	20	21	22	23	24	25	26	27
SP Falcons	7	5	7	5	6	3	3	2	1	3	3	1	2	1	1	1	1	1	1	1	1	1	1	1	1	1	1
Khangarid	4	6	4	6	5	4	4	4	4	4	4	4	4	5	5	3	3	4	3	3	3	2	2	2	2	2	2
Deren	2	2	2	1	1	1	1	3	3	2	1	2	1	2	2	2	2	3	2	2	2	3	3	3	3	3	4
Ulaanbaatar	5	3	3	2	3	5	5	5	5	5	5	5	5	4	4	4	4	2	4	4	4	4	4	4	4	4	3
Bishrelt Khoromkhon	3	7	5	3	4	6	6	6	6	6	6	6	6	6	6	6	6	6	6	6	5	5	5	5	5	5	5
Khovdyn Khuleguud	6	4	6	8	9	8	7	8	9	9	8	8	8	8	8	8	8	8	8	8	7	7	7	7	8	6	6
Hunters Mongolia	9	9	9	7	7	7	8	7	7	7	7	7	7	7	7	7	7	7	7	7	8	8	8	8	6	7	7
Erchim	1	1	1	4	2	2	2	1	2	1	2	3	3	3	3	5	5	5	5	5	6	6	6	6	7	8	8
Tuv Azarganuud	10	10	10	10	10	10	10	10	10	10	10	10	10	10	10	10	10	9	9	9	9	9	9	9	10	9	9
Brera Ilch	8	8	8	9	8	9	9	9	8	8	9	9	9	9	9	9	9	10	10	10	10	10	10	10	9	10	10

Qualification for AFC Challenge League preliminary round
Qualification for the relegation play-off
Relegation to Mongolian First League

Source: Soccerway

== Results ==
Teams play each other three times, twice in the first half of the season (home and away) and once in the second half of the season (either home or away) with each team playing 27 matches.

=== Fixture and results ===
Home \ Away	BRI	DER	HUN	KHA	KHG	KHN	KHO	SPF	TUV	UBA
Brera Ilch		0–3	0–0	2–2	0–4	0–2	2–1	1–0	1–2	1–5
Brera Ilch			0–1			1–7	1–4	2–5		
Deren	3–2		2–0	1–1	1–2	2–1	4–2	0–1	1–1	2–0
Deren	8–1				1–3	10–0	1–1			0–1
Hunters Mongolia	1–1	0–3		0–2	2–0	3–1	1–1	1–1	9–0	1–1
Hunters Mongolia		0–4		3–0	1–4				1–2	2–4
Erchim	4–1	2–2	0–1		1–2	0–0	1–3	1–1	14–0	3–2
Erchim	3–5	1–3							0–4	0–3
Khangarid	2–0	0–0	1–4	0–4		1–3	1–3	0–0	5–1	0–2
Khangarid	3–1			3–0						6–2
Bishrelt Khoromkhon	3–0	0–2	1–2	0–4	0–3		2–1	0–8	13–0	2–3
Bishrelt Khoromkhon			4–2	5–4	1–6			1–12	1–0	
Khovdyn Khuleguud	3–0	1–0	6–0	3–3	0–1	3–4		0–1	4–2	3–4
Khovdyn Khuleguud			1–4	3–0	2–5	10–2		1–5		
SP Falcons	2–0	2–1	2–0	3–1	3–1	5–1	5–0		12–0	0–1
SP Falcons		3–2	2–0	12–0	2–1				6–1	0–0
Tuv Azarganuud	1–20	0–21	2–0	0–2	0–4	2–1	0–7	0–7		1–11
Tuv Azarganuud	4–1	1–3			2–4		2–5			0–3
Ulaanbaatar	1–0	4–1	2–1	2–1	0–0	1–2	3–3	3–4	0–3	
Ulaanbaatar	0–0					4–1	3–3			

Source: Soccerway
Legend: Blue = home team win; Yellow = draw; Red = away team win.
For upcoming matches, an "a" indicates there is an article about the rivalry between the two participants.

=== Results by round ===
Team ╲ Round	1	2	3	4	5	6	7	8	9	10	11	12	13	14	15	16	17	18	19	20	21	22	23	24	25	26	27
Brera Ilch	L	L	W	L	D	L	L	W	W	L	L	L	L	D	L	D	L	L	L	L	L	D	L	L	W	L	L
Deren	W	W	D	W	W	W	L	L	W	W	W	D	W	D	W	D	L	L	W	W	W	D	W	W	L	L	L
Hunters Mongolia	L	L	D	W	D	L	L	W	W	L	D	L	L	D	W	D	L	W	L	L	L	L	W	W	W	L	L
Erchim	W	W	D	L	W	W	W	W	D	W	D	D	D	L	L	D	L	L	L	L	L	L	L	L	L	L	L
Khangarid	W	L	W	L	W	W	W	L	L	W	D	W	W	L	W	D	W	D	W	W	W	W	W	W	W	W	L
Bishrelt Khoromkhon	W	L	W	W	L	L	L	W	L	W	D	W	L	W	L	L	L	L	W	W	L	W	L	L	L	L	W
Khovdyn Khuleguud	L	W	L	L	L	D	L	L	D	L	W	L	L	L	L	D	W	W	L	W	W	D	L	D	L	W	W
SP Falcons	L	W	L	W	W	W	W	W	W	D	D	W	D	W	W	W	W	D	W	W	W	W	W	W	W	W	W
Tuv Azarganuud	L	L	L	L	L	L	L	L	L	L	L	L	W	D	L	W	W	W	W	L	L	L	L	L	L	W	W
Ulaanbaatar	W	W	D	W	L	D	W	L	L	D	D	W	W	W	W	L	W	W	L	L	W	D	W	D	W	W	W

Updated to match(es) played on 20 July 2025. Source: Soccerway

== Season statistics ==
=== Top goalscorers ===
Rank	Player	Team	Goals
1	(Japan) Yutaro Funami	Deren	31
2	(Mongolia) Batkhishig Myagmar	SP Falcons	19
3	(Japan) Kou Gotou	Erchim	18
4	(Mongolia) Oyunbaatar Mijiddorj	Ulaanbaatar	17
5	(Mongolia) Nyam-Osor Naranbold	Bishrelt Khoromkhon	13
6	(Uzbekistan) Mironshokh Sattorov	Bishrelt Khoromkhon	11
6	(Japan) Yuga Watanabe	Khovdyn Khuleguud	11
6	(Brazil) André Ferreira	SP Falcons	11
6	(Mongolia) Ankhbayar Sodmunkh	SP Falcons	11
6	(Mongolia) Namsrai Baatartsogt	SP Falcons	11

=== Multiple hat-tricks ===
Player	For	Against	Score	Date
(Japan) Kou Gotou^{7}	Erchim	Tuv Azarganuud	14–0	18 August 2024

== Attendances ==
The league average was 154:

#	Club	Average
1	Erchim	403
2	SP Falcons	209
3	Ulaanbaatar	188
4	Deren	154
5	Khangarid	150
6	Hunters Mongolia	125
7	Bishrelt Khoromkhon	99
8	Khovdyn Khuleguud	89
9	Tuv Azarganuud	65
10	Brera Ilch	55
