= 2023–24 Mongolian Premier League =

Mongolian Premier League season

Mongolian National Premier League
- Season: 2023–24
- Dates: 5 August 2023 – 30 June 2024
- Goals: 573
- Top goalscorer: (Mongolia) Nyam-Osor Naranbold; Vlademir Everton (25 goals each)

The 2023–24 Mongolian National Premier League is the 56th season of the Mongolian National Premier League, the highest football league in the country. Erchim FC were the defending champions. The league was known this season as the Mobi Premier League for sponsorship reasons. FC Ulaanbaatar were the eventual champions, winning their second title in club history. Ulaanbaatar City FC withdrew from the league without playing their final three matches. The club's match results were annulled. Khovd FC's Batkhyag Munkh-Erdene was the league's top scorer with 38 goals.

== Changes before the season ==
BCH Lions should have been relegated from 2021–22 Mongolian National Premier League but remained in the league after Athletic 220 withdrew.

== Teams ==
All matches were played at the MFF Football Centre in Ulaanbaatar, which has 5,000 capacity.

Team	City	Manager	Kit Manufacturer
BCH Lions	Ulaanbaatar	(Mongolia) B. Chin-Orgil	TG Sport
Deren	Deren	(Mongolia) Ch. Munkhbat	Joma
SP Falcons	Ulaanbaatar	(Mongolia) I.Otgonbayar	TG Sport
Khaan Khuns Erchim	Ulaanbaatar	(Mongolia) D.Batnasam	TG Sport
Khangarid FC	Erdenet	(Mongolia) A.Erdenebayar	TG Sport
Khoromkhon FC	Ulaanbaatar	(Mongolia) S.Purevsukh	TG Sport
Khovd FC	Khovd	(Mongolia) B.Garidmagnai	TG Sport
Tuv Azarganuud	Töv Province	TBC	Nike
Ulaanbaatar FC	Ulaanbaatar	(Serbia) Vojislav Bralušić	TG Sport

== Foreign players ==
The number of foreign players is restricted to 5 per team. There are no more additional restrictions.

Team	Player 1	Player 2	Player 3	Player 4	Player 5	Former players
BCH Lions	(Japan) Tomoaki Harada	(Japan) Imai Kanato	(Japan) Sasaki Mizuho	(Japan) Ikko Fujirawa	(Japan) Yusuki Miyajima	(Japan) Tomoya Watanabe
Deren	(Russia) Nikita Artemenko	(Russia) Savva Knyazev	(South Korea) Jung Tae-baek			
SP Falcons	(Brazil) André Ferreira	(Brazil) Matheus Guará	(Brazil) Thiago Bahiense	(Brazil) Thiago Tomais	(Brazil) Vlademir	
Khaan Khuns Erchim	(Japan) Riku Ichimura	(Japan) Daiki Yahana	(Japan) Yusuke Nitta	(South Korea) Kim Min-Seo		
Khangarid FC						
Khoromkhon FC	(Japan) Hiromasa Ishikawa	(Japan) Shota Atsumi	(Japan) Masatoshi Takeshita	(Japan) Takuma Negayoshi	(Japan) Shina Mizuki	
Khovd FC	(Japan) Ayumu Yamane	(Japan) Isami Aoi	(Japan) Ken Murayama	(Japan) Sho Otsuka	(Japan) Masaka Soma	
Tuv Azarganuud	(Brazil) Marcelinho Júnior	(Japan) Takaya Sugasawa	(Japan) Yuma Nishimura	(Japan) Ryusei Furukawa		
Ulaanbaatar FC	(Japan) Akihiro Suzuki	(Ghana) Abdul Rashid Obuobi	(Nigeria) Emeka Jacobs Emerun	(Serbia) Nemanja Krusevać		
Ulaanbaatar City	(Japan) Neo Tamura	(Russia) Igor Potapov				

== Managerial changes ==
Team	Outgoing manager	Manner of departure	Date of vacancy	Position in table	Replaced by	Date of appointment
Deren	(Slovakia) Marek Fabuľa	Signed by Tatran	December 2023	2nd	(Mongolia) Chimeddorj Munkhbat	
Tuv Azarganuud	(Mongolia) Chimeddorj Munkhbat	Signed by Deren	December 2023	7th		

== League table ==
Pos	Team	Pld	W	D	L	GF	GA	GD	Pts	Qualification
1	SP Falcons (C)	27	21	2	4	85	18	+67	65	Qualification for AFC Challenge League group stage
2	Khangarid	27	18	5	4	71	36	+35	59	
3	Deren	27	15	6	6	80	32	+48	51	
4	Ulaanbaatar	27	15	1	11	69	37	+32	46	
5	Tuv Azarganuud	27	14	3	10	72	47	+25	45	
6	Khoromkhon	27	14	1	12	70	66	+4	43	
7	Erchim	27	11	7	9	72	71	+1	40	
8	Brera Ilch FC	27	8	0	19	51	85	−34	24	
9	Khovd (O)	27	3	2	22	32	89	−57	11	Qualification to relegation play-offs
10	Bavarians FC (R)	27	2	1	24	33	154	−121	7	Relegation to Mongolian 1st League

Source: SoccerWay
Rules for classification: 1) Points; 2) Head-to-head points; 3) Head-to-head goal difference; 4) Head-to-head goals scored; 5) Goal difference; 6) Goals scored.
(C) Champions; (O) Relegation playoff winners; (R) Relegated

== Statistics ==
=== Top goalscorers ===
Rank	Player	Team	Goals
1	(Mongolia) Nyam-Osor Naranbold	Khoromkhon	25
1	(Brazil) Wlademir Everton	Falcons	25
3	(Mongolia) Tsedenbalyn Tümenjargal	Tuv Azarganuud	22
4	(Mongolia) Oyunbaataryn Mijiddorj	Ulaanbaatar	20
5	(Japan) Aoto Saito	Brera Ilch	19
6	(Japan) Yuta Mishima	Erchim	15
6	(Mongolia) Togoo Munkhbaatar	Khoromkhon	15
8	(Mongolia) Monkh Togoldor	Falcons	14
9	(Morocco) Salim Akaaba	Deren	13
9	(Mongolia) Zayat Teemulen	Khangarid	13

=== Multiple hat-tricks ===
Player	For	Against	Score	Date
(Mongolia) Dölgöön Amaraa	Deren	Tuv Azarganuud	5–3	5 August 2023
(Japan) Yuta Mishima	Erchim	Tuv Azarganuud	0–5	13 August 2023
(Mongolia) Zayat Temuulen	Khangarid	Bavarians	5–1	21 October 2023
(Mongolia) Tsedenbalyn Tümenjargal	Tuv Azarganuud	Khoromkhon	6–3	28 October 2023
(Japan) Hiroya Konno	Khangarid	Brera Ilch	1–7	29 October 2023
(Russia) Saša Teofanov	Ulaanbaatar	Erchim	5–0	2 November 2023
(Japan) Aoto Saito	Brera Ilch	Bavarians	1–8	8 March 2024
(Mongolia) Oyunbaataryn Mijiddorj	Ulaanbaatar	Bavarians	5–1	17 March 2024
(Mongolia) T Dalaitseren	Deren	Erchim	7–0	17 March 2024
(Mongolia) Zayat Temanul	Khangarid	Bavarians	0–5	22 April 2024
(Brazil) Wlademir Everton	Falcons	Bavarians	7–0	28 April 2024
(Mongolia) Batkhuyag Monkh-Erdene	Khovd	Erchim	5–3	3 May 2024
(Mongolia) Nyam-Osor Naranbold	Khoromkhon	Bavarians	2–4	5 May 2024
(Mongolia) Uuganbat Temuulen	Ulaanbaatar	Bavarians	1–8	15 May 2024
(Morocco) Salim Akaaba	Deren	Erchim	1–6	16 May 2024
(Mongolia) Tsedenbalyn Tümenjargal^{4}	Tuv Azarganuud	Bavarians	0–9	24 May 2024
(Mongolia) Oyunbaataryn Mijiddorj	Ulaanbaatar	Khoromkhon	3–2	26 May 2024
(Mongolia) Enkhbold Erkhembayar	Deren	Bavarians	12–0	1 June 2024
(Japan) Aoto Saito	Brera Ilch	Erchim	2–5	20 June 2024
(Japan) Kazuha Sudo	Tuv Azarganuud	Khovd	9–0	21 June 2024
(Mongolia) Altankhuu Sumyabazar	Falcons	Khoromkhon	2–6	22 June 2024
(Mongolia) Myagmar Bathishig	Falcons	Khoromkhon	2–6	22 June 2024
(Mongolia) Monkh Togoldor	Falcons	Bavarians	0–21	30 June 2024
(Brazil) Wlademir Everton^{10}	Falcons	Bavarians	0–21	30 June 2024
