= Khash-Erdene Tuya =

Mongolian footballer

Personal information
- Date of birth: 6 February 2001 (age 25)
- Place of birth: Mongolia
- Positions: Midfielder; right-back

Team information
- Current team: Deren

Senior career*
Years	Team	Apps	(Gls)
2017–	Deren		

International career^{‡}
2018–2020	Mongolia U19	8	(1)
2019	Mongolia U23	2	(0)
2021	Mongolia	3	(0)
- * Club domestic league appearances and goals ‡ National team caps and goals as of 10 June 2021

Khash-Erdene Tuya (born 6 February 2001), is a Mongolian professional footballer who plays as a midfielder and right-back for Mongolian Premier League club Deren.

== Club career ==
Tuya joined Mongolian Premier League club Deren in 2015 and was promoted to the senior squad in 2017. He was part of the Deren teams which finished as league runners-up 2021, 2022–23 and champions of the Mongolian Super Cup in 2022.

== International career ==
He made his debut internationally on 25 March 2021, in a 2022 FIFA World Cup qualifying match against Tajikistan in a 3–0 loss. On 30 March 2021, Tuya scored an own-goal in favour of Japan during a 14–0 defeat.

== Career statistics ==
=== Club ===
Appearances and goals by club, season and competition
Club	Season	League		
Club	Season	Division	Apps	Goals
Deren	2017	Mongolian Premier League	?	?
Deren	2018	Mongolian Premier League	?	?
Deren	2019	Mongolian Premier League	?	?
Deren	2020	Mongolian National Premier League	?	0
Deren	2021	Mongolian National Premier League	?	?
Deren	2021–22	Mongolian National Premier League	0	0
Deren	2022–23	Mongolian National Premier League	0	0
Deren	2023–24	Mongolian Premier League	?	?
Deren	2024–25	Mongolian Premier League	?	?
Deren	2025–26	Mongolian Premier League	?	?
Career total			?	?

=== International ===
Appearances and goals by national team and year
National team	Year	Apps	Goals
Mongolia	2021	3	0
Total		3	0

== Honours ==
Deren

- Mongolian National Premier League: runner-up 2021, 2022–23
- Mongolian Super Cup: 2022
