= 2016 Mongolian Futsal League =

Football league season in Mongolia

Mongolian Futsal League
- Season: 2016
- Matches: 55
- Goals: 791 (14.38 per match)
- Longest winning run: UBU FC 10 games
- Longest unbeaten run: UBU FC 10 games
- Longest winless run: Erchim; FC Ulaanbaatar 10 games
- Longest losing run: FC Ulaanbaatar 9 games

The 2016 Mongolian Futsal League also known as the Pepsi League is the 1st edition of the tournament. There are 12 teams from Mongolian Premier League and Mongolian First League. The season was started in January 2016.

== Pepsi League ==
The Mongolian Futsal League also known as the Pepsi League is the National Futsal Tournament of Mongolia. In 2015, the Mongolian Football Federation made the opinion for the League and in January 2016, the first tournament was begun.

== Clubs ==
Club	City
Arvis	Ulaanbaatar
Bayngol	Ulaanbaatar
Continental	Ulaanbaatar
Deren	Deren
Erchim	Ulaanbaatar
Khoromkhon	Ulaanbaatar
Khangarid	Erdenet
Selenge Press	Ulaanbaatar
Soyombiin Barsuud	Ulaanbaatar
Ulaanbaatar	Ulaanbaatar
Ulaanbaataryn Mazaalaynuud	Ulaanbaatar
Ulaanbaatryn Unaganuud	Ulaanbaatar

== League table ==
Pos	Team	Pld	W	D	L	GF	GA	GD	Pts
1	Ulaanbataryn Unaganuud	10	10	0	0	95	23	+72	30
2	Khangarid	10	9	0	1	85	47	+38	27
3	Khoromkhon	10	7	1	2	102	65	+37	22
4	Deren	10	6	2	2	61	42	+19	20
5	Continental	10	5	1	4	70	82	−12	16
6	Arvis	10	5	0	5	60	57	+3	15
7	Ulaanbaataryn Mazaalaynuud	10	4	1	5	53	65	−12	13
8	Selenge Press	10	4	0	6	69	79	−10	12
9	Bayngol	10	4	0	6	82	58	+24	12
10	Soyombiin Baarsuud	10	2	0	8	46	75	−29	6
11	Erchim	10	0	2	8	37	89	−52	2
12	Ulaanbaatar	10	0	1	9	31	109	−78	1

Updated to match(es) played on unknown. Source:
