= 2026 MFF Developmental League interim season =

MFF Developmental League
- Season: 2026
- Dates: 12 September – 19 October 2026
- Relegated: None
- All statistics correct as of 6 July 2026.

The 2026 MFF Developmental League interim season is one-off tournament held by the Mongolian Football Federation as it transitions the Mongolian Premier League to a summer schedule. The interim season will determine which club or clubs will enter the 2027–28 AFC Challenge League.

== Teams ==
Nine of the ten teams that will compete in the 2027 Mongolian Premier League season are participating in the interim league, including promoted Amtat FC and Erchim FC. Only Khangarid FC opted to sit out the competition and relinquish its chance to qualify for the AFC Challenge League. No clubs will be relegated this season.

- Amtat FC
- Central Stallions
- Deren
- Erchim
- Hunters
- Khovd Western
- Khovdyn Khuleguud
- Ulaanbaatar
- Ulaangom City

== Format ==
Every team will play the eight others one time each in the opening round. At the end of the round, clubs the top five clubs will be placed in the winners group while the bottom four clubs will be placed in the losers group. Each club will play the others in its new group twice to determine final standings.

== Standings ==
=== League tables ===
==== First round ====
Pos	Team	Pld	W	D	L	GF	GA	GD	Pts	Qualification or relegation
1	Central Stallions	2	2	0	0	5	0	+5	6	Qualification for AFC Challenge League Preliminary round
2	Deren	2	1	1	0	2	1	+1	4	Qualification for AFC Challenge League Preliminary round
3	Khovdyn Khuleguud	1	1	0	0	4	0	+4	3	
4	Erchim	2	1	0	1	2	2	0	3	
5	Khovd Western	2	1	0	1	4	5	−1	3	
6	Amtat	2	1	0	1	2	3	−1	3	
7	Ulaanbaatar	1	0	1	0	0	0	0	1	
8	Hunters Mongolia	2	0	0	2	1	5	−4	0	
9	Ulaangom City	2	0	0	2	1	5	−4	0	

Updated to match(es) played on 17 September 2026. Source: Mongolian Football Central
Rules for classification: 1) Points; 2) Head-to-head points; 3) Head-to-head goal difference; 4) Head-to-head goals scored; 5) Goal difference; 6) Goals scored.
