= Min Ki-tae =

South Korean footballer (born 2001)

Personal information
- Date of birth: 25 April 2001 (age 25)
- Place of birth: Daejeon, South Korea
- Height: 1.74 m (5 ft 9 in)
- Position: Forward

Team information
- Current team: Hunters FC
- Number: 10

Senior career*
Years	Team	Apps	(Gls)
2021–2025	Seoul Jungnang	18	(1)
2025–2026	Royal Thimphu College	12	(8)
2026–	Hunters FC	14	(24)
Korean name
Hangul	민기태
RR	Min Gitae
MR	Min Kit'ae
- * Club domestic league appearances and goals as of 12:28, 15 September 2026 (UTC)

Min Ki-tae (Korean: 민기태; born 25 April 2001) is a South Korean footballer who plays as a forward for Mongolian Premier League club Hunters FC.

== Club career ==
Born in Daejeon, Ki-tae began his career with local sides Suwon MB, Pyeongtaek SKK FC, and Geumcheon FC. Following his high school graduation, he joined Seoul Jungnang FC of the K4 League in 2021. He remained with Seoul Jungnang until June 2025. He, and the other two Koreans who signed at the same time, were the club's first-ever foreign signings.

Despite his quick success in Bhutan, Ki-tae signed for Hunters FC in the Mongolian Premier League during the winter 2026 transfer window, along with compatriot Kim Tae-min who had been at RTC with Ki-tae, for the spring half of the 2025–26 season. During his first half-season with the club, the striker scored twenty-four goals and provided a further eleven assists in just thirteen matches to win the Golden Boot award as the league's top scorer that season. His most dominant performance included a seven goal, two assist haul in an 11–1 victory over Ulaangom City FC on the final matchday. In the process, Ki-Tae became the first Korean player to win the award as Hunters FC finished the season fifth in the standings.

In September 2026, it was announced that Ki-tae had re-signed for Hunters FC for the 2026 season. Despite his club falling to Deren FC 1–2 in its opening match, Ki-tae resuming his offensive contributions, providing an assist on Kim Tae-min's goal.
