= Gantogtokh Gantuya =

Mongolian footballer

Personal information
- Full name: Gantogtokh Gantuya
- Date of birth: 14 May 1998 (age 28)
- Place of birth: Mongolia
- Position: Midfielder

Team information
- Current team: Ulaanbaatar
- Number: 17

Senior career*
Years	Team	Apps	(Gls)
2015–2019	Deren		
2019–2022	Ulaanbaatar City		
2022–2023	Tuv Buganuud		
2023–	Ulaanbaatar		

International career^{‡}
2021–	Mongolia	8	(1)
- * Club domestic league appearances and goals as of 13:42, 4 March 2022 (UTC) ‡ National team caps and goals as of 11:42, 11 June 2024 (UTC)

Gantogtokh Gantuya (born 14 May 1998) is a Mongolian footballer who plays as a midfielder for Mongolian Premier League club Ulaanbaatar and the Mongolian national team.

== Club career ==
In March 2022 Gantuya joined Tuv Buganuud from Ulaanbaatar City.

== International career ==
=== Youth ===
Gantuya made two appearances for Mongolia in 2020 AFC U-23 Championship qualification.

=== Senior ===
Gantuya made his Mongolia national team debut on 7 June 2021 in a 1–0 victory over Kyrgyzstan in the 2022 FIFA World Cup qualification. In June 2023, he represented Mongolia at the 2023 Intercontinental Cup in India.

On 11 June 2024, Gantuya scored his first international goal in a 2–1 win during the friendly match against Cambodia.

=== International goals ===
Scores and results list Mongolia's goal tally first.

No.	Date	Venue	Opponent	Score	Result	Competition
1.	11 June 2024	MFF Football Centre, Ulaanbaatar, Mongolia	Cambodia	2–1	2–1	Friendly
Last updated 11 June 2024

=== International statistics ===
As of match played 11 June 2024

Mongolia
Year	Apps	Goals
2021	1	0
2022	1	0
2023	3	0
2021	4	1
Total	9	1
