= Amtat FC =

Association football club in Mongolia

Amtat
- Full name: Amtat Football Club
- Short name: AFC
- Founded: 2021
- Ground: MFF Football Centre
- Capacity: 5,000
- Owner: Amtat Tsamkhag LLC
- League: Mongolian Premier League
- 2025–26: 1st, First League (promoted)
Home colours	Away colours

Amtat FC is a Mongolian professional football club based in Ulaanbaatar, currently competing in the Mongolian Premier League.

== History ==
The club was founded as WARD FC in 2021 by fans of the Premier League club Manchester United. That season, the club entered the National Amateur Cup, the fourth tier of football in Mongolia. After topping Group A with an undefeated record, WARD advanced to the final against Kharaatsai. Despite falling 3–5 in the match, the club earned promotion to the Second League the following season.

WARD won the First League title in 2026, with an undefeated record. The club's striker Namsrai Baatartsogt was the league's top scorer with eighteen goals, while its goalkeeper S. Batmagai and defender B. Ankhbayar were named best in the league for their positions. WARD was promoted to the Mongolian Premier League for the first time the following season. Prior to its first top-flight campaign, the club rebranded as Amtat FC, because of a substantial sponsorship from food importer and retailer Amtat. Amtat FC played its first Premier League match on 12 September 2026 against Central Stallions. Central Stallions won the match 2–0.

== Domestic history ==
Season	League							Domestic Cup	Notes
Season	Div.	Pos.	Pl.	W	D	L	P	Domestic Cup	Notes
2021	4th	2nd	6	5	0	1	9 (Group A)		Promoted to Second League
2021–22	3rd	8th	18	5	5	8	20		
2022–23	3rd	7th	18	6	3	9	21		
2023–24	3rd	5th	14	4	4	6	16		Promoted to First League
2024–25	2nd	8th	21	6	4	11	22		
2025–26	2nd	1st	8	8	0	0	21		Penalized three points, promoted to the Premier League
2026	1st								
