= Namsrai Baatartsogt =

Mongolian footballer (born 1998)

Personal information
- Full name: Namsrai Baatartsogt; Намсрай Баатарцогт
- Date of birth: 21 November 1998 (age 27)
- Place of birth: Mongolia
- Height: 1.70 m (5 ft 7 in)
- Position: Centre-forward

Team information
- Current team: Bulgan SP Falcons

Senior career*
Years	Team	Apps	(Gls)
–2019	Soyombiin Baarsuud		
2019–2021	Khovd Western		
2022–2023	Ulaanbaatar City		
2023–	Bulgan SP Falcons		

International career^{‡}
2022–	Mongolia	7	(0)
- * Club domestic league appearances and goals as of 21:01, 17 March 2024 (UTC) ‡ National team caps and goals as of 21:01, 17 March 2024 (UTC)

Namsrai Baatartsogt (Mongolian: Намсрай Баатарцогт; born 21 November 1998) is a Mongolian professional footballer who plays as a forward for Mongolian Premier League club Bulgan SP Falcons and the Mongolian national team.

== Club career ==
Through the 2019 season, Baatartsogt played for Soyombiin Baarsuud of the Mongolian First League. That season he was the league's top scorer with twenty seven goals and was given the league's Best Forward award. Baatartsogt was a nominee for Best Male Player at the annual MFF Golden Ball Awards following the season.

He moved to Khovd Western FC for the 2020 campaign. A season later he was again the league's top scorer with eighteen goals and named the league's best forward as Khovd Western finished third in the table.

Prior to the 2021 Mongolian Premier League season, Baatartsogt joined Ulaanbaatar City FC on a 4-year contract. He finished his first season with the club tied for sixth in the league with nine goals.

== International career ==
Baatartsogt made his senior international debut on 8 June 2022 in a 2023 AFC Asian Cup qualification match against Palestine.

=== International statistics ===
As of match played 17 October 2023

Mongolia
Year	Apps	Goals
2022	3	0
2023	4	0
Total	7	0
