= Deren =

Deren is a given name. Notable people with the name include:

- Deren, Dundgovi, a sum (district) of Dundgovi Province in southern Mongolia

== Surname ==
- Dalia Blimke-Dereń (born 1979), Polish chess master
- Mark Paul Deren (born 1980), American artist and designer
- Maya Deren (1917–1961), American filmmaker and film theorist

== Given name ==
- Deren Ibrahim (born 1991), Gibraltarian footballer
- Deren Ney, American musician
- Xia Deren (born 1955), Chinese politician

== See also ==
- Derren
- Van Deren, a surname
