= Otgonbayar =

Otgonbayar is a Mongolian surname and given name. Notable people with the name include:

- Dambyn Otgonbayar (born 1973), Mongolian guitarist
- Ishdorjiin Otgonbayar (born 1968), Mongolian football coach
- Luvsanlkhündegiin Otgonbayar (born 1982), Mongolian runner
- Otgonbayar Oyunbaatar (born 1993), Mongolian footballer
- Ravsalyn Otgonbayar (born 1955), Mongolian boxer
