= 2018 Mongolian First League =

Football tournament season in Mongolia

2018 Mongolia First League

Tournament details
- Country: Mongolia
- Dates: 2018
- Teams: 11

Final positions
- Champions: Ulaanbaataryn Unaganuud FC
- Runners-up: Khoromkhon FC
- All statistics correct as of 21-04-21.

2018 Mongolian First League (often referred to as the 2018 Mongolian 1st League) is Second-highest division of the Mongolia.

== Participating teams ==
- Khaan Khuns Crown Club
- Khan-Uul Duureg FC
- Khoromkhon FC
- Khovd Club
- FC Sumida
- Ulaanbaataryn Mazaalaynuud FC
- Khuree Khovguud FC
- Şaryn Gol FC
- Soëmbyn Barsuud FC
- Ulaanbaataryn Unaganuud FC
- Western FC

== Promoted Teams ==
With 10 wins the Ulaanbaataryn Unaganuud FC team added 30 points and finished the competition in first place. With that, in addition to the title of champion of the competition, the team won the right to compete in the Mongolian Premier League next season.

With only three points less, team Khoromkhon FC finished the competition in second place and was also promoted to the Mongolian Premier League. The team managed to add 27 points with 9 wins, and 1 losses.

== Demoted Teams ==
With one win, one draw and eight losses, the Khuree Khovguud team scored just four points and was relegated together with the debuting Şaryn Gol FC team who had seven defeats, three draws and no wins.

== Final classification ==
1.Ulaanbaataryn Unaganuud FC  10  10  0  0  61- 4  30  [R]
2.Khoromkhon FC               10   9  0  1  34- 2  27  [R]  Promoted

3.Khaan Khuns Crown Club      10   6  2  2  33-16  20       Promoted
4.Western FC                  10   6  1  3  28-29  19
5.Khovd Club                  10   5  1  4  18-21  16  [P]
6.Soëmbyn Barsuud             10   5  1  4  26-19  16
7.Khan-Uul Duureg             10   2  2  6  10-25   8  [P]
8.FC Sumida                   10   2  2  6  12-26   8  [P]
9.Ulaanbaataryi Mazaalaynuud  10   2  1  7   7-33   7
10.Khuree Khovguud            10   1  1  8  19-53   4  [P]
11.Şaryn Gol                  10   0  3  7  10-30   3
