= 2020 Mongolian First League =

Football tournament season in Mongolia

2020 Mongolia First League

Tournament details
- Country: Mongolia
- Dates: 2 July – 11 October 2020
- Teams: 10

Final positions
- Champions: BCH Lions
- Runners-up: Khoromkhon FC

Tournament statistics
- Matches played: 90
- Goals scored: 474 (5.27 per match)
- All statistics correct as of 21-04-21.

2020 Mongolian First League (often referred to as the 2020 Mongolian 1st League) is Second-highest division of the Mongolia.

The competition started on July 2, as the match between Khan-Uul and Khovd Western.

The league ended on October 11 with the match between BCH Lions and Döchin Myangat United (DMU).

== Participating teams ==
- BCH Lions
- Khoromkhon FC
- Khovd FC
- Tuv Buganuud FC
- DMU FC
- Aldariin Daychid FC
- Khovd Western FC
- Deren-2
- Khökh Chononuud FC
- Khan-Uul FC

== Final classification ==
1.BCH Lions                   50  45 5 0  167-14  140  [P]  Promoted

2.Khoromkhon                  50  39  10  1  121-30  127 [R]  Promotion Playoff
- - - - - - - - - - - - - - - - - - - - - - - - - - -
3.Khovd Club                   50 32  18  0  112-37  114
4.Tuv Buganuud                 50 27 12 11   107-56  93
5.DMU                          50  24 10 16  101-65  82  [*]
6.Aldariin Daychid             50  22 13 15  96-74  79  [N]
7.Khovd Western                50  19 23 8   88-77  70
8.Deren-2                      50  15 14 21  78-89  59  [P]

9.Khukh Chononuud              50   1 4 45  18-125   7  [P]
10.Khan-Uul                    50   0 4 46  6-145   4     Relegated
