= 2019 Mongolian First League =

Football tournament season in Mongolia

2019 Mongolia First League

Tournament details
- Country: Mongolia
- Dates: 2019
- Teams: 10

Final positions
- Champions: Gepro FC
- Runners-up: Ulaanbaataryn Unaganuud FC
- All statistics correct as of 21-04-21.

2019 Mongolian First League (often referred to as the 2019 Mongolian 1st League) is Second-highest division of the Mongolia.

== Participating teams ==
- DMU FC
- Sumida-Gepro FC
- Gepro FC
- Khan-Uul Duureg
- Khovd Club
- Khuree Khovguud FC
- Soëmbyn Barsuud FC
- Tuv Buganuud FC
- Ulaanbaataryn Unaganuud FC
- Western FC

== Note ==
Unclear why Arvis FC and Ulaanbaataryn Unaganuud FC did not enter; presumably they were refused a license.

== Promoted Teams ==
With 12 wins, 3 draws and 3 losses, the Gepro FC team added 39 points and finished the competition in first place. With that, in addition to the title of champion of the competition, the team won the right to compete in the Mongolian Premier League next season.

With only 2 points less, team Ulaanbaataryi Mazaalaynuud finished the competition in second place and was also promoted to the Mongolian Premier League. The team managed to add 37 points with 11 wins, 4 draws and 3 losses.

== Demoted Teams ==
With four wins, three draws and eleven losses, the FC Sumida team scored just 15 points and was relegated together with the Khuree Khovguud FC team who had fifteen defeats, two draws and only one victory.

== Final classification ==
1.Gepro FC                    18  12  3  3  52-33  39  [R]                   Promoted
2.Ulaanbaataryn Unaganuud FC  18  11  4  3  48-19  37                        Promoted

3.DMU FC                      18  12  1  5  54-34  37  [P]
4.Khovd Club                  18  10  4  4  53-22  34
5.Soëmbyn Barsuud             18   7  5  6  43-35  26
6.Western FC                  18   7  4  7  39-36  25
7.Khan-Uul Duureg             18   5  3 10  29-52  18
8.Tuv Buganuud                18   4  5  9  25-31  17  [P]

9.FC Sumida                   18   4  3 11  28-54  15                        Relegated
10.Khuree Khovguud            18   1  2 15  30-85   5                        Relegated
