= Pepsi League =

Pepsi League may refer to:

- Úrvalsdeild, the national Icelandic association football league, currently sponsored by PepsiCo, and known in Icelandic as Pepsi-deildin
- 2016 Mongolian Futsal League, also known as the Pepsi League, an inter-league futsal tournament in Mongolia
- Men's Division A of the Lebanese Basketball League, currently sponsored by PepsiCo
