= Davaadelger Oktyabri =

Mongolian footballer

Personal information
- Full name: Davaadelger Oktyabri
- Date of birth: 5 June 2000 (age 26)
- Place of birth: Mongolia
- Height: 1.83 m (6 ft 0 in)
- Position: Defender

Team information
- Current team: Deren
- Number: 4

Youth career
- 2013–2016: Deren

Senior career*
Years	Team	Apps	(Gls)
2017–	Deren		

International career^{‡}
2015	Mongolia U17	2	(0)
2017	Mongolia U20	2	(0)
2021	Mongolia U23	1	(0)
2021–	Mongolia	1	(0)
- * Club domestic league appearances and goals as of 13:42, 8 March 2022 (UTC) ‡ National team caps and goals as of 13:42, 8 March 2022 (UTC)

Davaadelger Oktyabri (born 5 June 2000) is a Mongolian footballer who plays as a defender for Mongolian Premier League club Deren FC and the Mongolian national team.

== International career ==
Oktyabri represented Mongolia at the youth level in 2016 AFC U-16 Championship qualification, 2018 AFC U-19 Championship qualification, and 2022 AFC U-23 Asian Cup qualification. He made his senior international debut on 7 June 2021 in a 1–0 victory over Kyrgyzstan in 2022 FIFA World Cup qualification.

=== International statistics ===
As of match played 7 June 2021

Mongolia
Year	Apps	Goals
2021	1	0
Total	1	0
