= 2025–26 AFC Challenge League =

- Jaber Al-Ahmad International Stadium in Kuwait City hosted the final

Tournament details
- Dates: Qualifying: 12 August 2025; Competition proper: 25 October 2025 – 13 May 2026
- Teams: Competition proper: 20; Total: 29 (from 17 associations)

Final positions
- Champions: Al-Kuwait (1st title)
- Runners-up: (Cambodia) PKR Svay Rieng

Tournament statistics
- Matches played: 40
- Goals scored: 135 (3.38 per match)
- Attendance: 185,784 (4,645 per match)
- Top scorer(s): (Ghana) Kwame Peprah (8 goals)
- Best player: (Egypt) Amoory
- Fair play award: (Cambodia) Svay Rieng

The 2025–26 AFC Challenge League was the 12th edition of the Asia's third-tier continental club football competition, organized by the Asian Football Confederation (AFC), and the second under the AFC Challenge League title.

The final was played on 13 May 2026 at the Jaber Al-Ahmad International Stadium in Kuwait City, Kuwait, with Kuwaiti club Al-Kuwait defeating Cambodian club Svay Rieng 4–3 to win their first Challenge League and fourth Asian title.

Arkadag were the reigning champions, but did not defend their title as the Challenge League winners automatically qualified for the Champions League Two group stage. The winners of the 2025–26 AFC Challenge League automatically qualified for the 2026–27 AFC Champions League Two group stage.

== Association team allocation ==
The associations are allocated slots according to their club competitions ranking which was published after the 2023–24 competitions were completed.

Participation for 2025–26 AFC Challenge League
Participating
Not participating

West Region (3 groups)
Rank		Member association	Points	Slots	
Rank		Member association	Points	Group stage	Play-off
Zone	AFC	Member association	Points	Group stage	Play-off
10	18	Tajikistan	22.493	0 (+1 ACL2)	0
11	19	Turkmenistan	20.217	1	0
12	20	Oman	20.048	1 (+1 ACL2)	0
13	21	Lebanon	18.711	2	0
14	22	Kuwait	17.818	1	1
15	24	Bangladesh	17.125	0	2
16	26	Syria	15.972	0	2
17	27	Kyrgyzstan	15.500	0	2
18	30	Maldives	10.490	0	1
19	35	Palestine	4.984	0	0
20	38	Nepal	0.917	0	0
21	39	Sri Lanka	0.555	0	0
22	40	Bhutan	0.505	0	1
23	42	Afghanistan	0.075	0	1
24	43	Pakistan	0.000	0	0
24	43	Yemen	0.000	0	0
Total		Participating associations: 10		7	10
Total		Participating associations: 10		17	

East Region (2 groups)
Rank		Member association	Points	Slots	
Rank		Member association	Points	Group stage	Play-off
Zone	AFC	Member association	Points	Group stage	Play-off
10	25	Philippines	16.230	0 (+1 ACL2)	0
11	28	Indonesia	14.816	1	0
12	29	North Korea	13.923	0	0
13	31	Cambodia	10.375	1	1
14	32	Myanmar	7.581	1	1
15	33	Chinese Taipei	6.978	0	2
16	34	Mongolia	5.300	0	2
17	36	Macau	3.770	0	0
18	37	Laos	1.198	0	1
19	41	Brunei	0.100	0	1
20	43	Guam	0.000	0	0
20	43	Northern Mariana Islands	0.000	0	0
20	43	Timor-Leste	0.000	0	0
Total		Participating associations: 7		4	8
Total		Participating associations: 7		12	

Notes

1. AFC Licensing (AFC1): Association did not have a licensed club.
2. AFC Slots (AFC2): The indirect slot of one of the Member Associations that did not enter a team was redistributed to the next highest eligible Member Association. However, for the East Region, the fifth slot – which was to be reallocated to either Laos or Brunei – had to be forfeited, since both member associations had only one licensed team.
3. Lebanon (LBN): The team with the additional indirect slot received a bye in the play-off round due to an insufficient number of participating teams.
4. Palestine (PLE): Association did not enter a team.

== Teams ==
Entry round	West Region			East Region		
Group stage	Team	Qualifying method	App. (last)	Team	Qualifying method	App. (last)
Group stage	(Tajikistan) Regar-TadAZ Tursunzoda	2025–26 AFC Champions League Two preliminary stage losers	5th (2009)	(Philippines) Manila Digger	2025–26 AFC Champions League Two preliminary stage loser	1st
Group stage	(Oman) Al-Seeb	2025–26 AFC Champions League Two preliminary stage losers	2nd (2024–25)	(Indonesia) Dewa United Banten	2024–25 Liga 1 runners-up	1st
Group stage	(Oman) Al-Shabab	2024–25 Sultan Qaboos Cup winners	1st	(Cambodia) PKR Svay Rieng	2024–25 Cambodian Premier League champions	3rd (2024–25)
Group stage	(Turkmenistan) Altyn Asyr	2024 Ýokary Liga third place	1st	(Myanmar) Shan United	2024–25 Myanmar National League champions	4th (2024–25)
Group stage	(Lebanon) Al-Ansar	2024–25 Lebanese Premier League champions	1st			
Group stage	(Lebanon) Safa	2024–25 Lebanese Premier League runners-up	1st			
Group stage	Al-Kuwait	2024–25 Kuwaiti Premier League champions	1st			
Preliminary stage participants	(Kuwait) Al-Arabi	2024–25 Kuwaiti Premier League runners-up	2nd (2024–25)	(Cambodia) Phnom Penh Crown	2024–25 Hun Sen Cup winners	5th (2012)
Preliminary stage participants	(Bangladesh) Dhaka Abahani	2024–25 Bangladesh Premier League runners-up	6th (2013)	(Myanmar) Yangon United	2025 MNL League Cup winners	1st
Preliminary stage participants	(Bangladesh) Bashundhara Kings	2024–25 Bangladesh Federation Cup winners	2nd (2024–25)	(Chinese Taipei) Tainan City	2024 Taiwan Football Premier League champions 2025 Taiwan President FA Cup winners	2nd (2024–25)
Preliminary stage participants	(Syria) Al-Karamah	2024–25 Syrian Premier League runners-up	1st	(Chinese Taipei) Taichung Futuro	2024 Taiwan Football Premier League runners-up	1st
Preliminary stage participants	(Syria) Hutteen	2024–25 Syrian Premier League third-place	1st	(Mongolia) SP Falcons	2024–25 Mongolian Premier League champions	2nd (2024–25)
Preliminary stage participants	(Kyrgyzstan) Abdysh-Ata Kant	2024 Kyrgyz Premier League champions	2nd (2024–25)	(Mongolia) Khangarid	2024–25 Mongolian Premier League runners-up	1st
Preliminary stage participants	(Kyrgyzstan) Muras United	2024 Kyrgyzstan Cup winners	1st	(Laos) Ezra	2024–25 Lao League 1 champions	1st
Preliminary stage participants	(Maldives) Maziya	2023 Dhivehi Premier League champions	2nd (2024–25)	(Brunei) Kasuka	2024–25 Brunei Super League champions	1st
Preliminary stage participants	(Bhutan) Paro	2024 Bhutan Premier League champions	2nd (2024–25)			
Preliminary stage participants	(Afghanistan) Abu Muslim	2024–25 Afghanistan Champions League champions	1st			

Notes

1. Bangladesh (BAN): Mohammedan, winner of the 2024–25 Bangladesh Premier League champions, failed to obtain an AFC license. Instead, the runners-up, Abahani Dhaka, qualified for the Challenge League qualifying playoffs.
2. Chinese Taipei (TPE): As 2025 Taiwan President FA Cup winners Tainan City TSG already qualified for the Challenge League playoffs via their league position, the spot reserved for the Taiwan President FA Cup winners was transferred to the 2024 Taiwan Football Premier League runners-up, Futuro.
3. Lebanon (LBN): Since the 2024–25 Lebanese FA Cup could not take place due to escalation of the conflict in the south with Israel, the AFC Challenge League playoff spot was passed to the Premier League runners-up, Safa.
4. Kuwait (KUW): Since the 2024–25 Kuwait Emir Cup could not be completed in time for due to tightness of schedules, the AFC Challenge League playoff spot was passed to the Premier League runners-up, Al-Arabi.
5. Maldives (MDV): The 2024 Dhivehi Premier League was not held. The teams from Maldives are determined by the results of the 2023 Dhivehi Premier League. Thus Maziya, the 2023 Dhivehi Premier League champions, participate in the AFC Challenge League group stage.
6. Mongolia (MGL): Since the 2024–25 MFF Cup could not be completed in time for due to tightness of schedules and delays, the AFC Challenge League playoff spot will be passed to the Premier League runners-up, Khangarid.
7. Syria (SYR): Since the 2024–25 Syrian Cup could not take place due to the ongoing political situation and hostilities in Syria, the AFC Challenge League playoff spots were awarded based on the Premier League standings. Al-Ittihad Ahli, winner of the 2024–25 Syrian Premier League champions, failed to obtain an AFC license. Instead, the runners-up, Al-Karamah and third-place, Hutteen, qualified for the Challenge League qualifying playoffs.
8. Turkmenistan (TKM): Arkadag, winner of the 2024 Ýokary Liga and 2024 Turkmenistan Cup, also won the 2024–25 AFC Challenge League and qualified for the Champions League Two group stage. The 2024 Ýokary Liga runners-up Ahal and third place Altyn Asyr qualify for the Champions League Two qualifying playoffs and Challenge League group stage respectively.

== Schedule ==
The quarter-finals and semi-finals for the West region were postponed due to the impacts from the 2026 Iran War. The AFC later announced that the quarter-finals and semi-finals for the West region would be played as single legged ties at Dolen Omurzakov Stadium in Bishkek, Kyrgyzstan.

The schedule of the competition is as follows.

Stage	Round	Draw date	West region	East region
Preliminary stage		No draw (Note: Pre-determined format. Teams from the same association could not be drawn into the same tie.)	12 August 2025	
Group stage	Matchday 1	28 August 2025	25 October 2025	26 October 2025
Group stage	Matchday 2	28 August 2025	28 October 2025	29 October 2025
Group stage	Matchday 3	28 August 2025	31 October 2025	1 November 2025
Knockout stage	Quarter-finals	No draw (Note: Pre-determined format. Teams are placed in the bracket based on their group stage results.)	19 April 2026 (Note: Postponed due to the impacts from the 2026 Iran War.)	5 and 12 March 2026
Knockout stage	Semi-finals	No draw	22 April 2026	9 and 16 April 2026
Knockout stage	Final	No draw	9 May 2026 at Jaber Al-Ahmad International Stadium, Kuwait City	

== Preliminary stage ==
The bracket of the preliminary stage was determined based on each team's seeding, with the higher seeded hosting the match. Teams from the same association could not be placed into the same tie. The winners of the preliminary stage (five from West and four from East) advanced to the group stage of the competition.

Team 1	Score	Team 2
West Region
Dhaka Abahani (Bangladesh)	0–2	(Kyrgyzstan) Muras United
Al-Karamah (Syria)	0–1	(Bangladesh) Bashundhara Kings
Abdysh-Ata (Kyrgyzstan)	5–2	(Syria) Hutteen
Maziya (Maldives)	0–4	(Kuwait) Al-Arabi
Paro (Bhutan)	1–0	(Afghanistan) Abu Muslim
East Region
Tainan City (Chinese Taipei)	4–1	(Mongolia) Khangarid
SP Falcons (Mongolia)	3–1	(Chinese Taipei) Taichung Futuro
Yangon United (Myanmar)	1–1 (3–5 p)	(Laos) Ezra
Kasuka (Brunei)	0–6	(Cambodia) Phnom Penh Crown

=== West Region ===
12 August 2025
17:00 UTC+6

Dhaka Abahani (Bangladesh)	0–2	(Kyrgyzstan) Muras United
	AFC Report; GSA Report	Dzhumashev 48', 90+2'

National Stadium, Dhaka
Attendance: 3,628
Referee: Torphong Somsing (Thailand)

12 August 2025
20:30 UTC+3

Al-Karamah (Syria)	0–1	(Bangladesh) Bashundhara Kings
	AFC Report; GSA Report	Sunday 6'

Suheim bin Hamad Stadium, Doha (Qatar) (Note: Al-Karamah was required to play their home match at a neutral venue due to security concerns relating to the Israeli invasion of Syria.)
Attendance: 2,667
Referee: Firdavs Norsafarov (Uzbekistan)

12 August 2025
20:00 UTC+6

Abdysh-Ata (Kyrgyzstan)	5–2	(Syria) Hutteen
Kozlov 20', 38', 80'; Atabayev 25'; Abbasov 87'	AFC Report; GSA Report	Younes 59'; Shoufan 90+4'

Dolen Omurzakov Stadium, Bishkek
Attendance: 3,856
Referee: Ngô Duy Lân (Vietnam)

12 August 2025
15:00 UTC+5

Maziya (Maldives)	0–4	(Kuwait) Al-Arabi
	AFC Report; GSA Report	Iwuala 3'; Ngoy 41'; John 55'; Ashkanani 87'

National Football Stadium, Malé
Attendance: 500
Referee: Ahmed Faisal Al-Ali (Jordan)

12 August 2025
18:00 UTC+6

Paro (Bhutan)	1–0	(Afghanistan) Abu Muslim
Asante 90+4'	AFC Report; GSA Report

Changlimithang Stadium, Thimphu (Note: Paro played their home match at Changlimithang Stadium, Thimphu, instead of their regular home stadium Woochu Sports Arena in Paro, which did not meet AFC requirements.)
Attendance: 3,200
Referee: Clifford Daypuyat (Philippines)

=== East Region ===
12 August 2025
19:30 UTC+8

Tainan City (Chinese Taipei)	4–1	(Mongolia) Khangarid
Aranda 22'; Sakkouh 58'; Benchy 81'; Bilguun 90+4' (o.g.)	AFC Report; GSA Report	Asano 71'

Taipei Municipal Stadium, Taipei
Attendance: 1,079
Referee: Zayniddin Alimov (Kyrgyzstan)

12 August 2025
16:00 UTC+8

SP Falcons (Mongolia)	3–1	(Chinese Taipei) Taichung Futuro
Ayvazov 6', 88'; Ankhbayar 90+3'	AFC Report; GSA Report	Saito 60'

MFF Football Centre, Ulanbaatar
Attendance: 846
Referee: Abdullo Davlatov (Tajikistan)

12 August 2025
16:00 UTC+6:30

Yangon United (Myanmar)	1–1 (a.e.t.)	(Laos) Ezra
Kaung Sithu 97'	AFC Report; GSA Report	Anantaza 109'
Penalties
Mogou (penalty scored); Ar Kar Kyaw (penalty scored); David Htan (penalty missed); Kaung Sithu (penalty scored)	3–5	(penalty scored) Phathana; (penalty scored) Anantaza; (penalty scored) Peter; (penalty scored) Shimomura; (penalty scored) Phommavong

Thuwunna Stadium, Yangon
Attendance: 512
Referee: Wong Wai Lun (Hong Kong)

12 August 2025
20:15 UTC+8

Kasuka (Brunei)	0–6	(Cambodia) Phnom Penh Crown
	AFC Report; GSA Report	Long Phearath 27', 64'; Dyer 67', 90+4'; Sa Ty 72'; Feher 80'

Hassanal Bolkiah Stadium, Bandar Seri Begawan
Attendance: 1,263
Referee: Virendha Rai (Bhutan)

== Group stage ==
Location of the 2025–26 AFC Challenge League group stage teams
Brown: Group A; Green: Group B; Orange: Group C;
Yellow: Group D; Pink: Group E

=== West Region ===
==== Group A ====
Pos	Team	Pld	W	D	L	GF	GA	GD	Pts	Qualification	ALS	ATA	AAK	PAR
1	(Oman) Al-Shabab	3	3	0	0	6	2	+4	9	Advance to Quarter-finals		3–1	2–1	1–0
2	(Turkmenistan) Altyn Asyr	3	2	0	1	5	4	+1	6				1–0	3–1
3	(Kyrgyzstan) Abdysh-Ata Kant	3	0	1	2	4	6	−2	1					3–3
4	(Bhutan) Paro (H)	3	0	1	2	4	7	−3	1					

Source: AFC
Rules for classification: Tiebreakers
(H) Hosts

==== Group B ====
Pos	Team	Pld	W	D	L	GF	GA	GD	Pts	Qualification	ALK	ALA	ASB	BSK
1	Al-Kuwait (H)	3	2	1	0	6	3	+3	7	Advance to Quarter-finals		3–2	1–1	2–0
2	(Lebanon) Al-Ansar	3	2	0	1	7	4	+3	6	Advance to Quarter-finals			2–1	3–0
3	(Oman) Al-Seeb	3	1	1	1	5	5	0	4					3–2
4	(Bangladesh) Bashundhara Kings	3	0	0	3	2	8	−6	0					

Source: AFC
Rules for classification: Tiebreakers
(H) Hosts

==== Group C ====
Pos	Team	Pld	W	D	L	GF	GA	GD	Pts	Qualification	MRU	AAR	SSC	RTT
1	(Kyrgyzstan) Muras United (H)	3	1	2	0	3	1	+2	5	Advance to Quarter-finals		1–1	2–0	0–0
2	(Kuwait) Al-Arabi	3	1	2	0	5	4	+1	5				2–2	2–1
3	(Lebanon) Safa	3	1	1	1	4	5	−1	4					2–1
4	(Tajikistan) Regar-TadAZ Tursunzoda	3	0	1	2	2	4	−2	1					

Source: AFC
Rules for classification: Tiebreakers
(H) Hosts

==== Ranking of second-placed teams ====
Pos	Grp	Team	Pld	W	D	L	GF	GA	GD	Pts	Qualification
1	B	(Lebanon) Al-Ansar	3	2	0	1	7	4	+3	6	Advance to Quarter-finals
2	A	(Turkmenistan) Altyn Asyr	3	2	0	1	5	4	+1	6	
3	C	(Kuwait) Al-Arabi	3	1	2	0	5	4	+1	5	

Source: AFC
Rules for classification: 1) points; 2) goal difference; 3) number of goals scored; 4) fair play ranking; 5) drawing of lots

=== East Region ===
==== Group D ====
Pos	Team	Pld	W	D	L	GF	GA	GD	Pts	Qualification	SVR	MDF	SPF	EZR
1	(Cambodia) PKR Svay Rieng (H)	3	2	1	0	8	2	+6	7	Advance to Quarter-finals		2–2	3–0	3–0
2	(Philippines) Manila Digger	3	2	1	0	7	3	+4	7	Advance to Quarter-finals			2–0	3–1
3	(Mongolia) SP Falcons	3	1	0	2	3	6	−3	3					3–1
4	(Laos) Ezra	3	0	0	3	2	9	−7	0					

Source: AFC
Rules for classification: Tiebreakers
(H) Hosts

==== Group E ====
Pos	Team	Pld	W	D	L	GF	GA	GD	Pts	Qualification	DUB	PPC	TNC	SNU
1	(Indonesia) Dewa United Banten (H)	3	2	1	0	9	2	+7	7	Advance to Quarter-finals		1–1	4–0	4–1
2	(Cambodia) Phnom Penh Crown	3	2	1	0	7	4	+3	7	Advance to Quarter-finals			3–2	3–1
3	(Chinese Taipei) Tainan City	3	1	0	2	4	8	−4	3					2–1
4	(Myanmar) Shan United	3	0	0	3	3	9	−6	0					

Source: AFC
Rules for classification: Tiebreakers
(H) Hosts

== Knockout stage ==
=== Bracket ===
Quarter-finals
(Lebanon) Al-Ansar	0
(Kyrgyzstan) Muras United	3
West Region
(Oman) Al-Shabab	3
Al-Kuwait	5
(Cambodia) Phnom Penh Crown	1	1	2
(Cambodia) PKR Svay Rieng	4	2	6
East Region
(Philippines) Manila Digger	1	2	3
(Indonesia) Dewa United Banten	0	2	2

Semi-finals
(Kyrgyzstan) Muras United	1
Al-Kuwait	2
(Cambodia) PKR Svay Rieng	1	3	4
(Philippines) Manila Digger	1	0	1

Final
Al-Kuwait (a.e.t.)	4
(Cambodia) PKR Svay Rieng	3

=== Quarter-finals ===
The West regions quarter-finals fixtures were postponed indefinitely by the AFC due to the impacts from the 2026 Iran war. The first legs for the East Region were played on 5 March, with the second legs on 12 March. The fixtures in the West Region were shortened to a single leg to be played on 19 April.

Team 1	Score	Team 2
West Region
Al Ansar (Lebanon)	0–3	(Kyrgyzstan) Muras United
Al-Shabab (Oman)	3–5	Al-Kuwait

Team 1	Agg.	Team 2	1st leg	2nd leg
East Region
Phnom Penh Crown (Cambodia)	2–6	(Cambodia) PKR Svay Rieng	1–4	1–2
Manila Digger (Philippines)	3–2	(Indonesia) Dewa United Banten	1–0	2–2

=== Semi-finals ===
The first legs for the East Region were played on 9 April, with the second legs on 16 April 2026. The single-legged fixture for the West Region was played on 22 April.

Team 1	Score	Team 2
West Region
Muras United (Kyrgyzstan)	1–2	Al-Kuwait

Team 1	Agg.	Team 2	1st leg	2nd leg
East Region
PKR Svay Rieng (Cambodia)	4–1	(Philippines) Manila Digger	1–1	3–0

=== Final ===
The final took place on 13 May 2026, with the team from the West Region hosting the final. The winners also qualified for the 2026–27 AFC Champions League Two group stage, unless they have already qualified for the Champions League Two through their league performance.

13 May 2026
19:45 UTC+3

Al-Kuwait	4–3 (a.e.t.)	(Cambodia) PKR Svay Rieng
Barrahma 48'; Marhoon 56'; Amoory 99'; Nasser 110'	Report	T. Alves 3'; Fujii 9'; Roque 96'

Jaber Al-Ahmad International Stadium, Ardiya
Attendance: 43,366
Referee: Qasim Al-Hatmi (Oman)

== Top scorers ==
Team eliminated / inactive for this round

Rank	Player	Team	MD1	MD2	MD3	QF1	QF2	SF1	SF2	F	Total
1	(Ghana) Kwame Peprah	(Cambodia) PKR Svay Rieng	2		1	3			2		8
2	(New Zealand) Moses Dyer	(Cambodia) Phnom Penh Crown	1	2	2	1	1				7
3	(The Gambia) Ousman Gai	(Philippines) Manila Digger	1	1	2		1	1			6
4	(Japan) Takashi Odawara	(Cambodia) PKR Svay Rieng	1	1			2				4
4	(Ethiopia) Kenean Markneh	(Oman) Al-Shabab	1		1	2					4
6	(Bahrain) Mohamed Marhoon	Al-Kuwait				1		1		1	3
6	(Egypt) Amoory	Al-Kuwait		1		1				1	3
6	(Kuwait) Yousef Nasser	Al-Kuwait	1		1					1	3
6	(Oman) Abdul Aziz Al-Muqbali	(Oman) Al-Seeb	1	1	1						3
6	(Palestine) Mohamad Hebous	(Lebanon) Al Ansar	1	1	1						3
6	(Japan) Riku Ichimura	(Bhutan) Paro		1	2						3
6	(Indonesia) Egy Maulana Vikri	(Indonesia) Dewa United Banten	1	1	1						3
6	(Argentina) Alexis Messidoro	(Indonesia) Dewa United Banten		2	1						3

Note

- Goals scored in the qualifying play-offs and matches voided by AFC are not counted when determining top scorer (Regulations Article 64.4)

== See also ==
- 2025–26 AFC Champions League Elite
- 2025–26 AFC Champions League Two
- 2025–26 AFC Women's Champions League
