= Bat-Orgil Gerelt-Od =

Mongolian footballer

Personal information
- Date of birth: 23 January 2002 (age 24)
- Place of birth: Mongolia
- Height: 1.82 m (6 ft 0 in)
- Position: Defender

Team information
- Current team: Ulaanbaatar
- Number: 4

Senior career*
Years	Team	Apps	(Gls)
2014–2020	Deren		
2020–2022	Ulaanbaatar City		
2022–	Ulaanbaatar		

International career
2018–2020	Mongolia U20	4	(1)
2020–	Mongolia U23	4	(0)
2021–	Mongolia	7	(0)
- * Club domestic league appearances and goals

Bat-Orgil Gerelt-Od (born 23 January 2002) is a Mongolian professional footballer who plays as a defender for Mongolian Premier League club Ulaanbaatar and the Mongolian national team.

== Club career ==
Gerelt-Od began his career with Deren FC. In January 2022 he joined FC Ulaanbaatar after his contract with Ulaanbaatar City had expired. He reportedly turned down higher offers to join the club.

== International career ==
Gerelt-Od represented Mongolia at the youth level in 2018 AFC U-19 Championship qualification, 2020 AFC U-19 Championship qualification, 2020 AFC U-23 Championship qualification, and 2022 AFC U-23 Asian Cup qualification. In qualification for the 2018 AFC U-19 Championship he scored one goal against Thailand and assisted on Ganbold Ganbayar's goal against Singapore.

Gerelt-Od made his senior international debut on 7 June 2021 in a 1–0 victory over Kyrgyzstan in 2022 FIFA World Cup qualification.

=== International statistics ===
As of match played 15 June 2023

Mongolia
Year	Apps	Goals
2021	1	0
2022	3	0
2023	3	0
Total	7	0
