= 2011 Mongolian Premier League =

Football league season in Mongolia

Mongolian Premier League
- Season: 2011
- Champions: FC Ulaanbaatar
- AFC President's Cup: Erchim

Statistics of Niislel Lig in the 2011 season. The title was won by FC Ulaanbaatar which was their first ever title.

== League standings ==
In the first round of the competition, all the teams played each other twice. The top four teams advanced to the semi-finals.

Pos	Team	Pld	W	D	L	GF	GA	GD	Pts	Qualification
1	Ulaanbaatar University	14	7	3	4	23	15	+8	24	Qualified for semi-finals
2	Khulguud	14	7	1	6	27	24	+3	22	Qualified for semi-finals
3	FC Ulaanbaatar	14	6	3	5	35	24	+11	21	Qualified for semi-finals
4	Khoromkhon	14	5	6	3	20	22	−2	21	Qualified for semi-finals
5	Erchim	14	6	3	5	23	20	+3	21	
6	Selenge Press	14	5	3	6	30	33	−3	18	
7	Khangarid	14	3	5	6	20	26	−6	14	
8	Ulaanbaataryn Mazaalaynuud	14	2	6	6	9	23	−14	12	

== Play-offs ==
=== Semi-finals ===
Team 1	Agg.	Team 2	1st leg	2nd leg
Ulaanbaatar University	4–3	Khoromkhon	2–3	2–0
Khulguud	2–2 (a)	FC Ulaanbaatar	0–1	2–1

=== Final ===
Ulaanbaatar University	0–1 (a.e.t.)	FC Ulaanbaatar

== Super Cup ==
The 2011 Super Cup was played on 1 October 2011 between the league champion FC Ulaanbaatar and the cup winner Erchim. The winner would qualify for the 2012 AFC President's Cup.

Erchim won 2–1 and became the first Mongolian representative in the AFC President's Cup.
