= Uuganbat Batmönkh =

Mongolian footballer

Personal information
- Full name: Batmönkhiin Uuuganbat; Батмөнхийн Ууганбат
- Date of birth: 5 July 1997 (age 29)
- Place of birth: Mongolia
- Position: Defender

Team information
- Current team: Deren
- Number: 3

Senior career*
Years	Team	Apps	(Gls)
2018–	Deren		

International career^{‡}
2018–	Mongolia		
- * Club domestic league appearances and goals as of 16 June 2019 ‡ National team caps and goals as of 16 June 2019

Batmönkhiin Uuuganbat (Mongolian: Батмөнхийн Ууганбат; born 5 July 1997) is a Mongolian footballer who plays as a defender for Mongolian Premier League club Deren and the Mongolian national team.
