= Hunters FC Mongolia =

Football club in Ulaanbaatar, Mongolia

Hunters FC Mongolia Хантерс ФК Монгол
- Full name: Hunters Football Club Mongolia
- Nickname: The Hunters
- Ground: MFF Football Centre, Ulaanbaatar
- Capacity: 5,000
- Owner: Kim Dong-geun
- President: Choi Do-kwon
- Manager: Mo Jeung-Il
- League: Mongolian Premier League
- 2025–26: 5th
- Website: Website
Home colours	Away colours

Hunters FC Mongolia (Mongolian: Хантерс ФК Монгол), or simply Hunters FC, is a Mongolian professional association football club from Ulaanbaatar that currently competes in the Mongolian Premier League.

== History ==
Hunters FC was established in 2019 and has been competing in the Mongolian league system since that time. Prior to the 2022/23 season, the club was purchased by Dong-geun Kim of South Korea and was placed under the Mongolia Korea Economy Support Conference umbrella. The group purchased the club for the purpose of Christian evangelization in Mongolia.

The club won the 2022/2023 Second League with an undefeated season and were automatically promoted for the following campaign. The club then finished its first season in the First League undefeated, earning its second consecutive promotion and qualifying to compete in the Mongolia Premier League for the first time for the 2024/2025 season. Hunters FC played its first-ever top flight match on 17 August 2024, losing 0–3 to Deren FC. The defeat was the club's first loss in a league fixture since 2022. Hunters FC finished in fifth place for the 2025–26 season, the club's best-ever finish in the top flight. That season, the offense was led by Min Ki-tae who tallied twenty four goals and eleven assists and was the league's top scorer. In the process, Ki-tae became the first Hunters FC player and the first player from South Korea to win the award.

== Domestic history ==
Key

Champion Runners-up 3rd Place

Season	League							Domestic Cup	Notes
Season	Div.	Pos.	Pl.	W	D	L	P	Domestic Cup	Notes
2019	4th	8th	5	3	1	1	10		Promoted to Second League
2019	3rd	7th	8	2	3	3			Relegated to National Amateur Cup
2020	4th	2nd	7	6	0	1	18		Promoted to Second League
2020	3rd								Promoted to First League
2021	2nd	4th	9	5	2	2	17		
2021/2022	2nd	9th	17	5	5	7	20		Relegated to Second League
2022/2023	3rd	1st	18	15	3	0	48		Promoted to First League
2023/2024	2nd	1st	18	15	3	0	48		Promoted to Premier League
2024/2025	1st	7th	27	8	5	14	29		
2025/2026	1st	5th	20	11	3	6	36		
2026	1st								
