= Saikhanchuluun Amarbayasgalan =

Mongolian footballer

Saikhanchuluun Amarbaysgalan
Personal information
- Full name: Amarbaysgalangiin Saikhanchuluun; Амарбаясгалангийн Сайханчулуун
- Date of birth: 28 August 1996 (age 30)
- Place of birth: Mongolia
- Height: 1.80 m (5 ft 11 in)
- Position: Goalkeeper

Team information
- Current team: Khovd
- Number: 1

Senior career*
Years	Team	Apps	(Gls)
2009–2017	Khangarid		
2017–2019	Ulaanbaatar City		
2019–	Khovd		

International career^{‡}
2017–	Mongolia	7	(0)
- * Club domestic league appearances and goals as of 22:20, 7 November 2017 (UTC) ‡ National team caps and goals as of 22:20, 30 March 2021 (UTC)

Amarbayasgalangiin Saikhanchuluun (Mongolian: Амарбаясгалангийн Сайханчулуун; born 28 August 1996) is a Mongolian footballer who plays as goalkeeper for Mongolian Premier League club Khovd and the Mongolian national team.

== Club career ==
Amarbayasgalan played for Khangarid FC of the Mongolian Premier League from 2009 through the 2017 season. During his final year with the club, he was ranked seventh among goalkeepers in the league with a 72.9 save percentage. On 7 November 2017 it was announced that he was transferred to fellow-Premier League club Ulaanbaatar City FC on a 3–year, 9 million MNT deal. There was a transfer fee of 2 million MNT.

== International career ==
Amarbayasgalan made his senior international debut on 5 October 2017 in a 2–4 friendly defeat to Chinese Taipei. He previously represented Mongolia at the under-23 level in 2018 AFC U-23 Championship qualification.

=== International career statistics ===
As of match played 5 October 2017

Mongolia national team
Year	Apps	Goals
2017	1	0
2018	4	0
2019	2	0
Total	7	0
