= Dölgöön Amaraa =

Mongolian footballer

Personal information
- Full name: Amaraagiin Dölgöön; Амараагийн Дөлгөөн
- Date of birth: 20 February 2001 (age 25)
- Place of birth: Mongolia
- Height: 1.89 m (6 ft 2 in)
- Position: Defender

Team information
- Current team: Deren
- Number: 22

Youth career
- 2017–2018: Puskás Akadémia

Senior career*
Years	Team	Apps	(Gls)
2018–	Deren		

International career^{‡}
2019–	Mongolia	20	(2)
- * Club domestic league appearances and goals ‡ National team caps and goals as of 10 September 2024

Amaraagiin Dölgöön (Mongolian: Амараагийн Дөлгөөн; born 20 February 2001) is a Mongolian footballer who plays as a defender for Mongolian Premier League club Deren and the Mongolian national team. He made his first appearance for the Mongolia national football team in 2019.

== Career statistics ==
=== Club ===
As of 29 May 2023.

Club	Season	League			National Cup		League Cup		Other		Total	
Club	Season	Division	Apps	Goals	Apps	Goals	Apps	Goals	Apps	Goals	Apps	Goals
Deren FC	2022–23	National Premier League	20	14	0	0	0	0	0	0	20	14
Career total			20	14	0	0	0	0	0	0	20	14

=== International ===
As of match played 10 September 2024

Appearances and goals by national team and year
National team	Year	Apps	Goals
Mongolia	2019	7	1
Mongolia	2020	0	0
Mongolia	2021	3	0
Mongolia	2022	0	0
Mongolia	2023	4	0
Mongolia	2024	6	1
Total		20	2

=== International goals ===
Scores and results list Mongolia's goal tally first.

No.	Date	Venue	Opponent	Score	Result	Competition
1.	5 September 2019	MFF Football Centre, Ulaanbaatar, Mongolia	Myanmar	1–0	1–0	2022 FIFA World Cup qualification
2.	10 September 2024	MFF Football Centre, Ulaanbaatar, Mongolia	Timor-Leste	2–0	2–0	2027 Asian Cup qualification
