= Otgonbayar Oyunbaatar =

Mongolian footballer

Personal information
- Full name: Otgonbayar Oyunbaatar; Оюунбаатар Отгонбаяр
- Date of birth: 9 April 1993 (age 33)
- Place of birth: Mongolia
- Position: Defender

Team information
- Current team: Ulaanbaatar City

Senior career*
| Years | Team | Apps | (Gls) |
| –2016 | Khoromkhon | | |
| 2017– | Ulaanbaatar City | | |

International career^{‡}
| 2016– | Mongolia | 11 | (0) |
- * Club domestic league appearances and goals as of 19:50, 3 November 2017 (UTC) ‡ National team caps and goals as of 19:50, 10 June 2021 (UTC)

Otgonbayar Oyunbaatar (Mongolian: Оюунбаатар Отгонбаяр; born 9 April 1993) is a Mongolian footballer who plays for Ulaanbaatar City FC of the Mongolian Premier League, and the Mongolian national team.

== Club career ==
Oyunbaatar has played for Khoromkhon FC of the Mongolian Premier League. In 2015 he was part of Khoromkhon's squad for the 2016 AFC Cup qualifying round, taking part in the team's matches against K-Electric F.C. of Pakistan and Druk United of Bhutan. In 2016 he was named the league's best defender. He joined fellow Premier League club Ulaanbaatar City FC for the 2017 season. Following the season, he signed a 5-year contract extension with the club worth 10 million MNT plus living expenses per season.

== International career ==
Oyunbaatar made his senior international debut on 30 June 2016 in a 2017 EAFF E-1 Football Championship match against Macau.

=== International career statistics ===
As of match played 5 October 2017

Mongolia national team
| Year | Apps | Goals |
|---|---|---|
| 2016 | 5 | 0 |
| 2017 | 1 | 0 |
| Total | 6 | 0 |
