= FC Ulaanbaatar =

Association football club in Mongolia

Ulaanbaatar
- Full name: Football Club Ulaanbaatar
- Nickname: The Red Knights
- Short name: FCUB
- Founded: 2010; 16 years ago
- Ground: MFF Football Centre
- Capacity: 5,000
- Manager: Bekhbatyn Ganbat
- League: Mongolian Premier League
- 2026: 1st, Champions
Home colours	Away colours

FC Ulaanbaatar (Mongolian: ФС Улаанбаатар) is a professional football club based in Ulaanbaatar, Mongolia. The club currently competes in the Mongolian Premier League. It is a two-time champion of the league since its founding in 2010.

== History ==
FC Ulaanbaatar was founded in 2010. They participated in the Mongolia Premier League for the first time the following season. That year, the club defeated Ulaanbaatar DS 1–0 in the championship final to win the title. Over the next decade, the club finished as runners-up in 2015, 2018, 2020 and 2021–22 before capturing their second title after twelve years in 2022–23 under head coach Vojislav Bralušić. That year, the club also won the MFF Cup for the first time to complete the double.

=== AFC Cup debut ===
By virtue of their league championship in 2022–23, FC Ulaanbaatar earned the right to participate in continental competition for the first time. The team entered the 2023–24 AFC Cup and were placed into Group I with Macau's Chao Pak Kei and Taiwan Steel and Taichung Futuro of Taiwan. FC Ulaanbaatar won its first match in the competition, a 3 –1 victory over Taiwan Steel on 21 September 2023. With the win, FC Ulaanbaatar became the first Mongolian club to win a match in the final round of the AFC Cup. Ultimately, the club would fail to advance to the next round, being edged out by Taichung Futuro on goal-difference with both clubs sitting at twelve points.

== Domestic history ==
Key

Champion Runners-up 3rd Place

Season	League									Federation Cup
Season	Div.	Pos.	Pl.	W	D	L	GS	GA	P	Federation Cup
2011	1st	1	14	6	3	5	35	24	21	
2012	1st	6	12	4	0	8	17	32	12	Semi-final
2013	1st	3	12	5	2	5	21	23	17	
2014	1st	5	12	4	1	7	25	22	13	
2015	1st	2	16	11	0	5	40	24	33	Runners-up
2016	1st	6	18	6	5	7	33	41	23	Round of 16
2017	1st	8	18	5	2	11	26	31	17	Runners-up
2018	1st	2	18	10	7	1	41	17	37	Round of 16
2019	1st	7	22	8	5	9	47	37	29	Round of 16
2020	1st	2	18	12	2	4	56	22	38	
2021	1st	4	18	9	6	3	34	16	33	
2021–22	1st	2	18	13	2	3	56	18	38	
2022–23	1st	1	24	21	2	1	93	108	62	Winner
2023–24	1st	4	27	15	1	11	70	40	46	Semi-final
2024–25	1st	3	27	15	6	6	65	40	51	
2025–26	1st	1	23	17	3	3	82	20	54	
2026	1st	1	12	11	1	0	53	7	34	

== Continental record ==
Scores list FC Ulaanbaatar’s goal tally first.

Season	Competition	Round	Club	Home	Away	Aggregate
2023	AFC Cup	Group I				
2023	AFC Cup	Group I	(Chinese Taipei) Taiwan Steel	3–1	0–3	3–4
2023	AFC Cup	Group I	(Macau) Chao Pak Kei	1–0	1–0	2–0
2023	AFC Cup	Group I	(Chinese Taipei) Taichung Futuro	0–2	2–1	2–3
2026–27	AFC Challenge League	Preliminary Stage	(Chinese Taipei) Hang Yuan	1–2		
2027–28	AFC Challenge League	Preliminary Stage				

== Players ==
=== Current squad ===
As of 1 September 2023

Note: Flags indicate national team as defined under FIFA eligibility rules; some limited exceptions apply. Players may hold more than one non-FIFA nationality.

No.	Pos.	Nation	Player
1	GK	MGL	Mönkh-Erdene Enkhtaivan
3	DF	MGL	Turbat Daginaa
4	DF	MGL	Bat-Orgil Gerelt-Od
5	MF	MGL	Ganduulga Ganbaatar
6	DF	MGL	Amgalanbat Batbaatar
7	FW	UZB	Sardorbek Matmuratov
8	MF	MGL	Uuganbayar Purevsuren
9	FW	MGL	Oyunbaatar Mijiddorj
10	FW	MGL	Baljinnyam Batbold
11	MF	UZB	Islom Shodmonov
12	DF	MGL	Oyunbaatar Otgonbayar

No.	Pos.	Nation	Player
14	FW	PAK	Khan Fareed
17	MF	MGL	Gantogtokh Gantuya
18	DF	MGL	Munkh-Erdene Lkhagvasuren
19	DF	MGL	Tsogt-Ochir Jargaltuya
22	MF	UZB	Sanadyov Ali
23	MF	MGL	Dulguun Amaraa
24	MF	MGL	Unur-Erdene Erdenechimeg
26	MF	MGL	Temuujin Altansukh
28	DF	IRI	Omid Yahassan
29	GK	MGL	Munkhsuld Battseren
30	GK	MGL	Chuluunbor Sengetsamba

== Managerial history ==
Name	Nat.	Tenure	Ref.
Battulga Nasan-Ulzii	Mongolia	2011–2013	
Jun Fukuda	Japan	2014–2017	
Marco Ragini	San Marino	2018–2019	
Bekhbatyn Ganbat	Mongolia	2019–2020	
Vojislav Bralušić	Serbia	2022 – April 2024	
Andreas Spier	Germany	August 2024 – June 2025	
Bekhbatyn Ganbat	Mongolia	June 2025 – Present	

== Honours ==
- Mongolian Premier League
  - Winners (4): 2011, 2022/2023, 2025/2026, 2026
  - Runners-up (4): 2015, 2018, 2020, 2022
- MFF Super Cup
  - Winners (2): 2020, 2023
  - Runners-up (3): 2011, 2015, 2022
- MFF Cup
  - Winners (1): 2023
  - Runners-up (2): 2015, 2017
