= Mönkh-Erdene Tsagaantsooj =

Mongolian footballer

Personal information
- Full name: Tsagaantsoojiin Mönkh-Erdene; Цагаанцоожийн Мөнх-Эрдэнэ
- Date of birth: 16 July 1992 (age 34)
- Place of birth: Mongolia
- Position: Midfielder

Team information
- Current team: Ulaanbaatar

Senior career*
Years	Team	Apps	(Gls)
2011–2017	Khangarid		
2017–	Ulaanbaatar		

International career^{‡}
2011–	Mongolia	20	(2)
- * Club domestic league appearances and goals ‡ National team caps and goals as of 16 July 2026

Tsagaantsoojiin Mönkh-Erdene (Mongolian: Цагаанцоожийн Мөнх-Эрдэнэ; born 16 July 1992) is a Mongolian footballer who plays as a midfielder for Mongolian Premier League club Ulaanbaatar and the Mongolian national team. He made his first appearance for the Mongolia national football team in 2011.

== Career statistics ==
=== International ===
Appearances and goals by national team and year
National team	Year	Apps	Goals
Mongolia	2011	2	0
Mongolia	2012	–	
Mongolia	2013	3	0
Mongolia	2014	–	
Mongolia	2015	–	
Mongolia	2016	2	0
Mongolia	2017	1	1
Mongolia	2018	9	1
Mongolia	2019	1	0
Mongolia	2020	–	
Mongolia	2021	–	
Mongolia	2022	2	0
Total		20	2

Scores and results list Mongolia'a goal tally first, score column indicates score after each Tsagaantsooj goal.

List of international goals scored by Mönkh-Erdene Tsagaantsooj
No.	Date	Venue	Opponent	Score	Result	Competition
1	5 October 2017	Taipei Municipal Stadium, Taipei, Taiwan	Chinese Taipei	1–0	2–4	Friendly
2	16 October 2018	New Laos National Stadium, Vientiane, Laos	Laos	1–0	4–1	Friendly
