= Tsedenbalyn Tümenjargal =

Mongolian footballer

Personal information
- Full name: Tsedenbalyn Tümenjargal; Цэдэнбалын Түмэнжаргал
- Date of birth: 24 February 1989 (age 37)
- Place of birth: Mongolia
- Position: Midfielder

Team information
- Current team: Brera Ilch

Senior career*
Years	Team	Apps	(Gls)
2008–2014	Ulaanbaatar University	12	(21)
2015–2016	Unaganuud	15	(18)
2017–2019	Ulaanbaatar City	14	(10)
2020–2022	Erchim	32	(31)
2022–2024	Tuv Azarganuud	47	(50)
2024	Brera Ilch	1	(0)
2024	Tuv Azarganuud	5	(6)
2024–	Brera Ilch		

International career
2009–2018	Mongolia	8	(1)
- * Club domestic league appearances and goals

Tsedenbalyn Tümenjargal (Mongolian: Цэдэнбалын Түмэнжаргал; born 24 February 1989) is a Mongolian professional footballer who plays for Mongolian Premier League club Brera Ilch.

== International career ==
He has appeared 4 times for the Mongolia national football team in 2011 and was selected as a squad member for the 2014 AFC Challenge Cup qualifiers, during which he scored in the match against Laos.

== International goals ==
Scores and results list the Mongolia's goal tally first.

#	Date	Venue	Opponent	Score	Result	Competition
1.	March 2, 2013	New Laos National Stadium, Vientiane	Laos	1–0	1–1	2014 AFC Challenge Cup qualification
