= Baljinnyam Batbold =

Mongolian footballer

Personal information
- Full name: Batboldyn Baljinnyam; Батболдын Балжинням
- Date of birth: 8 November 1999 (age 26)
- Place of birth: Darvi, Govi-Altai, Mongolia
- Position: Winger

Team information
- Current team: Ulaanbaatar
- Number: 10

Youth career
- Khoromkhon

Senior career*
Years	Team	Apps	(Gls)
2011–2018	Khoromkhon		
2018–	Ulaanbaatar		

International career^{‡}
2018–	Mongolia	25	(4)
- * Club domestic league appearances and goals as of 20:49, 7 September 2018 (UTC) ‡ National team caps and goals as of 16:29, 25 March 2023 (UTC)

Batboldyn Baljinnyam (Mongolian: Батболдын Балжинням; born 8 November 1999) is a Mongolian footballer who plays as a winger for Mongolian Premier League club FC Ulaanbaatar and the Mongolia national team.

== Club career ==
Baljinnyam was signed by Khoromkhon FC of the Mongolian Premier League in 2011. He remained with the team until 2017 when it was relegated to the Mongolian 1st League. He then signed a 3-year contract with FC Ulaanbaatar.

In 2012, Batbold participated in junior camps held by Italian Serie A club AC Milan in the Mongolian capital of Ulaanbaatar. He was one of four players out of over 200 who were invited to participate in the final youth tournament in Milan.

== International career ==
Baljinnyam made his senior international debut on 22 March 2018 in a friendly against Malaysia. He was later named to Mongolia's squad for the First Preliminary Round of the 2019 EAFF E-1 Football Championship. He appeared in all three of the team's matches, scoring three goals and winning the round's Golden Boot award as top goalscorer.

=== International goals ===
Score and result list Mongolia's goal tally first.

#	Date	Venue	Opponent	Score	Result	Competition
1	2 September 2018	MFF Football Centre, Ulaanbaatar, Mongolia	Macau	3–1	4–1	2019 EAFF E-1 Football Championship qualification
2	4 September 2018	MFF Football Centre, Ulaanbaatar, Mongolia	Northern Mariana Islands	6–0	9–0	2019 EAFF E-1 Football Championship qualification
3	4 September 2018	MFF Football Centre, Ulaanbaatar, Mongolia	Northern Mariana Islands	7–0	9–0	2019 EAFF E-1 Football Championship qualification
4	25 March 2023	Adjarabet Arena, Batumi, Georgia	Georgia	1–1	1–6	Friendly
Last updated 25 March 2023

=== International career statistics ===
As of match played 25 March 2023

Mongolia national team
Year	Apps	Goals
2018	9	3
2019	2	0
2023	1	1
Total	12	4
