= MFF Super Cup =

Annual association football match in Mongolia

- Founded: 2011
- Region: Mongolia
- Teams: 2
- Current champions: Selenge Press Falcons (1st title)
- Most championships: Khaan Khuns-Erchim (9 titles)

Mongolia Super Cup is an annual football match in Mongolia, played between the winners of the Mongolia Premier League and the MFF Cup.

== List of finals ==
- 2011: Erchim 2–1 Ulaanbaatar
- 2012: Erchim 7–2 Khasiin Khulguud
- 2013: Erchim 2–1 Khangarid
- 2014: Erchim 1–0 Khoromkhon
- 2015: Erchim 6–0 Ulaanbaatar
- 2016: Erchim 5–1 Khangarid
- 2017: Ulaanbaatar City 4–2 Erchim
- 2018: Erchim 4–2 Athletic 220
- 2019: Erchim 4–0 Ulaanbaatar City
- 2020: Ulaanbaatar 2–0 Athletic 220
- 2021: Deren 2–0 Athletic 220
- 2022: Erchim 1–1 (3–2 pen.) Ulaanbaatar
- 2023: Deren 2–1 Ulaanbaatar
- 2024: Selenge Press Falcons 3–1 Khangarid

== Titles per club ==
| Club | Champion | Years won |
|---|---|---|
| Khaan Khuns-Erchim (Ulaanbaatar) | 9 | 2011, 2012, 2013, 2014, 2015, 2016, 2018, 2019, 2022 |
| Deren (Ulaanbaatar) | 2 | 2021, 2023 |
| Ulaanbaatar City (Ulaanbaatar) | 1 | 2017 |
| Ulaanbaatar (Ulaanbaatar) | 1 | 2020 |
| Selenge Press Falcons (Ulaanbaatar) | 1 | 2024 |
