= Ken Murayama =

Japanese footballer

Personal information
- Date of birth: 18 July 1998 (age 28)
- Place of birth: Japan
- Height: 1.74 m (5 ft 8 1/2 in)
- Position: Winger

Team information
- Current team: Dynamic Herb Cebu
- Number: 92

Youth career
- –2014: Vissel Kobe
- 2015–2017: Kobe Koryo Gakuen High School

College career
Years	Team	Apps	(Gls)
2018–2021	Tokoha University		

Senior career*
Years	Team	Apps	(Gls)
2021	Atlètic Sant Just		
2021–2022	UE Sabadell Nord		
2022	Athletic 200		
2022–2023	Khovd		
2023	Neptūnas		
2023–	Dynamic Herb Cebu		
- * Club domestic league appearances and goals

Ken Murayama (村山 健, Murayama Ken; born 18 July 1998) is a Japanese professional footballer who plays as a winger for Philippines Football League club Dynamic Herb Cebu.

== Club career ==
=== Youth and college career ===
Murayama played high school football for Kobe Koryo Gakuen High School, and was also a member of the U15 team of J1 League club Vissel Kobe. After graduating high school, he played college football for the Hamamatsu Campus of Tohoku University, graduating in 2021.

=== Spain ===
After graduating from university, Murayama played amateur football in the lower divisions of Spain, first with Atlètic Sant Just. Just two months later, he transferred to another Spanish club, UE Sabadell Nord.

=== Mongolia ===
In January 2022 it was announced that Athletic 220 of the Mongolian National Premier League had signed Murayama as a foreign recruitment. Having won the league the previous year, Athletic qualified for the qualifying rounds of the 2022 AFC Cup. They lost in the play-offs to Lee Man, with Murayama scoring the first goal in the home leg. In the summer of 2022, Murayama, along with a host of other players, left Athletic to sign for fellow league side Khovd.

=== Lithuania ===
After his stint in Mongolia, Murayama signed for Neptūnas in the I Lyga, the second tier of Lithuanian football.

=== Cebu ===
On July 13, it was announced that Murayama had signed for Dynamic Herb Cebu of the Philippines Football League as part of the club's preparations for the upcoming editions of the Copa Paulino Alcantara and AFC Cup.
