= Mark Paul Deren =

American artist

Mark Paul Deren (born June 23, 1980), more commonly known as MADSTEEZ, is an artist and designer based in California. He held a solo exhibition in New York City. In 2005, Deren was featured in The New York Times.

In 2020 the artist dressed up Fairfax, Virginia with new murals. WEENsville is a seven-part series and it features his human-animal hybrids called Ween!mals.
