= Van Deren =

Van Deren is both a surname and a given name. Notable people with the name include:

- Diane Van Deren (born 1960), American ultra-runner
- Van Deren Coke (1921–2004), American photographer and museum director

== See also ==
- Van Dieren (surname)
