= Hiroya Kiyomoto =

Japanese footballer

Personal information
- Date of birth: 12 August 1996 (age 30)
- Place of birth: Kanagawa, Japan
- Height: 1.68 m (5 ft 6 in)
- Position: Midfielder

Team information
- Current team: FK Šilas

Youth career
- FC Imajuku
- –2015: Shonan Bellmare
- 2015–2018: Chukyo University

Senior career*
Years	Team	Apps	(Gls)
2019	Igalo 1929	15	(0)
2019–2020	Zlatibor Čajetina	1	(0)
2020	Arsenal Tivat	3	(0)
2022-	FK Šilas	0	(0)
- * Club domestic league appearances and goals as of 14:24, 12 March 2022 (UTC)

Hiroya Kiyomoto (清本 宙矢, Kiyomoto Hiroya; born 12 August 1996) is a Japanese footballer currently playing as a midfielder for Lithuanian side FK Šilas.

== Career statistics ==
=== Club ===
As of 10 November 2020.

Club	Season	League			Cup		Other		Total	
Club	Season	Division	Apps	Goals	Apps	Goals	Apps	Goals	Apps	Goals
Igalo 1929	2018–19	Druga CFL	15	0	0	0	0	0	15	0
Zlatibor Čajetina	2019–20	Serbian First League	1	0	0	0	0	0	1	0
Career total			16	0	0	0	0	0	16	0
