= Bekhbatyn Ganbat =

Mongolian footballer (born 1988)

Personal information
- Full name: Bekhbatyn Ganbat; Бэхбатын Ганбат
- Date of birth: April 20, 1988 (age 38)
- Place of birth: Sükhbaatar, Mongolia
- Position: Defender

Team information
- Current team: Ulaanbaatar University

Senior career*
Years	Team	Apps	(Gls)
2011–	Ulaanbaatar University		

International career
2011–	Mongolia	1	(0)
- * Club domestic league appearances and goals

Bekhbatyn Ganbat (Mongolian: Бэхбатын Ганбат; born 20 April 1988) is a Mongolian international footballer. He made his first appearance for the Mongolia national football team in 2011.
