= Taiyo Toyoda =

Japanese footballer

Personal information
- Date of birth: 22 December 2000 (age 25)
- Place of birth: Japan
- Position: Centre-back

Team information
- Current team: Kaya–Iloilo
- Number: 2

Youth career
- FC Fresca Kobe
- Vissel Kobe
- Kobe Koryo High School

College career
Years	Team	Apps	(Gls)
–2023	Biwako Seikei Sport College		

Senior career*
Years	Team	Apps	(Gls)
2023	NK Stubica	13	(0)
2023–2024	SP Falcons		
2024	BFB Pattaya City		
2024–2026	SP Falcons		
2026–	Kaya–Iloilo	10	(0)
- * Club domestic league appearances and goals as of April 23, 2026 (UTC)

Taiyo Toyoda (豊田 大陽, Toyoda Taiyo; born 22 December 2000) is a Japanese professional footballer who plays as a centre-back for Philippines Football League club Kaya–Iloilo.

== Career ==
=== Youth career ===
Toyoda was born in Japan, and played youth football mainly around the city of Kobe and Hyogo Prefecture. He played youth football for Fresca Kobe, as well as one of the youth teams of J League side Vissel Kobe, Vissel Kobe Itami. In high school, he played football for the team of Kobe Koryo High School, and scored a goal against Kindai Wakayama High School.

In university he played for Biwako Seikei Sport College in Shiga Prefecture. graduating in 2023. At Biwako Seikei, he and the team reached the semifinals of the collegiate Minister's Cup for the first time.

=== Professional career ===
After graduating from Biwako Seikei, Toyoda signed his first professional contract with Croatian side NK Stubica. In his half season with the club, he made 13 appearances before departing in mid-2023. After that, he joined SP Falcons of Mongolia as a foreign reinforcement in the Mongolian Premier League. He also featured heavily for the side in continental competition, featuring in the AFC Challenge League.

In late 2023, Toyoda left Falcons to move to Thailand, where he served once again as a foreign reinforcement for Thai League 3 side Pattaya City in the second round of the league. At the season's end, he departed the club and returned to SP Falcons, where he stayed for another season, competing once more in the AFC Challenge League against Svay Rieng, Manila Digger, and Ezra FC.

=== Philippines ===
In January 2026, it was announced that Toyoda had signed a contract with another club, this time with Kaya–Iloilo of the Philippines Football League. He made his debut a month later in February, in a dominant win over Don Bosco Garelli United.
