= Khuree Khovguud FC =

Association football club in Mongolia

Khuree Khovguud Хүрээ Хөвгүүд
- Founded: 2015
- Ground: MFF Football Centre; Ulaanbaatar
- Capacity: 5000
- League: Mongolia First League
- 2019: 10th (Relegated)
- Website: https://www.facebook.com/Khuree-Khuwguud-FC-361830197720554

Khuree Khovguud Football Club (Mongolian: Хүрээ Хөвгүүд, English: Monastery Boys) is a Mongolian association football club that last competed in the First League.

== Domestic history ==
Key

Champion Runners-up 3rd Place

Season	League							Domestic Cup	Notes
Season	Div.	Pos.	Pl.	W	D	L	P	Domestic Cup	Notes
2018	2nd	10th	10	1	1	8	4		
2019	2nd	10th	18	1	2	15	5		Relegated to Second League
