= Ryo Kato (footballer) =

Japanese footballer

Personal information
- Date of birth: 20 August 1991 (age 35)
- Place of birth: Japan
- Positions: Defender; midfielder

Team information
- Current team: Prey Veng
- Number: 5

Youth career
- Yamanashi Gakuin High School

College career
Years	Team	Apps	(Gls)
- Yamanashi Gakuin University

Senior career*
Years	Team	Apps	(Gls)
–2012	Fontana Finthen		
2012–2014	Rot-Weiß Darmstadt	55	(3)
2014–2015	Sportfreunde Siegen	14	(1)
2014–2015	→ Sportfreunde Siegen II (loan)	5	(0)
2016	Titograd	2	(0)
2016	SV Gonsenheim	7	(0)
2017	Kamza	4	(0)
2018–2020	Basara Mainz	28	(2)
2023–2024	Prey Veng	23	(0)
- * Club domestic league appearances and goals

Ryo Kato (Japanese: 加藤亮; born 20 August 1991) is a Japanese footballer who plays as a defender or midfielder for Prey Veng in the Cambodian Premier League.

== Career ==
In 2014, Kato signed for German fifth division side Sportfreunde Siegen from Fontana Finthen in the German sixth division.

Before the second half of 2015/16, he signed for Montenegrin club Titograd, helping them win the league.

Before the second half of 2016/17, he signed for Kamza in the Albanian second division.

In 2018, Kato signed for German fifth division team Basara Mainz.
