= Central Stallions FC =

Association football club in Mongolia

- Full name: Central Stallions Football Club
- Founded: 2018; 8 years ago
- Ground: MFF Football Centre
- Capacity: 5,000
- Head Coach: Bayasgalangiin Garidmagnai
- League: Mongolian Premier League
- 2025–26: Mongolian Premier League, 2nd of 9
Home colours	Away colours

Central Stallions FC is a Mongolian professional football club from Töv Province that currently competes in the Mongolian Premier League.

== History ==
The club was founded as Tuv Buganuud FC in 2018 with the support of the local government of Töv Province. It was promoted to the Mongolia Premier League for the first time for the 2021–22. They earned promotion by finishing runner-up in the Mongolian First League in 2021 then defeating Khoromkhon FC in a play-off series.

The club rebranded as Tuv Azarganuud during the 2023–24 season. The following season saw the club without a single point from nine matches during the first half of campaign. The club defied the odds during the second half of the season and leapfrogged Brera Ilch FC to qualify for a promotion/relegation play-off with Ulaangom City FC. Central Stallions maintained its place in the top division with a comfortable victory in the play-off series.

Ahead of the 2025–26 season, the club again rebranded, this time as Central Stallions FC, the English translation of its name. The club also had a major roster overhaul, bringing in several Mongolian internationals and Bayasgalangiin Garidmagnai as head coach. The Stallions entered the winter break undefeated and at the top of the league table.

== Domestic history ==
Key

Champion Runners-up Third place

Season	League							Domestic cup	Notes	Ref.
Season	Div.	Pos.	Pl.	W	D	L	P	Domestic cup	Notes	Ref.
2019	2nd	8th	18	4	5	9	17	DNQ		
2020	2nd	4th	18	10	4	4	34	DNQ		
2021	2nd	2nd	9	7	1	1	22	Not held	Promoted to Mongolian Premier League	
2021–22	1st	5th	18	9	3	6	30	Not held		
2022–23	1st	5th	24	12	0	12	30	Round 1		
2023–24	1st	5th	27	14	3	10	45	Round 2		
2024–25	1st	9th	25	5	1	'9	16	Not held		
2025–26	1st	2nd	23	14	5	4	47			

== Continental record ==
Scores list Central Stallions FC’s goal tally first.

Season	Competition	Round	Opponent	Home	Away	Aggregate
2026–27	AFC Challenge League	Preliminary Stage	(Chinese Taipei) Tainan City	2–2 (a.e.t.) (3–5 p)		

== Current squad ==
As of 1 September 2023

Note: Flags indicate national team as defined under FIFA eligibility rules; some limited exceptions apply. Players may hold more than one non-FIFA nationality.

No.	Pos.	Nation	Player
1	GK	MGL	Saikhanchuluun Amarbayasgalan
99	GK	MGL	Tsendjav Dagvasuren
21	GK	MGL	Khuslen Bayartulga
20	DF	MGL	Dulguun Gankhuyag
13	DF	MGL	Odbayar Baasandorj
3	DF	MGL	Temuujin Volodya
6	DF	MGL	Munkhtsenguun Orkhon
93	MF	IRI	Behnam Habibi
19	DF	MGL	Bilguun Ganbold
98	DF	BRA	Marcelo Juhnior
4	DF	MGL	Taivankhuu Khurelbaatar
5	DF	MGL	Erdembileg Amarzaya
23	DF	MGL	Enkh-Orgil Otgonbaatar
27	DF	MGL	Bat-Erdene Chinzorig
7	MF	MGL	Saruultugs Batbayar
33	MF	MGL	Suld-Erdene Baatarsukh
12	MF	MGL	Ulzii-Od Baatar
9	MF	MGL	Yondonjamts Gerelbayar
15	MF	MGL	Khuslen Otgonkhuyag
11	MF	BRA	Lucas De Carvalho Serra
30	MF	MGL	Tuguldur Munkh-Erdene
8	MF	MGL	Enkhbileg Purevdorj
14	MF	MGL	Otgontsagaan Saikhanbayar
10	FW	MGL	Tumenjargal Tsedenbal
88	FW	JPN	Tetsuaki Misawa
16	FW	JPN	Tatsuya Nishio
17	FW	MGL	Lkhagvabayar Batjargal
