= SP Falcons =

Association football club in Mongolia

- Full name: Selenge Press Falcons
- Nickname: The Falcons
- Founded: 2003; 23 years ago
- Ground: MFF Football Centre
- Capacity: 5,000
- Owner: Amartuvshin Bold
- League: Mongolian Premier League
- 2025–26: Mongolian Premier League, withdrew
Home colours	Away colours

Selenge Press Falcons, simply known as SP Falcons (formerly Bulgan SP Falcons for sponsorship reasons) is a Mongolian professional football club which last competed in the Mongolian Premier League.

== History ==
In 2024, SP Falcons qualified to their first ever AFC competitions, the 2024–25 AFC Challenge League after winning the 2023–24 Mongolian Premier League title. The club was drawn in the group E alongside Madura United from Indonesia and Preah Khan Reach Svay Rieng from Cambodia, where SP Falcons hosted the group. The club managed to get 1 point after a goalless draw with Preah Khan Reach Svay Rieng, but fell to a 2–1 defeat to Madura United.

== Stadium ==
The team plays their home games at the MFF Football Centre, which has a capacity of 5,000 spectators.

== Players (2025) ==
Note: Flags indicate national team as defined under FIFA eligibility rules; some limited exceptions apply. Players may hold more than one non-FIFA nationality.

No.	Pos.	Nation	Player
1	GK	MGL	Erdenesukh Erdenebat
2	DF	JPN	Taiyo Toyoda
3	DF	BRA	Thiago Tomias
4	DF	MGL	Sukhbat Dulguun
5	DF	MGL	Lkhagvasuren Altansukh
7	FW	MGL	Batkhishig Mygmar
8	MF	MGL	Batbold Bat-Erdene
9	MF	MGL	Jansyerik Maratkhan
10	MF	MGL	Mönkh-Erdengiin Tögöldör
11	FW	BRA	Vlademir Everton
13	MF	MGL	S. Otgontsagaan

No.	Pos.	Nation	Player
16	MF	JPN	Shoya Nagata
18	MF	BRA	Thiago Bahiense
22	MF	SRB	Nemanja Kruševac
23	MF	MGL	Enkhorgil Otgonbaatar
25	GK	MGL	Tsenguun Khandaa
70	FW	UZB	Reza Ayvazov
71	FW	RUS	Daniil Musatkin
77	MF	BRA	André Ferreira
96	DF	BRA	Almeida Silva
98	FW	MGL	N.N. Khosebayar
99	FW	MGL	Namsrai Baatartsogt

== Domestic history ==
Season	League									Mongolia Cup	Top goalscorer		Manager
Season	Div.	Pos.	Pl.	W	D	L	GS	GA	P	Mongolia Cup	Name	League	Manager
2023–24	1st	Champions	26	21	2	4	85	18	65	Champions			
2024–25	1st	Champions	25	19	4	2	99	16	61	Champions			
2025–26	1st	Withdrew	5	3	2	0	12	1	0				

== Continental record ==
Scores list SP Falcons’s goal tally first.

Season	Competition	Round	Opponent	Home	Away	Aggregate
2024–25	AFC Challenge League	Group E	(Indonesia) Madura United	0–0		
2024–25	AFC Challenge League	Group E	(Cambodia) Preah Khan Reach Svay Rieng	1–2		
2025–26	AFC Challenge League	Preliminary stage	(Chinese Taipei) Taichung Futuro	3–1		
2025–26	AFC Challenge League	Group D	(Cambodia) Preah Khan Reach Svay Rieng	0–3		
2025–26	AFC Challenge League	Group D	(Philippines) Manila Digger	0–2		
2025–26	AFC Challenge League	Group D	(Laos) Ezra	3–1		
Total
Played	Win	Draw	Loss	GF	GA	GD
6	2	1	3	7	9	-2

== Honours ==
- Mongolian Premier League
  - Winners (2): 2023–24, 2024–25
- MFF Super Cup
  - Winners (1): 2024
