= TG Sport =

Mongolian sportswear manufacturer

- Industry: Sportswear
- Headquarters: Bayanzürkh, Ulaanbaatar, Mongolia
- Website: tgsport.mn

Tod Gyalаlz Sport (Mongolian: Тод Гялалз) is a Mongolian sportswear manufacturer based in Ulaanbaatar.

== Sponsorship ==
In August 2021 it was announced that the company had signed a two-year deal with the Mongolian Football Federation to provide kits for all Mongolian national teams until june 2023.
