= Sanjmyataviin Purevsukh =

Mongolian football coach

Personal information
- Full name: Sanjmyataviin Purevsukh
- Date of birth: 17 March 1973 (age 53)
- Place of birth: Mongolia

Team information
- Current team: Khoromkhon FC (manager)

Managerial career
- Years: Team
- 2015: Mongolia
- 2015–: Khoromkhon FC

Sanjmyataviin Purevsukh (born on 17 March 1973), is a Mongolian football manager. He coached the Mongolian national team for the 2018 FIFA World Cup qualification in Russia.
