= Vojislav Bralušić =

Serbian football manager

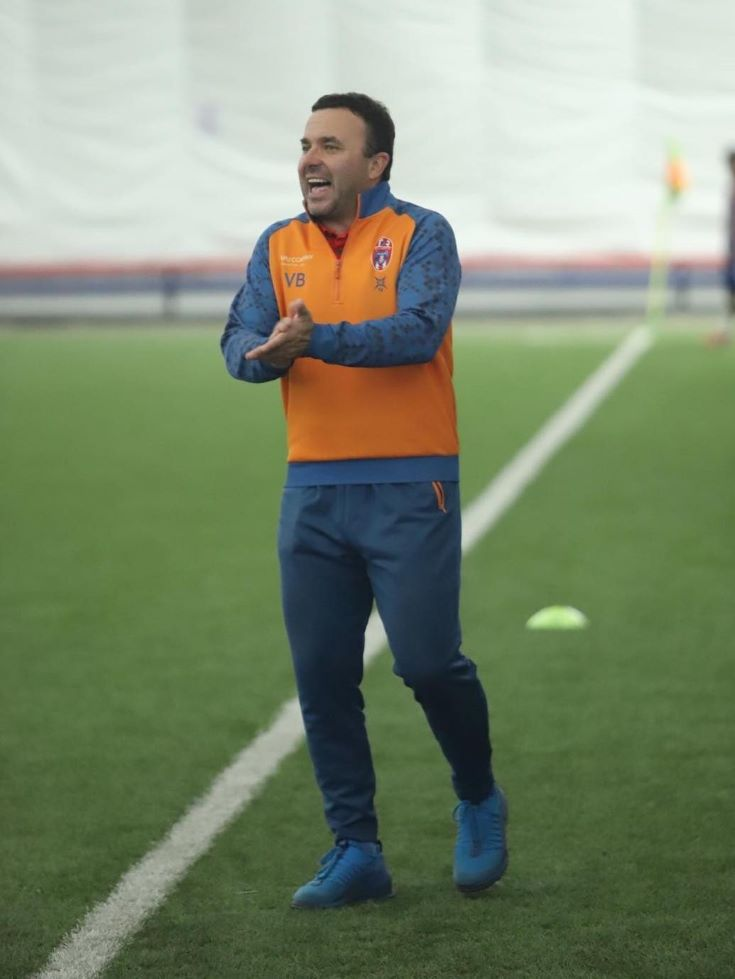
- Vojislav Bralušić

Personal information
- Full name: Vojislav Bralušić
- Date of birth: 10 September 1980 (age 46)
- Place of birth: Užice, Serbia

Managerial career
- Years: Team
- 2003–2010: Lokomotiva Beograd
- 2011: Deren Sumida
- 2012–2014: Erchim
- 2014: Mongolia
- 2015–2018: Deren
- 2015: Mongolia U16
- 2019–2020: Anduud City
- 2020: Ulaanbaatar City
- 2020: Mongolia (Interim)
- 2021–2024: FC Ulaanbaatar

Vojislav Bralušić (born 10 September 1980) is a Serbian football manager who was most recently head coach of FC Ulaanbaatar.
