= Ulaanbaataryn Unaganuud FC =

Association football club in Mongolia

Ulaanbaataryn Unaganuud
- Full name: Ulaanbaataryn Unaganuud Football Club
- Nickname: Unaganuud
- Founded: 2001; 25 years ago
- Ground: MFF Football Centre, Ulaanbaatar
- Capacity: 3,500
- Owner: Choi Gi Ho
- Manager: Erdene-Ochir S.
- League: Mongolian Premier League
- 2016: Mongolian Premier League, 4th of 10
Home colours	Away colours

Ulaanbaataryn Unaganuud Football Club is a Mongolian football club from Ulaanbaatar. They compete in the Mongolian Premier League and are also known as UBU FC (УБУ ФС). In addition to competing in the Khurkhree League, the university team have also competed in the Asian Student Championships in 2007 and 2009 as well as a friendly tournament between teams from Mongolia, China and Korea in 2005. The club also run a futsal team which is based in the university sports hall.

== Honours ==
- Mongolian Premier League
  - Champions (1): 2009
