= Khovd Western FC =

Association football club in Mongolia

Khovd Western Football Club is a Mongolian football club.

== Men's team ==
Khovd Western
- Full name: Khovd Western Football Club
- League: Mongolian Premier League
- 2025–26: 6th

The men's team competes in the Mongolian Premier League.

== Women's team ==
Khovd Western women team
- Full name: Khovd Western women team
- Ground: MFF Football Centre
- Capacity: 5,000
- League: Women's National Football League
- 2024: 1

The Khovd Western women team (Mongolian: Ховд Вэстэрн эмэгтэй хөлбөмбөгийн баг) Mongolian professional women's football club based in Ulaanbaatar. competes in the Women's National Football League, the top tier women's league in the country.

The Khovd Western women's team became champions in 2024.

=== Continental record ===
Scores list Khovd Western women’s goal tally first.

| Season | Competition | Round | Opponent | Home | Away | Aggregate |
|---|---|---|---|---|---|---|
| 2025–26 | AFC Women's Champions League | Preliminary Stage | (Philippines) Stallion Laguna | 1–6 | | |
| 2025–26 | AFC Women's Champions League | Preliminary Stage | (Myanmar) I.S.P.E | 0–8 | | |
| 2025–26 | AFC Women's Champions League | Preliminary Stage | Bank of Guam Strykers | 2–5 | | |
