= Khoromkhon FC =

Association football club in Mongolia

- Full name: Khoromkhon Football Club
- Nickname: The Yellows
- Founded: 1999; 27 years ago
- Ground: MFF Football Centre, Ulaanbaatar
- Capacity: 5,000
- Owner: Gansukh B.
- Manager: Sanjmyataviin Purevsukh
- League: Mongolian Premier League
- 2025–26: MPL, 9th of 9
Home colours	Away colours

Khoromkhon Football Club is a Mongolian professional football club from Ulaanbaatar that currently competes in the Mongolian Premier League. The club started playing under the name Heiniken in 2000, but changed its name to Khoromkhon in 2003.

== History ==
=== Domestic history ===
Season	League									Mongolia Cup	Top goalscorer		Manager
Season	Div.	Pos.	Pl.	W	D	L	GS	GA	P	Mongolia Cup	Name	League	Manager
2011	1st	4th	14	5	6	3	20	22	21				
2012	1st	2nd	12	7	3	2	25	14	24				
2013	1st	7th	12	2	2	8	23	41	8				
2014	1st	1st	12	8	4	0	27	11	28				
2015	1st	4th	16	9	2	5	50	28	29		(Mongolia) Naranbold Nyam-Osor	23	
2016	1st	3rd	18	10	2	6	42	25	32				
2017	1st	9th	18	4	3	11	20	44	15				
2018	2nd	2nd	10	9	0	1	34	2	27	Quarterfinals			
2019	1st	10th	22	2	0	20	18	110	6	Quarterfinals			
2020	2nd	2nd	18	13	2	3	62	27	41				
2021	2nd	1st	18	14	3	90	17	73	45				
2022–23	1st	8th	24	5	2	17	33	84	17				
2023–24	1st	6th	27	14	1	12	70	66	43				
2024–25	1st	5th	27	11	1	15	58	89	34				
2025-26	1st	9th	21	2	0	19	31	116	6				

== Continental record ==
Scores list Khoromkhon’s goal tally first.

Season	Competition	Round	Club	Home	Away	Aggregate
2016	AFC Cup	QR	(Pakistan) K-Electric	0–1		3rd
2016	AFC Cup	QR	(Bhutan) Druk United	0–0		3rd

== Honours ==
- Mongolian Premier League: 2005, 2014
- Mongolia Cup: 2012
