= Ishdorjiin Otgonbayar =

Mongolian football manager

Ishdorjiin Otgonbayar (Mongolian: Ишдоржийн Отгонбаяр; born April 9, 1968 Ulaanbaatar, Mongolia) is a Mongolian football coach. He was coach of the Mongolia national team from 2000 to December 2010.
