= Deren, Dundgovi =

District in Dundgovi Province, Mongolia

Coordinates: 46°12′37″N 106°42′33″E

Deren District Дэрэн сум ᠳᠡᠷᠡᠩᠰᠤᠮᠤ
- District
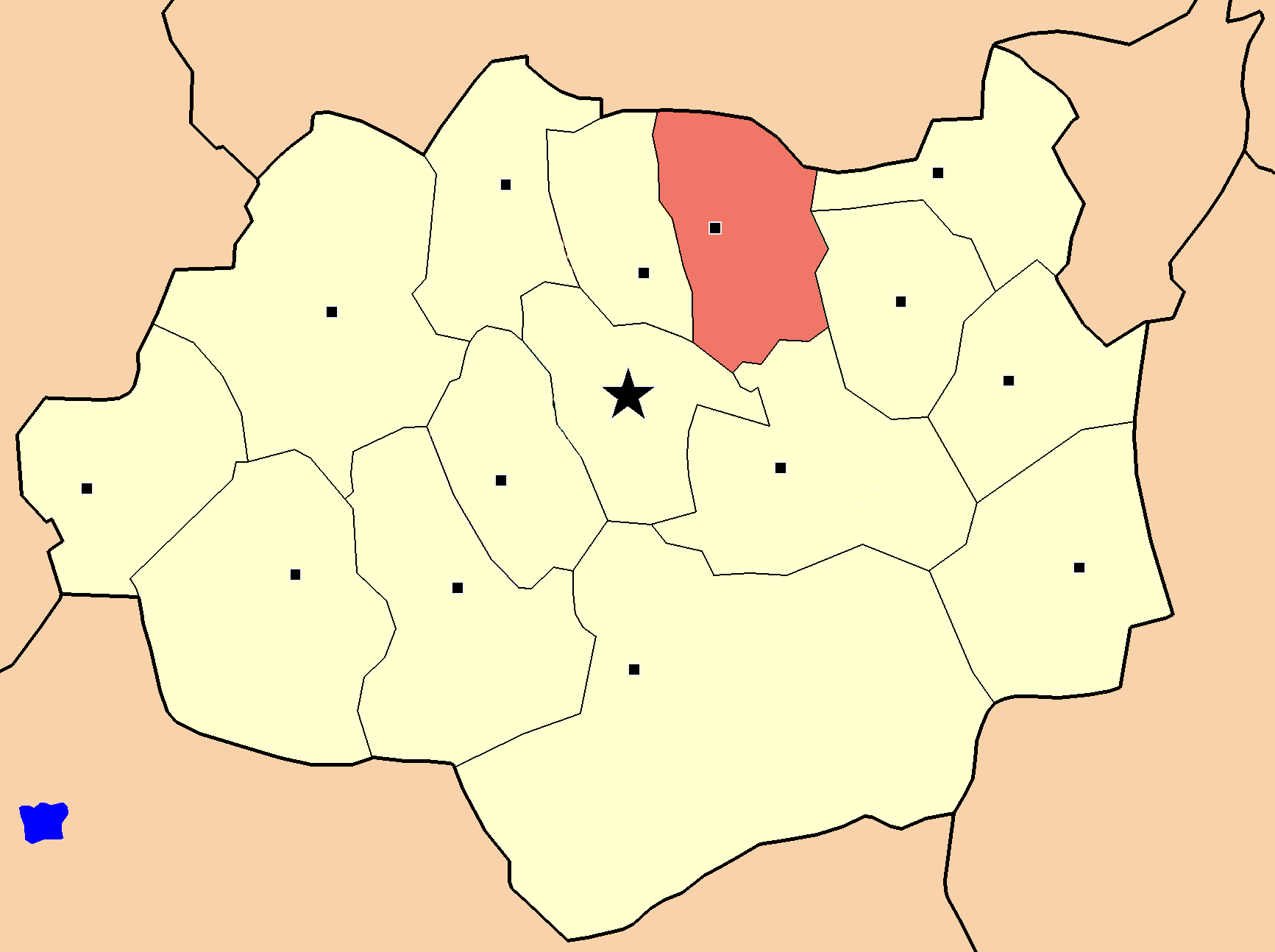
- Deren District in Dundgovi Province
- Country: Mongolia
- Province: Dundgovi Province

Area
  - Total: 3,624 km^{2} (1,399 sq mi)
- Time zone: UTC+8 (UTC + 8)

Deren (Mongolian: Дэрэн) is a sum (district) of Dundgovi Province in central Mongolia. In 2007, its population was 2,408.

== Administrative divisions ==
The district is divided into four bags, which are:

- Alag-Undur
- Bumbat
- Dolood
- Saruul
