= Khovdyn Khuleguud FC =

Association football club in Mongolia

Khovdyn Khuleguud
- Full name: Khovdyn Khuleguud Football Club
- Founded: 2018; 8 years ago
- Ground: MFF Football Centre
- Capacity: 5,000
- Owner: B. Bat-Erdene
- Manager: Garidmagnai Bayasgalan
- League: Mongolian Premier League
- 2025–26: Mongolian Premier League, 7th of 9
| Home colours | Away colours |

Khovd Football Club (also known as Khovdyn Khuleguud Football Club or Khovd Broncos for sponsorship reasons) is a Mongolian professional football club from Khovd, currently competing in the Mongolian Premier League.

== History ==
Khovd FC was founded in 2018. Following four seasons in the First League, the club was promoted to the Premier League for the 2021–22 season. Following their first top-flight campaign, it was announced that the club had been sold to B. Bat-Erdene and a new logo was unveiled.

== Domestic history ==
Key

Champion Runners-up Third place

| Season | League | | | | | | | Domestic cup | Notes |
| Season | Div. | Pos. | Pl. | W | D | L | P | Domestic cup | Notes |
|---|---|---|---|---|---|---|---|---|---|
| 2018 | 2nd | 5th | 10 | 5 | 1 | 4 | 16 | | |
| 2019 | 2nd | 4th | 18 | 10 | 4 | 4 | 34 | | |
| 2020 | 2nd | 3rd | 18 | 11 | 2 | 5 | 35 | | |
| 2021 | 2nd | 1st | 9 | 8 | 0 | 1 | 24 | | Promoted to Mongolia Premier League |
| 2021/22 | 1st | 9th | 18 | 3 | 2 | 13 | 11 | | |
| 2022/23 | 1st | | | | | | | | |
