= Mongolian Football Federation =

The governing body of association football in Mongolia

AFC
- Founded: 1959; 67 years ago
- Headquarters: Ulaanbaatar
- Location: Mongolia
- FIFA affiliation: 1998
- AFC affiliation: 1993
- EAFF affiliation: 2002
- President: Anandbazar Tsogt-Ochir
- Website: the-mff.mn (defunct)

The Mongolian Football Federation (MFF) (Note: Mongolian: Монголын Хөлбөмбөгийн Холбоо (МХХ), romanized: Mongoliin Khölbömbögiin Kholboo (MKK)) is the governing body of association football in Ulaanbaatar, Mongolia. It was founded in January 1959. It gained AFC affiliation in 1993 and FIFA affiliation in 1998. Its top league is the Mongolian National Premier League for both men and women.

== Association staff ==
Name	Position	Source
(Mongolia) Anandbazar Tsogt-Ochir	President	
(Mongolia) Sarangerel Ider	Female Vice President	
(Mongolia) Ganbaatar Myagmarjav	General Secretary	
(Mongolia) Enkhtuvshin Tumenjargal	Treasurer	
(Germany) Andreas Spier	Technical Director	
(Mongolia) Garidmagnai Bayasgalan	Men's National Coach	
(Mongolia) Erdenebat Sandagdorj	Women's National Coach	
(Mongolia) Enkhbat Chuluunbat	Media/Communications Manager	
(Mongolia) Tumenbayar Doljinsuren	Referee Coordinator	

In 1956, the prominent figure of the Mongolian military, Lieutenant General J. Lkhagvasuren, was appointed as the chairman of the Committee for Physical Culture and Sports Affairs under the Council of Ministers of the Mongolian People's Republic. From this year, the Mongolian national teams began to be formed under the committee, and a national football team was formed with 15 members, and the coaches and athletes were provided with salaries and uniforms. Subsequently, in October 1959, the Mongolian Football Federation was first established at the initiative of the national team athletes and began to work with a chairman, secretary, a board of coaches and referees, a children's and youth, a publicity and technical commission. The first head of the federation was the oldest Mongolian football teacher and coach N. Luvsandorj. (Later, the N. Luvsandorj Senior Football Tournament has been held annually since 1999, now called the Football Amateur and Masters Tournament). N. Luvsandorj (former founder and first chairman of the Mongolian Football Federation), Avarzed, Dugersuren (former Minister of National Defense), Dorjbat, Chultem, Gonchigjambaa, Sumkhuu (former Minister of National Defense), and Bavuu and Jadambaa of the Ministry of Defense, who studied military and civilian professions, as well as physical education teachers, at the Irkutsk Rabfak and other schools, laid the foundation for the development of football in the country.

Many people say that Soviet specialists who worked at the Ulaanbaatar Air Base, the General Military School, the Officers' School, the Central School of the Ministry of Internal Affairs, the military units located in Bayantumen and Matada, the Industrial Complex, and the Nalaikh Mine, (such as Rakhimov, a trainer at the Central School of the Ministry of Internal Affairs, Polishchuk, a trainer at the Central Military School, and Kozlov, a doctor at Nalaikh) contributed to the development of football and taught our first football players the basics of football.

In 1958, the Mongolian national men's football team played abroad for the first time. They traveled to Beijing, Tianjin, and Shanghai, China, for a 45-day training camp, and played seven matches against teams from these cities, winning two, drawing one, and losing four. They then participated in the 1960 Asian Football Championship held in Hanoi, the capital of the then Democratic Republic of Vietnam (North Vietnam), and in the following years, they played against teams from the Soviet Union, the Democratic People's Republic of Vietnam, and the DPRK at various levels. In 1993, the Mongolian national football team was re-established and participated in its first tournament, the First East Asian Games. In this tournament, the Mongolian team won its first historic victory in an international competition by defeating the Macau team 4–3. Subsequently, in 1996, the first Mongolian National Football League was held, and the following year, the Mongolian Football Federation was established, joining the Asian Football Confederation (AFF) and then the International Football Federation (FIFA), marking the beginning of a new era in the development of Mongolian football for both men and women.

== See also ==
- Mongolian Premier League
- Mongolia national football team
- Mongolia women's national football team
