= Deren FC =

Association football club in Mongolia

Deren
- Full name: Deren Football Club
- Founded: 2008; 18 years ago
- Ground: MFF Football Centre, Ulaanbaatar
- Capacity: 5,000
- Chairman: Munkhchuluun Garam
- League: Mongolian Premier League
- 2025-26: Mongolian Premier League, 3rd of 9
- Website: www.fcderen.com
Home colours	Away colours

Deren FC is a professional football club based in Ulaanbaatar, Mongolia. The club was founded in 2008 and currently plays in the Mongolian Premier League, making their debut appearance in the 2015 season.

The club was originally established as a youth academy. The decision to participate in the professional competition was made to provide the youth players with the opportunity to represent the Mongolian national team.

This local focus has been maintained to this day and has earned the club the reputation of being "The Nationals' Team" ("Монголын баг"). Their women's team plays in the Women's National Football League.

Deren FC is often organizing the DEREN CUP two times a year, where are participating many young teams from many different parts of the world: China, Russia and Europe. The tournament is considered very important especially for teams under 7, under 8, under 9 , under 10, under 11 and under 12.

Deren FC is considered one of the best teams in terms of coaching for young players and english is spoken too.

The team is giving the backbone to the Mongolian National Team.

Deren FC ha s recently opened the DEREN ACADEMY that is situated at 65km from Ulan Bator, where the young players can study and can play and training football in the afternoon.

== History ==
=== Domestic history ===
As of match played 10 September 2015

Season	League									Domestic Cup	Top goalscorer		Managers
Season	Div.	Pos.	Pl.	W	D	L	GS	GA	P	Domestic Cup	Name	League	Managers
2015	1st	7th	16	2	3	11	24	56	9	-			Vojislav Bralušić
2016	1st	5th	18	8	1	9	28	27	25	RU			Vojislav Bralušić
2017	1st	4th	18	9	2	7	18	15	29	SF			Vojislav Bralušić
2018	1st	5th	18	8	7	3	41	15	31	R16			Vojislav Bralušić
2019	1st	5th	22	10	5	7	41	28	35	QF			Paulo Jorge Silva
2020	1st	6th	18	10	3	5	40	21	33	Cancelled			Paulo Jorge Silva
2021	1st	2nd	18	11	2	5	32	19	35	Cancelled			Paulo Jorge Silva
2021–22	1st	4th	18	10	2	6	42	26	32	Cancelled			Munkhbat Purevdorj (Jun 21 - Nov 21) / Marek Fabula (Feb 22)
2022–23	1st	2nd	24	15	3	6	76	29	48	SF			Marek Fabula (Feb 22 - Dec 22) / Munkhbat Chimedorj (Dec 22)
2023–24	1st	3rd	27	15	6	6	80	32	51	SF			Munkhbat Chimedorj (Dec 22 - Dec 23 / Pedro Portela Pinto de Miranda (Jan 24)
2024–25	1st	4th	27	15	5	7	83	30	50				
2025–26	1st	3rd	23	14	3	6	68	25	45				

== Stadium ==
The club currently plays its home matches at the MFF Football Centre in Ulaanbaatar. The stadium, which opened in 2006, was renovated in 2013 by Deren FC's parent company, Deren Naran LLC, in collaboration with a Dutch partner, and now has a capacity of 5,000 spectators.

== Honours ==
- Mongolian Premier League: Runner-up 2021, 2022–23
- Mongolian Super Cup: 2022
