= Lkhamsürengiin Dorjsüren =

Mongolian football manager

Personal information
- Full name: Lkhamsürengiin Dorjsüren; Лхамсүрэнгийн Доржсүрэн
- Date of birth: 1 October 1948 (age 78)
- Place of birth: Mongolia

Managerial career
- Years: Team
- 1976–1993: Nairamdal
- 1993–2013: Erchim
- 1993, 1998: Mongolia

Lkhamsürengiin Dorjsüren (Mongolian: Лхамсүрэнгийн Доржсүрэн; born 1 October 1948) is a Mongolian professional football manager. In 1993 and 1998 he was coach of the Mongolia national football team.

== Career ==
From 1976 until 1993 he coached the Nairamdal. In 1993 he became the coach of Erchim. In 1993 and 1998 he was head coach of the Mongolia national football team.

== Achievements ==
- Mongolia Premier League: (8)
  - Winner: 1996, 1998, 2000, 2002, 2007, 2008, 2012, 2013
  - Runner-up: 1997, 1999, 2009
- Mongolia Cup: (7)
  - Winner: 1996, 1997, 1998, 1999, 2000, 2011, 2012
  - Runner-up: 2001, 2002
- Mongolia Super Cup: (3)
  - Winner: 2011, 2012, 2013
- National Championship
  - Winner: 1994
- National Youth Championship
  - Winner: 1994

== Awards ==
- Best Coach of the Year: 1996, 1997.
