= Gal-Erdenegiin Soyol-Erdene =

Mongolian footballer

Personal information
- Full name: Gal-Erdene Soyol-Erdene; Гал-Эрдэнэ Соёл-Эрдэнэ
- Date of birth: 16 March 1996 (age 30)
- Place of birth: Mongolia
- Height: 1.70 m (5 ft 7 in)
- Positions: Attacking midfielder; forward

Team information
- Current team: Erchim
- Number: 15

Youth career
- 2011–2013: Erchim

Senior career*
Years	Team	Apps	(Gls)
2013–	Erchim		

International career^{‡}
2015–	Mongolia U23	5	(0)
2014–	Mongolia	12	(1)
- * Club domestic league appearances and goals as of 22:20, 11 August 2016 (UTC) ‡ National team caps and goals as of 15:23, 10 June 2021 (UTC)

Gal-Erdene Soyol-Erdene (Mongolian: Гал-Эрдэнэгийн Соёл-Эрдэнэ; born 16 March 1996) is a Mongolian footballer who plays for the Erchim FC of the Mongolian Premier League, and the Mongolian national team.

== Club career ==
Soyol-Erdene was spotted and selected to play for the youth team of Erchim FC in 2011. He was promoted to Erchim's senior team of the Mongolian Premier League in 2013. With the club, he made two appearances in the 2013 AFC President's Cup, including in a 0–4 defeat to Balkan FK of Turkmenistan in the final rounds. He also made four appearances in the 2014 edition of the tournament and scored two goals, both in a match against Svay Rieng FC of Cambodia.

In January 2016 Soyol-Erdene, along with Erchim FC and Mongolia national team coach Zorigtyn Battulga and 15 year old Ganbold Ganbayar of Khoromkhon FC, spent a month training at The Hive Stadium with English club Barnet F.C. of League Two.

== International career ==
Soyol-Erdene participated with the Mongolia under-23 team in 2016 AFC U-23 Championship qualification. In June 2017 head coach Michael Weiß named him to Mongolia's roster for 2018 AFC U-23 Championship qualification which was scheduled to take place the following month. Mongolia was part of Group H along with Thailand, Indonesia, and Malaysia.

Soyol-Erdene made his senior international debut on 21 July 2014 in a 2015 EAFF East Asian Cup match against the Northern Mariana Islands. He also scored his first senior international goal in the match, an eventual 4–0 victory. Soyol-Erdene was later named to Mongolia's squad for 2018 FIFA World Cup qualification. He has also represented Mongolia at youth levels, including as part of the squad for 2016 AFC U-23 Championship qualification. Mongolia competed in Group J against China, Laos, and Singapore.

=== International goals ===
Scores and results list Mongolia's goal tally first.

#	Date	Venue	Opponent	Score	Result	Competition
1	21 July 2014	GFA National Training Center, Harmon, Guam	Northern Mariana Islands	2–0	4–0	2015 EAFF East Asian Cup
Last updated 11 August 2016

== Honours ==
=== Club ===
- Mongolian Premier League Winner (3): 2013, 2015, 2016
- Mongolian Premier League Runner-up (1): 2014
- Mongolia Super Cup (1): 2016
