= 2009 Mongolian Premier League =

Football league season in Mongolia

Mongolian National Championship
- Season: 2009
- Champions: Ulaanbaatar DS
- Top goalscorer: Ganbaataryn Togsbayar (15 goals)

The 2009 Mongolian National Championship was the forty-second recorded edition of top flight football in Mongolia and the fourteenth season of the Mongolian Premier League, which took over as the highest level of competition in the country from the previous Mongolian National Championship. Ulaanbaatar DS were champions, their first title, Erchim were runners up, with Khasiin Khulguud in third place.

== Participating teams ==
Location of teams in 2006 Mongolia Premier League
- Erchim – Ulaanbaatar Power Plant team
- Khangarid – Erdenet; town in northern Mongolia
- Kharaatsai – Ulaanbaatar
- Khasiin Khulguud – Bank team from Ulaanbaatar
- Khoromkhon – Ulaanbaatar
- Selenge Press – Ulaanbaatar
- Mazaalai – Ulaanbaatar
- Ulaanbaatar DS – team from Ulaanbaatar University, also known as UBDES

== Format ==
The 2006 season consisted of three distinct stages: the first stage consisted of a single group of eight teams all playing each other in a single round robin of matches. From this, the top six teams then qualified for the second stage, where they were split into two groups which again played a single round robin of matches. From this, the top two teams in each group qualified for single legged semi finals with the bottom teams progressing directly to the fifth place match.

== First stage ==
=== League table ===
Pos	Team	Pld	W	D	L	GF	GA	GD	Pts	Qualification or relegation
1	Khasiin Khulguud (Q)	7	4	3	0	18	8	+10	15	Second stage
2	Selenge Press (Q)	7	4	1	2	18	11	+7	13	Second stage
3	Khoromkhon (Q)	7	4	1	2	17	11	+6	13	Second stage
4	Ulaanbaatar DS (Q)	7	4	1	2	17	14	+3	13	Second stage
5	Erchim (Q)	7	3	1	3	16	15	+1	10	Second stage
6	Khangarid (Q)	7	3	0	4	17	21	−4	9	Second stage
7	Kharaatsai	7	2	0	5	13	21	−8	6	
8	Mazaalai	7	0	1	6	5	20	−15	1	

Updated to match(es) played on 15 August 2009. Source:
Rules for classification: 1) points; 2) goal difference; 3) number of goals scored.
(Q) Qualified for the phase indicated

=== Results ===
Home \ Away	ERC	KHN	KHR	KHS	KHO	SEL	MAZ	UDS
Erchim		2–3		2–5		1–4		
Khangarid			2–3			2–5		
Kharaatsai	2–5			2–4			2–1	1–2
Khasiin Khulguud		4–0			2–1		1–1	
Khoromkhon	1–1	2–3	4–2			2–1		
Selenge Press			3–1	1–1				1–3
Mazaalai	0–4	0–4			0–2	1–3		
Ulaanbaatar DS	0–1	3–5		1–1	2–5		4–2	

Updated to match(es) played on 15 August 2009. Source:
Legend: Blue = home team win; Yellow = draw; Red = away team win.

== Second stage ==
=== Group A ===
==== Table ====
Pos	Team	Pld	W	D	L	GF	GA	GD	Pts	Qualification or relegation
1	Khasiin Khulguud (Q)	2	1	1	0	3	2	+1	4	Third stage
2	Erchim (Q)	2	1	1	0	3	2	+1	4	Third stage
3	Khoromkhon	2	0	0	2	0	2	−2	0	

(Q) Qualified for the phase indicated

==== Results ====
Khoromkhon	0–1	Erchim
	report

Erchim	2–2	Khasiin Khulguud
	report

Khasiin Khulguud	1–0	Khoromkhon
	report

=== Group B ===
==== Table ====
Pos	Team	Pld	W	D	L	GF	GA	GD	Pts	Qualification or relegation
1	Selenge Press (Q)	2	1	0	1	4	4	0	3	Third stage
2	Ulaanbaatar DS (Q)	2	1	0	1	4	4	0	3	Third stage
3	Khangarid	2	1	0	1	3	3	0	3	

(Q) Qualified for the phase indicated

==== Results ====
Ulaanbaatar DS	0–3	Khangarid
	report

Khangarid	0–3	Selenge Press
	report

Selenge Press	1–4	Ulaanbaatar DS
	report

== Third stage ==
=== Semi finals ===
26 August 2009

Selenge Press	0–1	Erchim
	report

26 August 2009

Khasiin Khulguud	0–2	Ulaanbaatar DS
	report

=== Fifth place match ===
28 August 2009

Khoromkhon	3–5	Khangarid
	report

=== Third place match ===
29 August 2009

Khasiin Khulguud	3–1	Selenge Press
	report

=== Final ===
29 August 2009

Ulaanbaatar DS	2–0	Erchim
Altantulga 47'; Tsedenbal 75'	report

UB DS
Erchim

Ganbayar
Gancogt	(yellow card) 49'
Ganbat	(yellow card) 67'
Lümbengarav
Telmüün	(substituted off) 46'
Jardel
Tsedenbal
Altantulga
Tümenjargal
Battsengel	(substituted off) 70'
Ochbayar	(yellow card) 27' (yellow-red card) 90+2'
Substitutions:
Buman-Uchral	(substituted in) 47'
Amartüvshin	(substituted in) 70'

Delgerdalai
Altantogos
Enkhjargal	(red card) 81'
Darambayar
Bayambasüren	(substituted off) 56'
Mönkhbaatar
Anar
Ariunbold
Chinbaatar
Nyamgombo	(substituted off) 74'
Önönbayar	(substituted off) 60'
Substitutions:
Düürentögs	(substituted in) 56'
Amarsaikhan	(substituted in) 74'
Batnasan	(substituted in) 60'
