= 2012 AFC President's Cup =

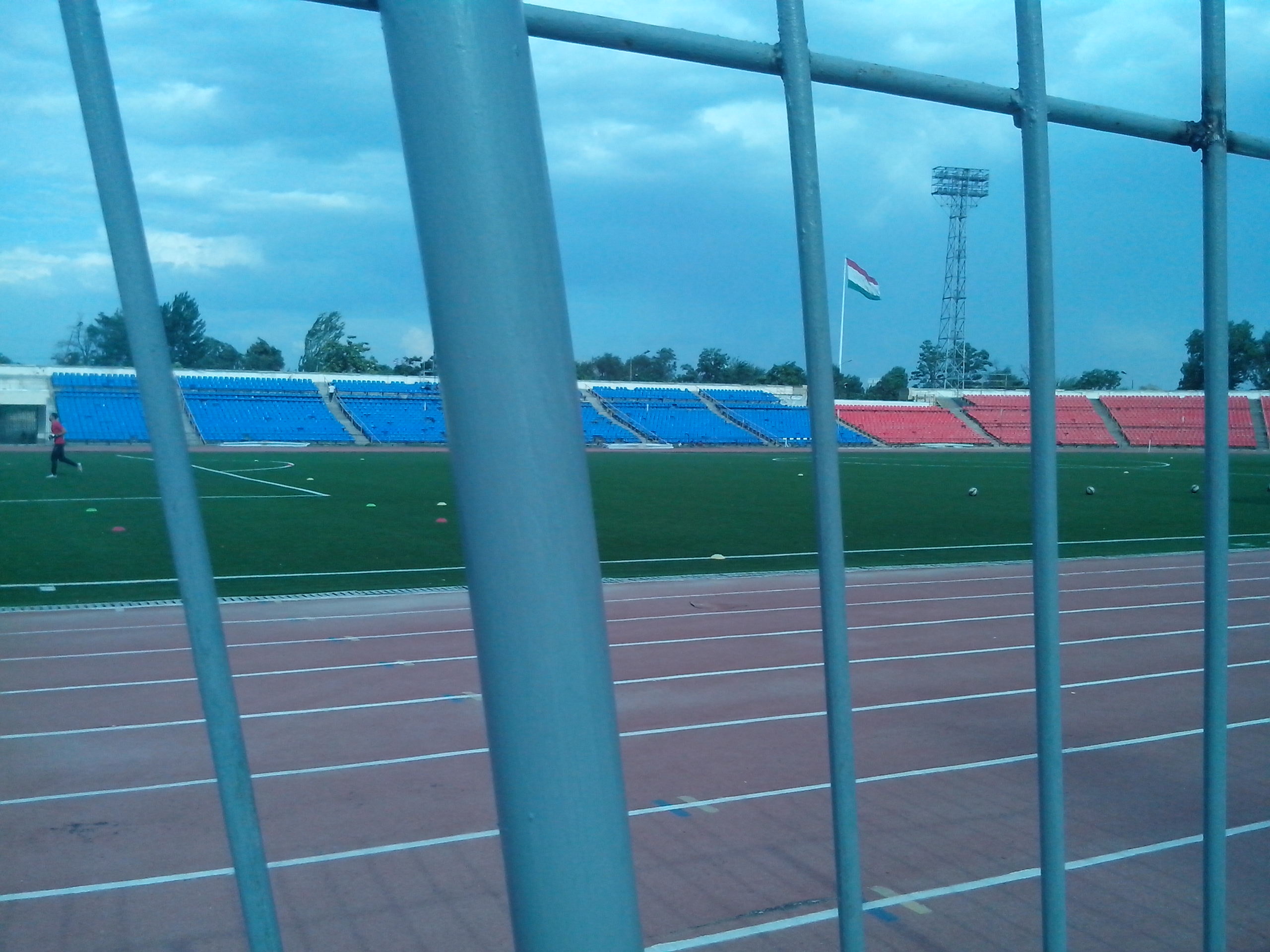
- Central Republican Stadium in Dushanbe hosted the final

Tournament details
- Host country: Tajikistan
- Dates: 5–12 May (group stage); 24–30 September (final stage)
- Teams: 6 (final stage); 11 (total) (from 11 associations)

Final positions
- Champions: (Tajikistan) Istiqlol (1st title)
- Runners-up: (Palestine) Markaz Shabab Al-Am'ari

Tournament statistics
- Matches played: 19
- Goals scored: 72 (3.79 per match)
- Attendance: 78,756 (4,145 per match)
- Top scorer(s): (Kyrgyzstan) Mirlan Murzaev (8 goals)
- Best player: (Tajikistan) Alisher Tuychiev

The 2012 AFC President's Cup was the eighth edition of the AFC President's Cup, a football competition organized by the Asian Football Confederation (AFC) for clubs from "emerging countries" in Asia.

Teams from 11 member associations entered the competition. Istiqlol became the second team from Tajikistan to win the AFC President's Cup, defeating Markaz Shabab Al-Am'ari from Palestine with a 2–1 win in the final.

== Venues ==
Dushanbe	Phnom Penh	Lahore
Central Republican Stadium	Olympic Stadium	Punjab Stadium
Capacity: 20,000	Capacity: 70,000	Capacity: 10,000

== Qualifying teams ==
The following 12 associations were represented in the 2012 AFC President's Cup.

Association	Team	Qualifying method	App	Last App
Bangladesh	Sheikh Jamal	2010–11 Bangladesh League champions	1st	none
Bhutan	Yeedzin	2011 A-Division champions	3rd	2011
Cambodia	Phnom Penh Crown	2011 Cambodian League champions	4th	2011
Chinese Taipei	Taiwan Power Company	2011 Intercity Football League champions	5th	2011
Kyrgyzstan	Dordoi Bishkek	2011 Kyrgyzstan League champions	7th	2010
Mongolia	Erchim	2011 Mongolia Super Cup winners	1st	none
Nepal	Nepal Police Club	2011–12 Nepal National League champions	5th	2011
Pakistan	KRL	2011 Pakistan Premier League champions	2nd	2010
Palestine	Markaz Shabab Al-Am'ari	2010–11 West Bank Premier League champions	1st	none
Sri Lanka	Ratnam	2011–12 Sri Lanka Football Premier League champions	4th	2008
Tajikistan	Istiklol	2011 Tajik League champions	2nd	2011
Turkmenistan	Balkan	2011 Ýokary Liga champions	2nd	2011

Notes

- Mongolia applied to enter the 2012 AFC President's Cup, and was approved by the AFC in November 2011, and made their debut in the competition.
- Myanmar applied for upgrade to the 2012 AFC Cup, and was approved by the AFC in November 2011.

== Schedule ==
Schedule of dates for 2012 competition.

- Group stage: 3–13 May
- Final stage: 24–30 September

== Group stage ==
Location of teams of the 2012 AFC President's Cup.
Group A (played in Pakistan)
Group B (played in Cambodia)
Group C (played in Tajikistan)

In the group stage, the twelve teams were divided into three groups of four teams each. Each group was played in a single round-robin format at a centralized venue. The top two teams from each group qualified for the final stage. The teams are ranked according to points (3 points for a win, 1 point for a tie, 0 points for a loss) and tie breakers are in following order:

1. Greater number of points obtained in the group matches between the teams concerned;
2. Goal difference resulting from the group matches between the teams concerned;
3. Greater number of goals scored in the group matches between the teams concerned;
4. Goal difference in all the group matches;
5. Greater number of goals scored in all the group matches;
6. Kicks from the penalty mark if only two teams are involved and they are both on the field of play;
7. Fewer score calculated according to the number of yellow and red cards received in the group matches; (1 point for each yellow card, 3 points for each red card as a consequence of two yellow cards, 3 points for each direct red card, 4 points for each yellow card followed by a direct red card)
8. Drawing of lots.

On 2 March 2012, the AFC announced that the three hosts for the qualification round were Phnom Penh Crown (Cambodia), KRL (Pakistan), and Istiqlol (Tajikistan). The draw for the group stage was held at the AFC house in Kuala Lumpur, Malaysia on 6 March 2012, 15:00 UTC+08:00.

=== Group A ===
Team	Pld	W	D	L	GF	GA	GD	Pts
(Chinese Taipei) Taiwan Power Company	2	1	1	0	1	0	+1	4
(Pakistan) KRL	2	0	2	0	0	0	0	2
(Mongolia) Erchim	2	0	1	1	0	1	−1	1
(Bangladesh) Sheikh Jamal (Note: Sheikh Jamal withdrew, citing security concern of playing in Pakistan.)	0	-	-	-	-	-	—	0

Notes:
- Matches played in Pakistan (host club: KRL).
- Times listed are UTC+05:00.
8 May 2012
20:00

KRL (Pakistan)	0–0	(Mongolia) Erchim
	Report

Punjab Stadium, Lahore
Attendance: 500
Referee: Wang Di (China P.R.)

10 May 2012
20:00

Erchim (Mongolia)	0–1	(Chinese Taipei) Taiwan Power Company
	Report	Chen Yi-wei 90+3'

Punjab Stadium, Lahore
Attendance: 250
Referee: Nivon Robesh Gamini (Sri Lanka)

12 May 2012
20:00

KRL (Pakistan)	0–0	(Chinese Taipei) Taiwan Power Company
	Report

Punjab Stadium, Lahore
Attendance: 500
Referee: Masoud Tufayelieh (Syria)

=== Group B ===
Team	Pld	W	D	L	GF	GA	GD	Pts
(Kyrgyzstan) Dordoi Bishkek	3	3	0	0	17	3	+14	9
(Cambodia) Phnom Penh Crown	3	2	0	1	9	1	+8	6
Nepal Police Club	3	1	0	2	5	6	−1	3
(Bhutan) Yeedzin	3	0	0	3	2	23	−21	0

- Matches played in Cambodia (host club: Phnom Penh Crown).
- Times listed are UTC+07:00.
5 May 2012
13:30

Phnom Penh Crown (Cambodia)	8–0	(Bhutan) Yeedzin
Sokumpheak 20'; Borey 26', 41', 66'; Sothy 54'; Suhana 61'; S. Pheng 76'; H. Pheng 85'	Report

Olympic Stadium, Phnom Penh
Attendance: 3,000
Referee: Jumpei Iida (Japan)
5 May 2012
16:30

Dordoi Bishkek (Kyrgyzstan)	5–1	Nepal Police Club
Murzaev 3', 14', 63'; Sharipov 12'; Baymatov 70'	Report	Pandey 45+1' (pen.)

Olympic Stadium, Phnom Penh
Attendance: 3,000
Referee: Fahad Al-Mirdasi (Saudi Arabia)

7 May 2012
13:30

Yeedzin (Bhutan)	2–11	(Kyrgyzstan) Dordoi Bishkek
Chencho 40'; Tshering 90+2'	Report	Murzaev 18', 27', 62', 81', 87'; Askarov 39'; Tetteh 45'; Maka Kum 59'; Anderson 64', 70'; Bekbolotov 90+1'

Olympic Stadium, Phnom Penh
Attendance: 978
Referee: Nagor Amir Noor Mohamed (Malaysia)
7 May 2012
16:30

Nepal Police Club	0–1	(Cambodia) Phnom Penh Crown
	Report	Borey 21'

Olympic Stadium, Phnom Penh
Attendance: 3,500
Referee: Khamis Al-Marri (Qatar)

9 May 2012
13:30

Nepal Police Club	4–0	(Bhutan) Yeedzin
Silwal 2', 71'; Shrestha 37'; Pandey 49'	Report

Olympic Stadium, Phnom Penh
Attendance: 1,500
Referee: Jumpei Iida (Japan)
9 May 2012
16:30

Phnom Penh Crown (Cambodia)	0–1	(Kyrgyzstan) Dordoi Bishkek
	Report	Baymatov 90' (pen.)

Olympic Stadium, Phnom Penh
Attendance: 5,531
Referee: Sukhbir Singh (Singapore)

=== Group C ===
Team	Pld	W	D	L	GF	GA	GD	Pts
(Tajikistan) Istiqlol	2	2	0	0	3	1	+2	6
(Palestine) Markaz Shabab Al-Am'ari	2	1	0	1	2	2	0	3
(Turkmenistan) Balkan	2	0	0	2	2	4	−2	0
(Sri Lanka) Ratnam (Note: Ratnam withdrew.)	0	-	-	-	-	-	—	0

Notes:
- Matches played in Tajikistan (host club: Istiqlol).
- Times listed are UTC+05:00.
5 May 2012
16:00

Balkan (Turkmenistan)	1–2	(Palestine) Markaz Shabab Al-Am'ari
Çoňkaýew 32'	Report	Kaware 59'; Keshkesh 90+2'

Central Republican Stadium, Dushanbe
Attendance: 2,000
Referee: Khurram Shahzad (Pakistan)

7 May 2012
16:00

Markaz Shabab Al-Am'ari (Palestine)	0–1	(Tajikistan) Istiqlol
	Report	Ergashev 75'

Central Republican Stadium, Dushanbe
Attendance: 7,000
Referee: Ma Ning (China P.R.)

9 May 2012
16:00

Istiqlol (Tajikistan)	2–1	(Turkmenistan) Balkan
Rabiev 41'; Vasiev 79' (pen.)	Report	Diwanow 66'

Central Republican Stadium, Dushanbe
Attendance: 9,000
Referee: Yudai Yamamoto (Japan)

== Final stage ==
The final stage was played at a centralized venue, to be chosen from one of the final stage qualifiers. The six teams which qualified for the final stage were divided into two groups of three teams each, played in a single round-robin format. The winner from each group qualified for the single-match final to decide the title.

Phnom Penh Crown (Cambodia), Istiqlol (Tajikistan) and Dordoi Bishkek (Kyrgyzstan) showed interest to organise the finals. On 18 July 2012, the AFC Competitions Committee decided to award the hosting rights of the finals to Tajikistan, and the decision was approved by the AFC Executive Committee on 19 July 2012. The draw for the finals was held in Dushanbe on 31 July 2012, 11:00 UTC+05:00.

- Times listed are UTC+05:00.

=== Group A ===
Team	Pld	W	D	L	GF	GA	GD	Pts
(Tajikistan) Istiqlol	2	2	0	0	8	0	+8	6
(Kyrgyzstan) Dordoi Bishkek	2	1	0	1	8	2	+6	3
(Cambodia) Phnom Penh Crown	2	0	0	2	0	14	−14	0

24 September 2012
16:00

Dordoi Bishkek (Kyrgyzstan)	0–2	(Tajikistan) Istiqlol
	Report	Ergashev 38'; Sodikov 58'

Central Republican Stadium, Dushanbe
Attendance: 5,118
Referee: Jumpei Iida (Japan)

26 September 2012
19:00

Phnom Penh Crown (Cambodia)	0–8	(Kyrgyzstan) Dordoi Bishkek
	Report	Baymatov 5', 72', 90'; Tetteh 8'; Kichin 58'; Anderson 63'; Shamshiev 75'; Sataev 83'

Central Republican Stadium, Dushanbe
Attendance: 2,132
Referee: Fahad Al-Mirdasi (Saudi Arabia)

28 September 2012
19:00

Istiqlol (Tajikistan)	6–0	(Cambodia) Phnom Penh Crown
Vasiev 26'; Tokhirov 47'; Sharipov 52'; Rabimov 58', 90+1'; Fatkhuloev 76'	Report

Central Republican Stadium, Dushanbe
Attendance: 9,999
Referee: Khamis Al-Marri (Qatar)

=== Group B ===
Team	Pld	W	D	L	GF	GA	GD	Pts
(Palestine) Markaz Shabab Al-Am'ari	2	1	1	0	6	2	+4	4
(Chinese Taipei) Taiwan Power Company	2	1	1	0	4	2	+2	4
(Pakistan) KRL	2	0	0	2	2	8	−6	0

24 September 2012
19:00

Taiwan Power Company (Chinese Taipei)	1–1	(Palestine) Markaz Shabab Al-Am'ari
Chen Yi-wei 87'	Report	Keshkesh 62'

Central Republican Stadium, Dushanbe
Attendance: 2,078
Referee: Nivon Robesh Gamini (Sri Lanka)

26 September 2012
16:00

KRL (Pakistan)	1–3	(Chinese Taipei) Taiwan Power Company
Adil 88'	Report	Ho Ming-tsan 55', 58'; Huang Kai-jun 90+4'

Central Republican Stadium, Dushanbe
Attendance: 1,565
Referee: Masoud Tufayelieh (Syria)

28 September 2012
16:00

Markaz Shabab Al-Am'ari (Palestine)	5–1	(Pakistan) KRL
Jamhour 41', 61'; Obeid 54', 56'; Aliwisat 70'	Report	Saad Ullah 40'

Central Republican Stadium, Dushanbe
Attendance: 1,782
Referee: Jumpei Iida (Japan)

=== Final ===
30 September 2012
19:00

Markaz Shabab Al-Am'ari (Palestine)	1–2	(Tajikistan) Istiqlol
Keshkesh 21'	Report	Ergashev 69'; Vasiev 78'

Central Republican Stadium, Dushanbe
Attendance: 19,323
Referee: Fahad Al-Mirdasi (Saudi Arabia)

Markaz Shabab Al-Am'ari	Istiqlol

GK	1	(Palestine) Abdullah Saidawi
DF	5	(Palestine) Khaled Mahdi
DF	7	(Palestine) Ahmed Salama
MF	8	(Palestine) Ayed Jamhour (c)	(yellow card) 77'
FW	9	(Palestine) Jamal Aliwisat
MF	14	(Palestine) Ma'aly Kaware	(yellow card) 90+4'
MF	18	(Palestine) Mahmoud Shaikhqasem
DF	21	(Palestine) Nour Owda
FW	22	(Palestine) Ahmed Keshkesh
DF	27	(Palestine) Hamza Zoubi
MF	45	(Palestine) Suleiman Obeid		(substituted off) 73'
Substitutions
MF	19	(Palestine) Adham Arar		(substituted on) 73'
Manager
(Palestine) Raed Juma'Assaf

GK	1	(Tajikistan) Alisher Tuychiev
DF	3	(Tajikistan) Sokhib Suvonkulov
DF	4	(Tajikistan) Eradj Rajabov
MF	5	(Tajikistan) Mahmadali Sodikov		(substituted off) 46'
DF	6	(Tajikistan) Davron Ergashev
MF	9	(Tajikistan) Nuriddin Davronov
MF	10	(Tajikistan) Jakhongir Jalilov	(yellow card) 9'
FW	12	(Tajikistan) Yusuf Rabiev		(substituted off) 46'
MF	17	(Tajikistan) Dilshod Vasiev (c)
MF	18	(Tajikistan) Fatkhullo Fatkhuloev	(yellow card) 54'
FW	25	(Tajikistan) Farkhod Tokhirov		(substituted off) 81'
Substitutions
MF	7	(Tajikistan) Ibrahim Rabimov		(substituted on) 46'
MF	23	(Germany) Alexander Frank		(substituted on) 46'
MF	24	(Tajikistan) Umedzhon Sharipov	(yellow card) 90'	(substituted on) 81'
Manager
(Serbia) Nikola Kavazović

Assistant referees:
Kim Sung-Il (Korea Republic)
Abu Bakar Salim Mahad Al-Amri (Oman)
Fourth official:
Jumpei Iida (Japan)

Match rules

- 90 minutes.
- 30 minutes of extra time if necessary.
- Penalty shoot-out if scores still level.
- Twelve named substitutes.
- Maximum of three substitutions.

2012 AFC President's Cup

1st title

== Top scorers ==
Rank	Player	Club	Group stage	Final stage	Total
1	(Kyrgyzstan) Mirlan Murzaev	(Kyrgyzstan) Dordoi Bishkek	8	0	8
2	(Kyrgyzstan) Azamat Baymatov	(Kyrgyzstan) Dordoi Bishkek	2	3	5
3	(Cambodia) Khim Borey	(Cambodia) Phnom Penh Crown	4	0	4
4	(Brazil) Anderson	(Kyrgyzstan) Dordoi Bishkek	2	1	3
4	(Tajikistan) Davron Ergashev	(Tajikistan) Istiqlol	1	2	3
4	(Tajikistan) Dilshod Vasiev	(Tajikistan) Istiqlol	1	2	3
4	(Palestine) Ahmed Keshkesh	(Palestine) Markaz Shabab Al-Am'ari	1	2	3

== See also ==
- 2012 AFC Champions League
- 2012 AFC Cup
