= 2014 AFC President's Cup =

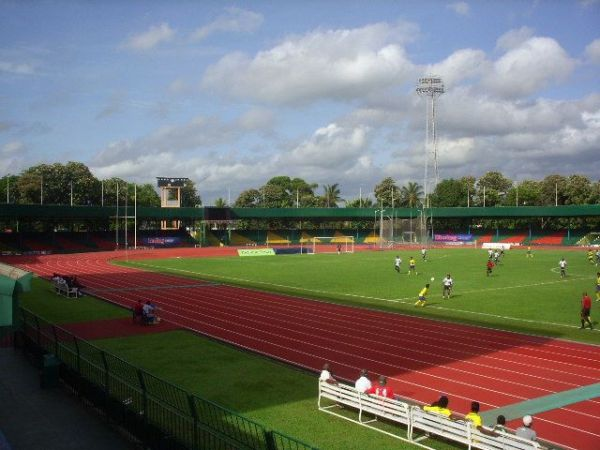
- Sugathadasa Stadium in Colombo hosted the final

Tournament details
- Host country: Sri Lanka (final stage); Mongolia, Philippines, Sri Lanka (group stage)
- Dates: 1–11 May 2014 (group stage); 20–26 September 2014 (final stage)
- Teams: 6 (final stage); 11 (total) (from 11 associations)

Final positions
- Champions: (Turkmenistan) HTTU Asgabat (1st title)
- Runners-up: (North Korea) Rimyongsu

Tournament statistics
- Matches played: 22
- Goals scored: 70 (3.18 per match)
- Attendance: 35,387 (1,609 per match)
- Top scorer(s): (Turkmenistan) Süleýman Muhadow (11 goals)
- Best player: (Turkmenistan) Süleýman Muhadow

The 2014 AFC President's Cup was the tenth edition of the AFC President's Cup, a football competition organized by the Asian Football Confederation (AFC) for clubs from "emerging countries" in Asia, and the final edition under the AFC President's Cup title, as the competition was relaunched under the name AFC Challenge League starting in 2024–25. Balkan were the defending champions, but failed to qualify for the tournament.

On 25 November 2013, the AFC Competitions Committee proposed the year of 2014 to be the last edition of the competition. Starting from 2015, league champions of emerging countries were eligible to participate in the AFC Cup qualifying play-off.

In the final, HTTU Aşgabat of Turkmenistan defeated Rimyongsu of North Korea 2–1, and became the second consecutive team from Turkmenistan to win the AFC President's Cup.

== Venues ==
Colombo	Bacolod	Ulaanbaatar
Sugathadasa Stadium	Panaad Stadium	MFF Football Centre
Capacity: 25,000	Capacity: 9,825	Capacity: 5,000

== Teams ==
Location of teams of the 2014 AFC President's Cup.
Group A (played in Sri Lanka)
Group B (played in the Philippines)
Group C (played in Mongolia)

The AFC laid out the procedure for deciding the participating associations, with the final decision to be made by the AFC on 26 November 2013. The following changes to the list of participating associations may be made from the 2013 AFC President's Cup if the AFC approves the following applications made by any association:

- An association originally participating in the AFC President's Cup may apply to participate in the 2014 AFC Cup.
- An association originally not participating in any AFC club competitions may apply to participate in the 2014 AFC President's Cup.

The following changes in the participating associations were made compared to the previous year:

- Kyrgyzstan and Palestine clubs' participation were upgraded from the AFC President's Cup to the AFC Cup starting from 2014 by the AFC.
- Clubs from North Korea were approved to participate in the AFC President's Cup for the first time in 2014.

Each participating association was given one entry. The following teams entered the competition.

Association	Team	Qualifying method	App	Last App
Bangladesh	Sheikh Russel	2012–13 Bangladesh Football Premier League champions	1st	none
Bhutan	Ugyen Academy	2013 Bhutan National League champions	1st	none
Cambodia	Svay Rieng	2013 Cambodian League champions	1st	none
Chinese Taipei	Tatung	2013 Intercity Football League champions	3rd	2007
Mongolia	Erchim	2013 Mongolian Premier League champions	3rd	2013
Nepal	Manang Marshyangdi Club	2013–14 Martyr's Memorial A-Division League champions	2nd	2006
North Korea	Rimyongsu	2013 Mangyongdae Prize Sports Games winners	1st	none
Pakistan	KRL	2013–14 Pakistan Premier League champions	4th	2013
Philippines	Ceres	2013–14 PFF–Smart National Club Championship winners	1st	none
Sri Lanka	Sri Lanka Air Force	2013 Sri Lanka Football Premier League champions	1st	none
Turkmenistan	HTTU Aşgabat	2013 Ýokary Liga champions	2nd	2010

Notes

1. Philippines (PHI): The PFF–Smart National Club Championship served as the qualifiers for the Philippines' club representative to the 2014 AFC President Cup, instead of the United Football League, which served this purpose for the 2013 AFC President's Cup. This means that Ceres, the 2013 PFF–Smart National Club Championship champions, instead of Stallion, the 2013 United Football League champions, were chosen to represent the Philippines in the 2014 AFC President Cup.

== Schedule ==
The schedule of the competition was as follows.

- Group stage: 1–11 May 2014
- Final stage: 20–26 September 2014

== Group stage ==
The draw for the group stage was held on 28 March 2014, 16:00 UTC+8, at the AFC House in Kuala Lumpur. The eleven teams were drawn into two groups of four and one group of three. Each group was played on a single round-robin basis at a centralized venue. The winners and runners-up of each group advanced to the final stage.

Tiebreakers

The teams are ranked according to points (3 points for a win, 1 point for a tie, 0 points for a loss). If tied on points, tiebreakers are applied in the following order:

1. Greater number of points obtained in the group matches between the teams concerned
2. Goal difference resulting from the group matches between the teams concerned
3. Greater number of goals scored in the group matches between the teams concerned
4. Goal difference in all the group matches
5. Greater number of goals scored in all the group matches
6. Penalty shoot-out if only two teams are involved and they are both on the field of play
7. Fewer score calculated according to the number of yellow and red cards received in the group matches (1 point for a single yellow card, 3 points for a red card as a consequence of two yellow cards, 3 points for a direct red card, 4 points for a yellow card followed by a direct red card)
8. Drawing of lots

=== Group A ===
Team	Pld	W	D	L	GF	GA	GD	Pts
(Bangladesh) Sheikh Russel	3	2	1	0	9	0	+9	7
Sri Lanka Air Force	3	2	0	1	4	5	−1	6
(Pakistan) KRL	3	1	1	1	3	3	0	4
(Bhutan) Ugyen Academy	3	0	0	3	0	8	−8	0

- Matches were played in Sri Lanka (all times UTC+5:30).
7 May 2014
16:00

Sri Lanka Air Force	1–0	(Bhutan) Ugyen Academy
Bandara 58'	Report

Sugathadasa Stadium, Colombo
Attendance: 600
Referee: Adham Makhadmeh (Jordan)
7 May 2014
18:30

KRL (Pakistan)	0–0	(Bangladesh) Sheikh Russel
	Report

Sugathadasa Stadium, Colombo
Attendance: 100
Referee: Ali Sabah Adday Al-Qaysi (Iraq)

9 May 2014
14:00

Ugyen Academy (Bhutan)	0–3	(Pakistan) KRL
	Report	Afridi 1'; Dawood 14'; Qasim 90+1'

Sugathadasa Stadium, Colombo
Attendance: 100
Referee: Chaiya Mahapab (Thailand)
9 May 2014
16:30

Sheikh Russel (Bangladesh)	5–0	Sri Lanka Air Force
Ahmed 14'; Mithun 35', 55'; Millien 60'; Bisswash 86'	Report

Sugathadasa Stadium, Colombo
Attendance: 300
Referee: Timur Faizullin (Kyrgyzstan)

11 May 2014
14:00

Sheikh Russel (Bangladesh)	4–0	(Bhutan) Ugyen Academy
Millien 14'; Mithun 21', 88'; Ahmed 28'	Report

Sugathadasa Stadium, Colombo
Attendance: 200
Referee: Ali Sabah Al-Qaysi (Iraq)
11 May 2014
16:30

Sri Lanka Air Force	3–0	(Pakistan) KRL
Duminda 3'; Dharshaka 7'; Ishan 9'	Report

Sugathadasa Stadium, Colombo
Attendance: 400
Referee: Adham Makhadmeh (Jordan)

=== Group B ===
Team	Pld	W	D	L	GF	GA	GD	Pts
(Turkmenistan) HTTU Aşgabat	3	2	1	0	5	2	+3	7
(North Korea) Rimyongsu	3	1	2	0	8	3	+5	5
(Philippines) Ceres	3	1	1	1	5	4	+1	4
(Chinese Taipei) Tatung	3	0	0	3	0	9	−9	0

- Matches were played in the Philippines (all times UTC+8).
6 May 2014
17:00

Ceres (Philippines)	2–2	(North Korea) Rimyongsu
Guirado 10'; Reichelt 49'	Report	Ri Kwang-hyok 39', 60'

Panaad Stadium, Bacolod
Attendance: 5,820
Referee: Yousef Al-Marzouq (Kuwait)
6 May 2014
19:30

HTTU Aşgabat (Turkmenistan)	2–0	(Chinese Taipei) Tatung
Muhadow 16', 87'	Report

Panaad Stadium, Bacolod
Attendance: 1,500
Referee: Rowan Arumughan (India)

8 May 2014
17:00

Rimyongsu (North Korea)	1–1	(Turkmenistan) HTTU Aşgabat
Ri Hyok-chol 81'	Report	Muhadow 80'

Panaad Stadium, Bacolod
Attendance: 2,200
Referee: Yousef Al-Marzouq (Kuwait)
8 May 2014
19:30

Tatung (Chinese Taipei)	0–2	(Philippines) Ceres
	Report	Reichelt 17'; Guirado 87'

Panaad Stadium, Bacolod
Attendance: 5,457
Referee: Win Cho (Myanmar)

10 May 2014
17:00

Ceres (Philippines)	1–2	(Turkmenistan) HTTU Aşgabat
De Murga 20'	Report	Muhadow 45+2', 90+4'

Panaad Stadium, Bacolod
Attendance: 5,940
Referee: Yousef Al-Marzouq (Kuwait)
10 May 2014
19:30

Tatung (Chinese Taipei)	0–5	(North Korea) Rimyongsu
	Report	Jang Song-hyok 7' (pen.); Jong Il-gwan 41'; Ri Hyok-chol 51'; Pak Song-chol 86', 88'

Panaad Stadium, Bacolod
Attendance: 700
Referee: Win Cho (Myanmar)

=== Group C ===
Team	Pld	W	D	L	GF	GA	GD	Pts
(Nepal) Manang Marshyangdi Club	2	1	1	0	6	3	+3	4
(Mongolia) Erchim	2	1	1	0	3	1	+2	4
(Cambodia) Svay Rieng	2	0	0	2	4	9	−5	0

- Matches were played in Mongolia (all times UTC+8).
1 May 2014
17:00

Manang Marshyangdi Club (Nepal)	6–3	(Cambodia) Svay Rieng
Rai 6', 63'; Daravorn 8' (o.g.); Azeez 24'; Maskey 76'; Malla 83'	Report	Veasna 36'; Tola 56', 85'

MFF Football Centre, Ulan Bator
Attendance: 2,800
Referee: Tayeb Shamsuzzaman (Bangladesh)

3 May 2014
15:00

Svay Rieng (Cambodia)	1–3	(Mongolia) Erchim
Mony Udom 15'	Report	Sothearoth 10' (o.g.); Gal-Erden 35', 45' (pen.)

MFF Football Centre, Ulan Bator
Attendance: 3,620
Referee: Vo Minh Tri (Vietnam)

5 May 2014
17:00

Erchim (Mongolia)	0–0	(Nepal) Manang Marshyangdi Club
	Report

MFF Football Centre, Ulan Bator
Attendance: 3,850
Referee: Ilgiz Tantashev (Uzbekistan)

== Final stage ==
The draw for the final stage, played at a centralized venue, was held on 25 July 2014, 12:00 UTC+8, at the AFC House in Kuala Lumpur, Malaysia. The six teams were drawn into two groups of three. Each group was played on a single round-robin basis, with the same ranking rules as the group stage. The winners of each group advanced to the final. The final was played as a single match, with extra time and penalty shoot-out used to decide the winner if necessary.

The final stage was played in Sri Lanka (all times UTC+5:30).

=== Group A ===
Team	Pld	W	D	L	GF	GA	GD	Pts
(Turkmenistan) HTTU Aşgabat	2	2	0	0	5	2	+3	6
(Nepal) Manang Marshyangdi Club	2	1	0	1	3	4	−1	3
Sri Lanka Air Force	2	0	0	2	2	4	−2	0

20 September 2014
16:00

Manang Marshyangdi Club (Nepal)	2–1	Sri Lanka Air Force
Sh. Shrestha 35'; Gurung 64' (pen.)	Report	Ishan 6'

Sugathadasa Stadium, Colombo
Attendance: 600
Referee: Abdulrahman Al-Jassim (Qatar)

22 September 2014
16:00

HTTU Aşgabat (Turkmenistan)	3–1	(Nepal) Manang Marshyangdi Club
Muhadow 28', 73', 83'	Report	Su. Shrestha 35'

Sugathadasa Stadium, Colombo
Attendance: 100
Referee: Adham Makhadmeh (Jordan)

24 September 2014
16:00

Sri Lanka Air Force	1–2	(Turkmenistan) HTTU Aşgabat
Ishan 21'	Report	Muhadow 83', 86'

Sugathadasa Stadium, Colombo
Attendance: 300
Referee: Adham Makhadmeh (Jordan)

=== Group B ===
Team	Pld	W	D	L	GF	GA	GD	Pts
(North Korea) Rimyongsu	2	2	0	0	9	0	+9	6
(Bangladesh) Sheikh Russel	2	1	0	1	1	4	−3	3
(Mongolia) Erchim	2	0	0	2	0	6	−6	0

20 September 2014
13:00

Erchim (Mongolia)	0–1	(Bangladesh) Sheikh Russel
	Report	Chigozie 65'

Sugathadasa Stadium, Colombo
Attendance: 300
Referee: Jarred Gillett (Australia)

22 September 2014
13:00

Rimyongsu (North Korea)	5–0	(Mongolia) Erchim
Ri Jin-hyok 20', 65'; Ri Hyok 22'; Ri Kwang-hyok 24'; Pak Song-chol 57'	Report

Sugathadasa Stadium, Colombo
Attendance: 200
Referee: Ilgiz Tantashev (Uzbekistan)

24 September 2014
13:00

Sheikh Russel (Bangladesh)	0–4	(North Korea) Rimyongsu
	Report	Ri Jin-hyok 31'; Pak Song-chol 45+4'; Ro Hak-su 51'; Kim Kyong-il 60'

Sugathadasa Stadium, Colombo
Attendance: 100
Referee: Abdulrahman Al-Jassim (Qatar)

=== Final ===
26 September 2014
16:00

HTTU Asgabat (Turkmenistan)	2–1	(North Korea) Rimyongsu
Jumanazarow 37'; Muhadow 55'	Report	Ri Kwang-hyok 87'

Sugathadasa Stadium, Colombo
Attendance: 200
Referee: Jarred Gillett (Australia)

FC HTTU	Rimyongsu

GK	1	(Turkmenistan) Nurgeldi Astanow	(yellow card) 78'
DF	2	(Turkmenistan) Hoshgeldy Hojovov
DF	3	(Turkmenistan) Şöhrat Söýünow
DF	4	(Turkmenistan) Akmyrat Jumanazarow
DF	13	(Turkmenistan) Annasähet Annasähedow	(yellow card) 80'
MF	23	(Turkmenistan) Dawid Sarkisow (c)	(yellow card) 24'
MF	17	(Turkmenistan) Gurbangeldi Batyrow		(substituted off) 87'
MF	11	(Turkmenistan) Nurýagdy Muhammedow
MF	5	(Turkmenistan) Azat Şamyradow
FW	20	(Turkmenistan) Pirmyrat Sultanow	(yellow card) 21'	(substituted off) 55'
FW	9	(Turkmenistan) Süleýman Muhadow
Substitutions
MF	26	(Turkmenistan) Orazberdy Myradov		(substituted on) 55'
MF	14	(Turkey) Okan Ersoy		(substituted on) 87'
Manager:
(Turkmenistan) Begench Garayev

GK	1	(North Korea) Ju Kwang-min
DF	3	(North Korea) Jang Song-hyok
DF	17	(North Korea) Ro Hak-su
DF	6	(North Korea) Ri Chang-ho
DF	22	(North Korea) Ri Kwang-hyok	(yellow card) 90'
MF	25	(North Korea) Kang Won-myong
MF	12	(North Korea) Ri Jin-hyok
MF	9	(North Korea) Pak Song-chol (c)	(yellow card) 85'
MF	7	(North Korea) Kim Kyong-il		(substituted off) 58'
FW	8	(North Korea) Ri Hyok		(substituted off) 83'
FW	10	(North Korea) Ri Hyok-chol
Substitutions
FW	11	(North Korea) Pak Chol-min		(substituted on) 58'
FW	26	(North Korea) Song Kum-song		(substituted on) 83'
Managers:
(North Korea) Jon Man-ho & Jo Tong-sop

Assistant referees:
Ashley Beecham (Australia)
P.N. Palliya Guruge (Sri Lanka)
Fourth official:
Abdulrahman Al-Jassim (Qatar)

Match rules

- 90 minutes.
- 30 minutes of extra time if necessary.
- Penalty shoot-out if scores still level.
- Twelve named substitutes.
- Maximum of three substitutions.

2014 AFC President's Cup

HTTU Aşgabat
1st Title

== Awards ==
Award	Player	Team
Most Valuable Player	(Turkmenistan) Süleýman Muhadow	(Turkmenistan) HTTU Aşgabat
Top Goalscorer	(Turkmenistan) Süleýman Muhadow	(Turkmenistan) HTTU Aşgabat

== Top scorers ==
Rank	Player	Team	Group stage	Final stage	Total
1	(Turkmenistan) Süleýman Muhadow	(Turkmenistan) HTTU Aşgabat	5	6	11
2	(Bangladesh) Mithun Chowdhury Mithun	(Bangladesh) Sheikh Russel	4	0	4
2	(North Korea) Pak Song-chol	(North Korea) Rimyongsu	2	2	4
2	(North Korea) Ri Kwang-hyok	(North Korea) Rimyongsu	2	2	4
5	(North Korea) Ri Jin-hyok	(North Korea) Rimyongsu	0	3	3
5	(Sri Lanka) Kavindu Ishan	Sri Lanka Air Force	1	2	3
7	(Bangladesh) Shakil Ahmed	(Bangladesh) Sheikh Russel	2	0	2
7	(Haiti) Pascal Millien	(Bangladesh) Sheikh Russel	2	0	2
7	(Cambodia) Nub Tola	(Cambodia) Svay Rieng	2	×	2
7	(Mongolia) Soyol-Erdene Gal-Erdene	(Mongolia) Erchim	2	0	2
7	(Nepal) Dipak Rai	(Nepal) Manang Marshyangdi Club	2	0	2
7	(North Korea) Ri Hyok-chol	(North Korea) Rimyongsu	2	0	2
7	(Philippines) Juan Luis Guirado	(Philippines) Ceres	2	×	2
7	(Philippines) Patrick Reichelt	(Philippines) Ceres	2	×	2

== See also ==
- 2014 AFC Cup
- 2014 AFC Champions League
