= 2007 Mongolian Premier League =

Football league season in Mongolia

Mongolian National Championship
- Season: 2007
- Champions: Erchim
- Matches: 78
- Goals: 359 (4.6 per match)
- Top goalscorer: D. Enkhtaivan (26 goals)
- Biggest home win: Khasiin Khulguud 14–0 UB United
- Biggest away win: UB United 1–15 Erchim
- Highest scoring: UB United 1–15 Erchim
- Longest winning run: Erchim (5 matches)
- Longest unbeaten run: Khangarid (11 matches)
- Longest winless run: UB United (9 matches)
- Longest losing run: UB United (9 matches)

The 2007 Mongolian National Championship was the fortieth recorded edition of top flight football in Mongolia and the twelfth season of the Mongolian Premier League, which took over as the highest level of competition in the country from the previous Mongolian National Championship. Erchim were champions, their second title, Khangarid were runners up, with Khoromkhon in third place.

== Participating teams ==
Location of teams in 2006 Mongolia Premier League
- Cowboys – Ulaanbaatar
- Erchim – Ulaanbaatar Power Plant team
- Khangarid – Erdenet; town in northern Mongolia
- Kharaatsai – Ulaanbaatar
- Khasiin Khulguud – Bank team from Ulaanbaatar
- Khoromkhon – Ulaanbaatar
- Mazaalai – Ulaanbaatar
- UB United – Ulaanbaatar
- UB College – team from Ulaanbaatar University

== Format ==
The 2006 season consisted of two distinct stage: the first stage consisted of a league competition in which the nine competing teams all played each other twice in home and away matches. Following completion of this stage, the top four teams qualified for the second stage, the championship playoffs. This consisted of two legged semi-finals, from which the winners qualified for the final match with the losers playing a third place play off.

== First stage ==
=== League table ===
Pos	Team	Pld	W	D	L	GF	GA	GD	Pts	Qualification or relegation
1	Khangarid (Q)	16	11	3	2	57	23	+34	36	Championship playoffs
2	Erchim (Q)	16	10	3	3	48	14	+34	33	Championship playoffs
3	Khoromkhon (Q)	16	8	2	6	38	31	+7	26	Championship playoffs
4	Cowboys (Q)	16	7	3	6	26	25	+1	24	Championship playoffs
5	Khasiin Khulguud	16	7	2	7	42	21	+21	23	
6	UB College	16	6	5	5	38	32	+6	23	
7	Kharaatsai	16	5	4	7	42	36	+6	19	
8	Mazaalai	16	3	4	9	25	43	−18	13	
9	UB United	16	2	0	14	16	107	−91	6	

Updated to match(es) played on 24 August 2007. Source:
Rules for classification: 1) points; 2) goal difference; 3) number of goals scored.
(Q) Qualified for the phase indicated

=== Results ===
Home \ Away	COW	ERC	KHN	KHR	KHS	KHO	MAZ	UBC	UBU
Cowboys		0–5	2–1	0–0	0–3	2–1	4–0	3–3	1–0
Erchim	2–1		1–1	3–1	1–0	4–1	4–0	3–0	4–0
Khangarid	2–1	2–0		4–1	2–1	4–1	0–0	6–1	3–2
Kharaatsai	4–3	1–1	2–5		2–0	2–3	2–4	5–1	8–0
Khasiin Khulguud	0–0	1–3	4–1	5–2		1–2	2–5	2–0	14–0
Khoromkhon	0–1	2–0	1–5	5–3	0–4		2–0	1–1	7–0
Mazaalai	1–0	2–2	3–8	0–0	1–1	1–4		1–3	3–2
UB College	3–0	1–0	2–2	1–1	1–4	2–2	3–1		6–1
UB United	1–7	1–15	1–11	1–8	1–0	1–6	5–4	0–10	

Updated to match(es) played on 24 August 2007. Source:
Legend: Blue = home team win; Yellow = draw; Red = away team win.

== Championship playoffs ==
=== Semi-finals ===
Team 1	Agg.	Team 2	1st leg	2nd leg
Erchim	7–2	Khoromkhon	4–0	2–3
Khangarid	11–5	Cowboys	3–3	2–8

=== Third place match ===
1 September 2007

Khoromkhon	1–0	Cowboys
Batgerel 81'	Report

=== Final ===
1 September 2007

Erchim	1–0	Khangarid
Garidmagnai 55'; Garidmagnai (red card) 69'	Report	Lümbengarav (red card) 83'

== Top scorers ==
Position	Player	Team	Goals
1	(Mongolia) Dagva Enkhtaivan	Khasiin Khulguud	26
2	(Mongolia) Donorovyn Lümbengarav	Khangarid	21
3	(Mongolia) O. Munkh-Od	Khangarid	16

== Other honours ==
Award	Player	Team
Best goalkeeper	B. Sergelen	Cowboys
Best defender	Bayasgalangiin Garidmagnai	Erchim
Best midfielder	Khürelbaataryn Tsend-Ayuush	Khoromkhon
Best forward	D. Enkhtaivan	Khasiin Khulguud
Best referee	B. Khayankhyarvaa	N.A.
