= 2010 Mongolian Premier League =

Football league season in Mongolia

Mongolian Premier League
- Season: 2010
- Champions: Khangarid
- AFC President's Cup: Khangarid

Statistics of Mongolian Premier League in the 2010 season.

== Overview ==
Khangarid won the championship.

== League standings ==
Pos	Team	Pld	W	D	L	GF	GA	GD	Pts	Qualification
1	Khangarid	6	4	1	1	13	5	+8	13	Qualify for Group A
2	Mazaalai	6	4	1	1	12	7	+5	13	Qualify for Group B
3	Erchim	6	3	2	1	9	6	+3	11	Qualify for Group A
4	Khoromkhon	6	2	1	3	6	10	−4	7	Qualify for Group B
5	Ulaanbaatar University	6	2	0	4	9	12	−3	6	Qualify for Group A
6	Selenge Press	6	2	0	4	12	18	−6	6	Qualify for Group B
7	Khasiin Khulguud	6	1	1	4	11	14	−3	4	

== Group A standings ==
Pos	Team	Pld	W	D	L	GF	GA	GD	Pts	Qualification
1	Ulaanbaatar University	2	1	0	1	3	1	+2	3	Qualified for semi-finals
2	Khangarid	2	1	0	1	2	3	−1	3	Qualified for semi-finals
3	Erchim	2	1	0	1	1	2	−1	3	

== Group B standings ==
Pos	Team	Pld	W	D	L	GF	GA	GD	Pts	Qualification
1	Selenge Press	2	2	0	0	7	3	+4	6	Qualified for semi-finals
2	Mazaalai	2	1	0	1	4	3	+1	3	Qualified for semi-finals
3	Khoromkhon	2	0	0	2	3	8	−5	0	

== Play-offs ==
=== Bracket ===
Semi-finals
Ulaanbaatar University	1 (4)
Mazaalai (pen.)	1 (5)
Selenge Press	2
Khangarid	3

Final
Mazaalai	1
Khangarid	2
Third-place
Ulaanbaatar University	2 (4)
Selenge Press (pen.)	2 (5)
