= Battulga =

Battulga (Mongolian: Баттулга) is a Mongolian masculine given name that may refer to

- Khaltmaagiin Battulga (born 1963), President of Mongolia
- Khishigdalain Battulga (born 1974), Mongolian football defender
- Zorigtyn Battulga (born 1986), Mongolian football forward
