= 2014 Mongolian Premier League =

Football league season in Mongolia

Mongolian Premier League
- Season: 2014
- Champions: Khoromkhon
- 2015 AFC Cup: Khoromkhon
- Matches: 46
- Goals: 173 (3.76 per match)
- Biggest home win: Ulaanbaatar University 7–0 Ulaanbaataryn Mazaalaynuud
- Biggest away win: Ulaanbaataryn Mazaalaynuud 0–7 Erchim
- Highest scoring: Erchim 7–1 Khangarid; FC Ulaanbaatar 7–1 Ulaanbaataryn Mazaalaynuud
- Longest winning run: Khoromkhon (5 matches)
- Longest unbeaten run: Khoromkhon (14 matches)
- Longest winless run: Mazaalay (12 matches)
- Longest losing run: Mazaalay (12 matches)

The 2014 Mongolian Premier League also known as Niislel Lig or Capital League is the 47th edition of the tournament. Ulaanbaataryn Mazaalaynuud returned to the league after withdrawing from competition in the 2012 season, replacing Khasiin Khulguud to keep the number of teams at seven. The season started on 25 June and ended with the championship match on 30 August 2013. The top four teams in the standings advanced to the single elimination playoff stage.

== Clubs ==
=== Clubs and locations ===
Location of teams in 2014 Mongolia Premier League

Club	City	Stadium	Capacity
Erchim	Ulaanbaatar	National Sports Stadium	20,000
FC Ulaanbaatar	Ulaanbaatar	MFF Football Centre	3,500
Khangarid	Erdenet	Erdenet Stadium	7,000
Khoromkhon	Ulaanbaatar	MFF Football Centre	3,500
Ulaanbaataryn Mazaalaynuud	Ulaanbaatar	MFF Football Centre	3,500
Selenge Press	Ulaanbaatar	MFF Football Centre	3,500
Ulaanbaatar University	Ulaanbaatar	MFF Football Centre	3,500

== League table ==
Pos	Team	Pld	W	D	L	GF	GA	GD	Pts	Qualification or relegation
1	Erchim (Q)	12	8	4	0	34	10	+24	28	Qualified for playoff stage
2	Khoromkhon (Q)	12	8	4	0	27	11	+16	28	Qualified for playoff stage
3	Ulaanbaatar University (Q)	12	7	2	3	25	12	+13	23	Qualified for playoff stage
4	Khangarid (Q)	12	5	1	6	18	27	−9	16	Qualified for playoff stage
5	FC Ulaanbaatar	12	4	1	7	25	22	+3	13	
6	Selenge Press	12	4	0	8	22	24	−2	12	
7	Ulaanbaataryn Mazaalaynuud	12	0	0	12	7	52	−45	0	

Updated to match(es) played on 24 August 2014. Source: RSSSF
Rules for classification: 1) points; 2) goal difference; 3) number of goals scored.
(Q) Qualified for the phase indicated

== Results ==
=== First round ===
Home \ Away	ERC	FCU	KHA	KHO	MAZ	SEL	ULU
Erchim		1–1	7–1	1–1	2–0	3–0	2–1
FC Ulaanbaatar	1–3		0–3	1–2	7–1	0–4	1–2
Khangarid	1–1	0–4		1–2	2–1	3–2	2–1
Khoromkhon	2–2	3–1	3–0		3–0	3–2	1–1
Ulaanbaataryn Mazaalaynuud	0–7	1–6	1–4	0–3		2–3	0–2
Selenge Press	1–2	0–2	2–1	1–3	6–1		1–3
Ulaanbaatar University	1–3	2–1	3–0	1–1	7–0	1–0	

Updated to match(es) played on 24 August 2014. Source: RSSSF
Legend: Blue = home team win; Yellow = draw; Red = away team win.

=== Final stages ===
==== Semifinals ====
27 August 2014

Erchim	3–1	Khangarid
	Report

28 August 2014

Khoromkhon	7–1	Ulaanbaatar University
	Report

==== Third place playoff match ====
30 August 2014

Khangarid	1–1	Ulaanbaatar University
	Report
Penalties
	4–3

==== Final ====
30 August 2014

Erchim	0–1	Khoromkhon
	Report
