= 2004 Mongolian Premier League =

Football league season in Mongolia

Mongolian National Championship
- Season: 2004
- Champions: Khangarid

The 2004 Mongolian National Championship was the thirty-seventh recorded edition of top flight football in Mongolia and the ninth season of the Mongolian Premier League, which took over as the highest level of competition in the country from the previous Mongolian National Championship. Khangarid from Erdenet were champions, their second title, Khoromkhon were runners up, with Ordiin-Od in third place.

== Participants ==
- Erchim
- Ordiin-Od
- Ulaanbaatar Mazaalai
- Ulaanbaatar United
- Khangarid
- Khoromkhon

== Format ==
The competition was played in two stages: firstly a regular league competition. Following this, four of the six competing teams qualified for the semifinal playoffs, the winners of which advanced to a one off final, with the losers contesting a third place match.

=== Playoffs ===
Erchim and Mazalaai were eliminated in the regular stage, the other four participants proceeded to the playoff stage.

==== Bracket ====
Semi-finals
Khangarid	4
Ulaanbaatar United	2
Khoromkhon	3
Ordiin-Od	0

Final
Khangarid	1
Khoromkhon	0
Third-place
Ordiin-Od	2
Ulaanbaatar United	1

==== Semi-finals ====
8 August 2004

Khangarid	4–2	Ulaanbaatar United
	report

8 August 2004

Khoromkhon	3–0	Ordiin-Od
	report

==== Third-place ====
10 August 2004

Ordiin-Od	2–1 (a.e.t.)	Ulaanbaatar United
Gerelt-Od	report

==== Final ====
10 August 2004

Khangarid	1–0	Khoromkhon
Buman-Uchral 80'	report
