= 2003 Mongolian Premier League =

Football league season in Mongolia

Mongolian National Championship
- Season: 2003
- Champions: Khangarid
- Matches: 34
- Goals: 184 (5.41 per match)
- Top goalscorer: Bayazorig Khangarid
- Biggest home win: Khangarid 14–2 Mazaalai
- Biggest away win: Mazaalai 2–5 Khangarid; Ordiin-Od 0–5 Mon-Uran
- Highest scoring: Khangarid 14–2 Mazaalai
- Longest unbeaten run: Mon-Uran (13 matches)

The 2003 Mongolian National Championship was the thirty-sixth recorded edition of top flight football in Mongolia and the eighth season of the Mongolian Premier League, which took over as the highest level of competition in the country from the previous Mongolian National Championship. Khangarid from Erdenet, their second title, Mon-Uran were runners up, with Erchim in third place.

== Format ==
The competition was played in two stages: firstly a triple round robin league competition where each team played the others three time. Following this, four of the five competing teams qualified for the semifinal playoffs, the winners of which advanced to a one off final, with the losers contesting a third place match.

== Results ==
=== League table ===
Pos	Team	Pld	W	D	L	GF	GA	GD	Pts	Qualification or relegation
1	Mon-Uran (Q)	12	9	3	0	39	13	+26	30	Play-off rounds
2	Khangarid (Q)	12	8	1	3	58	21	+37	25	Play-off rounds
3	Ordiin-Od (Q)	12	6	1	5	21	30	−9	19	Play-off rounds
4	Erchim (Q)	12	3	1	8	25	36	−11	10	Play-off rounds
5	Mazaalai	12	1	0	11	20	63	−43	3	

Source: RSSSF
Rules for classification: 1) points; 2) goal difference; 3) number of goals scored.
(Q) Qualified for the phase indicated

=== Results table ===
==== Matches 1–20 ====
Home \ Away	ERC	KHA	MON	ORD	MAZ
Erchim		1–5	3–3	2–3	3–1
Khangarid	4–2		1–1	1–2	8–0
Mon-Uran	1–0	3–2		1–1	6–0
Ordiin-Od	1–2	0–2	0–3		3–1
Mazaalai	5–6	2–7	1–5	3–5	

Updated to match(es) played on the final day of the season. Source: RSSSF
Legend: Blue = home team win; Yellow = draw; Red = away team win.

==== Matches 21–30 ====
Home \ Away	ERC	KHA	MON	ORD	MAZ
Erchim				1–2	0–3
Khangarid	4–3			8–2	14–2
Mon-Uran	4–2	3–2			4–1
Ordiin-Od			0–5		2–1
Mazaalai					

Updated to match(es) played on the final day of the season. Source: RSSSF
Legend: Blue = home team win; Yellow = draw; Red = away team win.

=== Playoffs ===
==== Bracket ====
Semi-finals
Mon-Uran	3
Erchim	2
Khangarid	4
Ordiin-Od	0

Final
Khangarid	2
Mon-Uran	1
Third-place
Erchim	8
Ordiin-Od	1

==== Semi-finals ====
Mon-Uran	3–2	Erchim
Bat-Jalalt 23'; Jardel 40'; Ganbold 89'	report	Cingis 37' (o.g.); Purevsuch 67'

Khangarid	4–0	Ordiin-Od
Erdenesajchan 37'; Mench-Od 59'; Buman-Ucral 83'; Ganzajaa 89'	report

==== Third-place ====
18 August 2003?

Erchim	8–1	Ordiin-Od
Tegsbajar 11', 26', 36', 90'; A.Tamir 51', 90+1'; Batnasan 42'; Purevsuch 86'	report	Menchbat 53'

==== Final ====
18 August 2003

Khangarid	2–1	Mon-Uran
Bajarzorig 40'; Buman Ucral 41'	report	Menchbaatar 16'

== Topscorers ==
Position	Player	Team	Goals
1	(Mongolia) Davaa Bayarzorig	Khangarid	24
2	(Mongolia) Erdenebat	Mon-Uran	12
3	(Mongolia) Purevsuch	Erchim	11
3	(Brazil) Jardel	Mon-Uran	11
5	(Mongolia) Munkhtogtokh Idersaikhan	Khangarid	10
5	(Mongolia) Ganzorig Erdene-Ochir	Mazaalai	10
