= 2006 Mongolian Premier League =

Football league season in Mongolia

Mongolian National Championship
- Season: 2006
- Champions: Khoromkhon
- Matches: 32
- Goals: 173 (5.41 per match)
- Biggest home win: Khoromkhon 12–0 Khötöl; Darkhan 12–0 Khötöl
- Biggest away win: Darkhan 0–5 Khangarid
- Highest scoring: Khoromkhon 12–0 Khötöl; Darkhan 12–0 Khötöl
- Longest unbeaten run: Khoromkhon (6 matches)
- Longest winless run: Khötöl; Mazaalai; Zamyn-Üüd; Selenge Press (3 matches)

The 2006 Mongolian National Championship was the thirty-ninth recorded edition of top flight football in Mongolia and the eleventh season of the Mongolian Premier League, which took over as the highest level of competition in the country from the previous Mongolian National Championship. Khoromkhon were champions, their second title, Khasiin Khulguud were runners up, with Khangarid in third place.

== Participating teams ==
Location of teams in 2006 Mongolia Premier League
- Baganuur – Baganuur; village/town near Ulaanbaatar to the east
- Darkhan – Darkhan; town in northern Mongolia
- Khangarid – Erdenet; town in northern Mongolia
- Kharaatsai – Ulaanbaatar
- Khasiin Khulguud – Bank team from Ulaanbaatar
- Khoromkhon – Ulaanbaatar
- Khötöl – Khötöl; village/town near Ulaanbaatar
- Selenge Press – Ulaanbaatar
- Mazaalai – Ulaanbaatar
- Ulaanbaatar – team from Ulaanbaatar University
- Zamchin – Ulaanbaatar
- Zamyn-Üüd – Zamyn-Üüd; town in southern Mongolia

== Format ==
The 2006 season consisted of three distinct stage: the first stage consisted of three groups of four teams, with each group playing a single round robin of matches. From this stage, the top two teams in each group in addition to the two third placed teams with the best records advanced to the next set of matches. The second round consisted of two further groups of four teams, with each group again contesting a single round robin of matches. The winners of each group then progressed directly to a single leg final match, whilst the runners up in each group contested a third place play off match.

== First stage ==
=== Group A ===
Pos	Team	Pld	W	D	L	GF	GA	GD	Pts	Qualification or relegation
1	Khoromkhon (Q)	3	2	1	0	18	1	+17	7	Second stage
2	Zamchin (Q)	3	1	2	0	11	5	+6	5	Second stage
3	Darkhan (Q)	3	1	1	1	16	9	+7	4	Second stage
4	Khötöl	3	0	0	3	2	32	−30	0	

(Q) Qualified for the phase indicated

Khoromkhon	0–0	Zamchin
	report

Khoromkhon	6–1	Darkhan
	report

Khoromkhon	12–0	Khötöl
	report

Darkhan	12–0	Khötöl
	report

Zamchin	3–3	Darkhan
	report

Zamchin	8–0	Khötöl
	report

=== Group B ===
Pos	Team	Pld	W	D	L	GF	GA	GD	Pts	Qualification or relegation
1	Selenge Press (Q)	3	1	2	0	10	5	+5	5	Second stage
2	Mazaalai (Q)	3	1	2	0	5	2	+3	5	Second stage
3	Khasiin Khulguud (Q)	3	0	3	0	5	5	0	3	Second stage
4	Ulaanbaatar	3	0	1	2	4	12	−8	1	

(Q) Qualified for the phase indicated

Selenge Press	1–1	Mazaalai
	report

Selenge Press	2–2	Khasiin Khulguud
	report

Selenge Press	7–2	Ulaanbaatar
	report

Mazaalai	1–1	Khasiin Khulguud
	report

Mazaalai	3–0	Ulaanbaatar
	report

Khasiin Khulguud	2–2	Ulaanbaatar
	report

=== Group C ===
Pos	Team	Pld	W	D	L	GF	GA	GD	Pts	Qualification or relegation
1	Khangarid (Q)	3	3	0	0	27	1	+26	9	Second stage
2	Kharaatsai (Q)	3	2	0	1	11	8	+3	6	Second stage
3	Baganuur (Q)	3	1	0	2	11	18	−7	3	Second stage
4	Zamyn-Üüd	3	0	0	3	1	23	−22	0	

(Q) Qualified for the phase indicated

Khangarid	6–0	Kharaatsai
	report

Khangarid	11–1	Baganuur
	report

Khangarid	10–0	Zamyn-Üüd
	report

Kharaatsai	6–2	Baganuur
	report

Kharaatsai	5–0	Zamyn-Üüd
	report

Baganuur	8–1	Zamyn-Üüd
	report

== Second stage ==
=== Group D ===
Pos	Team	Pld	W	D	L	GF	GA	GD	Pts	Qualification or relegation
1	Khoromkhon (Q)	3	3	0	0	9	1	+8	9	Final
2	Khangarid (Q)	3	2	0	1	9	4	+5	6	Third place match
3	Darkhan	3	1	0	2	3	11	−8	3	
4	Mazaalai	3	0	0	3	2	7	−5	0	

(Q) Qualified for the phase indicated

Khoromkhon	5–0	Darkhan
	report

Khoromkhon	1–0	Mazaalai
	report

Khoromkhon	3–1	Khangarid
	report

Darkhan	3–1	Mazaalai
	report

Darkhan	0–5	Khangarid
	report

Mazaalai	1–3	Khangarid
	report

=== Group E ===
Pos	Team	Pld	W	D	L	GF	GA	GD	Pts	Qualification or relegation
1	Khasiin Khulguud (Q)	3	3	0	0	6	3	+3	9	Final
2	Kharaatsai (Q)	3	2	0	1	8	6	+2	6	Third place match
3	Zamchin	3	1	0	2	6	6	0	3	
4	Selenge Press	3	0	0	3	2	7	−5	0	

(Q) Qualified for the phase indicated

Zamchin	3–1	Selenge Press
	report

Zamchin	1–2	Khasiin Khulguud
	report

Zamchin	2–3	Kharaatsai
	report

Selenge Press	0–1	Khasiin Khulguud
	report

Selenge Press	1–3	Kharaatsai
	report

Khasiin Khulguud	3–2	Kharaatsai
	report

== Playoff ==
=== Third Place ===
Khangarid	2–1	Kharaatsai
	report

=== Final ===
Khoromkhon	2–2 (a.e.t.)	Khasiin Khulguud
	report
Penalties
	2–4
