= Mönkhtogtokhyn Idersaikhan =

Mongolian footballer

Personal information
- Full name: Mönkhtogtokhyn Idersaikhan; Мөнхтогтохын Идэрсайхан
- Date of birth: December 3, 1982 (age 43)
- Place of birth: Mongolia
- Position: Midfielder

Senior career*
Years	Team	Apps	(Gls)
2005–2018	Khangarid		

International career
2003–2009	Mongolia	13	(0)
- * Club domestic league appearances and goals

Mönkhtogtokhyn Idersaikhan (Mongolian: Мөнхтогтохын Идэрсайхан; born 3 December 1982) is a Mongolian former footballer. He made his first appearance for the Mongolia national football team in 2003.
