= Dambiijavyn Terbaatar =

Mongolian footballer

Personal information
- Full name: Dambiijavyn Terbaatar; Дамбийжавын Тэрбаатар
- Date of birth: November 1, 1968 (age 57)
- Place of birth: Mongolia
- Position: Midfielder

Team information
- Current team: Khangarid

Senior career*
Years	Team	Apps	(Gls)
2005–2008	Khangarid		

International career
2000–2006	Mongolia	7	(0)
- * Club domestic league appearances and goals

Dambiijavyn Terbaatar (Mongolian: Дамбийжавын Тэрбаатар; born 1 November 1968) is a Mongolian international footballer. He made his first appearance for the Mongolia national football team in 2000.
