= Jargalsaikhan Munkhbayar =

Mongolian footballer

Personal information
- Full name: Jargalsaikhan Munkhbayar
- Date of birth: February 23, 1976 (age 50)
- Place of birth: Mongolia
- Position: Defender

Team information
- Current team: Khangarid

Senior career*
| Years | Team | Apps | (Gls) |
| 2005– | Khangarid | | |

International career
| 2005– | Mongolia | 2 | (0) |
- * Club domestic league appearances and goals

Jargalsaikhan Munkhbayar (born 23 February 1976) is a Mongolian international footballer. He made his first appearance for the Mongolia national football team in 2005.
