= Veasna =

- Gender: Male
- Language: Khmer language

Origin
- Meaning: "Future" or "destiny"

Veasna is a given name of Cambodian origin meaning "future" or “destiny”. As with most Cambodian names the family name is followed by the given name.

Veasna may refer to:

- Khem Veasna, Cambodian politician, the founder of League for Democracy Party
- Anthony Veasna So, Cambodian-American writer
- Soun Veasna, Cambodian footballer
