= Baatsuri Enkhbaatar =

Mongolian international footballer

Personal information
- Full name: Baatsuri Enkhbaatar
- Date of birth: March 30, 1985 (age 41)
- Place of birth: Mongolia
- Position: Midfielder

Team information
- Current team: Ulaanbaataryn Mazaalaynuud

Senior career*
Years	Team	Apps	(Gls)
2003–	Ulaanbaataryn Mazaalaynuud	11	(1)

International career
2003	Mongolia	3	(0)
- * Club domestic league appearances and goals

Baatsuri Enkhbaatar (born 30 March 1985) is a Mongolian international footballer. He has appeared 3 times for the Mongolia national football team.
