= Sharav =

Sharav may refer to:

== As a family name ==
- Eden Sharav (born 1992), a Scottish professional snooker player

== As a Mongolian given name ==
- Byambasuren Sharav (1952–2019), a modern Mongolian composer
- Marzan Sharav (1869–1939), a Mongolian painter

== As a Mongolian patronymic ==
- Sharav Nasanjargal (born 1968), a Mongolian international footballer
- Sharavyn Gungaadorj (born 1935), a Mongolian politician and 15th Prime Minister of Mongolia

== Other uses ==
- Khamsin, a local wind in North Africa and the Arabian Peninsula, known as sharav (שרב) in Hebrew
