= Suurisürengiin Mönkhbaatar =

Mongolian footballer

Suurisuren Munkhbaatar
Personal information
- Full name: Suurisuren Munkhbaatar
- Date of birth: 1976 (age 49–50)
- Place of birth: Mongolia
- Position: Forward

Team information
- Current team: Khangarid

Senior career*
Years	Team	Apps	(Gls)
2005–	Khangarid		

International career
2000–	Mongolia	4	(0)
- * Club domestic league appearances and goals

Suurisuren Munkhbaatar (born 1976) is a Mongolian international footballer. He made his first appearance for the Mongolia national football team in 2000.
