= Altansükhiin Erdenebayar =

Mongolian footballer

Personal information
- Full name: Altansükhiin Erdenebayar; Алтансүхийн Эрдэнэбаяр
- Date of birth: January 13, 1988 (age 38)
- Place of birth: Mongolia
- Height: 1.77 m (5 ft 10 in)
- Position: Midfielder

Team information
- Current team: Khangarid

Senior career*
Years	Team	Apps	(Gls)
2011–	Khangarid		

International career
2011–	Mongolia	1	(0)
- * Club domestic league appearances and goals

Altansükhiin Erdenebayar (Mongolian: Алтансүхийн Эрдэнэбаяр; born 13 January 1981) is a Mongolian international footballer. He made his first appearance for the Mongolia national football team in 2011.
