= 2015 Mongolian Premier League =

Football league season in Mongolia

Mongolian Premier League
- Season: 2015
- Champions: Erchim; 1st Premier League title 9th Mongolian Title
- Relegated: Soyombiin Barsuud
- 2016 AFC Cup: Erchim
- Top goalscorer: Naranbold Nyam-Osor (23 goals)
- Biggest home win: UBU 10–0 Soyombiin Barsuud
- Biggest away win: Soyombiin Barsuud 0–10 Erchim
- Highest scoring: Soyombiin Barsuud 0–10 Erchim UBU 10–0 Soyombiin Barsuud
- Longest winning run: Erchim (5 games)
- Longest unbeaten run: Erchim (6 games)
- Longest winless run: Soyombiin Barsuud (11 games)
- Longest losing run: Ulaanbaataryn Mazaalaynuud (4 games)

The 2015 Mongolian Premier League also known as the Khurkhree National Top League is the 47th edition of the tournament. Two new teams entered the competition, Deren and Soyombiin Barsuud to increase the number of teams to nine. The season started on 16 May 2015 and was ended on 26 September.

== Khurkhree National Premier League ==
The competition is to be known as the Khurkhree National Premier League for sponsorship reasons, after the Mongolian Football Federation signed a MNT 400 million sponsorship deal with Arvain Undes, a Mongolian company that produces the beer, Khurkhree. As well as the new sponsorship deal, matches will also be broadcast on NTV television and online, with the teams competing for a share of a MNT 100 million prize fund.

== Clubs ==
=== Clubs and locations ===
Location of teams in 2015 Mongolian Premier League

Club	City	Stadium	Capacity
Deren	Deren		
Erchim	Ulaanbaatar	Erchim Stadium	
Ulaanbaatar	Ulaanbaatar	MFF Football Centre	3,500
Khangarid	Erdenet	Erdenet Stadium	7,000
Khoromkhon	Ulaanbaatar	MFF Football Centre	3,500
Selenge Press	Ulaanbaatar	MFF Football Centre	3,500
Soyombiin Barsuud			
Ulaanbaataryn Mazaalaynuud	Ulaanbaatar	MFF Football Centre	3,500
Ulaanbaatar University	Ulaanbaatar	MFF Football Centre	3,500

== League table ==
Pos	Team	Pld	W	D	L	GF	GA	GD	Pts	Qualification or relegation
1	Erchim (C, Q)	16	12	1	3	62	15	+47	37	2017 AFC Cup
2	Ulaanbaatar	16	11	0	5	40	24	+16	33	
3	Selenge Press	16	10	2	4	40	19	+21	32	
4	Khoromkhon	16	9	2	5	50	28	+22	29	
5	Khangarid	16	9	1	6	46	26	+20	28	
6	Ulaanbataryn Unaganuud	16	8	2	6	49	30	+19	26	
7	Deren	16	2	3	11	24	56	−32	9	
8	Ulaanbaataryn Mazaalaynuud (O)	16	2	2	12	20	60	−40	8	Relegation Play-Off
9	Soyombiin Baarsuud (R)	16	2	1	13	9	82	−73	7	Relegation to 1st League

Updated to match(es) played on 2 September 2015. Source: RSSSF
Rules for classification: 1) points; 2) goal difference; 3) number of goals scored.
(C) Champions; (O) Play-off winners; (Q) Qualified for the phase indicated; (R) Relegated

== Results ==
=== First round ===
Home \ Away	DER	ERC	FCU	KHA	KHO	SEL	SOY	MAZ	UBU
Deren		1–7	2–4	2–6	0–4	2–1	4–0	2–2	1–2
Erchim	5–0		2–1	3–1	4–2	0–0	8–0	8–1	3–0
FC Ulaanbaatar	5–2	2–3		3–2	3–0	1–2	2–0	6–2	1–2
Khangarid	6–3	2–0	0–2		3–2	1–1	2–3	7–0	2–1
Khoromkhon	8–2	2–1	1–2	2–1		2–3	8–0	3–0	5–3
Selenge Press	2–1	0–1	2–1	1–2	2–3		5–0	4–1	3–2
Soyombiin Baarsuud	1–1	0–10	1–2	0–7	0–4	1–8		1–0	1–7
Ulaanbaataryn Mazaalaynuud	2–0	1–6	1–2	1–3	2–2	0–3	4–1		1–4
Ulaanbaatar University	1–1	2–1	2–3	2–1	2–2	1–3	10–0	8–2	

Updated to match(es) played on 2 September 2015. Source: RSSSF
Legend: Blue = home team win; Yellow = draw; Red = away team win.

== Top goalscorers ==
Rank	Player	Club	Goals
1	(Mongolia) Naranbold Nyam-Osor	Khoromkhon	23
2	(Mongolia) Tsedenbalyn Tümenjargal	UBU FC	18
3	(Mongolia) G. Batbilguun	Erchim	12
4	(Mongolia) S. Galerdene	Erchim	10
5	(Mongolia) P. Altantulga	UBU FC	9
5	(Mongolia) Bayasgalan Amarbayasgalan	FC Ulaanbaatar	9
5	(Mongolia) Tsagaantsooj Munkh-Erdene	Khangarid	9
