= 2013 Mongolian Premier League =

Football league season in Mongolia

Mongolian Premier League
- Season: 2013
- Champions: Erchim
- AFC President's Cup: Erchim
- Matches: 42
- Goals: 152 (3.62 per match)
- Highest scoring: Khangarid 7–4 Selenge Press; Erchim 9–2 Khoromkhon

The 2013 Mongolian Premier League also known as Niislel Lig or Capital League is the 46th edition of the tournament. The number of teams reduce to seven due to the withdrawal of Ulaanbaataryn Mazaalaynuud in the 2012 season. It started on 1 May and ended on 31 August 2013. Erchim won the tournament for the eighth time by beating Khangarid 4–1 in penalties. Erchim will also advance to the 2014 AFC President's Cup representing Mongolia.

== League table ==
Pos	Team	Pld	W	D	L	GF	GA	GD	Pts	Qualification
1	Erchim (C)	12	8	2	2	31	11	+20	26	Qualification for 2014 AFC President's Cup
2	Khangarid	12	5	4	3	26	22	+4	19	
3	F.C. Ulaanbaatar	12	5	2	5	21	23	−2	17	
4	Ulaanbaatar University	12	4	4	4	20	20	0	16	
5	Selenge Press	12	5	1	6	25	28	−3	16	
6	Khasiin Khulguud	12	4	3	5	17	18	−1	15	
7	Khoromkhon	12	2	2	8	23	41	−18	8	

Updated to match(es) played on 14 December 2013, 10:00. Source: soccerway.com, RSSSF
Rules for classification: 1) points; 2) goal difference; 3) number of goals scored.
(C) Champions

== Results ==
=== First round ===
Home \ Away	ERC	FCU	KHA	KKH	KHO	SEL	UUN
Erchim		3–0	2–1	1–1	0–0	2–1	3–1
F.C. Ulaanbaatar	0–3		4–2	0–0	1–2	3–2	1–4
Khangarid	1–2	2–4		0–1	2–2	7–4	1–1
Khasiin Khulguud	1–1	0–0	1–0		3–1	1–2	3–2
Khoromkhon	0–0	2–1	4–6	3–4			
Selenge Press		3–1					
Ulaanbaatar University		1–3		1–1			

Updated to match(es) played on 14 December 2013. Source: soccerway.com, RSSSF
Legend: Blue = home team win; Yellow = draw; Red = away team win.

== Final stages ==
=== Fourth place playoff match ===
25 August 2013

Selenge Press	1–3	Ulaanbaatar University
	Report

=== Semifinals ===
Team 1	Agg.	Team 2	1st leg	2nd leg
F.C. Ulaanbaatar	3–5	Khangarid	1–2	2–3

1st Leg

25 August 2013
14:30 MST

F.C. Ulaanbaatar	1–2	Khangarid
	Report

National Sports Stadium, Ulaanbaatar

2nd Leg

28 August 2013
16:00 MST

Khangarid	3–2	F.C. Ulaanbaatar
	Report

National Sports Stadium, Ulaanbaatar

Team 1	Agg.	Team 2	1st leg	2nd leg
Ulaanbaatar University	0–6	Erchim	0–2	0–4

1st Leg

27 August 2013
17:15 MST

Ulaanbaatar University	0–2	Erchim
	Report

National Sports Stadium, Ulaanbaatar

2nd Leg

29 August 2013
17:15 MST

Erchim	4–0	Ulaanbaatar University
	Report

National Sports Stadium, Ulaanbaatar

=== Third place playoff match ===
31 August 2013
11:30 MST

F.C. Ulaanbaatar	3–1	Ulaanbaatar University
	Report

National Sports Stadium, Ulaanbaatar

=== Final ===
31 August 2013
13:30 MST

Khangarid	0–0 (a.e.t.)	Erchim
	Report
Penalties
	1–4

National Sports Stadium, Ulaanbaatar
