= Moul =

Moul may refer to:

== People ==
- Alfred Moul (1852–1924), musician
- Dan Moul (born 1959), American politician
- Fred E. Moul, American politician
- Jamie Moul (born 1984), English golfer
- Maxine Moul (born 1947), American politician
- Moul Daravorn (born 1993), Cambodian football player

== Places ==
- Moul Falls, Canada

== Other ==
- MOUL or Myst Online: Uru Live, videogame
