= Bayasgalangiin Garidmagnai =

Mongolian footballer

Garidmagnai Bayasgalan
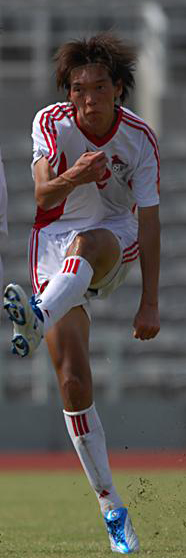

Personal information
- Full name: Bayasgalangiin Garidmagnai; Баясгалангийн Гарьдмагнай
- Date of birth: 17 September 1985 (age 41)
- Place of birth: Ulaanbaatar, Mongolia
- Height: 1.88 m (6 ft 2 in)
- Position: Midfielder

Senior career*
Years	Team	Apps	(Gls)
2003–2005	Ulaanbaataryn Mazaalaynuud	12	(3)
2007–2010	Erchim		
2009–2010	Ulaanbaataryn Mazaalaynuud		
2011	Deren FC		
2011–2012	Erbil SC	3	(0)
2012	Dalian Shide	1	(0)
2012–2013	Erchim		
2013–2014	Khoromkhon		
2015–2019	SP Falcons		
2020	BCH Lions		

International career
2003–2019	Mongolia	35	(2)

Managerial career
- 2020: BCH Lions (Player-Coach)
- 2020: Ulaanbaatar City (Assistant)
- 2020–2022: Athletic 220
- 2022–2023: Khovd
- 2022: Mongolia U17
- 2024–2026: Mongolia
- 2025–: Tuv Azarganuud
- * Club domestic league appearances and goals

Bayasgalangiin Garidmagnai (Mongolian: Баясгалангийн Гарьдмагнай; born 17 September 1985 in Ulaanbaatar) is a retired Mongolian footballer.

== International career ==
Garidmagnai made his senior international debut on 22 February 2003 in a 2003 East Asian Football Championship match again Macau. He went on to make thirty-five appearances for the team, scoring two goals, before retiring in 2019.

=== International goals ===
Scores and results list Mongolia's goal tally first.

No.	Date	Venue	Opponent	Score	Result	Competition
1.	23 June 2007	Estádio Campo Desportivo, Taipa, Macau	Guam	4–2	5–2	2008 East Asian Football Championship
2.	15 March 2011	MFF Football Centre, Ulaanbaatar, Mongolia	Philippines	2–1	2–1	2012 AFC Challenge Cup qualification
Last updated 10 February 2023

== Managerial career ==
As of December 2021, Garidmagnai is a coach and assistant Coach Education Director of the Mongolian Football Federation. He was a player-coach for BCH Lions in 2020 as the team won the Mongolian First League title. Later that year he joined Athletic 220 FC. He was named the men's team Manager of the Year by the MFF over both of the following two seasons. In July 2022 he was unveiled as the new head coach of Khovd FC of the Mongolian Premier League.

In February 2023 it was announced that Garidmagnai would travel to Qatar to begin his AFC A-badge as part of a partnership between the Mongolian Football Federation and the Qatar Football Association.

=== Honours ===
Individual

- MFF Manager of the Season: 2020, 2021
