= 2008 Mongolian Premier League =

Football league season in Mongolia

Statistics of the Mongolia Premier League for the 2008 season.

== Overview ==
Erchim won the championship.

== League standings ==
Pos	Team	Pld	W	D	L	GF	GA	GD	Pts
1	Erchim	14	13	0	1	55	19	+36	39
2	Khoromkhon	14	10	1	3	32	25	+7	31
3	Khasiin Khulguud	14	9	0	5	38	31	+7	27
4	Selenge Press	14	8	0	6	38	28	+10	24
5	Khangarid	14	5	3	6	34	33	+1	18
6	Ulaanbaatar University	14	4	1	9	40	51	−11	10 (Note: -3 points?)
7	Mazaalai	14	1	3	10	11	24	−13	9 (Note: +3 points?)
8	Kharaatsai	14	2	0	12	20	57	−37	6

Source: rsssf.com

== Playoff ==
=== Bracket ===
Semi-finals
Khoromkhon (pen.)	2 (4)
Khasiin Khulguud	2 (3)
Erchim	5
Selenge Press	1

Final
Erchim	3
Khoromkhon	1
Third-place
Khasiin Khulguud (pen.)	3 (5)
Selenge Press	3 (4)
