= 2005 Mongolian Premier League =

Football league season in Mongolia

Mongolian National Championship
- Season: 2005
- Champions: Khoromkhon

The 2005 Mongolian National Championship was the thirty-eighth recorded edition of top flight football in Mongolia and the tenth season of the Mongolian Premier League, which took over as the highest level of competition in the country from the previous Mongolian National Championship. Khoromkhon were champions, their first title, Khangarid were runners up, with Mazaalai in third place.

== Participants ==
- Darkhan
- Khangarid
- Kharaatsai
- Khoromkhon
- Mazaalai

== Format ==
The competition was played in two stages: firstly a series of first round matches of indeterminate structure. Following this, four of the five competing teams qualified for the semifinal playoffs, the winners of which advanced to a one off final, with the losers contesting a third place match.

=== Playoffs ===
Kharaatsai were eliminated in the regular stage, the other four participants proceeded to the playoff stage.

==== Bracket ====
Semi-finals
Khangarid	7
Darkhan	3
Khoromkhon	3
Mazaalai	0

Final
Mazaalai	3
Darkhan	0
Third-place
Khoromkhon	1
Khangarid	0

==== Final ====
23 July 2005

Khoromkhon	1–0	Khangarid
P. Purevsukh 18'	report
