= Tögsbileg Batbold =

Mongolian footballer

Personal information
- Full name: Batboldyn Tögsbileg; Батболдын Төгсбилэг
- Place of birth: Darkhan, Mongolia
- Position: Forward

Team information
- Current team: Erchim

Senior career*
Years	Team	Apps	(Gls)
- Erchim

International career
2013–	Mongolia	1	(0)
- * Club domestic league appearances and goals

Batboldyn Tögsbileg (Mongolian: Батболдын Төгсбилэг) is a Mongolian footballer who plays as a forward for Mongolian Premier League club Erchim and the Mongolian national team. He made his first appearance for the Mongolia national football team in 2013.
