= 2013 AFC President's Cup =

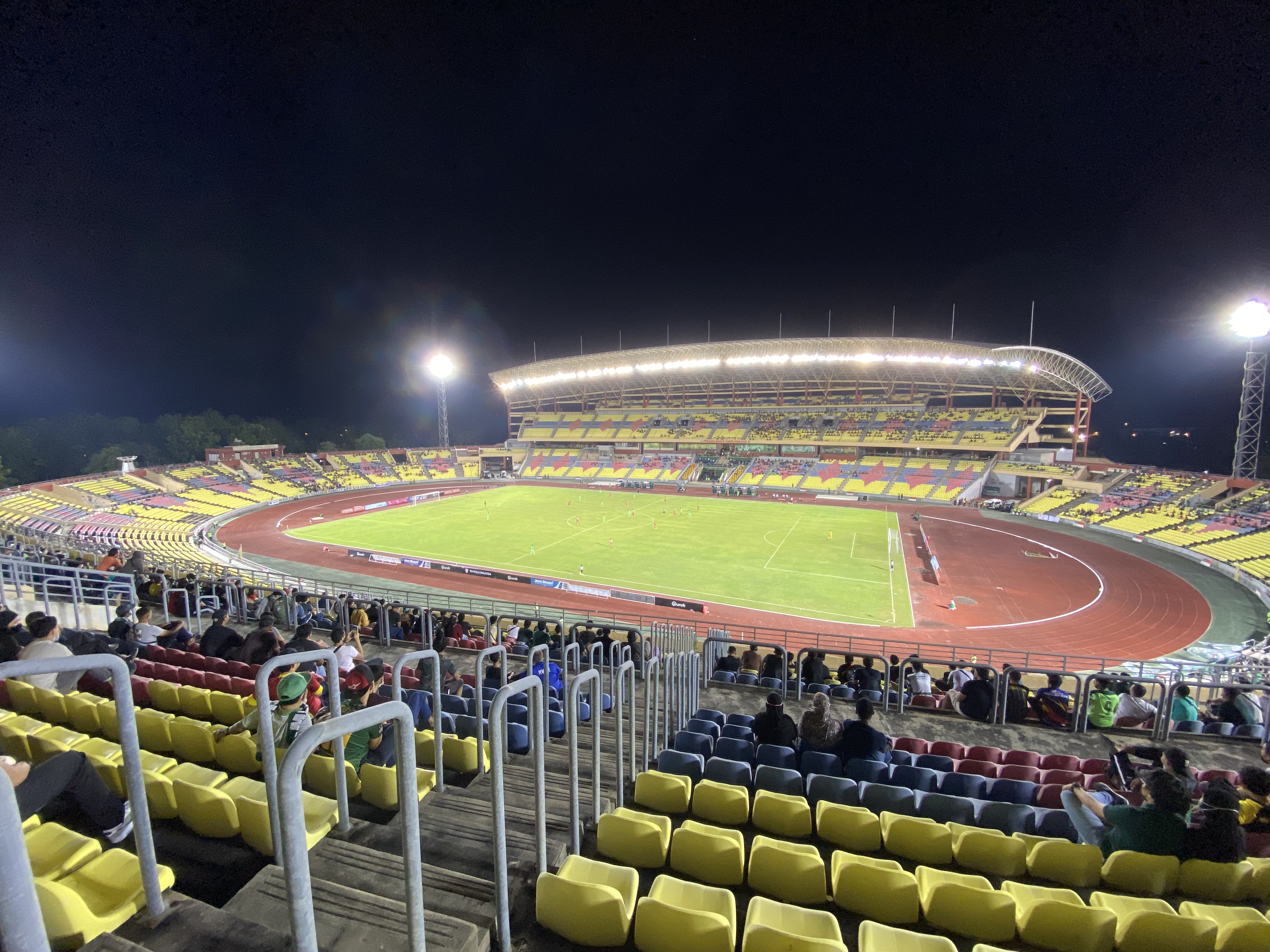
- Hang Jebat Stadium in malacca hosted the final

Tournament details
- Host country: Malaysia (final stage); Nepal, Philippines, Cambodia (group stage)
- Dates: 6–12 May 2013 (group stage); 23–29 September 2013 (final stage)
- Teams: 6 (final stage); 12 (total) (from 12 associations)

Final positions
- Champions: (Turkmenistan) Balkan (1st title)
- Runners-up: (Pakistan) KRL

Tournament statistics
- Matches played: 25
- Goals scored: 94 (3.76 per match)
- Attendance: 49,345 (1,974 per match)
- Top scorer(s): (Kyrgyzstan) Mirlan Murzaev (9 goals)
- Best player: (Turkmenistan) Amir Gurbani

The 2013 AFC President's Cup was the ninth edition of the AFC President's Cup, a football competition organized by the Asian Football Confederation (AFC) for clubs from "emerging countries" in Asia. Istiqlol were the defending champions, but did not enter the tournament as teams from Tajikistan no longer entered the AFC President's Cup.

In the final, Balkan of Turkmenistan defeated KRL of Pakistan 1–0 and became the first team from Turkmenistan to win the AFC President's Cup.

== Venues ==
Kathmandu	Cebu City	Phnom Penh	Malacca
Dasarath Rangasala Stadium	Cebu City Sports Center	Olympic Stadium	Hang Jebat Stadium
Capacity: 17,800	Capacity: 5,500	Capacity: 70,000	Capacity: 40,000

== Teams ==
Location of teams of the 2013 AFC President's Cup.
Group A (played in Nepal)
Group B (played in Philippines)
Group C (played in Cambodia)

The AFC laid out the procedure for deciding the participating associations, with the final decision to be made by the AFC in November 2012. The following changes to the list of participating associations may be made from the 2012 AFC President's Cup if the AFC approved the following applications made by any association:

- An association originally participating in the AFC President's Cup may apply to participate in the 2013 AFC Cup.
- An association originally not participating in any AFC club competitions may apply to participate in the 2013 AFC President's Cup.

The following changes in the participating associations were made compared to the previous year:

- Philippine clubs' participation in the AFC President's Cup starting from 2013 was approved by the AFC.
- Tajikistan clubs' participation was upgraded from the AFC President's Cup to the AFC Cup starting from 2013 by the AFC.

Each participating association was given one entry. The following teams entered the competition.

Association	Team	Qualifying method	App	Last App
Bangladesh	Abahani Limited Dhaka	2012 Bangladesh Football Premier League champions	5th	2011
Bhutan	Yeedzin	2012–13 Bhutan National League champions	4th	2012
Cambodia	Boeung Ket Rubber Field	2012 Cambodian League champions	1st	none
Chinese Taipei	Taiwan Power Company	2012 Intercity Football League champions	6th	2012
Kyrgyzstan	Dordoi Bishkek	2012 Kyrgyzstan League champions	8th	2012
Mongolia	Erchim	2012 Mongolia Super Cup winners	2nd	2012
Nepal	Three Star Club	2012–13 Martyr's Memorial A-Division League champions	2nd	2005
Pakistan	KRL	2012–13 Pakistan Premier League champions	3rd	2012
Palestine	Hilal Al-Quds	2011–12 West Bank Premier League champions	1st	none
Philippines	Global	2012 United Football League champions	1st	none
Sri Lanka	Sri Lanka Army	2011–12 Sri Lanka Football Premier League runners-up	2nd	2009
Turkmenistan	Balkan	2012 Ýokary Liga champions	3rd	2012

== Schedule ==
The schedule of the competition was as follows.

- Group stage: 2–12 May 2013
- Final stage: 23–29 September 2013

== Group stage ==
The draw for the group stage was held on 19 March 2013, 15:00 UTC+8, at the AFC House in Kuala Lumpur, Malaysia. The twelve teams were drawn into three groups of four. Each group was played on a single round-robin basis at a centralized venue, with Cambodia, Nepal, and the Philippines selected by the AFC to host the groups. The winners and runners-up of each group advanced to the final stage.

Tiebreakers

The teams are ranked according to points (3 points for a win, 1 point for a tie, 0 points for a loss). If tied on points, tiebreakers are applied in the following order:

1. Greater number of points obtained in the group matches between the teams concerned
2. Goal difference resulting from the group matches between the teams concerned
3. Greater number of goals scored in the group matches between the teams concerned
4. Goal difference in all the group matches
5. Greater number of goals scored in all the group matches
6. Penalty shoot-out if only two teams are involved and they are both on the field of play
7. Fewer score calculated according to the number of yellow and red cards received in the group matches (1 point for a single yellow card, 3 points for a red card as a consequence of two yellow cards, 3 points for a direct red card, 4 points for a yellow card followed by a direct red card)
8. Drawing of lots

=== Group A ===
Team	Pld	W	D	L	GF	GA	GD	Pts
(Nepal) Three Star Club	3	1	2	0	5	3	+2	5
(Mongolia) Erchim	3	1	1	1	1	2	−1	4
(Chinese Taipei) Taiwan Power Company	3	0	3	0	3	3	0	3
(Bangladesh) Abahani Limited Dhaka	3	0	2	1	2	3	−1	2

- Matches were played at Kathmandu, Nepal, from 7 to 11 May 2013 (all times UTC+5:45).
7 May 2013
15:10

Taiwan Power Company (Chinese Taipei)	0–0	(Mongolia) Erchim
	Report

Dasarath Rangasala Stadium, Kathmandu
Attendance: 1,000
Referee: Masoud Tufayelieh (Syria)
7 May 2013
18:10

Three Star Club (Nepal)	1–1	(Bangladesh) Abahani Limited Dhaka
Shrestha 15'	Report	Towhidul 38'

Dasarath Rangasala Stadium, Kathmandu
Attendance: 4,000
Referee: Ali Shaban (Kuwait)

9 May 2013
15:10

Abahani Limited Dhaka (Bangladesh)	1–1	(Chinese Taipei) Taiwan Power Company
Shakhawat 5'	Report	Hung Kai-chun 14'

Dasarath Rangasala Stadium, Kathmandu
Attendance: 600
Referee: Çarymyrat Gurbanow (Turkmenistan)
9 May 2013
18:10

Erchim (Mongolia)	0–2	(Nepal) Three Star Club
	Report	Zikahi 10'; Femi 64'

Dasarath Rangasala Stadium, Kathmandu
Attendance: 3,000
Referee: Khurram Shahzad (Pakistan)

11 May 2013
15:10

Erchim (Mongolia)	1–0	(Bangladesh) Abahani Limited Dhaka
Batbilguun 59'	Report

Dasarath Rangasala Stadium, Kathmandu
Attendance: 1,000
Referee: Ali Shaban (Kuwait)
11 May 2013
18:10

Three Star Club (Nepal)	2–2	(Chinese Taipei) Taiwan Power Company
Zikahi 7'; Budhathoki 15'	Report	Kuo Yin-hung 20'; Hung Kai-chun 45+1'

Dasarath Rangasala Stadium, Kathmandu
Attendance: 7,000
Referee: Ammar Al-Jeneibi (United Arab Emirates)

=== Group B ===
Team	Pld	W	D	L	GF	GA	GD	Pts
(Kyrgyzstan) Dordoi Bishkek	3	2	1	0	16	2	+14	7
(Pakistan) KRL	3	2	1	0	11	1	+10	7
(Philippines) Global	3	1	0	2	6	8	−2	3
(Bhutan) Yeedzin	3	0	0	3	0	22	−22	0

- Matches were played at Cebu City, Philippines, from 8 to 12 May 2013 (all times UTC+8).
8 May 2013
16:30

Dordoi Bishkek (Kyrgyzstan)	1–1	(Pakistan) KRL
Kharchenko 23'	Report	Ishaq 50' (pen.)

Cebu City Sports Complex, Cebu City
Attendance: 1,100
Referee: Nivon Robesh Gamini (Sri Lanka)
8 May 2013
19:30

Global (Philippines)	5–0	(Bhutan) Yeedzin
Reichelt 5'; De Murga 9'; Starosta 15'; Bahadoran 20'; Mw. Angeles 64'	Report

Cebu City Sports Complex, Cebu City
Attendance: 2,500
Referee: Mukhtar Al Yarimi (Yemen)

10 May 2013
16:30

Yeedzin (Bhutan)	0–9	(Kyrgyzstan) Dordoi Bishkek
	Report	Murzaev 9', 41', 50', 72', 80' (pen.); Rustamov 30', 84'; Shamshiev 54'; Kaleutin 62'

Cebu City Sports Complex, Cebu City
Attendance: 900
Referee: Mohammad Abu Loum (Jordan)
10 May 2013
19:30

KRL (Pakistan)	2–0	(Philippines) Global
Mehmood Khan 12'; Adil 77'	Report

Cebu City Sports Complex, Cebu City
Attendance: 4,352
Referee: Wang Di (China PR)

12 May 2013
16:30

KRL (Pakistan)	8–0	(Bhutan) Yeedzin
Kaleemullah 4' (pen.), 71', 75', 83', 90+1'; Abid Khan 37'; Us-Salam 44'; Saadullah 45+1'	Report

Cebu City Sports Complex, Cebu City
Attendance: 1,315
Referee: Nagor Amir Noor Mohamed (Malaysia)
12 May 2013
19:30

Global (Philippines)	1–6	(Kyrgyzstan) Dordoi Bishkek
De Murga 9'	Report	Murzaev 14', 25' (pen.), 55', 64'; Shamshiev 77'; Tetteh 90+3'

Cebu City Sports Complex, Cebu City
Attendance: 4,725
Referee: Nivon Robesh Gamini (Sri Lanka)

=== Group C ===
Team	Pld	W	D	L	GF	GA	GD	Pts
(Turkmenistan) Balkan	3	3	0	0	10	2	+8	9
(Palestine) Hilal Al-Quds	3	2	0	1	13	3	+10	6
(Cambodia) Boeung Ket Rubber Field	3	1	0	2	6	3	+3	3
Sri Lanka Army	3	0	0	3	0	21	−21	0

- Matches were played at Phnom Penh, Cambodia, from 6 to 10 May 2013 (all times UTC+7).
6 May 2013
13:00

Hilal Al-Quds (Palestine)	2–3	(Turkmenistan) Balkan
Abu Rwais 39'; Kettlun 73' (pen.)	Report	Garadanow 5'; Gurbani 79', 89'

Olympic Stadium, Phnom Penh
Attendance: 400
Referee: Yu Ming-hsun (Chinese Taipei)
6 May 2013
16:00

Boeung Ket Rubber Field (Cambodia)	6–0	Sri Lanka Army
Vathanaka 8', 27' (pen.), 61', 89'; Sokngon 72'; Sokpheng 85'	Report

Olympic Stadium, Phnom Penh
Attendance: 4,000
Referee: Mohanad Qasim Eesee Sarray (Iraq)

8 May 2013
13:00

Sri Lanka Army	0–10	(Palestine) Hilal Al-Quds
	Report	Kettlun 13' (pen.), 48' (pen.), 79'; Abu Gharqoud 35', 49'; Obaid 66'; Lafi 68', 86'; Abu Jazar 90'; Abu Rwais 90+2'

Olympic Stadium, Phnom Penh
Attendance: 700
Referee: Pratap Singh (India)
8 May 2013
16:00

Balkan (Turkmenistan)	2–0	(Cambodia) Boeung Ket Rubber Field
Garadanow 8'; Şirmedow 85'	Report

Olympic Stadium, Phnom Penh
Attendance: 5,000
Referee: Tayeb Shamsuzzaman (Bangladesh)

10 May 2013
13:00

Balkan (Turkmenistan)	5–0	Sri Lanka Army
Çoňkaýew 2'; Baýramow 13'; Şirmedow 56'; Atamämmedow 74'; Yamanalage 79' (o.g.)	Report

Olympic Stadium, Phnom Penh
Attendance: 500
Referee: Yu Ming-hsun (Chinese Taipei)
10 May 2013
16:00

Boeung Ket Rubber Field (Cambodia)	0–1	(Palestine) Hilal Al-Quds
	Report	Abu Gharqoud 87'

Olympic Stadium, Phnom Penh
Attendance: 5,500
Referee: Mohanad Qasim Eesee Sarray (Iraq)

== Final stage ==
The final stage was played at a centralized venue. The matches were played at Malacca, Malaysia, from 23 to 29 September 2013 (all times UTC+8).

The draw for the final stage was held on 31 July 2013, 15:00 UTC+8, at the AFC House in Kuala Lumpur, Malaysia. The six teams were drawn into two groups of three. Each group was played on a single round-robin basis, with the same ranking rules as the group stage. The winners of each group advanced to the final. The final was played as a single match, with extra time and penalty shoot-out used to decide the winner if necessary.

=== Group A ===
Team	Pld	W	D	L	GF	GA	GD	Pts
(Turkmenistan) Balkan	2	2	0	0	10	0	+10	6
(Mongolia) Erchim	2	0	1	1	1	5	−4	1
(Nepal) Three Star Club	2	0	1	1	1	7	−6	1

23 September 2013
16:45

Three Star Club (Nepal)	0–6	(Turkmenistan) Balkan
	Report	Tkachenko 22'; Garadanow 24'; Saparow 59'; Şirmedow 63'; Gurbani 78' (pen.); Çoňkaýew 87'

Hang Jebat Stadium, Malacca
Attendance: 156
Referee: Muhammad Taqi Aljaafari Bin Jahari (Singapore)

25 September 2013
19:45

Erchim (Mongolia)	1–1	(Nepal) Three Star Club
Battulga 8'	Report	Zikahi 90+1'

Hang Jebat Stadium, Malacca
Attendance: 245
Referee: Mohanad Qasim Eesee Sarray (Iraq)

27 September 2013
19:45

Balkan (Turkmenistan)	4–0	(Mongolia) Erchim
Saparow 59'; Gurbani 76' (pen.), 86'; Hojaahmedow 81'	Report

Hang Jebat Stadium, Malacca
Attendance: 142
Referee: Abdullah Al Hilali (Oman)

=== Group B ===
Team	Pld	W	D	L	GF	GA	GD	Pts
(Pakistan) KRL	2	2	0	0	3	0	+3	6
(Palestine) Hilal Al-Quds	2	1	0	1	3	4	−1	3
(Kyrgyzstan) Dordoi Bishkek	2	0	0	2	2	4	−2	0

23 September 2013
19:45

Dordoi Bishkek (Kyrgyzstan)	0–1	(Pakistan) KRL
	Report	Kaleemullah 76'

Hang Jebat Stadium, Malacca
Attendance: 185
Referee: Ammar Al-Jeneibi (United Arab Emirates)

25 September 2013
16:45

Hilal Al-Quds (Palestine)	3–2	(Kyrgyzstan) Dordoi Bishkek
Salhe 57'; Roma 85', 90+3'	Report	Otkeev 45+2'; Rustamov 90+1'

Hang Jebat Stadium, Malacca
Attendance: 250
Referee: Mohd Amirul Izwan Bin Yaacob (Malaysia)

27 September 2013
16:45

KRL (Pakistan)	2–0	(Palestine) Hilal Al-Quds
Kaleemullah 77'; Adil 90+3'	Report

Hang Jebat Stadium, Malacca
Attendance: 197
Referee: Muhammad Taqi Aljaafari Bin Jahari (Singapore)

=== Final ===
29 September 2013
19:45

Balkan (Turkmenistan)	1–0	(Pakistan) KRL
Gurbani 87'	Report

Hang Jebat Stadium, Malacca
Attendance: 578
Referee: Ammar Al-Jeneibi (United Arab Emirates)

== Awards ==
Award	Player	Team
Most Valuable Player	(Turkmenistan) Amir Gurbani	(Turkmenistan) Balkan
Top Goalscorer	(Kyrgyzstan) Mirlan Murzaev	(Kyrgyzstan) Dordoi Bishkek

== Top scorers ==
Rank	Player	Team	Group stage	Final stage	Total
1	(Kyrgyzstan) Mirlan Murzaev	(Kyrgyzstan) Dordoi Bishkek	9	0	9
2	(Pakistan) Kaleemullah Khan	(Pakistan) KRL	5	2	7
3	(Turkmenistan) Amir Gurbani	(Turkmenistan) Balkan	2	4	6
4	(Palestine) Roberto Kettlun	(Palestine) Hilal Al-Quds	4	0	4
4	(Cambodia) Chan Vathanaka	(Cambodia) Boeung Ket Rubber Field	4	×	4
6	(Palestine) Iyad Abu Gharqoud	(Palestine) Hilal Al-Quds	3	0	3
6	(Turkmenistan) Mämmedaly Garadanow	(Turkmenistan) Balkan	2	1	3
6	(Kyrgyzstan) Tursunali Rustamov	(Kyrgyzstan) Dordoi Bishkek	2	1	3
6	(Turkmenistan) Rahmet Şirmedow	(Turkmenistan) Balkan	2	1	3
6	(Ivory Coast) Léonce Dodoz Zikahi	(Nepal) Three Star Club	2	1	3

== See also ==
- 2013 AFC Cup
- 2013 AFC Champions League
