= Sharav Nasanjargal =

Mongolian footballer

Personal information
- Full name: Sharav Nasanjargal
- Date of birth: August 3, 1968 (age 58)
- Place of birth: Mongolia
- Position: Goalkeeper

Team information
- Current team: Khasiin Khulguud

Senior career*
Years	Team	Apps	(Gls)
2008–	Khasiin Khulguud		

International career
2007–	Mongolia	2	(0)
- * Club domestic league appearances and goals

Sharav Nasanjargal (born 3 August 1968) is a Mongolian international footballer. He made his first appearance for the Mongolia national football team in 2007.
