= Khishigdalain Battulga =

Mongolian international footballer

Personal information
- Full name: Khishigdalain Battulga; Хишигдалайн Баттулга
- Date of birth: September 3, 1974 (age 52)
- Place of birth: Mongolia
- Position: Defender

Team information
- Current team: Khangarid

Senior career*
Years	Team	Apps	(Gls)
2003–	Khangarid	11	(0)

International career
2000–	Mongolia	6	(3)
- * Club domestic league appearances and goals

Khishigdalain Battulga (Mongolian: Хишигдалайн Баттулга; born 3 September 1974) is a Mongolian international footballer. He made his first appearance for the Mongolia national football team in 2000.
