= Guulin =

Settlement in Govi-Altai Province, Mongolia

Coordinates: 46°34′02″N 97°17′25″E

Guulin (Mongolian: Гуулин, ᠭᠠᠤᠯᠢᠨ, Brass) is a settlement (Mongolian: тосгон) in the northern part of Delger sum (district) of Govi-Altai Province in western Mongolia.

Guulin is an irrigated cropping settlement a semidesert artificial oasis, 27km away from Delger sum center. It has a school and a small hospital. Guulin has a population of 900-1000

Zavkhan Gol river is about 3km Northwest from Guulin, but as river dale is approximately 40 m deep, for the irrigated fields water supply is used 22 km long irrigation channel from upper part of Zavkhan Gol river dale. Irrigated fields are located south from Guulin settlement, the irrigation net covers about 15km^{2}
