= Guulin Hydro Power Station =

Hydroelectric power plant in Delger, Govi-Altai, Mongolia

- Official name: Гуулингийн Усан цахилгаан станц
- Country: Mongolia
- Location: Delger, Govi-Altai
- Coordinates: 46.5931°N 97.2743°E
- Status: Operational
- Commission date: 1997

Power generation
- Nameplate capacity: 400 kW

The Guulin Hydro Power Station (Mongolian: Гуулингийн Усан цахилгаан станц) is a hydroelectric power station in Delger, Govi-Altai Province, Mongolia. It is the first hydroelectric power station in Mongolia.

== History ==
The power station was established in 1997 as the first hydroelectric power station in Mongolia. It was constructed with the joint venture with China.

== Technical specifications ==
The power station has an installed capacity of 400 kW. It was built along the Zavkhan River.

== See also ==
- List of power stations in Mongolia
- Energy in Mongolia
