= Amir Gurbani =

Turkmenistani footballer

Personal information
- Full name: Amir Aliýewiç Gurbani
- Date of birth: 24 October 1987 (age 39)
- Place of birth: Aşgabat, Turkmen SSR, Soviet Union
- Height: 1.78 m (5 ft 10 in)
- Position: Midfielder

Team information
- Current team: Ahal
- Number: 17

Senior career*
Years	Team	Apps	(Gls)
2005	HTTU Aşgabat		
2005	Ahal		
2006–2007	Köpetdag		
2008–2010	Aşgabat		
2010–2011	Altyn Asyr		
2011–2013	Balkan		
2014	Ahal		
2015	Balkan		
2016–2017	Altyn Asyr		
2018	Dordoi Bishkek		
2018	New Radiant		
2019	Nagaworld		
2020-	Ahal		

International career
2011–2019	Turkmenistan	6	(1)
- * Club domestic league appearances and goals

Amir Aliýewiç Gurbani (born 24 October 1987) is a Turkmen professional football player currently playing for Ahal FK in the Ýokary Liga.

== Career ==
In February 2012, passed in watching the football club Buxoro FK and even signed a long-term contract, but two months later left the club, according to Gurbani reason for his departure were family problems

In 2013 with FC Balkan he won the AFC-President´s Cup 2013 in Malaysia, received an award tournament’s eventual MVP.

In 2014 moved to FC Ahal. In 2015 returned to FC Balkan.

In 2016 Gurbani returned to Altyn Asyr FK.

In December 2017, Gurbani joined FC Dordoi Bishkek.

== National team ==
He played for the Olympic team of Turkmenistan at the Asian Games 2010 in Guangzhou.

Gurbani made his debut for the Turkmenistan senior national team in 2011, match against India at 2012 AFC Challenge Cup qualification.

== Personal life ==
Gurbani is of Iranian Turkmen origin. Son of a famous Iranian Turkmen football player of Köpetdag Aşgabat in the past Ali Gurbani.

== Achievements ==
Balkan

- AFC President's Cup: 2013
