= Soyombiin Baarsuud FC =

Association football club in Mongolia

Soyombiin Barsuud
- Full name: Soyombii Barsuud Football Club
- Founded: 2009; 16 years ago
Home colours	Away colours

Soyombiin Barsuud Football Club is a football club from Ulaanbaatar, Mongolia. They currently play in the Mongolia National Premier League, the highest level of football in Mongolia, making their debut appearance in the 2015 season. They have no professional footballers.
