= Pagamsürengiin Altantulga =

Mongolian footballer

Personal information
- Full name: Pagamsürengiin Altantulga; Пагамсүрэнгийн Алтантулга
- Date of birth: February 5, 1988 (age 38)
- Place of birth: Mongolia
- Height: 1.65 m (5 ft 5 in)
- Position: Midfielder

Team information
- Current team: Ulaanbaataryn Mazaalaynuud

Senior career*
Years	Team	Apps	(Gls)
2011–	Ulaanbaataryn Mazaalaynuud		

International career
2011	Mongolia	3	(0)
- * Club domestic league appearances and goals

Pagamsürengiin "Pati" Altantulga (Mongolian: Пагамсүрэнгийн Алтантулга; born 5 February 1988) is a Mongolian international footballer. He has appeared 3 times for the Mongolia national football team.
