= 1997 Mongolian Premier League =

Football league season in Mongolia

Mongolian National Championship
- Season: 1997
- Champions: Delger
- Matches: 42
- Goals: 185 (4.4 per match)
- Biggest home win: Erchim 13–1 Erdenet "Ninj"
- Biggest away win: Hurmastyn Ezed 0–9 Erchim
- Highest scoring: Erchim 13–1 Erdenet "Ninj"

The 1997 Mongolian National Championship was the thirtieth recorded edition of top flight football in Mongolia and the second season of the Mongolian Premier League, which took over as the highest level of competition in the country from the previous Mongolian National Championship. Delger, (Mongolian: Дэлгэр, Wide) from Delger in the sum (district) of Govi-Altai Province in western Mongolia were champions, with Erchim (the team representing Ulaanbaatar power plant) finishing as runners up, and ITR Bank in third place.

== Format ==
The competition was played in two stages: firstly a double round robin league competition where each team played the others twice on a home and away basis. Following this, four teams qualified for two-legged semi-final playoffs, the winners of which advanced to a one off final, with the losers contesting a third place match.

== Results ==
=== League table ===
Pos	Team	Pld	W	D	L	GF	GA	GD	Pts	Qualification or relegation
1	Erchim (Q)	12	8	2	2	52	15	+37	26	Play-off rounds
2	Delger (Q)	12	7	3	2	31	14	+17	24	Play-off rounds
3	ITR Bank (Q)	12	5	4	3	34	20	+14	19	Play-off rounds
4	Selenge "CBB"	12	5	4	3	28	26	+2	19	
5	Udriin Od	12	5	3	4	17	19	−2	18	
6	Hurmastyn Ezed	12	2	1	9	11	37	−26	7	
7	Erdenet "Ninj"	12	1	1	10	12	54	−42	4	

Source: RSSSF
Rules for classification: 1) points; 2) goal difference; 3) number of goals scored.
(Q) Qualified for the phase indicated

=== Results table ===
Home \ Away	DEL	ERC	ERD	HUR	ITR	SEL	UDR
Delger		2–2	2–0	6–0	1–1	2–2	1–2
Erchim	4–1		13–1	2–0	0–1	4–1	1–1
Erdenet "Ninj"	2–5	1–7		0–2	2–2	2–3	2–3
Hurmastyn Ezed	0–1	0–8	1–2		1–6	1–3	0–2
ITR Bank	1–3	2–4	9–0	3–4		2–2	1–1
Selenge "CBB"	2–2	4–3	5–0	2–2	2–4		3–2
Udriin Od	0–4	1–4	2–0	2–0	0–2	1–1	

Updated to match(es) played on the final day of the season. Source: RSSSF
Legend: Blue = home team win; Yellow = draw; Red = away team win.

NB: Note that the sources do not provide home and away fixtures, merely two separate rounds.

=== Playoffs ===
The top three teams from the league stage qualified for the playoff rounds. In addition, they were joined by a fourth team known as HET. It is not clear how they became involved at this stage from the sources available. It does not seem that HET is analogous with Hurmastyn Ezed, since these sources also provide a record of this season's cup competition which features competing teams of both names.

==== Semi-finals ====
Team 1	Agg.	Team 2	1st leg	2nd leg
Erchim	3–2	HET	1–2	2–0
Delger	4–3	ITR Bank	3–2	1–1

==== Third-place ====
ITR Bank	5–2	HET
	Report

==== Final ====
Delger	2–1	Erchim
	Report
