= Dagva Enkhtaivan =

Mongolian international footballer

Personal information
- Full name: Dagva Enkhtaivan
- Date of birth: November 26, 1982 (age 43)
- Place of birth: Mongolia
- Position: Forward

Team information
- Current team: Khasiin Khulguud

Senior career*
Years	Team	Apps	(Gls)
2006–2013	Khasiin Khulguud		(26+)

International career
2007	Mongolia	3	(0)
- * Club domestic league appearances and goals

Dagva Enkhtaivan (born 26 November 1982) is a Mongolian former footballer. He made his first appearance for the Mongolia national football team in 2007.
