= 2001 Mongolian Premier League =

Football league season in Mongolia

Mongolian National Championship
- Season: 2001
- Champions: Khangarid

The 2001 Mongolian National Championship was the thirty-fourth recorded edition of top flight football in Mongolia and the sixth season of the Mongolian Premier League, which took over as the highest level of competition in the country from the previous Mongolian National Championship. Khangarid from Erdenet were champions, their first title and the first time the new league had been won by a team from outside Ulaanbaatar, Mon-Uran were runners up, with Sonor in third place.
