= 2012 Mongolian Premier League =

Football league season in Mongolia

Mongolian Premier League
- Season: 2012
- Champions: Erchim
- AFC President's Cup: Erchim
- Top goalscorer: Tsedenbalyn Tümenjargal (15 goals)

Statistics of Niislel Lig in the 2012 season. The title was won by Erchim which was their seventh title.

== League standings ==
All the teams played each other twice. the team which had the most points in two rounds became the winner.

Pos	Team	Pld	W	D	L	GF	GA	GD	Pts
1	Erchim (C)	12	8	3	1	35	11	+24	27
2	Khoromkhon	12	7	3	2	25	14	+11	24
3	Ulaanbaatar University	12	7	2	3	38	25	+13	23
4	Khasiin Khulguud	12	5	1	6	29	24	+5	16
5	Khangarid	12	5	1	6	21	23	−2	16
6	FC Ulaanbaatar	12	4	0	8	17	32	−15	12
7	Selenge Press	12	1	0	11	18	54	−36	3
8	Ulaanbaataryn Mazaalaynuud	0	0	0	0	0	0	0	0 (Note: Ulaanbaataryn Mazaalaynuud withdrew after the first half of the season (completing seven matches), all results annulled.)

Source: rsssf.com
(C) Champions

== Mongolian Football Federation Cup ==
Ten teams participated in the 2012 Mongolian Football Federation Cup. The final was played on 15 September 2012. Erchim defeated Khasiin Khulguud in a penalty shoot-out, after the match ended in extra time with a 1–1 draw.

== Super Cup ==
The 2012 Super Cup was played on 30 September 2012 between the league winner Erchim and the cup runner-up Khasiin Khulguud. It is usually played between the winners of the Niislel League and the Mongolian Football Federation Cup, but Erchim won both titles this year. Erchim defeated Khasiin Khulguud 7–2. As the winner of the Super Cup, they will participate in the 2013 AFC President's Cup representing Mongolia.
