= 1998 Mongolian Premier League =

Football league season in Mongolia

Mongolian National Championship
- Season: 1998
- Champions: Erchim

The 1998 Mongolian National Championship was the thirty-first recorded edition of top flight football in Mongolia and the third season of the Mongolian Premier League, which took over as the highest level of competition in the country from the previous Mongolian National Championship. Erchim were champions, their second title, Delger, (Mongolian: Дэлгэр, Wide) from Delger in the sum (district) of Govi-Altai Province in western Mongolia were runners up, with Dinozavr in third place.
