= 1999 Mongolian Premier League =

Football league season in Mongolia

Mongolian National Championship
- Season: 1999
- Champions: ITI Bank-Bars

The 1999 Mongolian National Championship was the thirty-second recorded edition of top flight football in Mongolia and the fourth season of the Mongolian Premier League, which took over as the highest level of competition in the country from the previous Mongolian National Championship. ITI Bank-Bars were champions, their first (and to date only) title, Erchim were runners up, with Bajangol in third place.
