= 2002 Mongolian Premier League =

Football league season in Mongolia

Mongolian National Championship
- Season: 2002
- Champions: Erchim

The 2002 Mongolian National Championship was the thirty-fifth recorded edition of top flight football in Mongolia and the seventh season of the Mongolian Premier League, which took over as the highest level of competition in the country from the previous Mongolian National Championship. Erchim, their fourth title, Khangarid from Erdenet were runners up, with Mon-Uran and Darkhan tied for third place.
