= Tsetsenbaataryn Darambayar =

Mongolian international footballer

Personal information
- Full name: Tsetsenbaataryn Darambayar; Цэцэнбаатарын Дарамбаяр
- Date of birth: August 8, 1992 (age 34)
- Place of birth: Ulaanbaatar, Mongolia
- Height: 1.80 m (5 ft 11 in)
- Position: Defender

Team information
- Current team: Khoromkhon
- Number: 23

Senior career*
Years	Team	Apps	(Gls)
1999–present	Khoromkhon		

International career
2013–	Mongolia	1	(0)
- * Club domestic league appearances and goals

Tsetsenbaataryn Darambayar (Mongolian: Цэцэнбаатарын Дарамбаяр; born 8 August 1992) is a Mongolian international footballer. He made his first appearance for the Mongolia national football team in 2013.
