= Gahrymanberdi Çoňkaýew =

Turkmen footballer

Personal information
- Date of birth: October 19, 1983 (age 43)
- Place of birth: Ýasmansalyk, Turkmen SSR, Soviet Union (now Aşgabat, Turkmenistan)
- Height: 1.84 m (6 ft 1/2 in)
- Position: Striker

Team information
- Current team: FK Köpetdag Aşgabat (assistant)

Senior career*
Years	Team	Apps	(Gls)
2002–2003	Galkan Asgabat		
2004	HTTU Aşgabat		
2005	Gazçy Gazojak		
2006–2010	Okzhetpes	31	(11)
2011	Altyn Asyr		
2011–2012	HTTU Aşgabat		
2012–2013	Balkan		
2014	Ahal		
2015	Şagadam		
2019	Köpetdag Aşgabat		
2019	Aşgabat		

International career^{‡}
2004–2013	Turkmenistan	23	(5)

Managerial career
- 2025–: FK Köpetdag Aşgabat (assistant)
- * Club domestic league appearances and goals as of 1 March 2017 ‡ National team caps and goals as of 1 March 2017

Gahrymanberdi Ovezliyevich Chonkayev (Turkmen: Gahrymanberdi Öwezliýewiç Çoňkaýew; born October 19, 1983) is a professional Turkmen football coach and former football striker.

== Club career ==
In 2013 with FC Balkan he won the 2013 AFC President's Cup in Malaysia.

In the summer of 2019, he signed a contract with FC Aşgabat.

== Coach career ==
Since 2025, he has served as an assistant coach of the Ýokary Liga club FK Köpetdag Aşgabat.

== Career statistics ==
=== International ===
Turkmenistan national team
Year	Apps	Goals
2004	2	0
2005	0	0
2006	0	0
2007	0	0
2008	7	0
2009	3	1
2010	0	0
2011	5	2
2012	4	2
2013	2	0
Total	23	5

Statistics accurate as of match played 26 March 2013

=== International goals ===
#	Date	Venue	Opponent	Score	Result	Competition	Ref.
1.	16 April 2009	Rasmee Dhandu Stadium, Malé	Bhutan	2–0	7–0	2010 AFC Challenge Cup qualifier	
2.	25 March 2011	MBPJ Stadium, Petaling Jaya	India	1–0	1–1	2012 AFC Challenge Cup qualifier	
3.	28 July 2011	Gelora Bung Karno Stadium, Jakarta	Indonesia	3–4	3–4	2014 FIFA World Cup qualifier	
4.	8 March 2012	Dasarath Rangasala Stadium, Kathmandu|	Maldives	2–1	3–1	2012 AFC Challenge Cup	
5.	16 March 2012	Dasarath Rangasala Stadium, Kathmandu	Philippines	2–1	2–1	2012 AFC Challenge Cup	

== Honours ==
Balkan

- AFC President's Cup (1): 2013

Ahal

- Turkmenistan Super Cup (1): 2014
