= Tseveensürengiin Ganbayar =

Mongolian footballer

Personal information
- Full name: Tseveensürengiin Ganbayar; Цэвээнсүрэнгийн Ганбаяр
- Date of birth: June 2, 1991 (age 35)
- Place of birth: Mongolia
- Position: Goalkeeper

Team information
- Current team: Ulaanbaatar University

Senior career*
Years	Team	Apps	(Gls)
2011–	Ulaanbaatar University		

International career
2011	Mongolia	4	(0)
- * Club domestic league appearances and goals

Tseveensürengiin Ganbayar (Mongolian: Цэвээнсүрэнгийн Ганбаяр; born 2 June 1991) is a Mongolian international footballer. He has appeared 4 times for the Mongolia national football team.
