= 2000 Mongolian Premier League =

Football league season in Mongolia

Mongolian National Championship
- Season: 2000
- Champions: Erchim

The 2000 Mongolian National Championship was the thirty-third recorded edition of top flight football in Mongolia and the fifth season of the Mongolian Premier League, which took over as the highest level of competition in the country from the previous Mongolian National Championship. Erchim were champions, their first (and to date only) title, Sonor were runners up, with Bajangol in third place.
