= Abdullah Al-Saidawi =

Palestinian association football goalkeeper

Abdullah Saidawi عبدالله الصيداوي
Personal information
- Date of birth: 4 August 1979 (age 47)
- Place of birth: Palestine
- Height: 1.88 m (6 ft 2 in)
- Position: Goalkeeper

Senior career*
Years	Team	Apps	(Gls)
–2007	Jabal Al-Mokaber	?	(0)
2007–2012	Hilal Al-Quds		(0)
2012–2016	Al-Am'ary		(0)

International career
2004–2011	Palestine	14	(0)
- * Club domestic league appearances and goals

Abdullah Saidawi (Arabic: عبدالله الصيداوي) (born 4 August 1979) is a Palestinian footballer. He plays the goalkeeper position for Palestine national football team and Ramallah-based Al-Am'ary in the West Bank Premier League.

== Career statistics ==
=== International ===
Appearances and goals by national team and year
National team	Year	Apps	Goals
Palestine	2004	1	0
Palestine	2005	–	
Palestine	2006	–	
Palestine	2007	–	
Palestine	2008	–	
Palestine	2009	1	0
Palestine	2010	1	0
Palestine	2011	11	0
Total		14	0
