= 1996 Mongolian Premier League =

Football league season in Mongolia

Mongolian National Championship
- Season: 1996
- Champions: Erchim

The 1996 Mongolian National Championship was the twenty-ninth recorded edition of top flight football in Mongolia and the first season of the Mongolian Premier League, which took over as the highest level of competition in the country from the previous Mongolian National Championship. Erchim were champions, with Biznesijn Cengeruud (also known simply as Business) finishing as runners up, with Tasyn Suudal in third place.
