= Ma'aly Kaware =

Palestinian footballer (born 1983)

Ma'aly Kaware (born 11 March 1983) is a retired Palestinian footballer who played primarily as a defensive midfielder in the West Bank League and for the Palestine national team.
