= Mahmadali Sodikov =

Tajikistani footballer

Mahmadli Sodikov
Personal information
- Date of birth: 20 March 1984 (age 42)
- Place of birth: Tajik SSR
- Position: Forward

Team information
- Current team: Khayr Vahdat

Senior career*
Years	Team	Apps	(Gls)
2008–2009	Khujand		
2010	Vakhsh Qurghonteppa		
2011–2012	Istiklol		
2013	Khujand		
2014–2016	Khayr Vahdat		
2017–	CSKA Pamir Dushanbe		

International career^{‡}
2006–	Tajikistan	21	(0)
- * Club domestic league appearances and goals as of 7 January 2015 ‡ National team caps and goals as of 7 January 2015

Mahmadali Sodikov (born 20 March 1984) is a Tajikistani footballer who plays as a forward for CSKA Pamir Dushanbe and the Tajikistan national football team.

== Career statistics ==
=== Club ===
Club	Season	League			National Cup		Continental		Other		Total	
Club	Season	Division	Apps	Goals	Apps	Goals	Apps	Goals	Apps	Goals	Apps	Goals
Khayr Vahdat	2014	Tajik League	15	0			–		–		15	0
Khayr Vahdat	Total		15	0	0	0	0	0	0	0	15	0
Career total			15	0	0	0	0	0	0	0	15	0

=== International ===
Tajikistan football team
Year	Apps	Goals
2006	2	0
2007	0	0
2008	0	0
2009	0	0
2010	1	0
2011	10	0
2012	6	0
2013	2	0
Total	21	0

Statistics accurate as of match played 21 March 2013

== Honors ==
Khujand

- Tajik Cup (1): 2008

Istiklol

- Tajik League (1): 2011
- AFC President's Cup (1): 2012
