= Olzvoin Ochbayar =

Mongolian footballer

Personal information
- Full name: Olzvoin Ochbayar; Олзвойн Очбаяр
- Date of birth: April 26, 1989 (age 37)
- Place of birth: Mongolia
- Position: Defender

Team information
- Current team: Ulaanbaatar University

Senior career*
Years	Team	Apps	(Gls)
2011–	Ulaanbaatar University		

International career
2011–	Mongolia	4	(0)
- * Club domestic league appearances and goals

Olzvoin Ochbayar (Mongolian: Олзвойн Очбаяр; born 26 April 1989) is a Mongolian international footballer. He has appeared 4 times for the Mongolia national football team.
