= Shakil Ahmed (footballer, born 1988) =

Bangladeshi footballer

Personal information
- Full name: Shakil Ahmed
- Date of birth: 7 January 1988 (age 38)
- Place of birth: Pirojpur, Bangladesh
- Height: 1.67 m (5 ft 5 1/2 in)
- Position: Midfielder

Senior career*
Years	Team	Apps	(Gls)
2007–2009	Brothers Union		
2009–2010	Mohammedan SC		
2010–2011	Sheikh Jamal DC		
2011–2012	Muktijoddha Sangsad		
2012–2013	Mohammedan SC	16	(?)
2013–2016	Sheikh Russel KC		
2017–2018	Mohammedan SC	3	(0)
2019	Brothers Union	6	(0)

International career^{‡}
2011–2013	Bangladesh	15	(1)
Medal record
Representing Bangladesh U-23
South Asian Games
Gold medal – first place	2010
- * Club domestic league appearances and goals as of 2 August 2019 ‡ National team caps and goals as of 6 March 2013

Shakil Ahmed (born 7 January 1988) is a retired Bangladeshi footballer who last played as a midfielder for Sheikh Russel KC and the Bangladesh national team. He made his international debut in 2011. His brother Zahid Hasan Ameli was also a Bangladesh national team player

== International goals ==
Scores and results list Bangladesh's goal tally first.

#	Date	Venue	Opponent	Score	Result	Competition
1.	23 March 2011	Yangon, Myanmar	Myanmar	1–0	2–0	2012 AFC Challenge Cup qualification
