= Ahmed Salama (Palestinian footballer) =

Palestinian footballer

Personal information
- Full name: Ahmed Salama
- Date of birth: November 7, 1989 (age 36)
- Place of birth: Ramallah
- Position: Defender

Senior career*
Years	Team	Apps	(Gls)
2011–	Shabab Al-Amari		

International career^{‡}
2012–	Palestine	6	(0)
- * Club domestic league appearances and goals ‡ National team caps and goals as of 16 March 2013

Ahmed Salama is a Palestinian footballer who plays as a defender.
