= Delger, Govi-Altai =

District in Govi-Altai Province, Mongolia

Coordinates: 46°21′08″N 97°22′17″E

Delger District Дэлгэр сум ᠳᠡᠯᠭᠡᠷᠰᠤᠮᠤ
- District
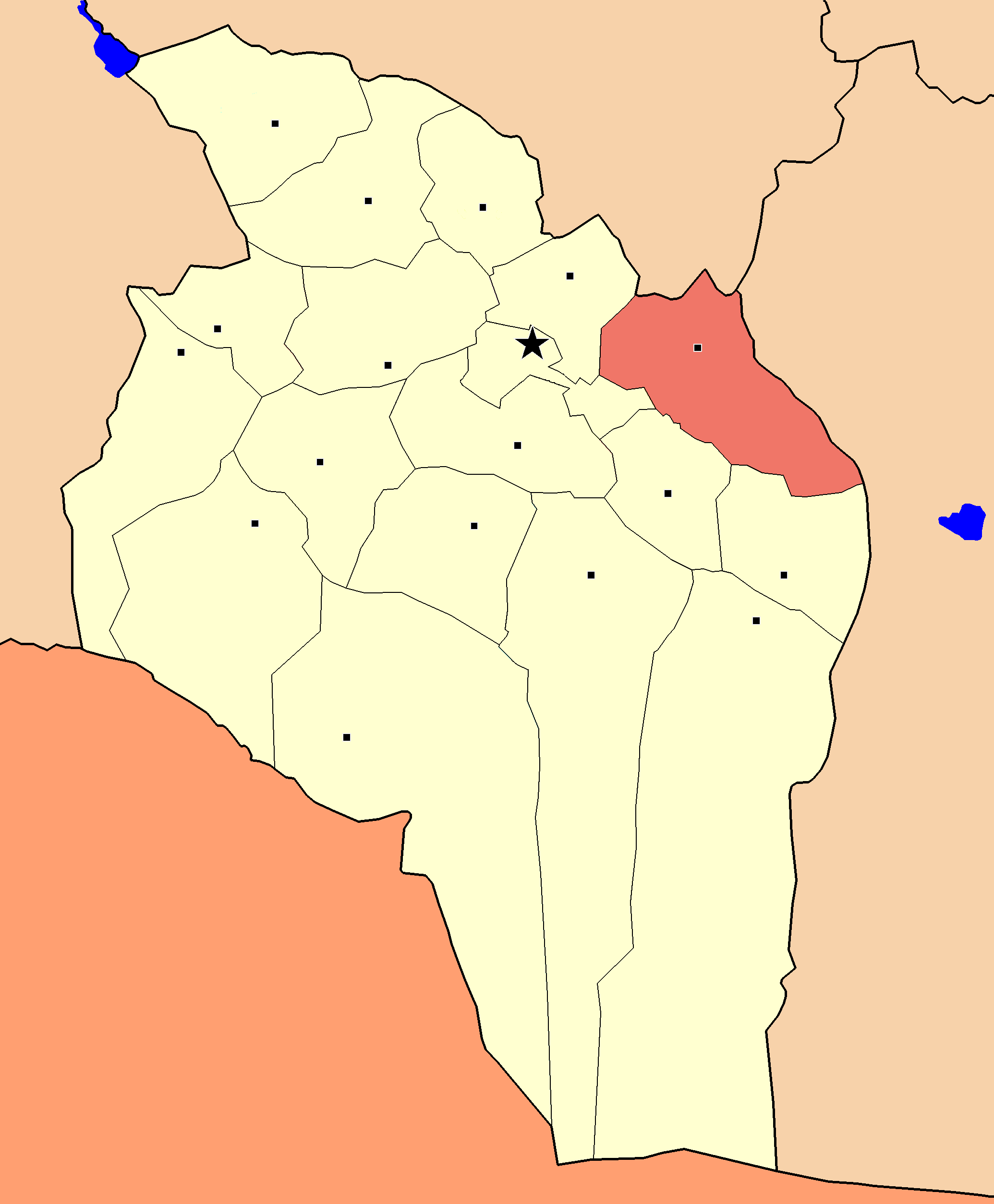
- Delger District in Govi-Altai Province
- Country: Mongolia
- Province: Govi-Altai Province

Area
  - Total: 6,625 km^{2} (2,558 sq mi)
- Time zone: UTC+8 (UTC + 8)

Delger (Mongolian: Дэлгэр, Wide) is a sum (district) of Govi-Altai Province in western Mongolia. In the northern part of the sum lies the settlement of Guulin. In 2009, its population was 3,104.

== Administrative divisions ==
The district is divided into fivebags, which are:

- Bayan-Undur
- Bayanbuural
- Bayankhongor
- Bayansan
- Guulin

== Infrastructure ==
- Guulin Hydro Power Station
