= Moul Daravorn =

Cambodian footballer

Personal information
- Full name: Moul Daravorn
- Date of birth: May 27, 1993 (age 33)
- Place of birth: Phnom Penh, Cambodia
- Height: 1.80 m (5 ft 11 in)
- Position: Defender

Senior career*
Years	Team	Apps	(Gls)
2011–2015	Svay Rieng		
2015–2018	Electricite du Cambodge		

International career^{‡}
2014–2015	Cambodia	4	(0)
- * Club domestic league appearances and goals ‡ National team caps and goals as of March 17, 2015

Moul Daravorn (born 27 May 1993) is a former Cambodian footballer who played as a defender. He was a member of Cambodia national football team.
