= Soun Veasna =

Cambodian footballer

Personal information
- Date of birth: March 27, 1994 (age 32)
- Place of birth: Cambodia
- Position: Midfielder

Team information
- Current team: Electricite du Cambodge
- Number: 6

Senior career*
Years	Team	Apps	(Gls)
2010–2016	Svay Rieng		
2016–	Electricite du Cambodge		

International career
2011–	Cambodia	9	(0)
- * Club domestic league appearances and goals

Soun Veasna (born March 27, 1994) is a footballer for Electricite du Cambodge in the Cambodian League.

He has represented Cambodia at senior international level.

== Honours ==
Svay Rieng

- Cambodian League: 2013
- Hun Sen Cup: 2011, 2012, 2015
