= Zorigtyn Battulga =

Mongolian international footballer

Personal information
- Full name: Zorigtyn Battulga; Зоригтын Баттулга
- Date of birth: September 17, 1986 (age 40)
- Place of birth: Mongolia
- Position: Forward

Team information
- Current team: Erchim

International career
Years	Team	Apps	(Gls)
2007–2011	Mongolia	10	(0)

Managerial career
- 2015–: Erchim FC
- 2016: Mongolia
- 2017–: Mongolia U-20

Zorigtyn Battulga (Mongolian: Зоригтын Баттулга; born 19 September 1986) is a Mongolian international footballer. He made his first appearance for the Mongolia national football team in 2007.
