= Erchim FC =

Association football club in Mongolia

Erchim
- Full name: Erchim Football Club
- Nicknames: The Lightnings; The horizontal tricolour
- Founded: 1994; 32 years ago
- Ground: MFF Football Centre
- Capacity: 5,000
- Chairman: Amarbayasgalan Meeren
- League: Mongolian First League
- 2024–25: Mongolian Premier League, Withdrew
Home colours	Away colours

Erchim Football Club (Mongolian: "Эрчим" Хөлбөмбөгийн Клуб) is a professional football club from Ulaanbaatar, Mongolia currently competing in the Mongolian First League. The club is one of the most successful in Mongolia's history, winning the Mongolian Premier League ten times. since its inaugural year in 1996.

The Mongolian Football Federation applied to enter the 2012 AFC President's Cup, and by winning the 2012 Super Cup, Erchim was awarded the place. In 2017, Erchim qualified for the AFC Cup, becoming the first Mongolian club to do so. 2,850 people attended their AFC Cup match against Kigwancha Sports Club. The game took place at the 5,000-capacity MFF Football Centre. While most of other Ulaanbaatar clubs share the MFF Football Centre, Erchim was the first one to have its own stadium. In 2020 the club merged with Khaan Khuns Titem to establish Khaan Khuns - Erchim FC. Their place for the 2025–26 Mongolian Premier League was taken by Ulaangom City FC.

== History ==
=== Domestic ===
Season	League									Domestic cup	Top goalscorer		Manager
Season	Div.	Pos.	Pl.	W	D	L	GS	GA	P	Domestic cup	Name	League	Manager
2011	1st	5th	14	6	3	5	23	20	21	—			
2012	1st	1st	12	8	3	1	35	11	27	—			
2013	1st	1st	12	8	2	2	31	11	26	—			
2014	1st	2nd	12	8	4	0	34	10	28	—			
2015	1st	1st	16	12	1	3	62	15	37	—	Batbilguun G.	12	
2016	1st	1st	18	17	0	1	70	12	51	1st Round			Battulga Zorigt
2017	1st	1st	18	13	3	2	47	15	42	Semi-finals			
2018	1st	1st	18	12	5	1	52	17	41	Semi-finals			
2019	1st	2nd	22	15	3	4	65	28	48	Winners			
2020	1st	4th	18	11	2	5	64	20	35				
2021	1st	5th	18	9	3	6	33	19	30				
2022	1st	6th	18	14	2	2	63	15	44				

=== Continental ===
Season	Competition	Round	Club	Home	Away	Position
2012	AFC President's Cup	Group stage	(Pakistan) KRL	0–0		3rd
2012	AFC President's Cup	Group stage	(Chinese Taipei) Taipower FC	0–1		3rd
2013	AFC President's Cup	Group stage	(Chinese Taipei) Taipower FC	0–0		2nd
2013	AFC President's Cup	Group stage	(Nepal) Three Star Club	0–2		2nd
2013	AFC President's Cup	Group stage	(Bangladesh) Abahani Limited Dhaka	1–0		2nd
2013	AFC President's Cup	Final stage	(Nepal) Three Star Club	1–1		2nd
2013	AFC President's Cup	Final stage	(Turkmenistan) Balkan	0–4		2nd
2014	AFC President's Cup	Group stage	(Cambodia) Svay Rieng	3–1		2nd
2014	AFC President's Cup	Group stage	(Nepal) MMC	0–0		2nd
2014	AFC President's Cup	Final stage	(Bangladesh) Sheikh Russel	0–1		3rd
2014	AFC President's Cup	Final stage	(North Korea) Rimyongsu	0–5		3rd
2017	AFC Cup	Qualifying round	(Cambodia) Nagaworld FC	1–0		2nd
2017	AFC Cup	Qualifying round	(Nepal) Three Star Club	0–2		2nd
2017	AFC Cup	Group Stage	(North Korea) April 25	0–5	0–6	3rd
2017	AFC Cup	Group Stage	(North Korea) Kigwancha	0–3	0–7	3rd
2018	AFC Cup	Qualifying play-off round	(North Korea) Hwaebul	0–4	0–3	0–7
2019	AFC Cup	Qualifying preliminary round	(North Korea) Ryomyong	0–3	0–3	0–6

== Honours ==
- Mongolian Premier League (13);
  - Winner: 1996, 1998, 2000, 2002, 2007, 2008, 2012, 2013, 2015, 2016, 2017, 2018, 2022
  - Runners-up: 1997, 1999, 2009, 2014, 2019
- Mongolia Cup: (8)
  - Winners: 1996, 1997, 1999, 2000, 2011, 2012, 2015, 2019
  - Runners-up: 2001, 2002, 2014
- Mongolia Super Cup (9):
  - Winners: 2011, 2012, 2013, 2014, 2016, 2017, 2019, 2020, 2022
