= Khasiin Khulguud FC =

Association football club in Mongolia

Khasiin Khulguud
- Full name: Khasyn Khuleguud Klub
- Founded: 2006; 20 years ago
- Ground: MFF Football Centre, Ulaanbaatar
- Capacity: 3500
- Chairman: B. Erkin
- Manager: Ts. Enkhter
- League: Mongolian Premier League
- 2011 MPL: 4th

Khasiin Khulguud Football Club is a Mongolian football club from Ulaanbaatar, competing in the Mongolia Premier League.

== Honours ==
- Mongolian Premier League: (1)
  - Winner : 2006

Note: the 2006 championship was not held as a normal league but in two stages of four groups due to reconstruction of the only football field in Mongolia and therefore does not count as an official MFF League championship according to sources.
