= Khangarid FC =

Association football club in Mongolia

Khangarid
- Full name: Khangarid Football Club
- Nicknames: Erdenets; Garudas
- Founded: 1996; 30 years ago
- Ground: Erdenet Stadium
- Capacity: 3,000
- Chairman: Tuguldur Batbileg.
- Manager: Amarbat Darikhuu.
- League: Mongolian Premier League
- 2025–26: MPL, 4th
- Website: https://khangaridfc.mn/
Home colours	Away colours

Khangarid Football Club is a Mongolian professional football club based in Erdenet that currently competes in the Mongolian Premier League.

== History ==
Khangarid is owned by the Erdenet Mining Corporation. The company created Khangarid as Mongolia's first unified sports club in 1990 and maintains its own football field as part of its sports facilities. The club has participated in the national football league since its inception.

== Continental record ==
Scores list Khangarid ’s goal tally first.

Season	Competition	Round	Opponent	Home	Away	Aggregate
2025–26	AFC Challenge League	Preliminary stage	(Chinese Taipei) Tainan City	1-4		

== Honours ==
- Mongolian Premier League
  - Winners (4): 2001, 2003, 2004, 2010
  - Runners-up (5): 2002, 2005, 2007, 2013, 2024–25
  - Third place (2): 2014, 2019
- Mongolia Cup
  - Winners (6): 2002, 2003, 2004, 2007, 2013, 2016
  - Runners-up (2): 2008, 2014
