= Ulaanbaataryn Mazaalaynuud FC =

Mongolian association football club

Ulaanbaataryn Mazaalainuud
- Full name: Ulaanbaataryn Mazaalainuud
- Nickname(s): Mazaalainuud (The Gobi Bears)
- Founded: 1998; 27 years ago
- Ground: MFF Football Centre
- Capacity: 5,000
- Owner: Nepko Bat-Erdeniin Batbayar
- Manager: T. Enkhboldbaatar
- League: Mongolian Premier League
- 2020: 9th, Premier League
Home colours	Away colours

Ulaanbaataryn Mazaalainuud Football Club is a Mongolian professional football club from Ulaanbaatar. They compete in the Mongolian Premier League.
