= Mongolia national football team results =

Mongolia national football team

The Mongolia national football team represents Mongolia in international football under the control of the Mongolian Football Federation (MFF). Founded in 1959, the federation was inactive between 1961 and 1997 and the men's national team did not feature in any international fixtures during that time. The federation was reorganised in 1997 and joined the AFC the same year. In 1998 the federation became a full member of FIFA, the international governing body for the sport. The MFF joined the EAFF as one of eight founding members in May 2002. Because of the harsh climate and a lack of suitable venues, the team has hosted few home matches in the past. However, in 2002 the MFF, with assistance from FIFA, began developing facilities in the country, including the creation of the 5,000-seat MFF Football Centre, which will allow the team to play more matches in Mongolia. About Mongolia's relatively low number of matches played, former national team player and coach Zorigtyn Battulga said, "Lack of games is a problem. No one will come to Mongolia in December and for us to fly to other countries is very expensive so it's hard to arrange official matches."

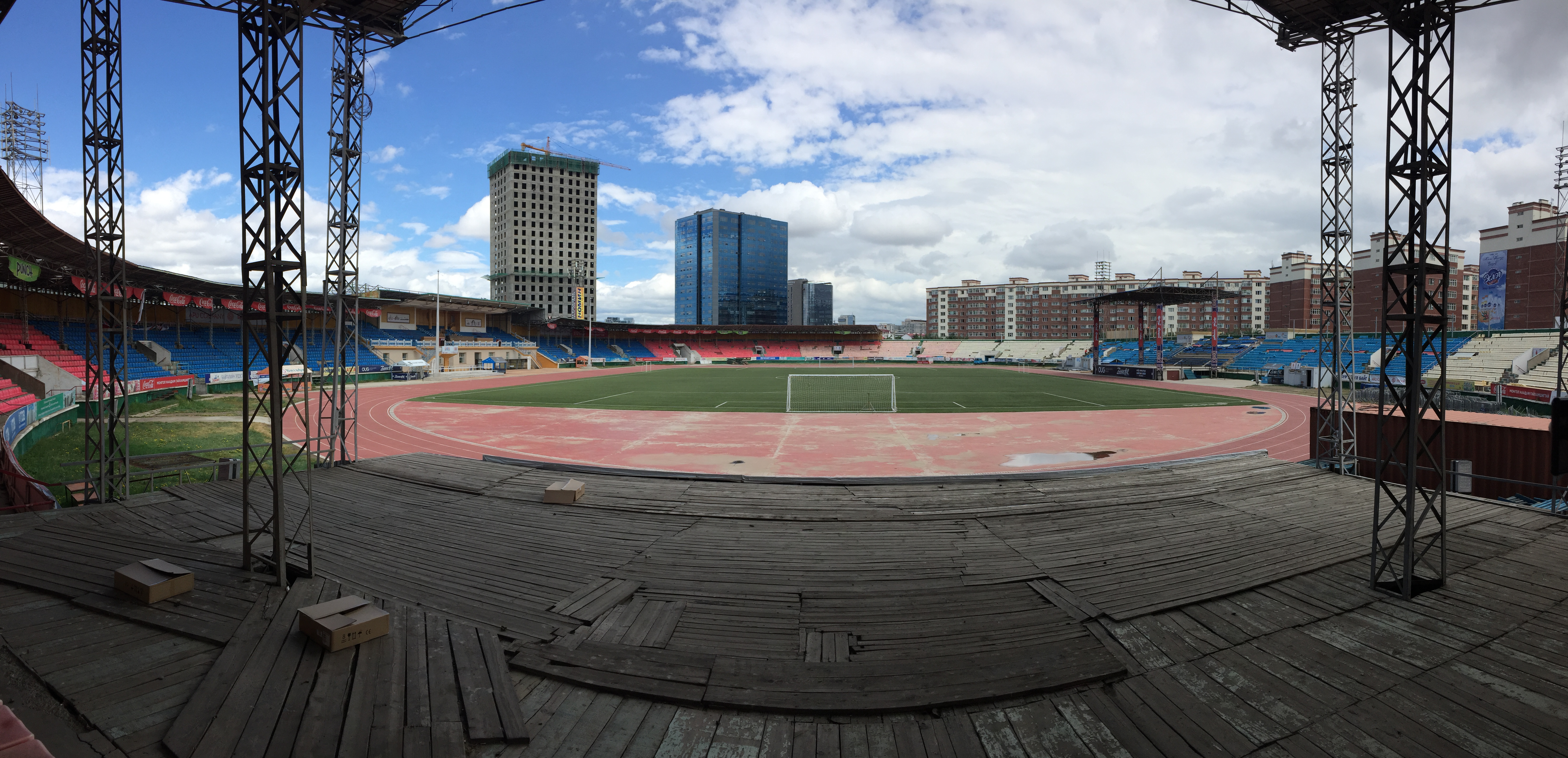
The National Sports Stadium was Mongolia's home stadium until the MFF Football Centre was constructed.

After the MFF was formed, the men's national team competed in a tournament in Hanoi, North Vietnam which included the national teams of only communist states in Asia. Mongolia competed against China, North Korea, and North Vietnam, losing all three matches by a combined score of 3 to 19. Mongolia competed at the East Asian Games in 1993, 1997, and 2001. Although the tournament was meant to be competed among under-23 teams, Mongolia, Guam, and Macau were permitted to enter their full national teams in 2001. Some evidence suggests that Mongolia was also permitted to enter its full national team in 1993 also but sources indicate that only North Korea fielded a team without age restrictions. If the full national team competed in 1993, they recorded the team's first ever victory, either before or after FIFA membership, with a 4–3 win over Macau on 18 May.

The Mongolia national team has historically competed only in official competitions such as the EAFF East Asian Championship, AFC Asian Cup qualification, and FIFA World Cup qualification since becoming members of FIFA. The MFF was suspended by the EAFF from January 2011 to March 2014 and was therefore unable to compete in the 2013 EAFF East Asian Cup. Between February 2000 and October 2017, the team played only one FIFA international friendly. The match was a 1–8 defeat to Uzbekistan in Tashkent on 28 February 2000. The team's first official goal was scored in the match by Tsagaantsooj Enkhtur since Mongolia failed to score in its two matches at the 1998 Asian Games. Mongolia did not play its second international friendly until 5 October 2017, a nearly 18-year break between the team's first and second matches. The match ended in a 2–4 defeat to Chinese Taipei. After arranging another friendly in March 2018, this time against Malaysia in Kuala Lumpur which resulted in the team's first non-loss in a friendly, the team took on Mauritius at the MFF Football Centre in Ulaanbaatar for the team's first-ever home friendly and first time playing a non-AFC member.

Mongolia recorded its first-ever FIFA victory on 24 February 2003 with a 2–0 result over Guam during the 2003 East Asian Football Championship. The team earned its second victory during 2004 AFC Asian Cup qualification by a score of 5–0 over the same opponent. That 5–0 scoreline remained Mongolia's largest margin of victory until July 2016 when the team beat the Northern Mariana Islands 8–0 during the 2017 EAFF East Asian Cup. The team broke its own record again in 2018 with a 9–0 victory over the same opponent. Mongolia suffered one of its largest defeats in an official match with a 0–12 result against the Maldives during 2006 FIFA World Cup qualification. Mongolia's senior men's team lost 0–15 to Uzbekistan during the 1998 Asian Games, the team's largest-ever margin of defeat.

== Key ==
Key to matches

- Att. = Match attendance
- (H) = Home ground
- (A) = Away ground
- (N) = Neutral ground

Key to record by opponent

- Pld = Games played
- W = Games won
- D = Games drawn
- L = Games lost
- GF = Goals for
- GA = Goals against

== Results ==
Mongolia's score is shown first in each case.

No.	Date	Venue	Opponents	Score	Competition	Mongolia scorers	Att.	Ref.
1	3 October 1960	Hanoi (A)	North Vietnam	1–3	Tournaments for Asian Communist Nations	Unknown	—	
2	7 October 1960	Hanoi (N)	China	1–6	Tournaments for Asian Communist Nations	Unknown	—	
3	10 October 1960	Hanoi (N)	North Korea	1–10	Tournaments for Asian Communist Nations	Unknown	—	
4	1 December 1998	700th Anniversary Stadium, Chiang Mai (N)	Kuwait	0–11	Football at the 1998 Asian Games		—	
5	5 December 1998	700th Anniversary Stadium, Chiang Mai (N)	Uzbekistan	0–15	Football at the 1998 Asian Games		—	
6	28 February 2000	Pakhtakor Markaziy Stadium, Tashkent (A)	Uzbekistan	1–8	Friendly	Enkhtur	—	
7	5 April 2000	Dongdaemun Stadium, Seoul (N)	Myanmar	0–2	2000 AFC Asian Cup qualification		—	
8	7 April 2000	Dongdaemun Stadium, Seoul (A)	South Korea	0–6	2000 AFC Asian Cup qualification		2,150	
9	9 April 2000	Dongdaemun Stadium, Seoul (N)	Laos	1–2	2000 AFC Asian Cup qualification	Buman-Uchral	—	
10	8 February 2001	Prince Mohamed bin Fahd Stadium, Dammam (A)	Saudi Arabia	0–6	2002 FIFA World Cup qualification		12,000	
11	10 February 2001	Prince Mohamed bin Fahd Stadium, Dammam (N)	Vietnam	0–1	2002 FIFA World Cup qualification		1,000	
12	12 February 2001	Prince Mohamed bin Fahd Stadium, Dammam (N)	Bangladesh	0–3	2002 FIFA World Cup qualification		2,000	
13	15 February 2001	Prince Mohamed bin Fahd Stadium, Dammam (A)	Saudi Arabia	0–6	2002 FIFA World Cup qualification		5,000	
14	17 February 2001	Prince Mohamed bin Fahd Stadium, Dammam (N)	Vietnam	0–4	2002 FIFA World Cup qualification		1,000	
15	19 February 2001	Prince Mohamed bin Fahd Stadium, Dammam (N)	Bangladesh	2–2	2002 FIFA World Cup qualification	Bayarzorig, Buman-Uchral	2,099	
—	19 May 2001	Osaka Expo '70 Stadium, Osaka (N)	South Korea	1–4	2001 East Asian Games	Altan-Ild	—	
—	21 May 2001	Tsurumi-Ryokuchi Stadium, Osaka (N)	Kazakhstan	0–8	2001 East Asian Games		—	
16	23 February 2001	Osaka (N)	Macau	0–4	2001 East Asian Games		—	
17	22 February 2003	Hong Kong Stadium, Hong Kong (N)	Macau	0–2	2003 East Asian Football Championship		6,055	
18	24 February 2003	Hong Kong Stadium, Hong Kong (N)	Guam	2–0	2003 East Asian Football Championship	Tögsbayar, Lumbengarav	1,602	
19	26 February 2003	Hong Kong Stadium, Hong Kong (N)	Chinese Taipei	0–4	2003 East Asian Football Championship		672	
20	28 February 2003	Hong Kong Stadium, Hong Kong (A)	Hong Kong	0–10	2003 East Asian Football Championship		1,814	
21	23 April 2003	Changlimithang Stadium, Thimphu (A)	Guam	5–0	2004 AFC Asian Cup qualification	Tögsbayar (3), Bat-Yalalt, Lkhümbengarav	—	
22	27 April 2003	Changlimithang Stadium, Thimphu (A)	Bhutan	0–0	2004 AFC Asian Cup qualification		—	
23	29 November 2003	National Sports Stadium, Ulaanbaatar (H)	Maldives	0–1	2006 FIFA World Cup qualification		2,000	
24	3 December 2003	National Football Stadium, Malé (A)	Maldives	0–12	2006 FIFA World Cup qualification		9,000	
25	5 March 2005	Zhongshan Soccer Stadium, Taipei (N)	Hong Kong	0–6	2005 East Asian Football Championship		—	
26	7 March 2005	Zhongshan Soccer Stadium, Taipei (N)	North Korea	0–6	2005 East Asian Football Championship		—	
27	9 March 2005	Zhongshan Soccer Stadium, Taipei (N)	Guam	4–1	2005 East Asian Football Championship	Tögsbayar (2), Bayarzorig, Buman-Uchral	—	
28	13 March 2005	Zhongshan Soccer Stadium, Taipei (A)	Chinese Taipei	0–0	2005 East Asian Football Championship		—	
29	17 June 2007	Macau Stadium, Macau (A)	Macau	0–0	2008 East Asian Football Championship		300	
30	19 June 2007	Macau Stadium, Macau (N)	North Korea	0–7	2008 East Asian Football Championship		300	
31	23 June 2007	Macau Stadium, Macau (N)	Guam	5–2	2008 East Asian Football Championship	Bayarzorig (2), Tambora (o.g.), Garidmagnai, Batchuluun	100	
32	21 October 2007	National Sports Stadium, Ulaanbaatar (H)	North Korea	1–4	2010 FIFA World Cup qualification	Selenge	5,000	
33	28 October 2007	Kim Il Sung Stadium, Pyongyang (A)	North Korea	1–5	2010 FIFA World Cup qualification	Lkhümbengarav	4,870	
34	11 March 2009	Leo Palace Resort Main Field, Yona (A)	Guam	0–1	2010 East Asian Football Championship		—	
35	13 March 2009	Leo Palace Resort Main Field, Yona (N)	Macau	2–1	2010 East Asian Football Championship	Tsedenbal, Lkhümbengarav	—	
36	15 March 2009	Leo Palace Resort Main Field, Yona (N)	Northern Mariana Islands	4–1	2010 East Asian Football Championship	Lkhümbengarav, Gerelt-Od, Tsedenbal, Battsagaan	—	
37	7 April 2009	Estádio Campo Desportivo, Taipa (A)	Macau	0–2	2010 AFC Challenge Cup qualification		500	
38	14 April 2009	MFF Football Centre, Ulaanbaatar (H)	Macau	3–1	2010 AFC Challenge Cup qualification	Altankhuyag, Cheung (o.g.), Lkhümbengarav	3,000	
39	9 February 2011	Panaad Stadium, Bacolod (A)	Philippines	0–2	2012 AFC Challenge Cup qualification		20,000	
40	15 March 2011	MFF Football Centre, Ulaanbaatar (H)	Philippines	2–1	2012 AFC Challenge Cup qualification	Lkhümbengarav, Garidmagnai	3,000	
41	29 June 2011	MFF Football Centre, Ulaanbaatar (H)	Myanmar	1–0	2014 FIFA World Cup qualification	Tsend-Ayush	3,500	
42	3 July 2011	Thuwunna Stadium, Yangon (A)	Myanmar	0–2	2014 FIFA World Cup qualification		18,000	
43	2 March 2013	New Laos National Stadium, Vientiane (A)	Laos	1–1	2014 AFC Challenge Cup qualification	Tumenjargal	1,200	
44	4 March 2013	New Laos National Stadium, Vientiane (N)	Afghanistan	0–1	2014 AFC Challenge Cup qualification		500	
45	6 March 2013	New Laos National Stadium, Vientiane (N)	Sri Lanka	0–3	2014 AFC Challenge Cup qualification		200	
46	21 July 2014	GFA National Training Center, Dededo (N)	Northern Mariana Islands	4–0	2015 EAFF East Asian Cup	Tögöldör, Gal-Erden, Altankhuyag, Dashnyam	—	
47	23 July 2014	GFA National Training Center, Dededo (A)	Guam	0–2	2015 EAFF East Asian Cup		—	
48	25 July 2014	GFA National Training Center, Dededo (N)	Macau	2–3	2015 EAFF East Asian Cup	Lumbengarav, Tsolmon	—	
49	12 March 2015	National Stadium, Dili (A)	Timor-Leste	1–4	2018 FIFA World Cup qualification	Erkhembayar	9,000	
50	17 March 2015	MFF Football Centre, Ulaanbaatar (H)	Timor-Leste	0–1	2018 FIFA World Cup qualification		5,000	
51	30 June 2016	GFA National Training Center, Dededo (N)	Macau	2–2	2017 EAFF East Asian Cup	Bayarjargal (2)	—	
52	2 July 2016	GFA National Training Center, Dededo (N)	Chinese Taipei	0–2	2017 EAFF East Asian Cup		—	
53	4 July 2016	GFA National Training Center, Dededo (N)	Northern Mariana Islands	8–0	2017 EAFF East Asian Cup	Tögöldör (3), Bayarjargal (2), Nyam-Osor, Daginaa, Erdenebat	—	
54	3 November 2016	Sarawak Stadium, Kuching (N)	Macau	1–2	2016 AFC Solidarity Cup	Tögöldör	90	
55	6 November 2016	Sarawak State Stadium, Kuching (N)	Sri Lanka	2–0	2016 AFC Solidarity Cup	Nyam-Osor (2)	226	
56	9 November 2016	Sarawak Stadium, Kuching (N)	Laos	0–3	2016 AFC Solidarity Cup		321	
57	5 October 2017	Taipei Municipal Stadium, Taipei (A)	Chinese Taipei	2–4	Friendly	Mönkh-Erdene, Naranbold	—	
58	22 March 2018	Bukit Jalil National Stadium, Kuala Lumpur (A)	Malaysia	2–2	Friendly	Purevdorj, Ser-Od-Yanjiv	—	
59	27 March 2018	MFF Football Centre, Ulaanbaatar (H)	Mauritius	0–2	Friendly		—	
60	2 September 2018	MFF Football Centre, Ulaanbaatar (H)	Macau	4–1	2019 EAFF E-1 Football Championship	Ser-Od-Yanjiv, Janchiv, Batbold, Naranbold	1,654	
61	4 September 2018	MFF Football Centre, Ulaanbaatar (H)	Northern Mariana Islands	9–0	2019 EAFF E-1 Football Championship	Tögöldör (2), Ser-Od-Yanjiv (2), Batbold (2), Temuujin, Janserik, Orkhon	2,021	
62	6 September 2018	MFF Football Centre, Ulaanbaatar (H)	Guam	1–1	2019 EAFF E-1 Football Championship	Tsedenbal	1,521	
63	12 October 2018	Bishan Stadium, Bishan (A)	Singapore	0–2	Friendly		—	
64	16 October 2018	New Laos National Stadium, Vientiane (A)	Laos	4–1	Friendly	Mönkh-Erdene, Artag, Janserik, Naranbold	—	
65	11 November 2018	Taipei Municipal Stadium, Taipei (N)	North Korea	1–4	2019 EAFF E-1 Football Championship	Naranbold	125	
66	13 November 2018	Taipei Municipal Stadium, Taipei (A)	Chinese Taipei	1–2	2019 EAFF E-1 Football Championship	Tsedenbal	1,157	
67	16 November 2018	Taipei Municipal Stadium, Taipei (N)	Hong Kong	1–5	2019 EAFF E-1 Football Championship	Artag	264	
68	6 June 2019	MFF Football Centre, Ulaanbaatar (H)	Brunei	2–0	2022 FIFA World Cup qualification	Tsedenbal, Naranbold	1,685	
69	11 June 2019	Hassanal Bolkiah National Stadium, Bandar Seri Begawan (A)	Brunei	1–2	2022 FIFA World Cup qualification	Tsedenbal	17,210	
70	5 September 2019	MFF Football Centre, Ulaanbaatar (H)	Myanmar	1–0	2022 FIFA World Cup qualification	Amaraa	3,221	
71	10 September 2019	MFF Football Centre, Ulaanbaatar (H)	Tajikistan	0–1	2022 FIFA World Cup qualification		3,455	
72	10 October 2019	Saitama Stadium 2002, Saitama (A)	Japan	0–6	2022 FIFA World Cup qualification		43,122	
73	15 October 2019	MFF Football Centre, Ulaanbaatar (H)	Kyrgyzstan	1–2	2022 FIFA World Cup qualification	Tsedenbal	2,182	
74	14 November 2019	Phnom Penh Olympic Stadium, Phnom Penh (A)	Cambodia	1–1	Friendly	Artag	—	
75	19 November 2019	Mandalarthiri Stadium, Mandalay (A)	Myanmar	0–1	2022 FIFA World Cup qualification		17,468	
76	25 March 2021	Pamir Stadium, Dushanbe (A)	Tajikistan	0–3	2022 FIFA World Cup qualification		9,300	
77	30 March 2021	Fukuda Denshi Arena, Chiba (H)	Japan	0–14	2022 FIFA World Cup qualification		0	
78	7 June 2021	Yanmar Stadium Nagai, Osaka (A)	Kyrgyzstan	1–0	2022 FIFA World Cup qualification	Mijiddorj	0	
79	23 March 2022	New Laos National Stadium, Vientiane (A)	Laos	0–1	Friendly		—	
80	29 March 2022	Sylhet District Stadium, Sylhet (A)	Bangladesh	0–0	Friendly		—	
81	8 June 2022	MFF Football Centre, Ulaanbaatar (H)	Palestine	0–1	2023 AFC Asian Cup qualification		1,828	
82	11 June 2022	MFF Football Centre, Ulaanbaatar (H)	Philippines	0–1	2023 AFC Asian Cup qualification		1,287	
83	14 June 2022	MFF Football Centre, Ulaanbaatar (H)	Yemen	2–0	2023 AFC Asian Cup qualification	Ganbold (2)	1,567	
84	25 March 2023	Adjarabet Arena, Batumi (A)	Georgia	1–6	Friendly	Batbold	—	
85	9 June 2023	Kalinga Stadium, Bhubaneswar (A)	India	0–2	2023 Intercontinental Cup		—	
86	12 June 2023	Kalinga Stadium, Bhubaneswar (N)	Lebanon	0–0	2023 Intercontinental Cup		—	
87	15 June 2023	Kalinga Stadium, Bhubaneswar (N)	Vanuatu	0–1	2023 Intercontinental Cup		—	
88	12 October 2023	Pamir Stadium, Dushanbe (N)	Afghanistan	0–1	2026 FIFA World Cup qualification		1,456	
89	17 October 2023	MFF Football Centre, Ulaanbaatar (H)	Afghanistan	0–1	2026 FIFA World Cup qualification		2,185	
90	22 March 2024	Tofiq Bahramov Republican Stadium, Baku (A)	Azerbaijan	0–1	2024 FIFA Series		3,875	
91	25 March 2024	Dalga Arena, Baku (N)	Tanzania	0–3	2024 FIFA Series		146	
92	7 June 2024	Phnom Penh Olympic Stadium, Phnom Penh (A)	Cambodia	0–2	Friendly		15,266	
93	11 June 2024	MFF Football Centre, Ulaanbaatar (H)	Cambodia	2–1	Friendly	Naranbold, Gantogtokh	—	
94	5 September 2024	Kapten I Wayan Dipta Stadium, Indonesia (N)	Timor-Leste	1–4	2027 AFC Asian Cup qualification	Mijiddorj	108	
95	10 September 2024	MFF Football Centre, Ulaanbaatar (H)	Timor-Leste	2–0	2027 AFC Asian Cup qualification	Amaraa, Daginaa	1,569	
96	8 December 2024	Mong Kok Stadium, Hong Kong (A)	Hong Kong	0–3	2025 EAFF E-1 Football Championship	–	3,329	
97	11 December 2024	Mong Kok Stadium, Hong Kong (N)	Chinese Taipei	0–4	2025 EAFF E-1 Football Championship	–	892	
98	31 May 2026	Jalan Besar Stadium, Singapore (A)	Singapore	0–4	Friendly		4,324	
99	5 June 2026	Hong Kong Stadium, Hong Kong (A)	Hong Kong	0-2	Friendly		6,016	

Notes

1. A: Mongolia loss on the away goals rule.
2. B: Mongolia played their home match against Japan during qualifying for the 2022 FIFA World Cup in Chiba, Japan due to the COVID-19 pandemic in Mongolia.
3. C: Kyrgyzstan played their home match against Mongolia during qualifying for the 2022 FIFA World Cup in Osaka, Japan due to the COVID-19 pandemic in Asia.

== All-time record ==
As of match played 5 June 2026

Team	Pld	W	D	L	GF	GA	GD	WPCT
Afghanistan	3	0	0	3	0	3	−3	0.00
Azerbaijan	1	0	0	1	0	1	−1	0.00
Bangladesh	3	0	2	1	2	5	−3	0.00
Bhutan	1	0	1	0	0	0	0	0.00
Brunei	2	1	0	1	3	2	+1	50.00
Cambodia	3	1	1	1	3	4	−1	33.33
China	1	0	0	1	1	6	−5	0.00
Chinese Taipei	6	0	1	5	3	16	−13	0.00
Georgia	1	0	0	1	1	6	−5	0.00
Guam	7	4	1	2	17	7	+10	57.14
Hong Kong	5	0	0	5	1	26	−25	0.00
India	1	0	0	1	0	2	−2	0.00
Japan	2	0	0	2	0	20	−20	0.00
Kuwait	1	0	0	1	0	11	−11	0.00
Kyrgyzstan	2	1	0	1	2	2	0	50.00
Laos	5	1	1	3	6	8	−2	20.00
Lebanon	1	0	1	0	0	0	0	0.00
Macau	10	3	2	5	14	18	−4	30.00
Malaysia	1	0	1	0	2	2	0	0.00
Maldives	2	0	0	2	0	13	−13	0.00
Mauritius	1	0	0	1	0	2	−2	0.00
Myanmar	5	2	0	3	2	5	−3	40.00
North Korea	6	0	0	6	4	36	−32	0.00
Northern Mariana Islands	4	4	0	0	25	1	+24	100.00
Palestine	1	0	0	1	0	1	−1	0.00
Philippines	3	1	0	2	2	4	−2	33.33
Saudi Arabia	2	0	0	2	0	12	−12	0.00
Singapore	2	0	0	2	0	6	−6	0.00
South Korea	1	0	0	1	0	6	−6	0.00
Sri Lanka	2	1	0	1	2	3	−1	50.00
Tajikistan	2	0	0	2	0	4	−4	0.00
Timor-Leste	4	1	0	3	4	6	−2	25.00
Tanzania	1	0	0	1	0	3	−3	0.00
Uzbekistan	2	0	0	2	1	23	−22	0.00
Vanuatu	1	0	0	1	0	1	−1	0.00
Vietnam (Note: Includes results against North Vietnam.)	3	0	0	3	1	8	−7	0.00
Yemen	1	1	0	0	2	0	+2	100.00
Total	99	21	11	67	98	273	−175	21.21

Source: Results
