= 1988 Mongolian National Championship =

Football league season in Mongolia

Mongolian National Championship
- Season: 1988
- Champions: Sükhbataar

The 1988 Mongolian National Championship was the twenty-fourth recorded edition of the Mongolian National Championship for football, with the first tournament taking place in 1955 and no tournament held in 1965 or apparently in 1977. It would appear however that championships were contested between 1956 and 1963, as sources note that a team called Aldar, the Mongolian Army Sports Club, won the title on numerous occasions during that time. Nonetheless, the 1988 national championship was won by Sükhbataar, a team from Sükhbaatar District, a Düüreg (district) of Ulaanbaatar, their second title and second in a row following their first victory in the 1987 championship, only the second time a Mongolian team had won back-to-back national titles following Tengeriin Bugnuud's victories in 1981 and 1982.
