= 1969 Mongolian National Championship =

Football league season in Mongolia

Mongolian National Championship
- Season: 1969
- Champions: Tengeriin Bugnuud

The 1969 Mongolian National Championship was the sixth recorded edition of the Mongolian National Championship for football, with the first tournament taking place in 1955 and no tournament held in 1965. It would appear however that championships were contested between 1956 and 1963, as sources note that a team called Aldar, the Mongolian Army Sports Club, won the title on numerous occasions during that time. Nonetheless, the 1969 national championship was won by Tengeriin Bugnuud, a team from Bat-Ölzii, a sum (district) of Övörkhangai Province in southern Mongolia, their second title following victory in the 1967 championship.
