= 1978 Mongolian National Championship =

Football league season in Mongolia

Mongolian National Championship
- Season: 1978
- Champions: Aldar

The 1978 Mongolian National Championship was the fourteenth recorded edition of the Mongolian National Championship for football, with the first tournament taking place in 1955 and no tournament held in 1965 or apparently in 1977.

It would appear however that championships were contested between 1956 and 1963, as sources note that a team called Aldar, the Mongolian Army Sports Club, won the title on numerous occasions during that time.

The 1978 national championship was won by Zamchin (a team representing railwaymen) their first, and as of 2016 their only recorded title, following their second-place finish in the 1974 championship.
