= 1989 Mongolian National Championship =

Football league season in Mongolia

Mongolian National Championship
- Season: 1989
- Champions: Khuldumur

The 1989 Mongolian National Championship was the twenty-fifth recorded edition of the Mongolian National Championship for football, with the first tournament taking place in 1955 and no tournament held in 1965 or apparently in 1977. It would appear however that championships were contested between 1956 and 1963, as sources note that a team called Aldar, the Mongolian Army Sports Club, won the title on numerous occasions during that time. Nonetheless, the 1989 national championship was won for the fourth time by Khuldumur (literally: Labour or Workers and also romanised as Hödölmör) and the first time since their success in the 1972 season

== Final ==
The complete structure of the season is unclear in the available sources, but it is known that Khuldumur won the championship following a final play-off match against Sükhbaatar.

Khuldumur	1–0	Sükhbaatar
	Report
