= 1974 Mongolian National Championship =

Football league season in Mongolia

Mongolian National Championship
- Season: 1974
- Champions: Aldar

The 1974 Mongolian National Championship was the eleventh recorded edition of the Mongolian National Championship for football, with the first tournament taking place in 1955 and no tournament held in 1965. The 1974 national championship was won by Aldar (literally Glory; a team representing the Army sports society) their second recorded title, following their victory in the 1970 championship. Though it would appear however that championships were contested between 1956 and 1963, as sources note that a team called Aldar, the Mongolian Army Sports Club, won the title on numerous occasions during that time. Zamchin, a team representing railway workers finished as runners up, with Darkhan, representing the city of Darkhan, the capital of Darkhan-Uul Aimag, the 1968 champions, finishing third.
