= Murun Altankhuyag =

Mongolian international footballer

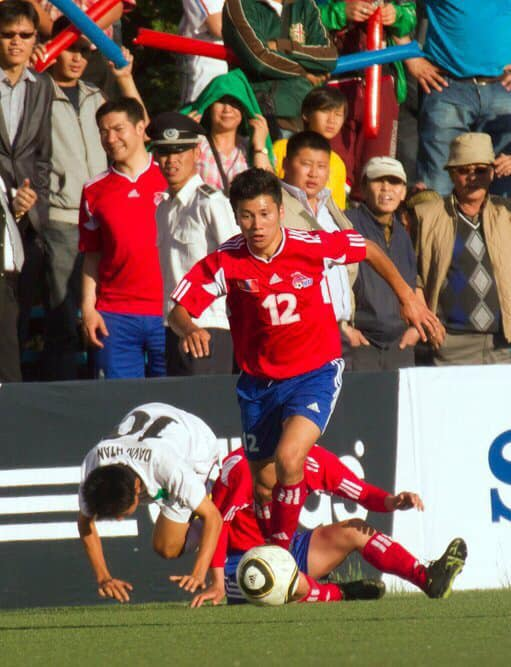

Personal information
- Date of birth: 21 September 1989 (age 37)
- Place of birth: Ulan Bator, Mongolia
- Height: 1.71 m (5 ft 7 1/2 in)
- Position: Striker

Team information
- Current team: Ulaanbaatar City

College career
Years	Team	Apps	(Gls)
2009	Hannibal-LaGrange Trojans	11	(1)
2010–2012	Central Methodist Eagles	37	(18)

Senior career*
Years	Team	Apps	(Gls)
2006–2008	Selenge Press		
2008–2009	Ulaanbaatar University		
2013–2015	Krabi		
2014	→ Satun United (loan)		
2015	Mačva Šabac		
2016	Selenge Press		
2016–	Ulaanbaatar City		

International career^{‡}
2007–	Mongolia	14	(2)
- * Club domestic league appearances and goals as of 02:20, 3 February 2017 (UTC) ‡ National team caps and goals as of 02:27, 3 February 2017 (UTC)

Murun Altankhuyag (Mongolian: Алтанхуягийн Мөрөн, Altankhuyagiin Mörön; born 21 September 1989) is a Mongolian international footballer who plays for Ulaanbaatar City of the Mongolian Premier League as a striker.

== Club career ==
Born in Ulan Bator, Murun began playing soccer at age 12. He played for Mongolian Premier League clubs Selenge Press and Ulaanbaatar University from 2006 to 2008 and 2008–2009, respectively. He then played college soccer in the United States for the Hannibal-LaGrange University Trojans and the Central Methodist Eagles, both of the NAIA. In his one season at Hannibal-LaGrange, he tallied 1 goal and 2 assists in 11 matches. He scored his goal against the Truman Bulldogs on 3 November 2009. During his three seasons at CMU, he made 37 appearances and tallied 18 goals and 6 assists. He initially received an invitation to Hannibal-LaGrange after vying for a scholarship against 120 other candidates from Europe and Latin America.

He signed a two-year contract with Krabi F.C. of the Thai Division 1 League in December 2013, becoming Mongolia's first ever professional footballer and one of the first footballers to play abroad. He made his debut for the club on 9 April 2014 in a Cup match against Khonkaen F.C., the club's rivals. Despite Murun scoring a goal in the match, Krabi was eliminated by the eventual 1–2 defeat. Between the opening match of the season in February and mid May, he made only two appearances for the club. He moved on loan to Satun United in May 2014 to secure more playing time and was Regional League South Division runner-up that season. He played his first match for Satun United on 10 May 2014 in a Cup match. He trained with Suphanburi FC of the Thai Premier League to become acclimated to the weather of Thailand before joining Krabi. Also prior to joining Krabi, he initially trialed with Rangsit F.C., also in Thailand, and Lao Toyota F.C. of the Lao Premier League. He was offered a professional contract by Lao Toyota but opted to join Krabi because of a preference to play in Thailand over Laos.

He signed for Serbian First League club Mačva Šabac in March 2015 on a 1-year contract, becoming one of the first professional Mongolian footballers in Europe. He was signed by the club without a trial after he was recommended to Ivica Kralj by Dragan Anicic, head coach of FK BSK Borča, another Serbian team with which Murun trialed before FK Mačva Šabac. He trialed with three Serbian clubs in total. He also received invitations from clubs in Croatia and Bosnia and Herzegovina but did not attend because of visa and insurance issues.

In January 2016, Murun returned to Mongolia and re-signed for Selenge Press FC after Mačva Šabac were relegated to the Serbian League. His contract was terminated because Serbian rules did not allow non-Serbian nationals to be on the roster of teams in the third division or lower. The player stated his return to the club was temporary while he searched for another professional club abroad. On 22 May 2016, he scored a goal in his first match back with the club, a 2–1 victory over FC Ulaanbaatar.

In May 2016, Murun joined fellow Mongolian Premier League club Ulaanbaatar City.

== International career ==
Murun represented Mongolia at youth level, including matches against South Korea and North Korea for the U15 side. He made his senior international debut for Mongolia on 21 November 2007 in a 2010 FIFA World Cup qualifying match against North Korea. At age 16, he was the youngest player ever called up to the senior squad at the time of his debut.

=== International goals ===
Scores and results list Mongolia's goal tally first.

#	Date	Venue	Opponent	Score	Result	Competition
1	14 April 2009	MFF Football Centre, Ulan Bator, Mongolia	Macau	1–1	3–1	2010 AFC Challenge Cup qualification
2	21 July 2014	GFA National Training Center, Harmon, Guam	Northern Mariana Islands	3–0	4–0	2015 EAFF East Asian Cup
Last updated 5 June 2016

=== International statistics ===
As of 2 January 2017

Mongolia national team
Year	Apps	Goals
2007	2	0
2008	0	0
2009	4	1
2010	0	0
2011	2	0
2012	0	0
2013	0	0
2014	3	1
2015	1	0
2016	2	0
Total	14	2

== Honours ==
Ulaanbaatar City

- Mongolian Premier League: 2009
