= Jansyerik Maratkhan =

Mongolian footballer

Personal information
- Full name: Jansyerik Maratkhan; Жансерик Маратхан
- Date of birth: 4 April 1999 (age 27)
- Place of birth: Bayan-Ölgii Province, Mongolia
- Height: 1.74 m (5 ft 9 in)
- Positions: Midfielder; forward

Team information
- Current team: SP Falcons
- Number: 9

Youth career
- 2008–2018: Deren

Senior career*
Years	Team	Apps	(Gls)
2008–2019	Deren		
2020–	SP Falcons		

International career^{‡}
2018–	Mongolia	13	(2)
- * Club domestic league appearances and goals as of 14:01, 17 November 2018 (UTC) ‡ National team caps and goals as of 12:57, 10 June 2021 (UTC)

Jansyerik Maratkhan (Mongolian: Жансерик Маратхан; born 4 April 1999) is a Mongolian footballer who plays as an attacking midfielder for Mongolian Premier League club SP Falcons and the Mongolian national team.

== Club career ==
Jansyerik played for Deren FC from 2008 to 2019. Prior the 2020 Mongolian National Premier League season, he joined SP Falcons. He made his debut for the club in the opening match of the season, a 1–0 victory over his former club, Deren.

== International career ==
On 8 November 2017 Jansyerik scored a hattrick against Singapore in a 4–2 victory in 2018 AFC U-19 Championship qualification. He made his senior international debut on 2 September 2018 in a 2019 EAFF E-1 Football Championship match against Macau.

=== International goals ===
Score and result list Mongolia's goal tally first.

#	Date	Venue	Opponent	Score	Result	Competition
1	4 September 2018	MFF Football Centre, Ulaanbaatar, Mongolia	Northern Mariana Islands	8–0	9–0	2019 EAFF E-1 Football Championship
2	16 October 2018	New Laos National Stadium, Vientiane, Laos	Laos	4–1	4–1	Friendly
Last updated 18 November 2018

=== International career statistics ===
As of match played 16 November 2018

Mongolia national team
Year	Apps	Goals
2018	7	2
Total	7	2

== Personal life ==
Jansyerik was born in Bayan-Ölgii Province. He is an Muslims from ethnic Kazakh.
