= 2010 AFC Challenge Cup qualification =

The 2010 AFC Challenge Cup qualification phase saw five teams advance to the finals to join three automatic qualifiers in the final tournament in Sri Lanka.

Qualification consisted of two sections.

- A playoff between the 19th and 20th ranked entrants (Mongolia and Macau)
- Four qualification groups for four teams. Each group winner advanced to the finals, along with the best-ranked runner-up. Because of the withdrawal of Afghanistan, the ranking of second-placed teams excluded results of any matches against fourth-placed sides.

== Seeding ==
Seeding was based partially on the FIFA World Ranks as at January 2009 (ranking shown in brackets).

Automatic Qualifiers	Group Hosts	Other Teams
North Korea (116); India (142); Tajikistan (146)	Maldives (157); Sri Lanka (164); Nepal (174); Bangladesh (175)	1. Turkmenistan (149); 2. Myanmar (158); 3. Kyrgyzstan (159); 4. Philippines (162); 5. Pakistan (165); 6. Chinese Taipei (166); 7. Cambodia (179); 8. Palestine (180); 9. Brunei (182); 10. Afghanistan (184); 11. Bhutan (189); 12. Mongolia (193); 13. Macau (197)

Laos, Timor-Leste and Guam chose not to compete. Afghanistan withdrew prior to their first match.

== Qualifying preliminary round ==
Moved from originally scheduled dates of 7 March and 14 March due to conflict with the qualification for the 2010 East Asian Football Championship.

7 April 2009
20:00 UTC+8

Macau	2–0	Mongolia
Chan Kin Seng 22'; Leong Chong In 24'	Report

Estádio Campo Desportivo, Macau
Attendance: 500
Referee: Hettikamkanamge Perera (Sri Lanka)

14 April 2009
15:00 UTC+8

Mongolia	3–1	Macau
Altankhuyag 55'; Geofredo 77' (o.g.); Lkhümbengarav 89'	Report	Chan Kin Seng 39'

MFF Football Centre, Ulan Bator
Attendance: 3,000
Referee: Yu Ming-hsun (Chinese Taipei)

3–3 on aggregate. Macau advanced to the group phase on the away goals rule.

== Qualifying group stage ==
Qualification was officially scheduled to take place from 2–13 April 2009, although the actual dates began before and extended beyond that. Each qualification group was held in a single location - Bangladesh, Maldives, Nepal and Sri Lanka hosting their respective groups.

The teams were ranked according to points (3 points for a win, 1 point for a tie, 0 points for a loss) and tie breakers were in following order:

1. Greater number of points obtained in the group matches between the teams concerned;
2. Goal difference resulting from the group matches between the teams concerned;
3. Greater number of goals scored in the group matches between the teams concerned;
4. Goal difference in all the group matches;
5. Greater number of goals scored in all the group matches;
6. Kicks from the penalty mark if only two teams are involved and they are both on the field of play;
7. Fewer score calculated according to the number of yellow and red cards received in the group matches; (1 point for each yellow card, 3 points for each red card as a consequence of two yellow cards, 3 points for each direct red card, 4 points for each yellow card followed by a direct red card)
8. Drawing of lots.

Key to colours in group tables
Group winners and runners-up qualify for the final tournament

=== Group A ===
- Matches played in Bangladesh.
- Times listed are UTC+6.

Team	Pld	W	D	L	GF	GA	GD	Pts
Myanmar	3	3	0	0	7	1	+6	9
Bangladesh	3	2	0	1	5	2	+3	6
Cambodia	3	1	0	2	2	3	−1	3
Macau	3	0	0	3	1	9	−8	0

Source: RSSSF
26 April 2009
15:30

Myanmar	4–0	Macau
Khin Maung Lwin 3'; Yazar Win Thein 15'; Pyaye Phyo Oo 48'; Myo Min Tun 59'	Report

Bangabandhu National Stadium, Dhaka
Attendance: 3,600
Referee: Dmitriy Mashentsev (Kyrgyzstan)
26 April 2009
18:00

Cambodia	0–1	Bangladesh
	Report	Enamul 73'

Bangabandhu National Stadium, Dhaka
Attendance: 8,060
Referee: Saeid Mozaffarizadeh (Iran)

28 April 2009
15:30

Macau	1–2	Cambodia
Che Chi Man 75'	Report	Vathanak 12'; Sokngon 66'

Bangabandhu National Stadium, Dhaka
Attendance: 6,000
Referee: Ali Saleem (Maldives)
28 April 2009
18:00

Bangladesh	1–2	Myanmar
Enamul 12'	Report	Pai Soe 68', 77'

Bangabandhu National Stadium, Dhaka
Attendance: 14,000
Referee: Hajime Matsuo (Japan)

30 April 2009
15:30

Myanmar	1–0	Cambodia
Yazar Win Thein 90+4'	Report

Bangabandhu National Stadium, Dhaka
Attendance: 2,500
Referee: Saeid Mozaffarizadeh (Iran)
30 April 2009
18:00

Bangladesh	3–0	Macau
Mamunul 38'; Zahid 68', 71'	Report

Bangabandhu National Stadium, Dhaka
Attendance: 8,700
Referee: Dmitriy Mashentsev (Kyrgyzstan)

=== Group B ===
- Matches played in the Maldives.
- Times listed are UTC+5.

Team	Pld	W	D	L	GF	GA	GD	Pts
Turkmenistan	3	3	0	0	15	1	+14	9
Maldives	3	2	0	1	9	5	+4	6
Philippines	3	1	0	2	3	8	−5	3
Bhutan	3	0	0	3	0	13	−13	0

Source: RSSSF
14 April 2009
16:00

Turkmenistan	3–1	Maldives
Nasyrow 42'; Şamyradow 49'; Mirzoýew 68' (pen.)	Report	Fazeel 61' (pen.)

Galolhu National Stadium, Malé
Attendance: 9,000
Referee: Naser Al-Ghafary (Jordan)
14 April 2009
21:00

Philippines	1–0	Bhutan
Gould 13'	Report

Galolhu National Stadium, Malé
Attendance: 200
Referee: Kadhum Auda (Iraq)

16 April 2009
16:00

Maldives	3–2	Philippines
Fazeel 26' (pen.); Ashfaq 45'; Naseer 82'	Report	Borromeo 11'; Gould 90+2'

Galolhu National Stadium, Malé
Attendance: 9,000
Referee: Alireza Faghani (Iran)
16 April 2009
21:00

Bhutan	0–7	Turkmenistan
	Report	Ataýew 13', 67', 79'; Çoňkaýew 16'; Urazow 47'; Mingazow 62'; Mirzoýew 90+3'

Galolhu National Stadium, Malé
Attendance: 300
Referee: Hettikamkanamge Perera (Sri Lanka)

18 April 2009
16:00

Turkmenistan	5–0	Philippines
Del Rosario 26' (o.g.); Şamyradow 54', 63'; Nasyrow 58'; Urazow 65'	Report

Galolhu National Stadium, Malé
Attendance: 400
Referee: Naser Al-Ghafary (Jordan)
18 April 2009
21:00

Bhutan	0–5	Maldives
	Report	Ashfaq 4' 36'; Fazeel 45+1' (pen.), 47'; Umair 80'

Galolhu National Stadium, Malé
Attendance: 9,000
Referee: Kadhum Auda (Iraq)

=== Group C ===
- Matches played in Nepal.
- Times listed are UTC+5:45.

Team	Pld	W	D	L	GF	GA	GD	Pts
Kyrgyzstan	2	0	2	0	2	2	0	2
Nepal	2	0	2	0	1	1	0	2
Palestine	2	0	2	0	1	1	0	2
Afghanistan (W)	0	0	0	0	0	0	0	0

Source: RSSSF
(W) Withdrew on 24 March 2009

Tie-breaking situation:

- Kyrgyzstan ranked ahead of Nepal and Palestine on the basis of goals scored.
- Nepal ranked ahead of Palestine on the basis of a better disciplinary record (Nepal 1 yellow card - Palestine 3 yellow cards).
26 March 2009
15:00

Nepal	0–0	Palestine
	Report

Dasarath Rangasala Stadium, Kathmandu
Attendance: 12,000
Referee: Andre El Haddad (Lebanon)

28 March 2009
15:00

Kyrgyzstan	1–1	Nepal
Murzaev 86' (pen.)	Report	Maharjan 2'

Dasarath Rangasala Stadium, Kathmandu
Attendance: 15,000
Referee: Yadollah Jahanbazi (Iran)

30 March 2009
15:00

Kyrgyzstan	1–1	Palestine
Murzaev 20' (pen.)	Report	Al-Sobakhi 29'

Dasarath Rangasala Stadium, Kathmandu
Attendance: 2,000
Referee: Yu Ming-hsun (Chinese Taipei)

=== Group D ===
- Matches played in Sri Lanka.
- Times listed are UTC+5:30.

Team	Pld	W	D	L	GF	GA	GD	Pts
Sri Lanka	3	2	1	0	9	4	+5	7
Pakistan	3	1	2	0	9	3	+6	5
Chinese Taipei	3	1	1	1	7	3	+4	4
Brunei	3	0	0	3	1	16	−15	0

Source: RSSSF
4 April 2009
16:00

Sri Lanka	5–1	Brunei
Jayasuriya 23', 53', 67', 73'; A. Mohamed 32'	Report	Kamarul 82'

Sugathadasa Stadium, Colombo
Attendance: 700
Referee: Zhao Liang (China PR)
4 April 2009
18:30

Pakistan	1–1	Chinese Taipei
A. Ahmed 53'	Report	Chang Han 21'

Sugathadasa Stadium, Colombo
Attendance: 400
Referee: Vladislav Tseytlin (Uzbekistan)

6 April 2009
16:00

Brunei	0–6	Pakistan
	Report	S. Khan 19', 61', 68', 78'; J. Khan 31'; A. Ahmed 84'

Sugathadasa Stadium, Colombo
Attendance: 200
Referee: Dilovarshokh Orzuev (Tajikistan)
6 April 2009
18:30

Chinese Taipei	1–2	Sri Lanka
Huang Wei-yi 80'	Report	Jayasuriya 35'; Ruwanthilake 39'

Sugathadasa Stadium, Colombo
Attendance: 1,400
Referee: Khalid Al-Zahrani (Saudi Arabia)

8 April 2009
16:00

Chinese Taipei	5–0	Brunei
Chen Po-liang 11', 13', 58'; Huang Wei-yi 30'; Kuo Chun-yi 80'	Report

Sugathadasa Stadium, Colombo
Attendance: 1,000
Referee: Khalid Al-Zahrani (Saudi Arabia)
8 April 2009
18:30

Sri Lanka	2–2	Pakistan
Ruwanthilake 2'; S. Sanjeev 88'	Report	S. Khan 82'; Bashir 84'

Sugathadasa Stadium, Colombo
Attendance: 3,000
Referee: Vladislav Tseytlin (Uzbekistan)

=== Ranking of second placed teams ===
The best-ranked second placed team also qualified for the finals tournament.

Due to Afghanistan's withdrawal from Group C, matches against fourth-placed sides in the other groups were excluded from the following comparison.

Grp	Team	Pld	W	D	L	GF	GA	GD	Pts
A	Bangladesh	2	1	0	1	2	2	0	3
B	Maldives	2	1	0	1	4	5	−1	3
D	Pakistan	2	0	2	0	3	3	0	2
C	Nepal	2	0	2	0	1	1	0	2

Source: RSSSF

Notes on the tie-breaking situation:

- Bangladesh ranked ahead of the Maldives on the basis of goal difference.
- Pakistan ranked ahead of Nepal on the basis of goals scored.

== Final tournament ==
The final tournament, consisting of 8 teams, was eventually held from 16–27 February in Sri Lanka.

=== Qualifiers ===
The eight teams that qualified for the final tournament are:

- India U23 – automatic qualifier
- North Korea – automatic qualifier
- Tajikistan – automatic qualifier
- Myanmar – winner Group A
- Turkmenistan – winner Group B
- Kyrgyzstan – winner Group C
- Sri Lanka – winner Group D
- Bangladesh – best runner-up

The draw for the final tournament was done on 30 November 2009 at the Galadri Hotel in Colombo, Sri Lanka.

== Goalscorers ==
5 goals

- (Pakistan) Safiullah Khan
- (Sri Lanka) Kasun Jayasuriya

4 goals

- (Maldives) Ibrahim Fazeel

3 goals

- (Chinese Taipei) Chen Po-liang
- (Maldives) Ali Ashfaq
- (Turkmenistan) Döwletmyrat Ataýew
- (Turkmenistan) Berdi Şamyradow

2 goals

- (Bangladesh) Enamul Haque
- (Bangladesh) Mohammed Zahid Hossain
- (Chinese Taipei) Huang Wei-yi
- (Kyrgyzstan) Mirlan Murzaev
- (Macau) Chan Kin Seng
- (Myanmar) Pai Soe
- (Myanmar) Yazar Win Thein
- (Pakistan) Adnan Ahmed
- (Philippines) Chad Gould
- (Sri Lanka) Rohana Ruwanthilake
- (Turkmenistan) Arif Mirzoýew
- (Turkmenistan) Mekan Nasyrow
- (Turkmenistan) Didargylyç Urazow

1 goal

- (Bangladesh) Mohd Mamunul Islam
- (Brunei) Kamarul Ariffin Ramlee
- (Cambodia) Keo Sokngon
- (Cambodia) Teab Vathanak
- (Chinese Taipei) Chang Han
- (Chinese Taipei) Kuo Chun-yi
- (Macau) Che Chi Man
- (Macau) Leong Chong In
- (Maldives) Mukhthar Naseer
- (Maldives) Mohamed Umair
- (Mongolia) Murun Altankhuyag
- (Mongolia) Donorovyn Lkhümbengarav
- (Myanmar) Khin Maung Lwin
- (Myanmar) Myo Min Tun
- (Myanmar) Pyae Phyo Oo
- (Nepal) Biraj Maharjan
- (Pakistan) Atif Bashir
- (Pakistan) Jadid Khan Pathan
- (Palestine) Said Al-Sobakhi
- (Philippines) Alexander Borromeo
- (Sri Lanka) Asmeer Lathif Mohamed
- (Sri Lanka) Shanmugarajah Sanjeev
- (Turkmenistan) Gahrymanberdi Çoňkaýew
- (Turkmenistan) Ruslan Mingazow

Own goal

- (Macau) Geofredo (playing against Mongolia)
- (Philippines) Anton del Rosario (playing against Turkmenistan)
