= Mönkh-Erdengiin Tögöldör =

Mongolian footballer (born 1991)

Personal information
- Full name: Mönkh-Erdengiin Tögöldör; Мөнх-Эрдэнгийн Төгөлдөр
- Date of birth: 23 February 1991 (age 35)
- Place of birth: Ulaanbaatar, Mongolia
- Position: Midfielder

Team information
- Current team: SP Falcons
- Number: 10

Senior career*
Years	Team	Apps	(Gls)
2012–2020	Erchim		(23)
2020–	SP Falcons		(25)

International career^{‡}
2013–	Mongolia	19	(7)
- * Club domestic league appearances and goals as of 20:33, 25 August 2024 (UTC) ‡ National team caps and goals as of 12:20, 10 June 2021 (UTC)

Mönkh-Erdeniin Tögöldör (Mongolian: Мөнх-Эрдэнийн Төгөлдөр; born 23 February 1991) is a Mongolian footballer who plays for SP Falcons in Ulanbaatar as a midfielder. With 7 goals he is Mongolia's third top scorer of all-time.

== Career ==
=== Club ===
Tögöldör started playing football at age 10 with various local and provincial teams. He joined Erchim FC of the Mongolian Premier League in 2010.

In late 2014, Tögöldör and fellow Mongolian Khürelbaataryn Tsend-Ayuush played for Yingcharoen F.C. of the Thailand Amateur League, the fifth level of football in the country, in the off-season in hopes of being spotted and signed by a professional club. Neither player was ultimately signed and Tögöldör returned to Erchim FC.

In early January 2018 it was reported that Tögöldör and two other Mongolian players were being eyed by the Uzbekistan Football Federation in hopes of signing them to Uzbek League clubs.

Prior to the 2020 season, Tögöldör signed for SP Falcons, also of the Mongolian Premier League, along with Tsend-Ayuush Khürelbaatar and Tserendovdon Tumur-Ochir. He scored his first goal for the club in the opening match of the season, the eventual game-winner in the 1–0 victory over Deren FC. The goal was also the overall first goal scored by any team in 2020.

=== International ===
Tögöldör played his first international game with the senior national team on 6 March 2013 in and against Sri Lanka (3–0), after he came on as a substitute for Amgalangiin Chinzorig in the 60th minute of that game.

=== International goals ===
Scores and results list Mongolia's goal tally first.

#	Date	Venue	Opponent	Score	Result	Competition
1.	21 July 2014	GFA National Training Center, Dededo, Guam	Northern Mariana Islands	1–0	4–0	2015 EAFF East Asian Cup qualification
2.	4 July 2016	GFA National Training Center, Dededo, Guam	Northern Mariana Islands	5–0	8–0	2017 EAFF E-1 Football Championship qualification
3.	4 July 2016	GFA National Training Center, Dededo, Guam	Northern Mariana Islands	6–0	8–0	2017 EAFF E-1 Football Championship qualification
4.	4 July 2016	GFA National Training Center, Dededo, Guam	Northern Mariana Islands	7–0	8–0	2017 EAFF E-1 Football Championship qualification
5.	3 November 2016	Sarawak Stadium, Kuching, Malaysia	Macau	1–1	1–2	2016 AFC Solidarity Cup
6.	4 September 2018	MFF Football Centre, Ulaanbaatar, Mongolia	Northern Mariana Islands	1–0	9–0	2019 EAFF E-1 Football Championship qualification
7.	4 September 2018	MFF Football Centre, Ulaanbaatar, Mongolia	Northern Mariana Islands	2–0	9–0	2019 EAFF E-1 Football Championship qualification
Last updated 4 September 2018

== Honours ==
Erchim

- Mongolia Premier League: 2012, 2013, 2015, 2016
- Mongolia Cup: 2012
