= 1966 Mongolian National Championship =

Football league season in Mongolia

Mongolian National Championship
- Season: 1966
- Champions: Khudulmur

The 1966 Mongolian National Championship was the third recorded edition of the Mongolian National Championship for football, with the first tournament taking place in 1955 and no tournament held the previous year. It would appear however that championships were contested between 1956 and 1963, as sources note that a team called Aldar won the title on numerous occasions during that time. Nonetheless, the 1966 national championship was won by Khudulmur (literally: Labour or Workers and also romanised as Hödölmör), their second title following victory in the 1964 championship.
