= Davaajav Battör =

Mongolian footballer

Personal information
- Full name: Battöriin Davaajav; Баттөрийн Даваажав
- Date of birth: 20 May 1990 (age 36)
- Place of birth: Mongolia
- Position: Defender

Team information
- Current team: Erchim
- Number: 12

Senior career*
Years	Team	Apps	(Gls)
2010–	Erchim	?	(?)

International career^{‡}
2015–	Mongolia	26	(0)
- * Club domestic league appearances and goals ‡ National team caps and goals as of 10 June 2021

Battöriin Davaajav (Mongolian: Баттөрийн Даваажав; born 20 May 1990) is a Mongolian footballer who plays as a defender for Mongolian Premier League club Erchim and the Mongolian national team. He made his first appearance for the Mongolia national football team in 2015.
