= 1995 Mongolian National Championship =

Football league season in Mongolia

Mongolian National Championship
- Season: 1995
- Champions: Idsskh

The 1995 Mongolian National Championship was the twenty-eighth recorded edition of the Mongolian National Championship for football, with the first tournament taking place in 1955 and no tournament held in 1965 or apparently in 1977. It would appear however that championships were contested between 1956 and 1963, as sources note that a team called Aldar, the Mongolian Army Sports Club, won the title on numerous occasions during that time. Nonetheless, the 1995 national championship, which was the last iteration before the tournament was restructured into the Mongolian Premier League, was won for the first, and to date only time by Idsskh, a Mongolian all-university team.
