= Tsedenbal =

Tsedenbal (Mongolian: Цэдэнбал) is a Mongolian personal name.

Notable people bearing this name include:

== Proper name ==
- Yumjaagiin Tsedenbal (1916–1991), one of the leaders of Mongolia from 1952 to 1984
- Norjmoogiin Tsedenbal (born 1988), Mongolian international footballer

== Patronymic ==
- Tsedenbalyn Tümenjargal (born 1989), Mongolian international footballer
