= 1990 Mongolian National Championship =

Football league season in Mongolia

Mongolian National Championship
- Season: 1990
- Champions: Khuch

The 1990 Mongolian National Championship was the twenty-sixth recorded edition of the Mongolian National Championship for football, with the first tournament taking place in 1955 and no tournament held in 1965 or apparently in 1977. It would appear however that championships were contested between 1956 and 1963, as sources note that a team called Aldar, the Mongolian Army Sports Club, won the title on numerous occasions during that time. Nonetheless, the 1990 national championship was won for the second time by Khuch, also known as Dynamo Ulan Bator, a team representing the Police Sports Society.
