= 1983 Mongolian National Championship =

Football league season in Mongolia

Mongolian National Championship
- Season: 1983
- Champions: Hilchin

The 1983 Mongolian National Championship was the nineteenth recorded edition of the Mongolian National Championship for football, with the first tournament taking place in 1955 and no tournament held in 1965 or apparently in 1977. It would appear however that championships were contested between 1956 and 1963, as sources note that a team called Aldar, the Mongolian Army Sports Club, won the title on numerous occasions during that time. Nonetheless, the 1982 national championship was won by Hilchin, a team from the association of Jadambaa (and also romanised Ajilchin) their first and, as of 2016, only national title. However, Hilchin did win the first five Spartakiads in Mongolia, football competitions held at the people's revolution anniversary festivals, with sources stating that following this either they got to keep the trophy in perpetuity or that the competition was named after them.
