= Tserenjavyn Enkhjargal =

Mongolian footballer

Personal information
- Full name: Tserenjavyn Enkhjargal; Цэрэнжавын Энхжаргал
- Date of birth: October 26, 1984 (age 42)
- Place of birth: Mongolia
- Height: 1.78 m (5 ft 10 in)
- Position: Sweeper

Team information
- Current team: Khaan Khuns-Erchim
- Number: 8

Senior career*
Years	Team	Apps	(Gls)
2003–2004	Mojn-Uran	10+	(1+)
2004–2010	Ulaanbaatar United		
2011–	Khaan Khuns-Erchim (Note: "Erchim" until the 2020–21 season when the club changed its name to Khaan Khuns-Erchim after a club merger)		

International career
2000–2016	Mongolia	21	(0)
- * Club domestic league appearances and goals

Tserenjavyn Enkhjargal (Mongolian: Цэрэнжавын Энхжаргал; born 26 October 1984) is a Mongolian footballer who plays as a sweeper for Mongolian Premier League club Khaan Khuns-Erchim.

== International career ==
He made his first appearance for the Mongolia national football team on 21 February 2000 during a friendly match which saw Mongolia fall to an 8–1 defeat against Uzbekistan.

He has represented Mongolia during East Asian Football Championship qualifying, AFC Asian Cup qualifying, and FIFA World Cup qualifying.

His last appearance came on 4 July 2016 during an 8–0 win against Northern Mariana Islands during the preliminary round of the 2017 EAFF E-1 Football Championship.

== Career statistics ==
=== International ===
As of match played 4 July 2016

Appearances and goals by national team and year
National team	Year	Apps	Goals
Mongolia	2000	1	0
Mongolia	2001	0	0
Mongolia	2002	0	0
Mongolia	2003	3	0
Mongolia	2004	0	0
Mongolia	2005	3	0
Mongolia	2006	0	0
Mongolia	2007	4	0
Mongolia	2008	0	0
Mongolia	2009	5	0
Mongolia	2010	0	0
Mongolia	2011	4	0
Mongolia	2012	0	0
Mongolia	2013	0	0
Mongolia	2014	3	0
Mongolia	2015	2	0
Mongolia	2016	2	0
Total		21	0
