= Arif Mirzoýew =

Turkmen footballer

Personal information
- Date of birth: January 13, 1980 (age 46)
- Place of birth: Turkmen SSR, Soviet Union
- Position: Striker

Team information
- Current team: Balkan

Senior career*
Years	Team	Apps	(Gls)
2001–2002	Neftchi Baku	3	(0)
2002–2003	Nisa Aşgabat		
2003–2004	Qarabağ	4	(0)
2004	Nisa Aşgabat		
2005–2006	Navbahor Namangan	38	(23)
2007	Samarqand-Dinamo	13	(0)
2007–2008	Shurtan Guzar	21	(2)
2009–2010	Aşgabat		
2011–	Balkan		

International career^{‡}
2003–2009	Turkmenistan	21	(4)
- * Club domestic league appearances and goals as of 23 January 2017 ‡ National team caps and goals as of 23 January 2017

Arif Mirzoýew (born January 13, 1980) is a professional Turkmen football player, currently playing for FC Altyn Asyr.

== International career statistics ==
=== Goals for Senior National Team ===
#	Date	Venue	Opponent	Score	Result	Competition
1	November 18, 2007	Ashgabat, Turkmenistan	Hong Kong	3–0	Won	2010 FIFA World Cup qualification
2	October 10, 2008	Ho Chi Minh City, Vietnam	Vietnam	3–2	Won	Friendly
3	April 14, 2009	Malé, Maldives	Maldives	3–1	Won	2010 AFC Challenge Cup Qualification
4	April 16, 2009	Malé, Maldives	Bhutan	7–0	Won	2010 AFC Challenge Cup Qualification
