= Luvsandorjiin Sandagdorj =

Mongolian footballer and manager

Personal information
- Full name: Luvsandorjiin Sandagdorj; Лувсандоржийн Сандагдорж
- Date of birth: 25 October 1934 (age 92)
- Place of birth: Ulaanbaatar, Mongolia
- Position: Midfielder

International career
Years	Team	Apps	(Gls)
1958–1960	Mongolia		

Managerial career
- 1975–1999: Mongolia (consultant)
- 1989–1994: Zamchin FC
- 1995–1997: Monsol FC
- 1997–1998: Delger FC
- 1999–2000: Mongolia

Luvsandorjiin Sandagdorj (Mongolian: Лувсандоржийн Сандагдорж; born 25 October 1934 in Ulaanbaatar) is a Mongolian professional football manager. From February 1999 to January 2000 he was coach of the Mongolia national football team.

== Career ==
He made his international debut for Mongolia national football team in 1958. From 1975 until 1999, he worked as a consultant of the national football team in the Mongolian Football Federation. In 1989-1994, he coached the Zamchin FC. Later, he coached clubs Monsol FC and Delger FC. In 1999-2000, he was head coach of the Mongolia national football team, and then worked in the MFF Grassroots Football (1999-2007).

== Awards ==
- State Medal: 1999
- MFF Golden Crown Medal: 2009
