= Pavel Sevastyanov =

Personal information
- Full name: Pavel Aleksandrovich Sevastyanov
- Date of birth: May 19, 1904
- Place of birth: Moscow, Russian Empire
- Date of death: August 14, 1974 (aged 70)
- Place of death: Moscow, Soviet Union

Managerial career
- Years: Team
- 1958–1960: Mongolia

Pavel Aleksandrovich Sevastyanov (Russian: Павел Александрович Севастьянов; 19 May 1904 - 14 August 1974) was a Soviet professional football manager, since 1958 until 1960 a coach of Mongolia national football team. He died in Moscow on 14 August 1974.
