= Said Al-Sobakhi =

Palestinian footballer

Personal information
- Date of birth: 20 June 1985 (age 41)
- Place of birth: Rafah, Palestine
- Position: Striker

Team information
- Current team: Wadi Al-Nes
- Number: 8

Senior career*
Years	Team	Apps	(Gls)
–2008	Khadamat Rafah		
2008–	Wadi Al-Nes	21	(17)

International career
2008–	Palestine	7	(1)
- * Club domestic league appearances and goals

Said Al-Sobakhi (Arabic: سعيد السباخي; born 20 June 1985) is a Palestinian footballer who plays his club football for Wadi Al-Nes. He plays primarily as a striker.

== Club career ==
In October 2008, Al-Sobakhi moved from his Gaza-based club Khadamat Rafah to West Bank Premier League club Wadi Al-Nes. His first season proved to a very successful one.

== International career ==
Al-Sobakhi made his national team debut for Palestine during the 2008 WAFF Championship. During 2010 AFC Challenge Cup qualifying, Al-Sobakhi made his first start for the national team where he scored his first goal in a 1–1 draw with Kyrgyzstan.

=== International goals ===
Scores and results list Palestine's goal tally first.

#	Date	Venue	Opponent	Score	Result	Competition
1.	30 March 2009	Dasarath Rangasala Stadium, Kathmandu	Kyrgyzstan	1–1	1–1	2010 AFC Challenge Cup qualifier
