= Döwletmyrat Ataýew =

Turkmen footballer

Personal information
- Date of birth: March 16, 1983 (age 43)
- Place of birth: Ashgabat, Turkmenistan
- Height: 1.78 m (5 ft 10 in)
- Position: Striker

Senior career*
Years	Team	Apps	(Gls)
2002–2004	Nisa Aşgabat		
2005–2006	Navbahor Namangan	23	(2)
2007–2008	Shurtan Guzar		
2009	Aşgabat		
2009–2010	Karvan	24	(2)
2010	Shurtan Guzar	8	(0)

International career^{‡}
2004–	Turkmenistan	10	(3)
- * Club domestic league appearances and goals as of July 2009 ‡ National team caps and goals as of December 1, 2009

Döwletmyrat Ataýew (born March 16, 1983) is a professional Turkmen football player whose last known club was Shurtan Guzar.

== Career statistics ==
Club statistics
Season	Club	League	League		Cup		Other		Total	
Season	Club	League	App	Goals	App	Goals	App	Goals	App	Goals
Azerbaijan			League		Azerbaijan Cup		Europe		Total	
2009–10	Karvan	Azerbaijan Premier League	24	2			—		24	2
Total	Azerbaijan		24	2	0	0	0	0	24	2
Total			24	2	0	0	0	0	24	2

== International career statistics ==
=== Goals for Senior National Team ===
#	Date	Venue	Opponent	Score	Result	Competition
1	April 16, 2009	Malé, Maldives	Bhutan	7–0	Won	2010 AFC Challenge Cup Qualification
2	April 16, 2009	Malé, Maldives	Bhutan	7–0	Won	2010 AFC Challenge Cup Qualification
3	April 16, 2009	Malé, Maldives	Bhutan	7–0	Won	2010 AFC Challenge Cup Qualification
