= 1987 Mongolian National Championship =

Football league season in Mongolia

Mongolian National Championship
- Season: 1987
- Champions: Sükhbaatar

The 1987 Mongolian National Championship was the twenty-third recorded edition of the Mongolian National Championship for football, with the first tournament taking place in 1955 and no tournament held in 1965 or apparently in 1977. It would appear however that championships were contested between 1956 and 1963, as sources note that a team called Aldar, the Mongolian Army Sports Club, won the title on numerous occasions during that time. Nonetheless, the 1985 national championship was won for the first time by Sükhbaatar, a team representing Sükhbaatar District, one of nine Düüregs (districts) of the capital Ulaanbaatar. Strength, a team representing the Public Security Sports Association, finished as runners up, whilst a team representing October District in Ulaanbaatar finished in third place.

== Final ==
The complete structure of the season is unclear in the available sources, but it is known that Sükhbaatar won the championship following a final play-off match against Strength.

6 September 1987

Sükhbaatar	5–0	Strength
	Report
