= Tsagaantsooj Enkhtur =

Mongolian footballer

Personal information
- Full name: Tsagaantsooj Enkhtur
- Date of birth: October 17, 1970 (age 56)
- Place of birth: Mongolia
- Position: Defender

Team information
- Current team: Erchim

International career
Years	Team	Apps	(Gls)
2000–2001	Mongolia	5	(1)

Tsagaantsooj Enkhtur (born 17 October 1970) is a Mongolian international footballer. He made his first appearance for the Mongolia national football team in 2000.

== International goals ==
Scores and results list Mongolia's goal tally first.

#	Date	Venue	Opponent	Score	Result	Competition
1	28 February 2000	Pakhtakor Markaziy Stadium, Tashkent, Uzbekistan	Uzbekistan	1–1	1–8	Friendly
