= Amgalangiin Chinzorig =

Mongolian international footballer

Personal information
- Full name: Amgalangiin Chinzorig; Амгалангийн Чинзориг
- Date of birth: December 18, 1987 (age 38)
- Place of birth: Mongolia
- Position: Midfielder

Team information
- Current team: Ulaanbaatar University

Senior career*
Years	Team	Apps	(Gls)
2011–	Ulaanbaatar University		

International career
2011–	Mongolia	4	(0)
- * Club domestic league appearances and goals

Amgalangiin Chinzorig (Mongolian: Амгалангийн Чинзориг; born 18 December 1987) is a Mongolian international footballer. He has appeared 4 times for the Mongolia national football team.
