= Rastislav Božik =

Slovak football manager

Personal information
- Date of birth: 15 October 1977 (age 49)
- Place of birth: Nová Baňa, Slovakia

Managerial career
- Years: Team
- 2003–2005: FC Nitra (Youth)
- 2005–2006: Son Dong Tam Long An
- 2006–2010: Malaysia (Assistant)
- 2010–2011: Al Wahda
- 2011–2016: Malaysia (Assistant)
- 2016–2017: Al-Shaab (Technical Director)
- 2017–2019: FC Nitra (Assistant)
- 2019–2020: Mongolia U16
- 2019–2020: Mongolia U19
- 2020–2021: Mongolia
- 2021: Šamorín (Assistant)
- 2022-2025: FC Sabah (Assistant)
- 2025: Ružomberok (Assistant)
- 2026-: Šamorín (Assistant)

Rastislav Božik is a Slovak football manager who was most recently the fitness coach of the Malaysia Super League club Sabah.

== Career ==
Božik has coached in Slovakia, Vietnam, the United Arab Emirates, Malaysia, and Mongolia.
