= Gankhuyag Serodyanjiv =

Mongolian footballer

Personal information
- Full name: Serodyanjiv Gankhuyag; СэрОдЯнживийн Ганхуяг
- Date of birth: 6 September 1994 (age 32)
- Place of birth: Mongolia
- Position: Midfielder

Team information
- Current team: Khangarid
- Number: 17

Senior career*
Years	Team	Apps	(Gls)
2013–	Khangarid		(12)

International career^{‡}
2016–	Mongolia	8	(4)
- * Club domestic league appearances and goals as of 13:59, 2 September 2018 (UTC) ‡ National team caps and goals as of 01:27, 7 September 2018 (UTC)

Serodyanjiv Gankhuyag (born 6 September 1994) is a Mongolian footballer who plays as a midfielder for Mongolian Premier League club Khangarid and the Mongolian national team.

== Club career ==
Gankhuyag has played for the Khangarid FC since 2013.

== International career ==
Gankhuyag made his senior international debut on 3 November 2016 in a 2016 AFC Solidarity Cup match against Macau. He also competed with the under-23 team at the 2017 Aceh World Solidarity Tsunami Cup.

=== International goals ===
Score and result list Mongolia's goal tally first.

#	Date	Venue	Opponent	Score	Result	Competition
1	22 March 2018	Bukit Jalil National Stadium, Bukit Jalil, Malaysia	Malaysia	2–2	2–2	Friendly
2	2 September 2018	MFF Football Centre, Ulaanbaatar, Mongolia	Macau	1–0	4–1	2019 EAFF E-1 Football Championship qualification
3	4 September 2018	MFF Football Centre, Ulaanbaatar, Mongolia	Northern Mariana Islands	3–0	9–0	2019 EAFF E-1 Football Championship qualification
4	4 September 2018	MFF Football Centre, Ulaanbaatar, Mongolia	Northern Mariana Islands	5–0	9–0	2019 EAFF E-1 Football Championship qualification
Last updated 4 September 2018

=== International career statistics ===
As of match played 6 September 2018

Mongolia national team
Year	Apps	Goals
2016	2	0
2017	1	0
2018	4	4
Total	8	4
