= Safiullah Khan =

Pakistani footballer (born 1979)

Personal information
- Full name: Safiullah Khan
- Date of birth: 13 March 1979 (age 47)
- Place of birth: Dir, Pakistan
- Height: 1.83 m (6 ft 0 in)
- Position: Forward

Senior career*
Years	Team	Apps	(Gls)
2000–2001	PTCL		
2001–2004	Allied Bank		
2006–2008	Pak Elektron		
2009–2011	Khan Research Laboratories		

International career
2005–2009	Pakistan	12	(5)
- * Club domestic league appearances and goals

Safiullah Khan (Urdu, Pashto: صفی اللہ خان; born 13 March 1979) is a Pakistani former footballer who played as a forward. Khan made his international debut in 2005, and won the highest goal-scorer award in the 2010 AFC Challenge Cup qualifiers, where he finished as the top-scorer with 5 goals. He is the first Pakistani player to score four goals in a single international match.

== Early life ==
Khan was born in Dir, in the North-West Frontier Province of Pakistan on 13 March 1979.

== Club career ==
=== Early career ===
Khan started his career with departmental side PTCL in 2000. After a year, he moved to Allied Bank, where he lastly participated in the inaugural 2004–05 Pakistan Premier League, where the team was dissolved at the end of the season.

=== Pak Elektron ===
Khan moved to Pak Elektron in 2006, where he helped the team achieve the promotion to the top-tier after winning the 2007–08 PFF League.

=== Khan Research Laboratories ===
In 2009, Khan moved to Khan Research Laboratories, winning the 2009–10 Pakistan Premier League and the National Challenge Cup in 2009, 2010, and 2011.

== International career ==
Khan debut was on 16 June 2005 which was the second game in a series of three games against India, the game finished 1–0 loss to Pakistan. After a three-year absence Khan was selected to play in an AFC Challenge Cup qualifier against Brunei on April 6, 2009. In the match he scored four goals with the game finishing 6–0 in Pakistan's favour, becoming at the time, the first in Pakistan soccer history to score four goals in an international fixture. With 5 total goals, he finished as joint top scorer of the qualification round along with Kasun Jayasuriya. On 8 April 2009 in the same competition Khan scored again in the 2–2 draw against Sri Lanka.

== Post-retirement ==
After retirement, Khan participated in the AFC Future Coaches Project programme in 2008 and 2010 under Gyorgy Kottan in Spain. He later joined University of Agriculture in Peshawar as Assistant Director Sports.

In 2014, he also participated in the FATA International Peace Football Cup with the Khyber Pakhtunkhwa football team.

== Career statistics ==
=== International ===
Appearances and goals by national team and year
National team	Year	Apps	Goals
Pakistan	2005	3	0
Pakistan	2006	1	0
Pakistan	2009	8	5
Total		12	5

Scores and results list Pakistan's goal tally first, score column indicates score after each Khan goal.

List of international goals scored by Safiullah Khan
No.	Date	Venue	Opponent	Score	Result	Competition
1	6 April 2009	Sugathadasa Stadium, Colombo, Sri Lanka	Brunei	0–1	0–6	2010 AFC Challenge Cup qualification
2	6 April 2009	Sugathadasa Stadium, Colombo, Sri Lanka	Brunei	0–3	0–6	2010 AFC Challenge Cup qualification
3	6 April 2009	Sugathadasa Stadium, Colombo, Sri Lanka	Brunei	0–4	0–6	2010 AFC Challenge Cup qualification
4	6 April 2009	Sugathadasa Stadium, Colombo, Sri Lanka	Brunei	0–5	0–6	2010 AFC Challenge Cup qualification
5	8 April 2009	Sugathadasa Stadium, Colombo, Sri Lanka	Sri Lanka	1–1	2–2	2010 AFC Challenge Cup qualification

== Honours ==
=== Pak Elektron ===
- Football Federation League: 2007–08

=== Khan Research Laboratories ===
- Pakistan Premier League: 2009–10
- Pakistan National Football Challenge Cup: 2009, 2010, 2011

== See also ==
- List of Pakistan national football team hat-tricks
