= Narmandakh Artag =

Mongolian footballer

Personal information
- Full name: Narmandakh Artag; Артагийн Нармандах
- Date of birth: 8 March 1997 (age 29)
- Place of birth: Mongolia
- Position: Midfielder

Team information
- Current team: Ulaanbaatar City FC
- Number: 14

Senior career*
Years	Team	Apps	(Gls)
–2018	Deren FC		
2018–	Ulaanbaatar City FC		

International career^{‡}
2018–	Mongolia	17	(3)
- * Club domestic league appearances and goals as of 22:13, 16 November 2018 (UTC) ‡ National team caps and goals as of 23:35, 30 March 2021 (UTC)

Artagiin Narmandakh (Mongolian: Артагийн Нармандах; born 8 March 1997) is a Mongolian footballer who plays as a midfielder for Mongolian Premier League club Ulaanbaatar City and the Mongolian national team.

== International career ==
Narmandakh made his senior international debut on 2 September 2018 in a 2019 EAFF E-1 Football Championship match against Macau.

=== International goals ===
Score and result list Mongolia's goal tally first.

#	Date	Venue	Opponent	Score	Result	Competition
1.	16 October 2018	New Laos National Stadium, Vientiane, Laos	Laos	2–1	4–1	Friendly
2.	16 November 2018	Taipei Municipal Stadium, Taipei, Taiwan	Hong Kong	1–2	1–5	2019 EAFF E-1 Football Championship qualification
3.	14 November 2019	Olympic Stadium, Phnom Penh, Cambodia	Cambodia	1–0	1–1	Friendly
Last updated 18 November 2018

=== International career statistics ===
As of match played 14 November 2019

Mongolia national team
Year	Apps	Goals
2018	7	2
2019	6	1
Total	13	3
