= Asmeer Lathif Mohamed =

Sri Lankan footballer

Personal information
- Full name: Mohamed Asmeer Lathif Mohamed
- Date of birth: 3 May 1983 (age 43)
- Place of birth: Colombo, Sri Lanka

Senior career*
Years	Team	Apps	(Gls)
2001–2003	Negombo Youth SC		
2003–2004	Ratnam SC		
2004–2007	Negombo Youth SC		
2007–2008	Ratnam SC		
2008–2009	Negombo Youth SC		
2009–2013	Blue Star SC		

International career
1999–2009	Sri Lanka	33	(1)
- * Club domestic league appearances and goals

Asmeer Lathif Mohamed (born May 3, 1983) is a Sri Lankan former footballer who played for Negombo Youth SC in Negombo and the Sri Lanka national football team.
