= Norjmoogiin Tsedenbal =

Mongolian footballer

Tsedenbal Norjmoo
Personal information
- Full name: Norjmoogiin Tsedenbal
- Date of birth: 12 September 1988 (age 38)
- Place of birth: Mongolia
- Height: 1.78 m (5 ft 10 in)
- Positions: Left-back; wing-back

Team information
- Current team: Ulaanbaatar City
- Number: 23

Senior career*
Years	Team	Apps	(Gls)
2006–2014	Ulaanbaataryn Unaganuud		
2014–2015	Selenge Press		
2015–2017	Ulaanbaataryn Unaganuud		
2017–	Ulaanbaatar City FC		

International career^{‡}
2009–	Mongolia	35	(7)
- * Club domestic league appearances and goals ‡ National team caps and goals as of 23:59, 30 March 2021 (UTC)

Norjmoogiin Tsedenbal (Mongolian: Норжмоогийн Цэдэнбал; born 12 September 1988) is a Mongolian footballer who plays as a defender for Mongolian Premier League club Ulaanbaatar City and the Mongolian national team.

== Career ==
In March 2017 he joined Mongolia Premier League club Ulaanbaatar City FC on a 2-year contract.

Tsedenbal scored the first goal worldwide in 2022 FIFA World Cup qualification, opening the scoring against Brunei with a ninth minute free kick in the first leg of the first round of AFC Qualifiers on 6 June 2019.

=== International goals ===
Scores and results list Mongolia's goal tally first.

No.	Date	Venue	Opponent	Score	Result	Competition
1.	13 March 2009	Leo Palace Resort, Yona, Guam	Macau	1–0	2–1	2010 East Asian Football Championship qualification
2.	15 March 2009	Leo Palace Resort, Yona, Guam	Northern Mariana Islands	3–0	4–1	2010 East Asian Football Championship qualification
3.	6 September 2018	MFF Football Centre, Ulaanbaatar, Mongolia	Guam	1–1	1–1	2019 EAFF E-1 Football Championship qualification
4.	13 November 2018	Taipei Municipal Stadium, Taipei, Taiwan	Chinese Taipei	1–2	1–2	2019 EAFF E-1 Football Championship qualification
5.	6 June 2019	MFF Football Centre, Ulaanbaatar, Mongolia	Brunei	1–0	2–0	2022 FIFA World Cup qualification
6.	11 June 2019	Hassanal Bolkiah National Stadium, Bandar Seri Begawan, Brunei	Brunei	1–2	1–2	2022 FIFA World Cup qualification
7.	15 October 2019	MFF Football Centre, Ulaanbaatar, Mongolia	Kyrgyzstan	1–2	1–2	2022 FIFA World Cup qualification
