= Boldyn Buman-Uchral =

Mongolian footballer

Personal information
- Full name: Boldyn Buman-Uchral; Болдын Буман-Учрал
- Date of birth: May 29, 1971 (age 55)
- Place of birth: Mongolia
- Position: Forward

Team information
- Current team: Khangarid

Senior career*
Years	Team	Apps	(Gls)
1990–2007	Khangarid	68	(10)

International career
2000–2005	Mongolia	10	(3)
- * Club domestic league appearances and goals

Boldyn Buman-Uchral (Mongolian: Болдын Буман-Учрал; born 29 May 1971) is a Mongolian international footballer. He made his first appearance for the Mongolia national football team in the year 2000.
