= 2019 EAFF E-1 Football Championship =

2019년 EAFF E-1 풋볼 챔피언십

Tournament details
- Host country: South Korea
- City: Busan
- Dates: 10–18 December
- Teams: 4 (from 1 sub-confederation)
- Venues: 2 (in 1 host cities)

Final positions
- Champions: South Korea (5th title)
- Runners-up: Japan
- Third place: China
- Fourth place: Hong Kong

Tournament statistics
- Matches played: 6
- Goals scored: 14 (2.33 per match)
- Attendance: 42,181 (7,030 per match)
- Top scorer: (Japan) Koki Ogawa (3 goals)
- Best player: (South Korea) Hwang In-beom
- Best goalkeeper: (South Korea) Kim Seung-gyu

The 2019 EAFF E-1 Football Championship was the 8th edition of the EAFF E-1 Football Championship, an international football tournament for East Asian countries and territories organized by the EAFF. The finals were held in South Korea in December 2019. It was the nation's third time hosting the tournament.

== Teams ==
Ten teams were allocated to their particular stage. Each winner of the preliminary round progressed to the next stage.

Final Round	Second Preliminary Round	First Preliminary Round
South Korea (hosts); Japan; China	North Korea; Chinese Taipei (hosts); Hong Kong	Guam; Macau; Mongolia (hosts); Northern Mariana Islands (non-FIFA member)

== Venues ==
Preliminary Round
(Mongolia) Ulaanbaatar	(Chinese Taipei) Taipei
MFF Football Centre	Taipei Municipal Stadium
Capacity: 5,000	Capacity: 20,000
Final Round
(South Korea) Busan
Busan Asiad Main Stadium	Busan Gudeok Stadium
Capacity: 53,769	Capacity: 12,349

== Tiebreakers ==
The ranking of teams was determined as follows:

1. Points in head-to-head matches among tied teams;
2. Goal difference in head-to-head matches among tied teams;
3. Goals scored in head-to-head matches among tied teams;
4. If more than two teams are tied, and after applying all head-to-head criteria above, a subset of teams are still tied, all head-to-head criteria above are reapplied exclusively to this subset of teams;
5. Goal difference in all group matches;
6. Goals scored in all group matches;
7. Penalty shoot-out if only two teams are tied and they met in the last round of the group;
8. Disciplinary points (yellow card = 1 point, red card as a result of two yellow cards = 3 points, direct red card = 3 points, yellow card followed by direct red card = 4 points);
9. Drawing of lots.

== First preliminary round ==
The first preliminary round was held in Mongolia in September 2018.

=== Table ===
Pos	Team	Pld	W	D	L	GF	GA	GD	Pts	Qualification
1	Mongolia (H)	3	2	1	0	14	2	+12	7	Advance to Second preliminary round
2	Macau	3	1	1	1	4	5	−1	4 (Note: Head-to-head result: Macau 2–0 Guam.)	
3	Guam	3	1	1	1	5	3	+2	4	
4	Northern Mariana Islands	3	0	1	2	1	14	−13	1	

Source: EAFF.com
(H) Hosts

=== Matches ===
- All times are local (UTC+8).
2 September 2018
13:00

Guam	4–0	Northern Mariana Islands
Mendiola 13'; Lopez 26', 68'; Cunliffe 65'	Report

MFF Football Centre, Ulaanbaatar
Attendance: 105
Referee: Gu Chunhan (China)
2 September 2018
17:00

Mongolia	4–1	Macau
Seo-Od-Yanjiv 40'; Janchiv 45'; Batbold 74'; Naranbold 83'	Report	Leonel 48'

MFF Football Centre, Ulaanbaatar
Attendance: 1,654
Referee: Kim Woo-sung (South Korea)

4 September 2018
13:00

Macau	2–0	Guam
Lam Ka Seng 14'; Leong Ka Hang 78'	Report

MFF Football Centre, Ulaanbaatar
Attendance: 106
Referee: Kao Jung-fang (Chinese Taipei)
4 September 2018
17:00

Mongolia	9–0	Northern Mariana Islands
Mönkh-Erdengiin 11', 14'; Seo-Od-Yanjiv 25', 54'; Temuujin 39'; Batbold 71', 78'; Marakthan 85'; Orkhon 89'	Report

MFF Football Centre, Ulaanbaatar
Attendance: 2,021
Referee: Luk Kin Sun (Hong Kong)

6 September 2018
13:00

Northern Mariana Islands	1–1	Macau
Tenorio 33'	Report	Leong Ka Hang 19'

MFF Football Centre, Ulaanbaatar
Attendance: 17
Referee: Luk Kin Sun (Hong Kong)
6 September 2018
17:00

Mongolia	1–1	Guam
Tsedenbal 90+4'	Report	Mendiola 89'

MFF Football Centre, Ulaanbaatar
Attendance: 1,521
Referee: Kim Woo-sung (South Korea)

=== Awards ===
Top scorer	Most Valuable Player
(Mongolia) Baljinnyam Batbold	(Mongolia) Norjmoogiin Tsedenbal

== Second preliminary round ==
The second preliminary round was held in Taiwan in November 2018.

=== Table ===
Pos	Team	Pld	W	D	L	GF	GA	GD	Pts	Qualification
1	Hong Kong	3	2	1	0	7	2	+5	7	Advance to Final round
2	North Korea	3	2	1	0	6	1	+5	7	
3	Chinese Taipei (H)	3	1	0	2	3	5	−2	3	
4	Mongolia	3	0	0	3	3	11	−8	0	

Source: EAFF.com
(H) Hosts

=== Matches ===
- All times are local (UTC+8).
11 November 2018
14:10

North Korea	4–1	Mongolia
Rim Kwang-hyok 8', 54'; Kim Yu-song 29'; Jong Il-gwan 64'	Report	Nyam-Osoryn 74'

Taipei Municipal Stadium, Taipei
Attendance: 125
Referee: Minoru Tōjō (Japan)
11 November 2018
18:10

Chinese Taipei	1–2	Hong Kong
Chen Ting-yang 81'	Report	McKee 65'; Chung Wai Keung 84'

Taipei Municipal Stadium, Taipei
Attendance: 1,793
Referee: Chae Sang-hyeop (South Korea)

13 November 2018
15:10

Hong Kong	0–0	North Korea
	Report

Taipei Municipal Stadium, Taipei
Attendance: 228
Referee: Dwi Purba Adi Wicaksana (Indonesia)
13 November 2018
19:10

Chinese Taipei	2–1	Mongolia
Chu En-le 8', 10'	Report	Norjmoogiin 62'

Taipei Municipal Stadium, Taipei
Attendance: 1,157
Referee: Razlan Joffri Ali (Malaysia)

16 November 2018
15:10

Mongolia	1–5	Hong Kong
Artag 50'	Report	Sandro 24', 57'; McKee 36'; Baise 83'; Akande 87'

Taipei Municipal Stadium, Taipei
Attendance: 263
Referee: Chae Sang-hyeop (South Korea)
16 November 2018
19:10

Chinese Taipei	0–2	North Korea
	Report	Jong Il-gwan 48'; Jang Kuk-chol 73'

Taipei Municipal Stadium, Taipei
Attendance: 2,016
Referee: Minoru Tōjō (Japan)

=== Awards ===
Top scorer	Most Valuable Player
(North Korea) Rim Kwang-hyok	(Hong Kong) Huang Yang

== Final round ==
The final round was held in Busan, South Korea between 10 and 18 December 2019.

=== Table ===
Pos	Team	Pld	W	D	L	GF	GA	GD	Pts	Result
1	South Korea (C, H)	3	3	0	0	4	0	+4	9	Champions
2	Japan	3	2	0	1	7	2	+5	6	Runners-up
3	China	3	1	0	2	3	3	0	3	Third place
4	Hong Kong	3	0	0	3	0	9	−9	0	Fourth place

Source: EAFF.com
(C) Champions; (H) Hosts

=== Matches ===
10 December 2019
19:30

China	1–2	Japan
Dong Xuesheng 90'	Report	Suzuki 29'; Miura 70'

Busan Gudeok Stadium, Busan
Attendance: 800
Referee: Ilgiz Tantashev (Uzbekistan)
11 December 2019
19:30

South Korea	2–0	Hong Kong
Hwang In-beom 45+1'; Na Sang-ho 82'	Report

Busan Asiad Main Stadium, Busan
Attendance: 1,070
Referee: Shaun Evans (Australia)

14 December 2019
19:30

Japan	5–0	Hong Kong
Suga 8'; Tagawa 14'; Ogawa 26', 45+1', 58'	Report

Busan Gudeok Stadium, Busan
Attendance: 1,276
Referee: Mohd Amirul Izwan Yaacob (Malaysia)
15 December 2019
19:30

South Korea	1–0	China
Kim Min-jae 13'	Report

Busan Asiad Main Stadium, Busan
Attendance: 7,916
Referee: Muhammad Taqi (Singapore)

18 December 2019
16:15

Hong Kong	0–2	China
	Report	Ji Xiang 8'; Zhang Xizhe 71' (pen.)

Busan Asiad Main Stadium, Busan
Attendance: 1,867
Referee: Sivakorn Pu-udom (Thailand)
18 December 2019
19:30

South Korea	1–0	Japan
Hwang In-beom 28'	Report

Busan Asiad Main Stadium, Busan
Attendance: 29,252
Referee: Ilgiz Tantashev (Uzbekistan)
- All times are local (UTC+9).

=== Awards ===
Best goalkeeper	Best defender	Top scorer	Most Valuable Player
(South Korea) Kim Seung-gyu	(South Korea) Kim Min-jae	(Japan) Koki Ogawa	(South Korea) Hwang In-beom

=== Goalscorers ===
3 goals

- (Japan) Koki Ogawa

2 goals

- (South Korea) Hwang In-beom

1 goal

- (China) Dong Xuesheng
- (China) Ji Xiang
- (China) Zhang Xizhe
- (Japan) Genta Miura
- (Japan) Daiki Suga
- (Japan) Musashi Suzuki
- (Japan) Kyosuke Tagawa
- (South Korea) Kim Min-jae
- (South Korea) Na Sang-ho

== Final ranking ==
Pos	Team	Pld	W	D	L	GF	GA	GD	Pts	Final result
1	South Korea	3	3	0	0	4	0	+4	9	Champions
2	Japan	3	2	0	1	7	2	+5	6	Runners-up
3	China	3	1	0	2	3	3	0	3	Third Place
4	Hong Kong	6	2	1	3	7	11	−4	7	Fourth Place
5	North Korea	3	2	1	0	6	1	+5	7	Eliminated in Second Preliminary Round
6	Chinese Taipei	3	1	0	2	3	5	−2	3	Eliminated in Second Preliminary Round
7	Mongolia	6	2	1	3	17	13	+4	7	Eliminated in Second Preliminary Round
8	Macau	3	1	1	1	4	5	−1	4	Eliminated in First Preliminary Round
9	Guam	3	1	1	1	5	3	+2	4	Eliminated in First Preliminary Round
10	Northern Mariana Islands	3	0	1	2	1	14	−13	1	Eliminated in First Preliminary Round

Updated to match(es) played on 18 December 2019. Source: EAFF.com

Per statistical convention in football, matches decided in extra time are counted as wins and losses, while matches decided by penalty shoot-out are counted as draws.

== Broadcasting rights ==
- China – CCTV-5+, PPTV
- Guam – KGTF
- Hong Kong – Cable TV, Fantastic Television
- Japan – Fuji TV
- Macau – TDM
- Mongolia – MNB
- (Northern Mariana Islands) NMI – KTGM
- North Korea – KCTV
- South Korea – SPOTV, MBN (South Korean male national team matches only)
