= 1968 Mongolian National Championship =

Football league season in Mongolia

Mongolian National Championship
- Season: 1968
- Champions: Darkhan

The 1968 Mongolian National Championship was the fifth recorded edition of the Mongolian National Championship for football, with the first tournament taking place in 1955 and no tournament held in 1965. It would appear however that championships were contested between 1956 and 1963, as sources note that a team called Aldar, the Mongolian Army Sports Club, won the title on numerous occasions during that time. Nonetheless, the 1968 national championship was won by Darkhan, representing the city of Darkhan, the capital of Darkhan-Uul Aimag, their first title.
