= 1970 Mongolian National Championship =

Football league season in Mongolia

Mongolian National Championship
- Season: 1970
- Champions: Aldar

The 1970 Mongolian National Championship was the seventh recorded edition of the Mongolian National Championship for football, with the first tournament taking place in 1955 and no tournament held in 1965. It would appear however that championships were contested between 1956 and 1963, as sources note that Aldar, (literally: Glory) the Mongolian Army Sports Club, won the title on numerous occasions during that time. Nonetheless, the 1970 national championship was won by Aldar, their first recorded title. Aldar went unbeaten throughout the entire season, with Khuldumur finishing as runners up and Darkhan in third place. The official best players for the championship included: Baigal, Bayanjargal, Sagar (all Aldar), Emel, Grish, Purevjal (all Darkhan), Samdan (Khudulmur).
