= Soyol =

Soyol Соёл
- Ulus
- Location within Republic of Buryatia Location within Russia
- Coordinates: 53°51′N 110°11′E
- Country: Russia
- Region: Republic of Buryatia
- District: Barguzinsky District
- Time zone: UTC+8:00

Soyol (Russian: Соёл) is a rural locality (an ulus) in Barguzinsky District, Republic of Buryatia, Russia. The population was 145 as of 2010. There is 1 street.

== Geography ==
Soyol is located 75 km northeast of Barguzin (the district's administrative centre) by road. Borogol is the nearest rural locality.
