= Ganbaataryn Tögsbayar =

Mongolian footballer

Personal information
- Full name: Ganbaataryn Tögsbayar; Ганбаатарын Төгсбаяр
- Date of birth: May 13, 1985 (age 41)
- Place of birth: Ulaanbaatar, Mongolia
- Height: 1.74 m (5 ft 9 in)
- Position: Forward

Team information
- Current team: Selenge Press

Senior career*
Years	Team	Apps	(Gls)
2003–2004	Erchim	13	(7)
2005–2006	Khoromkhon		
2007–2008	Erchim		(15)
2009–	Selenge Press		(15)

International career
2003–2015	Mongolia	24	(6)
- * Club domestic league appearances and goals

Ganbaataryn Tögsbayar (Mongolian: Ганбаатарын Төгсбаяр; born on 13 May 1985) is a Mongolian footballer who plays as a striker for Selenge Press in Mongolia. He is a member and the second top goalscorer of the Mongolia national football team.

== International goals ==
No.	Date	Venue	Opponent	Score	Result	Competition
1.	24 February 2003	Causeway Bay, Hong Kong	Guam	1–0	2–0	2003 East Asian Football Championship
2.	25 April 2003	Thimphu, Bhutan	Guam	2–0	6–0	2004 AFC Asian Cup qualification
3.	25 April 2003	Thimphu, Bhutan	Guam	3–0	6–0	2004 AFC Asian Cup qualification
4.	25 April 2003	Thimphu, Bhutan	Guam	4–0	6–0	2004 AFC Asian Cup qualification
5.	9 March 2005	Taipei, Taiwan	Guam	1–0	4–1	2005 East Asian Football Championship
6.	9 March 2005	Taipei, Taiwan	Guam	2–0	4–1	2005 East Asian Football Championship
