= Davaagiin Bayarzorig =

Mongolian international footballer

Personal information
- Full name: Davaagiin Bayarzorig; Даваагийн Баярзориг
- Date of birth: August 3, 1975 (age 51)
- Place of birth: Mongolia
- Position: Forward

Team information
- Current team: Khangarid

Senior career*
Years	Team	Apps	(Gls)
2003–	Khangarid	12	(24)

International career
2000–2007	Mongolia	19	(4)
- * Club domestic league appearances and goals

Davaagiin Bayarzorig (Mongolian: Даваагийн Баярзориг; born 3 August 1975) is a Mongolian international footballer. He made his first appearance for the Mongolia national football team in 2000.
