= Mongolian Premier League =

Association football league in Mongolia

- Founded: 1955; 71 years ago
- Country: Mongolia
- Confederation: AFC
- Number of clubs: 10
- Level on pyramid: 1
- Relegation to: Mongolian First League
- Domestic cup(s): MFF Cup; Mongolia Super Cup
- International cup: AFC Challenge League
- Current champions: FC Ulaanbaatar (3rd title)
- Most championships: Erchim FC (13 titles)
- Top scorer: (Mongolia) Nyam-Osor Naranbold (204 goals)
- Website: the-mff.mn
- Current: 2026 MFF Developmental League interim season

The Mongolian Premier League (Монголын Үндэсний Дээд Лиг) is the top-tier professional football league of Mongolia. It is contested by ten clubs and operates on a system of promotion and relegation with the 1st League. The league is controlled by the Mongolian Football Federation.

The inaugural season started in 1955. Seasons start in late April and last until late October or early November because of the low temperatures in the winter, with each championship corresponding to a calendar year. Teams play 18 matches each (playing each team in the league twice, home and away), totalling 90 matches in the season.

== Format ==
The National League is a standalone football competition, that operates as the highest level of football in Mongolia. It consists of ten teams, eight of which are based in the capital city, Ulaanbaatar, with the remainder coming from other districts. Competing teams in the league play each other twice on a home and away basis. 6 of the Ulaanbaatar-located teams play at the MFF Football Centre, and the others are: Mongolian largest stadium, National Sports Stadium, G-Mobile Arena, Erchim Stadium & Erdenet Stadium.

Three points are gained for a win and one for a draw with no points for a loss. The team with the highest number of points is declared the champion. If two teams finish on equal points then head-to-head is used to determine the winner, with goals scored being the next criterion considered if goal difference cannot separate the teams.

There is no promotion, because it is the top-tier league in Mongolia but there is relegation. The last-placed 2 teams are automatically relegated to Mongolia 1st League, without a play-off match.

== History ==
Football matches were introduced in 1946 in Mongolia. Then the first official championship was held in 1955, named "Mongolian National Championship". Later in 1996, the league name changed to "Mongolian National Premier League".

Information from the 1950s to the 2000 such as results and teams are not known, only the winners (some runner-ups and third placed teams) are known. There are many teams in Mongolian football leagues history, including Soyol, Khudulmur and Tengeriin Bugnuud.

== Clubs ==
The following clubs will compete in the Mongolian Premier League in 2026.

- Amtat FC
- Central Stallions
- Deren FC
- Erchim FC
- FC Ulaanbaatar
- Hunters FC
- Khovd Western FC
- Khovdyn Khuleguud
- Ulaangom City

== Champions ==
=== As National Championship ===
Season	Champions	Runner-up	Third place
1955	Soyol (1)	Soyol-2nd team	
1956–63	not known		
1964	Khudulmur (1)		
1965	not held		
1966	Khudulmur (2)		
1967	Tengeriin Bugnuud (1)		
1968	Darkhan-Uul (1)		
1969	Tengeriin Bugnuud (2)		
1970	Aldar (1)	Khudulmur	Darkhan-Uul
1971	Tengeriin Bugnuud (3)		
1972	Khudulmur (3)		
1973	Tengeriin Bugnuud (4)		
1974	Aldar (2)	Zamchin	Darkhan-Uul
1975	Tengeriin Bugnuud (5)		
1976	Aldar (3)		
1977	not played		
1978	Zamchin (1)		
1979	Tengeriin Bugnuud (6)		
1980	Aldar (4)		
1981	Tengeriin Bugnuud (7)		
1982	Tengeriin Bugnuud (8)		
1983	Ajilchin (1)		
1984	Tengeriin Bugnuud (9)		
1985	Khuch (1)	Friendship Darkhan	Khudulmur
1986	Nairamdal (1)		
1987	Sükhbataar (1)	Strength	October District
1988	Sükhbataar (2)		
1989	Khudulmur (4)	Sükhbataar	
1990	Khuch (2)		
1991	Sor (1)		
1992	Idsskh (1)		
1993	Udriin-Od (1)		
1994	Khuch (3)		
1995	Idsskh (2)		

=== MFF League ===
Season	Champions	Runner-up	Third place
1996	Erchim (1)	Biznesijn Cengeruud	Tasyn Suudal
1997	Delger (1)	Erchim	ITR Bank
1998	Erchim (2)	Delger	Dinozavr
1999	ITI Bank-Bars (1)	Erchim	Bajangol
2000	Erchim (3)	Sonor	Bajangol
2001	Khangarid (1)	Mon-Uran	Sonor
2002	Erchim (4)	Khangarid	Darkhan-Uul & Mon-Uran
2003	Khangarid (2)	Mon-Uran	Erchim
2004	Khangarid (3)	Khoromkhon	Odriin-Od
2005	Khoromkhon (1)	Khangarid	Mazaalai
2006	Khasiin Khulguud (1)	Khoromkhon	Khangarid
2007	Erchim (5)	Khangarid	Khoromkhon
2008	Erchim (6)	Khoromkhon	Khasiin Khulguud
2009	Ulaanbaatar DS (1)	Erchim	Khasiin Khulguud
2010	Khangarid (4)	Mazaalai	Ulaanbaatar DS
2011	Ulaanbaatar (1)	Ulaanbaatar DS	Khasiin Khulguud
2012	Erchim (7)	Khoromkhon	Ulaanbaatar DS
2013	Erchim (8)	Khangarid	Ulaanbaatar IS
2014	Khoromkhon (2)	Erchim	Khangarid
2015	Erchim (9)	Ulaanbaatar	Selenge Press
2016	Erchim (10)	Khangarid	Khoromkhon
2017	Erchim (11)	Ulaanbaatar City	Athletic 220
2018	Erchim (12)	Ulaanbaatar	Anduud City
2019	Ulaanbaatar City (1)	Erchim	Khangarid
2020	Athletic 220 (1)	Ulaanbaatar	Khangarid
2021	Athletic 220 (2)	Deren	Selenge Press Falcons
2021–22	Khaan Khuns-Erchim (13)	Ulaanbaatar	Ulaanbaatar City
2022–23	Ulaanbaatar (2)	Deren	Selenge Press Falcons
2023–24	Selenge Press Falcons (1)	Khangarid	Deren
2024–25	Selenge Press Falcons (2)	Khangarid	FC Ulaanbaatar
2025–26	FC Ulaanbaatar (3)	Central Stallions FC	Deren
2026 (Interim)			

== Performances ==
2025–26 teams marked in bold.

Club	Winners	Winning seasons
Erchim	13	1996, 1998, 2000, 2002, 2007, 2008, 2012, 2013, 2015, 2016, 2017, 2018, 2021–22
Tengeriin Bugnuud	9	1967, 1969, 1971, 1973, 1975, 1979, 1981, 1982, 1984
Aldar	4	1970, 1974, 1976, 1980
Khudulmur	4	1964, 1966, 1972, 1989
**Khangarid**	4	2001, 2003, 2004, 2010
Khuch	3	1985, 1990, 1994
**Ulaanbaatar**	3	2011, 2022–23 2025–26
Sükhbataar	2	1987, 1988
Idsskh	2	1992, 1995
**Khoromkhon**	2	2005, 2014
Athletic 220	2	2020, 2021
**Selenge Press Falcons**	2	2023–24, 2024–25
Soyol	1	1955
Darkhan-Uul	1	1968
Zamchin	1	1978
Ajilchin	1	1983
Nairamdal	1	1986
Sor	1	1991
Udriin-Od	1	1993
Delger	1	1997
ITI Bank-Bars	1	1999
Khasiin Khulguud	1	2006
Ulaanbaataryn Unaganuud	1	2009
Ulaanbaatar City	1	2019

== Top goalscorers ==
Season	Goalscorers	Team	Goals
2003	(Mongolia) Davaagiin Bayarzorig	Khangarid	24
2007	(Mongolia) Dagva Enkhtaivan	Khasiin Khulguud	26
2008	(Mongolia) Ganbaataryn Togsbayar	Erchim	15
2009	(Mongolia) Ganbaataryn Togsbayar	Falcons	15
2012	(Mongolia) Tsedenbalyn Tümenjargal	Unaganuud	15
2015	(Mongolia) Nyam-Osor Naranbold	Khoromkhon	23
2016	(Mongolia) Oyunbaatar Mijiddorj	Khangarid	29
2017	(Mongolia) Nyam-Osor Naranbold	Athletic 220	15
2018	(Japan) Tatasuya Nishio	Deren	16
2019	(Ivory Coast) David Saviola	Falcons	34
2020	(Mongolia) Nyam-Osor Naranbold	Athletic 220	29
2021	(Japan) Tetsuaki Misawa	Lions	17
2021–22	(Japan) Yuta Mishima	Erchim	26
2022–23	(Mongolia) Batkhyag Munkh-Erdene	Khovd	38
2023–24	(Mongolia) Nyam-Osor Naranbold	Khoromkhon	25
2023–24	(Brazil) Vlademir Everton	Falcons	25
2024–25	(Japan) Yuraro Funami	Deren	31
2025–26	(South Korea) Min Ki-Tae	Hunters	24

Most time topscorer

- 4 times:
  - (Mongolia) Nyam-Osor Naranbold (2015, 2017, 2020, 2023–24)

Most goals in a single season

- 38 goals:
  - (Mongolia) Batkhiag Mönkh-Erdene (2022–23).

Most goals by a player in a single game

- 11 goals:
  - (Ivory Coast) David Saviola (Falcons) 1-13 against Khoromkhon, 23 October 2019.

=== All-time goalscorers ===
Rank	Player	Goals	Years
1	(Mongolia) Nyam-Osor Naranbold	204	2008
2	(Mongolia) Tsedenbalyn Tümenjargal	194	2009

=== All-time clean sheets ===
Rank	Player	Clean sheets	Years
1	(Mongolia) Mönkh-Erdene Enkhtaivan	42	2017
2	(Mongolia) Ariunbold Batsaikhan	39	2011

== Multiple hat-tricks ==
Rank	Country	Player	Hat-tricks
1	(Mongolia)	Tsedenbalyn Tümenjargal	13
2	(Mongolia)	Nyam-Osor Naranbold	9
3	(Mongolia)	Batkhuyag Monkh-Erdene	5
3	(Japan)	Akihiro Suzuki	5
5	(Mongolia)	Baljinnyam Batbold	4
5	(Mongolia)	Oyunbaatar Mijiddorj	4
7	(Japan)	Yuta Mishima	3
7	(Mongolia)	Myagmar Bathishig	3
7	(Mongolia)	Mönkh-Orgil Orkhon	3
7	(Ivory Coast)	David Saviola	3
7	(Russia)	Pavel Zakharov	3
12	(Mongolia)	Narmandakh Artag	2
12	(Mongolia)	T Dalaitseren	2
12	(Mongolia)	Tortogtokh Enkh-Erdene	2
12	(Mongolia)	Batbilguun Gaanbatar	2
12	(Japan)	Aoto Saito	2
12	(Mongolia)	A Sodmunkh	2
12	(Mongolia)	Mönkh-Erdene Tsagaantsooj	2

Most hat-tricks in a single season

- 35 hat-tricks (2022–23)

Most hat-tricks by a player in a single season

- 6 hat-tricks.
  - (Mongolia) Tsedenbalyn Tümenjargal (2022–23)
