= Mongolia national football team =

Mongolia
- Nickname(s): Blue Wolves (Note: Mongolian: Хөх Чононууд, romanized: Khökh Chononuud, pronounced [xɵ́x t͡ɕʰɔnɜnʊ́t]); Genghis Khan (Note: Mongolian: Чингис Хаан, romanized: Chingis Khaan, pronounced [t͡ɕʰíŋkɪs χáːɴ])
- Association: Mongolian Football Federation (MFF) (Монголын Хөлбөмбөгийн Холбоо)
- Confederation: AFC (Asia)
- Sub-confederation: EAFF (East Asia)
- Head coach: Marco Ragini
- Captain: Tsend-Ayuush Khürelbaatar
- Most caps: Tsend-Ayuush Khürelbaatar (49)
- Top scorer: Nyam-Osor Naranbold (9)
- Home stadium: MFF Football Centre
- FIFA code: MNG
First colours	Second colours

FIFA ranking
- Current: 190 (7 October 2026)
- Highest: 160 (August 2011)
- Lowest: 205 (July 2015)

First international
- North Vietnam 3–1 Mongolia (Hanoi, North Vietnam; 3 October 1960)

Biggest win
- Mongolia 9–0 Northern Mariana Islands (Ulaanbaatar, Mongolia; 4 September 2018)

Biggest defeat
- Uzbekistan 15–0 Mongolia (Chiang Mai, Thailand; 5 December 1998)

AFC Solidarity Cup
- Appearances: 1 (first in 2016)
- Best result: Group stage (2016)

EAFF E-1 Football Championship
- Appearances: 7 (first in 2003)
- Best result: 7th (2019)

Asian Games
- Appearances: 1 (first in 1998)
- Best result: Group stage (1998)

The Mongolia national football team (Note: Mongolian: Монголын хөлбөмбөгийн үндэсний шигшээ баг, romanized: Mongoliin khölbömbögiin ündesnii shigshee bag, pronounced [mɔɴɢɜɬíɴ xɵɬpɵmpʉɣíɴ untɘsní ɕikɕé paq]) represents Mongolia in international football and is controlled by the Mongolian Football Federation.

Founded in 1959, the association was inactive between 1960 and 1998 when the team did not feature in any international fixtures. The Mongolian Football Federation is a member of the Asian Football Confederation and the East Asian Football Federation. The team has never participated in the FIFA World Cup, and the only major international tournaments the team has taken part in are the 1998 Asian Games and 2016 AFC Solidarity Cup, not progressing past the group stage in either competition.

== History ==
Mongolia's first international fixture was a 12–0 loss to Japan during a match in Manchukuo in 1942. Between 1960 and 1998, the Mongolia team played no international matches before being accepted as a FIFA member in 1998. Mongolia's first competitive matches were in the 1998 Asian Games qualifiers where they were heavily defeated by Kuwait 11–0, and by Uzbekistan 15–0.

They entered qualification for the 2002 FIFA World Cup, but lost their opening five matches before drawing 2–2 with Bangladesh, securing a single point. In the 2006 FIFA World Cup qualifiers, Mongolia was drawn against the Maldives and though they remained competitive after the first leg, only losing 1–0 at home, they were crushed in the second leg in Malé 12–0 and eliminated. In the first round of the 2010 FIFA World Cup qualifiers, Mongolia was beaten 9–2 on aggregate by North Korea, and four years later in the 2014 FIFA World Cup qualifiers, Mongolia lost to Myanmar 2–1. Mongolia then lost in the 2018 FIFA World Cup qualifiers to Timor-Leste; however, they were later awarded two 3–0 victories as Timor-Leste had fielded numerous ineligible players. This came after the second round matches had been played; therefore, Mongolia did not advance in the competition.

According to the voting outcome at the AFC Congress held in January 2011, the Mongolian Football Federation was suspended to conduct any activities at the EAFF until the EAFF Ordinary Congress of March 2014. They were welcomed back to the federation at the 7th Ordinary Congress and 41st and 42nd Executive Committee Meeting of the EAFF.

For Mongolia, their next tournament was the 2016 AFC Solidarity Cup, a tournament for the confederation's lowest ranked teams who have limited opportunities to arrange friendly matches, in November 2016. The tournament would replace the defunct AFC Challenge Cup. Being drawn in Group B alongside Sri Lanka, Macau, and Laos, Mongolia finished third in the group with a loss to Laos in the final match-day ending their chances of qualifying through to the semi-finals.

Mongolia then hosted their first international with the EAFF Annual Meeting advising that Mongolia would host the Round 1 of qualification for the East Asian Football Championship After comfortable wins in its first two matches, Mongolia needed only a single point against Guam on the final matchday to secure a place in the second round of the tournament for the first time ever. After a scoreless first half, Guam took the lead in the 89th minute. However, in the fourth minute of stoppage time a Norjmoo Tsedenbal strike rescued a point for Mongolia which was enough for the team to earn the top spot in the group and advance. Mongolia's 9–0 result over the Northern Mariana Islands set the current team record for largest margin of victory

Mongolia succeeded in qualifying past the first round for the first time in the 2022 FIFA World Cup qualifiers by beating Brunei 3–2 over two legs. In the second round, following a 14–0 defeat to Japan on 30 March 2021, they let head coach Rastislav Božik go and hired Shuichi Mase as their new head coach. In their next game on 7 June, Mongolia managed to shock Kyrgyzstan 1–0 for their first ever win against a Central Asian and a top-100 ranked opponent in a FIFA qualifier. This win meant that the national team competed in 2023 AFC Asian Cup qualifying in the third-round where they only would get the one win against Yemen. In March 2023, Mongolia recorded its highest-ever FIFA ranking of 183rd.

== Team image ==
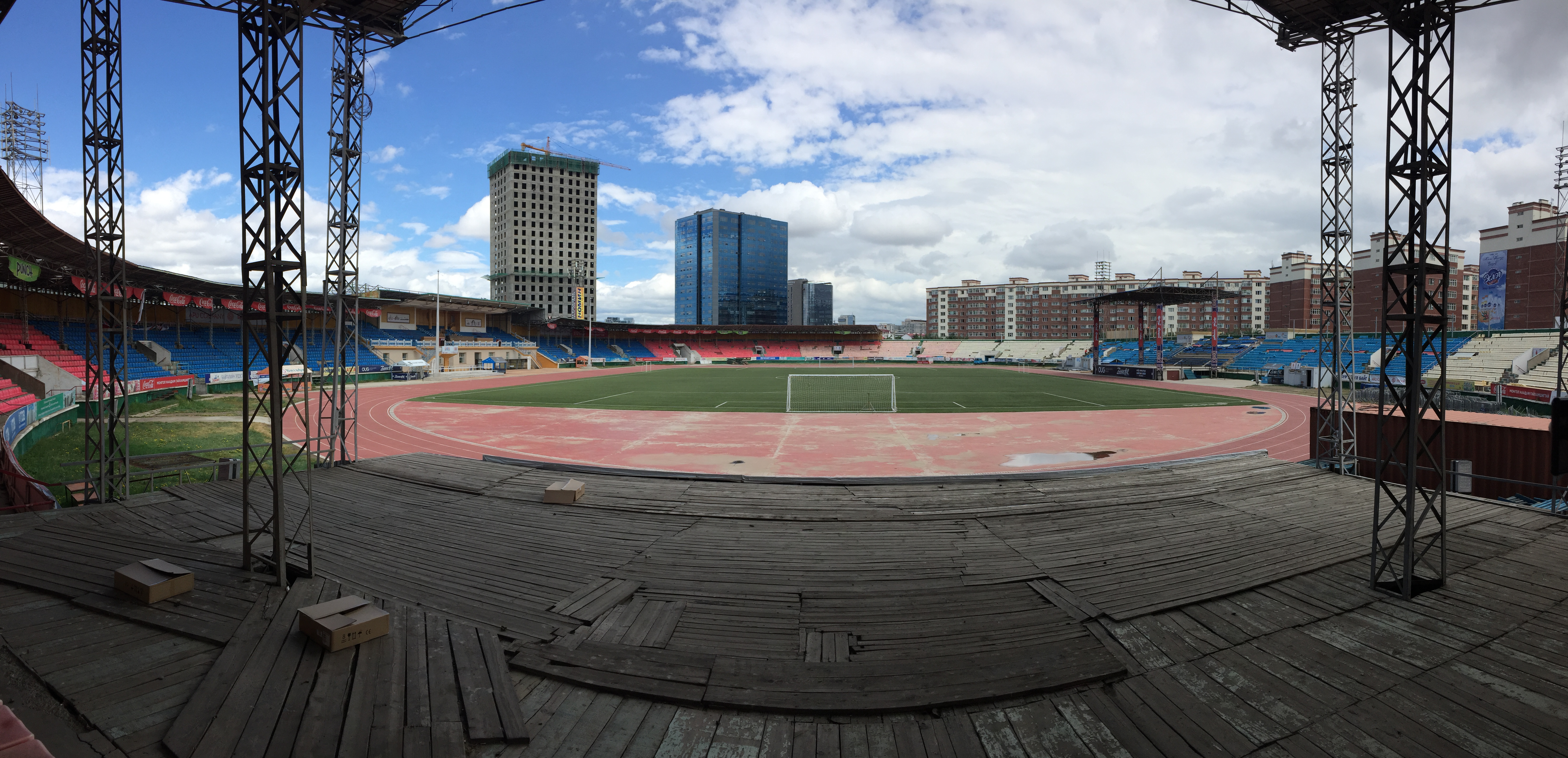
The National Sports Stadium was Mongolia's home stadium until the MFF Football Centre was constructed.

=== Nicknames ===
The Mongolian national team is often nicknamed the Blue Wolves. The blue wolf is a symbol of Turkic and Mongolian people, and originates from the Mongolian legend of the blue wolf. The team has also been known as the "Shegshee", which translates as "national team" in Mongolian.

=== Kits and crest ===
Currently, the Mongolian national football team uses an all-white uniform as their first colours, and a blue uniform as their second colours. In August 2021 it was announced that Mongolian sportswear company TG Sport had signed a two-year deal with the Mongolian Football Federation to provide kits for all Mongolian national teams.

Kelme is currently the official jerseys sponsor for the team from 2023

=== Home stadium ===
Mongolia plays their home matches at the MFF Football Centre, a 5,000 capacity stadium in Ulaanbaatar. The stadium boasts an artificial playing surface.

== Results and fixtures ==
Win Draw Loss Fixture

=== 2026 ===
31 May Friendly	Singapore	4–0	Mongolia	Kallang, Singapore
19:30 UTC+8	Baharudin 22' (pen.); Song 38'; Shawal 58'; I. Fandi 87'	Report		Stadium: Jalan Besar Stadium; Attendance: 4,324; Referee: Kim Woo-sung (South Korea)

5 June Friendly	Hong Kong	2–0	Mongolia	So Kon Po, Hong Kong
20:00 UTC+8	Juninho 5'; Ng Yu Hei 81'	Report		Stadium: Hong Kong Stadium; Attendance: 6,016; Referee: Hoàng Ngọc Hà (Vietnam)

== Coaching staff ==
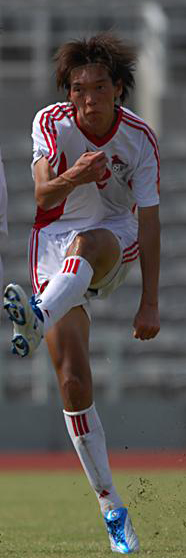
Bayasgalangiin Garidmagnai played for the national football team of Mongolia before he became the manager of the team in 2024

Position	Name
Team Manager	(Mongolia) Temuulen Terbish
Head Coach	(San Marino) Marco Ragini
Assistant coach	(Mongolia) Sükhnaagiin Otgonbayar (Mongolia) Zorigtyn Battulga (Mongolia) Tserenjavyn Enkhjargal
Goalkeeper coach	(Mongolia) Dorjmoogiin Ganbold
Team Doctor	(Mongolia) Samatyn Bakhtiyar
Physiotherapist	(Mongolia) Khürelbaataryn Tsakhia
Media Officer	(Mongolia) Mönkh-Erdeniin Khaltmaa

=== Coaching statistics ===
Name	Nat	Period	Matches	Wins	Draws	Losses	Win %
Pavel Sevastyanov	(Soviet Union)	1958–1960	3	0	0	3	0%
none		1961–1992; 1994–1997	National football team does not exist				
Lkhamsürengiin Dorjsüren	(Mongolia)	1993, 1998	2	0	0	2	0%
Luvsandorjiin Sandagdorj	(Mongolia)	February 1999 – January 2000	0	0	0	0	0%
Ishdorjiin Otgonbayar	(Mongolia)	January 2000 – January 2011	31	7	4	21	17%
Sandagdorjiin Erdenebat	(Mongolia)	January 2011 – July 2014	4	2	0	2	50%
Vojislav Bralušić	(Serbia)	July 2014 – January 2015	3	1	0	2	33.3%
Sanjmyataviin Purevsukh	(Mongolia)	January 2015 – 2016	5	1	1	3	20%
Zorigtyn Battulga	(Mongolia)	May 2016	3	1	1	1	33%
Toshiaki Imai	(Japan)	October 2016 – January 2017	3	1	0	2	33.3%
Michael Weiß	(Germany)	March 2017 – 24 January 2020	12	5	3	11	26.3%
Vojislav Bralušić (interim)	(Serbia)	27 January 2020 – 18 September 2020	0	0	0	0	0.0%
Rastislav Božik	(Slovakia)	18 September 2020 – 8 April 2021	0	0	0	2	0.0%
Shuichi Mase	(Japan)	8 April 2021 – 17 December 2021	1	1	0	0	100.0%
Otsuka Ichiro	(Japan)	17 December 2021 – 26 August 2024	16	2	2	12	12.50%
Bayasgalangiin Garidmagnai	(Mongolia)	28 August 2024–present	0	0	0	0	0%

== Players ==
=== Current squad ===
The following players were called up for the Football at the 2026 Asian Games matches against Singapore and Hong Kong on 31 May and 5 June 2026.

Caps and goals are correct as of 5 June 2026, after the match against Hong Kong.

No.	Pos.	Player	Date of birth (age)	Caps	Goals	Club
22	GK	Gan-Erdene Enkh-Erdene	12 August 2003 (age 23)	0	0	(Mongolian Football Federation) Khoromkhon
1	GK	Tsenguun Khandaa	25 November 2002 (age 23)	2	0	(Mongolian Football Federation) SP Falcons
21	GK	Ariunbold Batsaikhan	3 April 1990 (age 36)	21	0	(Mongolian Football Federation) Khangarid
12	DF	Mönkh-Orgil Orkhon	30 January 1999 (age 27)	28	1	(Chinese Taipei Football Association) Taichung Futuro
2	DF	Uuganbat Bat-Erdene	9 February 1997 (age 29)	12	0	(Mongolian Football Federation) Deren
30	DF	Filip Andersen	13 February 2003 (age 23)	9	0	(Football Association of Malaysia) Negeri Sembilan
11	DF	Tuguldur Batsukh	17 January 2004 (age 22)	0	0	(Mongolian Football Federation) Khoromkhon
3	DF	Taivankhuu Khürelbaatar	16 February 1997 (age 29)	0	0	(Mongolian Football Federation) Hunters
5	DF	Munkhkhuslen Munkhsaikhan	11 January 2002 (age 24)	1	0	(Mongolian Football Federation) Deren
23	DF	Enkh-Orgil Otgonbaatar	26 April 1998 (age 28)	2	0	(Mongolian Football Federation) SP Falcons
4	DF	Otgontsagaan Saikhanbayar	6 March 2001 (age 25)	0	0	(Mongolian Football Federation) SP Falcons
10	MF	Tsend-Ayuush Khürelbaatar	22 February 1990 (age 36)	49	1	(Mongolian Football Federation) Tuv Azarganuud
9	MF	Tögöldör Mönkh-Erdengiin	23 February 1991 (age 35)	25	7	(Mongolian Football Federation) SP Falcons
7	MF	Dölgöön Amaraa	20 February 2001 (age 25)	22	2	(Mongolian Football Federation) Deren
6	MF	Amgalanbat Batbaatar	21 January 2001 (age 25)	10	0	(Mongolian Football Federation) Ulaanbaatar
24	MF	Togoo Mönkhbaatar	20 November 1999 (age 26)	6	0	(Mongolian Football Federation) Khoromkhon
14	MF	Tsogtbayar Batbayar	8 July 2001 (age 25)	5	0	(Austrian Football Association) ASK Köflach
15	MF	Gan-Erdene Erdenebat	24 August 2005 (age 21)	3	0	(Mongolian Football Federation) Deren
26	FW	Temüülen Zayaat	10 December 2003 (age 22)	2	0	(Mongolian Football Federation) Khangarid
25	FW	Usukh-Ireedui Baatar	15 July 2002 (age 24)	2	0	(Mongolian Football Federation) Deren
28	FW	Sainbuyan Nergui	19 September 2002 (age 24)	2	0	(Mongolian Football Federation) Ulaanbaatar

=== Recent call-ups ===
The following players have been called up for the team within the last 12 months and are still available for selection.

Pos.	Player	Date of birth (age)	Caps	Goals	Club	Latest call-up
Notes: ^{INJ} = Withdrew due to injury.; ^{PRE} = Preliminary squad/standby.; ^{RET} = Retired from the national team.; ^{SUS} = Serving suspension.; ^{WD} = Player withdrew from the squad due to non-injury issue.

== Player records ==
As of 5 June 2026
Players in bold are still active with Mongolia.

=== Most appearances ===
Rank	Player	Caps	Goals	Career
1	**Tsend-Ayuush Khürelbaatar**	49	1	2007–present
2	Garidmagnai Bayasgalan	35	2	2003–2019
2	Donorovyn Lümbengarav	35	8	2000–2014
2	Norjmoogiin Tsedenbal	35	7	2009–2021
5	**Naranbold Nyam-Osor**	33	9	2014–present
6	**Törböt Daginaa**	28	2	2015–present
6	Tserenjavyn Enkhjargal	28	0	2000–2016
6	**Mönkh-Orgil Orkhon**	28	1	2017–present
9	**Baljinnyam Batbold**	26	4	2018–present
9	Davaajav Battör	26	0	2016–2021
9	**Ganboldyn Bilgüün**	26	0	2013–present
9	Ganbaataryn Tögsbayar	26	6	2003–2015

=== Top goalscorers ===
Rank	Name	Goals	Caps	Ratio	Career
1	**Naranbold Nyam-Osor**	9	33	0.27	2014–present
2	Donorovyn Lümbengarav	8	35	0.23	2003–2014
3	**Tögöldör Mönkh-Erdengiin**	7	26	0.27	2013–present
3	Norjmoogiin Tsedenbal	7	35	0.2	2009–2021
5	Ganbaataryn Tögsbayar	6	26	0.23	2003–2011
6	Oyuunbatyn Bayarjargal	4	10	0.4	2013–2018
6	Davaagiin Bayarzorig	4	19	0.21	2000–2007
6	**Gankhuyag Serodyanjiv**	4	22	0.18	2016–present
6	**Baljinnyam Batbold**	4	26	0.15	2018–present
10	Boldyn Buman-Uchral	3	11	0.27	2000–2005
10	**Narmandakh Artag**	3	19	0.16	2018–present

== Competitive record ==
=== FIFA World Cup ===
FIFA World Cup									Qualification					
Year	Result	Position	Pld	W	D*	L	F	A	Pld	W	D	L	F	A
(Uruguay) 1930	Team did not exist								Team did not exist					
(Italy) 1934	Team did not exist								Team did not exist					
(France) 1938	Team did not exist								Team did not exist					
(Brazil) 1950	Team did not exist								Team did not exist					
(Switzerland) 1954	Team did not exist								Team did not exist					
(Sweden) 1958	Team did not exist								Team did not exist					
(Chile) 1962	Not a member of FIFA								Not a member of FIFA					
(England) 1966	Not a member of FIFA								Not a member of FIFA					
(Mexico) 1970	Not a member of FIFA								Not a member of FIFA					
(West Germany) 1974	Not a member of FIFA								Not a member of FIFA					
(Argentina) 1978	Not a member of FIFA								Not a member of FIFA					
(Spain) 1982	Not a member of FIFA								Not a member of FIFA					
(Mexico) 1986	Not a member of FIFA								Not a member of FIFA					
(Italy) 1990	Not a member of FIFA								Not a member of FIFA					
(United States) 1994	Not a member of FIFA								Not a member of FIFA					
(France) 1998	Not a member of FIFA								Not a member of FIFA					
(South Korea) (Japan) 2002	Did not qualify								6	0	1	5	2	22
(Germany) 2006	Did not qualify								2	0	0	2	0	13
(South Africa) 2010	Did not qualify								2	0	0	2	2	9
(Brazil) 2014	Did not qualify								2	1	0	1	1	2
(Russia) 2018	Did not qualify								2	0	0	2	1	5
(Qatar) 2022	Did not qualify								10	3	0	7	6	29
(Canada) (Mexico) (United States) 2026	Did not qualify								2	0	0	2	0	2
(Morocco) (Portugal) (Spain) (Argentina) (Paraguay) (Uruguay) 2030	To be determined								To be determined					
(Saudi Arabia) 2034	To be determined								To be determined					
Total		0/7	0	0	0	0	0	0	26	4	1	21	12	82

=== AFC Asian Cup ===
AFC Asian Cup record									Qualification record					
Year	Result	Position	Pld	W	D*	L	GF	GA	Pld	W	D*	L	GF	GA
(Hong Kong) 1956 to (United Arab Emirates) 1996	Not an AFC member								Not an AFC member					
(Lebanon) 2000	Did not qualify								3	0	0	3	1	10
(China) 2004	Did not qualify								2	1	1	0	5	0
(Indonesia) (Malaysia) (Thailand) (Vietnam) 2007	Did not enter								Did not enter					
(Qatar) 2011	Did not qualify								AFC Challenge Cup					
(Australia) 2015	Did not qualify								AFC Challenge Cup					
(United Arab Emirates) 2019	Did not qualify								2	0	0	2	1	5
(Qatar) 2023	Did not qualify								13	4	0	9	8	31
(Saudi Arabia) 2027	Did not qualify								4	1	0	3	3	6
Total	0 Titles	0/17	0	0	0	0	0	0	24	6	1	17	18	52

=== AFC Solidarity Cup ===
AFC Solidarity Cup record
Year	Round	Pld	W	D*	L	GF	GA
(Malaysia) 2016	Group stage	3	1	0	2	3	5
2020	Cancelled						
Total	Best: Group stage	3	1	0	2	3	5

=== AFC Challenge Cup ===
AFC Challenge Cup record									Qualification record					
Year	Result	Position	Pld	W	D*	L	GF	GA	Pld	W	D*	L	GF	GA
(Bangladesh) 2006	Did not participate								Did not participate					
(India) 2008	Did not participate								Did not participate					
(Sri Lanka) 2010	Did not qualify								2	1	0	1	3	3
(Nepal) 2012	Did not qualify								2	1	0	1	2	3
(Maldives) 2014	Did not qualify								3	0	1	2	1	5
Total	0 Titles	0/5	0	0	0	0	0	0	7	2	1	4	6	11

=== Asian Games ===
Asian Games record
Year	Result	M	W	D	L	GF	GA
(India) (Japan) 1951-1994	Did not participate						
(Thailand) 1998	Group stage	2	0	0	2	0	26
(South Korea) 2002–present	See Mongolia national under-23 football team						
Total	1/13	2	0	0	2	0	26

=== EAFF E-1 Football Championship ===
EAFF E-1 Football Championship record									Qualification record					
Year	Result	Position	Pld	W	D*	L	GF	GA	Pld	W	D*	L	GF	GA
(Japan) 2003	Did not qualify								4	1	0	3	2	16
(South Korea) 2005	Did not qualify								4	1	1	2	4	13
(China) 2008	Did not qualify								3	1	1	1	5	9
(Japan) 2010	Did not qualify								3	2	0	1	6	3
(South Korea) 2013	Suspended by EAFF								Suspended by EAFF					
(China) 2015	Did not qualify								3	1	0	2	6	5
(Japan) 2017	Did not qualify								3	1	1	1	10	4
(South Korea) 2019	Did not qualify								6	2	1	3	17	13
(Japan) 2022	Did not participate								Not held					
(South Korea) 2025	Did not qualify								2	0	0	2	0	7
(China) 2028	To be determined													
(Japan) 2030	To be determined													
Total	0 Titles	0/8	0	0	0	0	0	0	28	9	4	15	50	70
