= Bat-Ölzii =

District in Övörkhangai Province, Mongolia

Bat-Ölzii District Бат-Өлзий сум ᠪᠠᠲᠤᠥᠯᠵᠡᠢᠰᠤᠮᠤ
- District
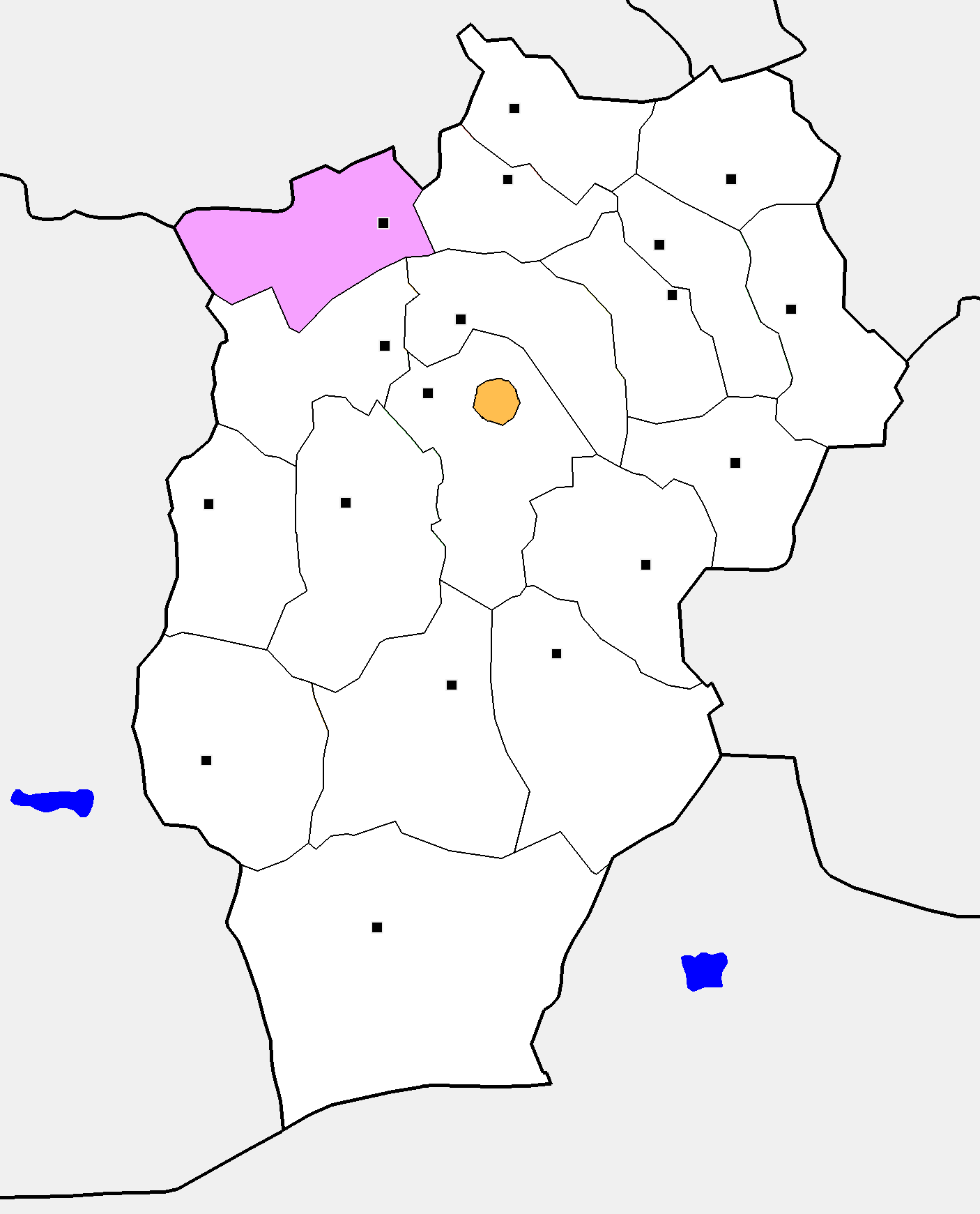
- Bat-Ölzii District in Övörkhangai Province

- Location within Mongolia
- Country: Mongolia
- Province: Övörkhangai Province
- Time zone: UTC+8 (UTC + 8)

Bat-Ölzii (Mongolian: Бат-Өлзий "Firm / Strong Auspiciousness") is a sum (district) in the northwest of Övörkhangai Province, Mongolia. Formerly in Sain Noyon Khan Province, it was established in 1924. In 2008, its population was 6,189.

== Administrative divisions ==
The district is divided into six bags, which are:

- Buregtii
- Khuiten bulag
- Ulaan-Am
- Uliastai
- Uvt
- Zuruuleg

== Tourist attractions ==
- Ulaan Tsutgalan Waterfall
