= 1955 Mongolian National Championship =

Football league season in Mongolia

Mongolian National Championship
- Season: 1955
- Champions: Soyol

The 1955 Mongolian National Championship was the first edition of the Mongolian National Championship for football. Prior to this, football tournaments had been held in Mongolia since 1946, when a football tournament was included in the first Spartakiad, the silver jubilee festival of the people's revolution and this tournament, it would seem, was considered to be the premier football competition in the country until the establishment of the national championship. The competition, which appears to have been played in a double-round-robin format between five teams, was contested over a period of seven to eight months. The competition was won by Soyol (literally: Culture), who had previously been successful a number of times in preceding Spartakiad tournaments, with the club's second team finishing as runners up.
