= 2019 Mongolian Premier League =

Football league season in Mongolia

Mongolian Premier League
- Season: 2019
- Dates: 13 April – 27 October 2019
- Champions: Ulaanbaatar City
- Relegated: Khaan Khuns Titem; Khoromkhon FC
- AFC Cup: Ulaanbaatar City
- Matches: 35
- Goals: 151 (4.31 per match)
- Top goalscorer: (Ivory Coast) David Saviola (34 goals)
- Biggest home win: Falcons 4–0 Anduud City (13 April 2019)
- Biggest away win: Khoromkhon 0–6 Falcons (15 June 2019)
- Highest scoring: Titem 5–5 Khangarid (3 May 2019)
- Longest winning run: Ulaanbaatar City (6 matches)
- Longest unbeaten run: Ulaanbaatar City (7 matches)
- Longest winless run: Titem; Khoromkhon (7 matches)
- Longest losing run: Khoromkhon (7 matches)
- All statistics correct as of 13 April 2019.

The 2019 Mongolian Premier League was the 51st season of football in Mongolia. The season began on 13 April and is scheduled to end in August 2019. This is the second year of a 3-year sponsorship deal with Mazala.

Erchim are the defending champion. Khoromkhon and Khaan Khuns Titem joined as the promoted teams from the 2018 Mongolian 1st League, replacing Arvis and Gepro which were relegated from the 2018 Mongolian Premier League.

== Teams ==
=== Stadiums and locations ===
Location of teams in 2019 Mongolian Premier League

Club	City	Stadium	Capacity
Anduud City	Ulaanbaatar	MFF Football Centre	5,000
Athletic 220	Ulaanbaatar	MFF Football Centre	5,000
Deren	Deren	National Sports Stadium	12,500
Erchim	Ulaanbaatar	Erchim Stadium	2,000
Falcons	Ulaanbaatar	MFF Football Centre	5,000
Khaan Khuns Titem	Ulaanbaatar	MFF Football Centre	5,000
Khangarid	Erdenet	Erdenet Stadium	7,000
Khoromkhon	Ulaanbaatar	MFF Football Centre	5,000
FC Ulaanbaatar	Ulaanbaatar	MFF Football Centre	5,000
Ulaanbaatar City	Ulaanbaatar	G-Mobile Arena	3,000

=== Personnel and kits ===
Team	Manager	Captain	Kit manufacturer	Shirt sponsor (chest)
Anduud City	(Serbia) Vojislav Bralušić		Zeus Sport	
Athletic 220	(Japan) Shori Murata	(Mongolia) Naranbold Nyam-Osor	TG Sport	Capitron
Deren	(Mongolia) Tsebendal Tumenjargal		Joma	
Erchim	(Mongolia) Battulga Zorigt	(Mongolia) Enkhjargal Tserenjav	Adidas	Herbalife
Falcons	(Japan) Tatsuya Nishio	(Mongolia) Mönkhbold Baldorj		NCD Corporation
Titem	(Russia) Alim Zumakulov		TG Sport	Khaan Khuns
Khangarid			TG Sport	Erdenet Mining Corporation
Khoromkhon		(Mongolia) Amarsanaa Ganbold		Khairkhan Uul Crew
Ulaanbaatar	(Japan) Jun Fukudo	(Mongolia) Bayarjargal Oyuunbat	TG Sport	Niislel
Ulaanbaatar City	(Mongolia) Lümbengarav Donorov	(Mongolia) Tsedenbal Norjmoo		G-Mobile

== League table ==
Pos	Team	Pld	W	D	L	GF	GA	GD	Pts	Qualification or relegation (Note: Teams are split into two groups (top five and bottom five) after each have played 18 matches.)
1	Ulaanbaatar City (C)	22	15	3	4	60	24	+36	48 (Note: Head-to-head results: Ulaanbaatar City 3–0 Erchim, Erchim 2–1 Ulaanbaatar City, Ulaanbaatar City 2–1 Erchim.)	Qualification for AFC Cup preliminary round 2
2	Erchim	22	15	3	4	65	28	+37	48	
3	Khangarid	22	13	1	8	62	45	+17	40	
4	Athletic 220	22	10	6	6	52	38	+14	36	
5	Deren	22	10	5	7	41	28	+13	35	
6	SP Falcons	22	12	2	8	65	31	+34	38	
7	FC Ulaanbaatar	22	8	5	9	47	37	+10	29	
8	Anduud City	22	9	1	12	38	63	−25	28	
9	Khaan Khuns Titem (R)	22	2	2	18	23	67	−44	8	Relegation to Mongolian 1st League
10	Khoromkhon (R)	22	2	0	20	18	110	−92	6	Relegation to Mongolian 1st League

Source: Mazala National League
Rules for classification: 1) Points; 2) Head-to-head points; 3) Head-to-head goal difference; 4) Head-to-head goals scored; 5) Goal difference; 6) Goals scored.
(C) Champions; (R) Relegated

== Top goalscorers ==
Rank	Player	Team	Goals
1	(Ivory Coast) David Saviola	Falcons	34
2	(Russia) Pavel Zakharov	Khangarid	27
3	(Japan) Motohiro Kanashiro	Erchim	22
3	(Mongolia) Nyam-Osor Naranbold	Athletic 220	22
5	(Russia) Andrej Rychenko	Khangarid	19
6	(Brazil) Gabriel do Carmo	Ulaanbaatar City	17
7	(Mongolia) Miyagmar Batkishig	Ulaanbaatar City	15
7	(Mongolia) Oyunbaatar Mijiddorj	Ulaanbaatar	15
9	(Japan) Tatsuya Nishio	Falcon	11
10	(Mongolia) Batkhiag Mönkh-Erdene	Athletic 220	10

== See also ==
- 2019 MFF Cup
