= 2017 Mongolian Premier League =

Football league season in Mongolia

Mongolian Premier League
- Season: 2017
- Champions: Erchim
- Matches: 90
- Goals: 264 (2.93 per match)
- Top goalscorer: Naranbold Nyam-Osor (15 goals)

The 2017 Mongolian Premier League (also known as the Khurkhree National Premier League) is the 49th edition of the tournament. Erchim came into the season as defending champions of the 2016 season.

Athletic 220 and Goyoo entered as the two promoted teams from the 1st League. The season started on April 29.

== Clubs ==
=== Clubs and locations ===
Location of teams in 2017 Mongolian Premier League

Club	City	Stadium	Capacity
Athletic 220	Ulaanbaatar	MFF Football Centre	3,500
Deren	Deren	National Sports Stadium	12,500
Erchim	Ulaanbaatar	Erchim Stadium	2,000
Goyo	Ulaanbaatar	MFF Football Centre	3,500
Khangarid	Erdenet	Erdenet Stadium	7,000
Khoromkhon	Ulaanbaatar	MFF Football Centre	3,500
Selenge Press	Ulaanbaatar	MFF Football Centre	3,500
Ulaanbaatar	Ulaanbaatar	MFF Football Centre	3,500
Ulaanbaatar City	Ulaanbaatar	MFF Football Centre	3,500
Ulaanbaataryn Unaganuud	Ulaanbaatar	MFF Football Centre	3,500

=== Personnel and kits ===
Team	Manager	Captain	Kit manufacturer	Shirt sponsor
Athletic 220	(Mongolia) Mönkhbat Pürevdorj	(Mongolia) Mönkhsaikhan Gerelbayar	Joma	Capitron Bank
Deren	(Serbia) Vojislav Bralušić	(Mongolia) Pürevsuren Enkhbayar	Sport-Saller	
Erchim	(Mongolia) Battulga Zorigt	(Mongolia) Enkhjargal Tserenjav	Adidas	Herbalife
Goyoo	(Mongolia) Davaa-Ochir Gongorjav	(Mongolia) Ganbayar Tseveensüren	Puma	
Khangarid	(Mongolia) Sergelen M.			
Khoromkhon	(Mongolia) Sanjmyataviin Purevsukh		Adidas	
Selenge Press	(Mongolia) Chin-Orgil B.		Nike	
Ulaanbaatar	(Japan) Jun Fukuda	(Mongolia) Mönkhnasan A.	Adidas	APU
Ulaanbaatar City	(Spain) Manuel Retamero Fraile	(Mongolia) Lkhagvasüren A.		G-Mobile
Ulaanbaataryn Unaganuud	(Mongolia) Erdene-Ochir S.	(Mongolia) Altantulga Pagmasüren	Adidas	Petrovis

== Results ==
=== League table ===
Pos	Team	Pld	W	D	L	GF	GA	GD	Pts	Qualification or relegation
1	Erchim (C)	18	13	3	2	47	15	+32	42	Qualification to AFC Cup East Asia Zone
2	Ulaanbaatar City	18	12	2	4	38	15	+23	38	
3	Athletic 220	18	10	4	4	32	21	+11	34	
4	Deren	18	9	2	7	18	15	+3	29	
5	Khangarid	18	7	6	5	29	27	+2	27	
6	Selenge Press	18	6	3	9	25	37	−12	21	
7	Goyoo	18	5	5	8	18	25	−7	20	
8	Ulaanbaatar	18	5	2	11	26	31	−5	17	Qualification to the Relegation play-offs
9	Khoromkhon (R)	18	4	3	11	20	44	−24	15	Relegation to 1st League
10	Ulaanbaataryn Unaganuud (R)	18	2	4	12	11	34	−23	10	Relegation to 1st League

Rules for classification: 1) Points; 2) Goal difference; 3) Goals scored; 4) Away goals scored; 5) Head to Head;
(C) Champions; (R) Relegated

=== Result table ===
Home \ Away	ATH	DER	ERC	GOY	KHA	KHO	SEL	UB	UBC	UBU
Athletic 220 FC		1–0	2–2	0–0	1–0	2–1	4–2	0–3	2–0	5–1
Deren	2–0		0–1	3–1	1–1	2–0	0–2	1–0	0–3	2–0
Erchim	3–2	0–1		2–1	1–0	9–0	4–0	2–1	1–0	3–1
Goyoo	1–2	1–0	1–3		0–1	2–1	1–0	4–3	1–1	1–1
Khangarid	0–0	0–0	3–2	1–1		2–1	3–3	1–4	1–6	2–0
Khoromkhon	0–0	1–2	1–9	3–2	3–2		2–0	1–1	0–3	1–1
Selenge Press	3–2	1–3	0–0	0–1	1–6	2–1		2–2	1–4	1–0
Ulaanbaatar	1–3	1–0	0–1	2–0	2–4	1–2	1–3		0–3	1–0
Ulaanbaatar City	1–2	2–0	1–1	2–0	1–2	2–1	2–1	3–1		2–0
Ulaanbaataryn Unaganuud	1–4	0–1	1–3	0–0	0–0	2–2	1–3	1–0	1–4	

Legend: Blue = home team win; Yellow = draw; Red = away team win.

== Top goalscorers ==
Rank	Player	Club	Goals
1	(Mongolia) Naranbold Nyam-Osor	Athletic 220	15
2	(Japan) Ishino Shuta	Athletic 220	12
3	(Mongolia) Batkhuyag Munkh-Erdene	Selenge Press	11
4	(Mongolia) Tumenjargal Tsedenbal	Ulaanbaatar City	10
4	(Japan) Mothoki Keshshi	Ulaanbaatar	10
4	(Mongolia) Mönkh-Erdene Tuguldur	Erchim	10
7	(Mongolia) Oyuunbatyn Bayarjargal	Ulaanbaatar	8
7	(Mongolia) Gankhuyag Ser-Od-Yanjiv	Khangarid	8
9	(Mongolia) Enkhbileg Purevdorj	Goyoo	7
10	(Japan) Taku Yeshida	Selenge Press	6
10	Nicolas Vandeli	Erchim	6
10	(Mongolia) G. Tuntulak	Erchim	6
