= Nyam-Osor Naranbold =

Mongolian footballer (born 1992)

Naranbold Nyam-Osor
Personal information
- Full name: Nyam-Osoryn Naranbold; Ням-Осорын Наранболд
- Date of birth: 22 February 1992 (age 34)
- Place of birth: Bayanjargalan, Mongolia
- Height: 1.84 m (6 ft 1/2 in)
- Position: Forward

Team information
- Current team: Khoromkhon

Senior career*
Years	Team	Apps	(Gls)
2008–2017	Khoromkhon	33	(36)
2017–2022	Athletic 220	99	(97)
2022	Tuv Buganuud	11	(12)
2022–2023	Khovd	21	(14)
2023–	Khoromkhon	53	(47)

International career^{‡}
2014–	Mongolia	33	(9)
- * Club domestic league appearances and goals ‡ National team caps and goals as of 10 September 2025

Nyam-Osoryn Naranbold (Mongolian: Ням-Осорын Наранболд; born 22 February 1992) is a Mongolian footballer who plays as a forward for the club Khoromkhon of the Mongolian Premier League. With nine international goals, he is the all-time top scorer for Mongolia.

== Club career ==
=== Khoromkhon ===
Naranbold began playing for Khoromkhon of the Mongolian Premier League in 2008. He made appearances in the club's two matches during the qualifying rounds of the 2016 AFC Cup, a 0–2 defeat to K-Electric of Pakistan and a 0–0 draw with Druk United of Bhutan. Khoromkhon failed to progress to the next round. With Khoromkhon, he won the league championship in 2014 and was runner-up in 2008 and 2012. For the 2015 season he was the league's top goal scorer with 23 goals.

=== Athletic 220 ===
Naranbold won the award again two seasons later with 17 goals after transferring to Athletic 220 prior to the 2017 Mongolian Premier League season. He scored both of the team’s goals in the final of the 2018 Mongolia Cup as Athletic 220 defeated Ulaanbaatar City 2–0 to win the title. He went on to help the club win back-to-back league championships in 2020 and 2021. Following the 2020 season he received the award for Best Goal and Best Male Player. Naranbold went on to score the club's only goal in the 2021 AFC Cup, coming in a 1–5 loss to Hong Kong's Lee Man.

=== Tuv Buganuud ===
In January 2022, Naranbold left Athletic 220 and became a free agent. On 3 March of that year he joined newly-promoted Tuv Buganuud. He finished the 2021–22 season with fourteen goals, tying him with Deren's Pavel Zakharov for second in the league.

=== Khovd ===
After a single season, Naranbold left the club and signed for Khovd.

== International career ==
Naranbold made his Mongolia national team debut on 23 July 2014 in a 0–2 lost to Guam in the first round of the 2015 EAFF East Asian Cup. He scored his first senior international goal on 4 July 2016 in an 8–0 victory over the Northern Mariana Islands. The win set Mongolia's record for their largest margin of victory. He went on to score both of Mongolia's goals in a 2–0 victory over Sri Lanka during the 2016 AFC Solidarity Cup, the inaugural edition of the tournament.

On 11 June 2024 in a match against Cambodia, Naranbold scored his ninth senior international goal to become Mongolia's all-time top scorer, surpassing Donorovyn Lümbengarav's previous record of eight. The goals helped Mongolia snap an eight-match goalless streak and nine-match winless streak.

=== International goals ===
Scores and results list Mongolia's goal tally first.

No.	Date	Venue	Opponent	Score	Result	Competition
1.	4 July 2016	GFA National Training Center, Dededo, Guam	Northern Mariana Islands	3–0	8–0	2017 EAFF E-1 Football Championship qualification
2.	6 November 2016	Sarawak State Stadium, Kuching, Malaysia	Sri Lanka	1–0	2–0	2016 AFC Solidarity Cup
3.	6 November 2016	Sarawak State Stadium, Kuching, Malaysia	Sri Lanka	2–0	2–0	2016 AFC Solidarity Cup
4.	5 October 2017	Taipei Municipal Stadium, Taipei, Taiwan	Chinese Taipei	2–3	2–4	Friendly
5.	2 September 2018	MFF Football Centre, Ulaanbaatar, Mongolia	Macau	4–1	4–1	2019 EAFF E-1 Football Championship qualification
6.	16 October 2018	New Laos National Stadium, Vientiane, Laos	Laos	4–1	4–1	Friendly
7.	11 November 2018	Taipei Municipal Stadium, Taipei, Taiwan	North Korea	1–4	1–4	2019 EAFF E-1 Football Championship qualification
8.	6 June 2019	MFF Football Centre, Ulaanbaatar, Mongolia	Brunei	2–0	2–0	2022 FIFA World Cup qualification
9.	11 June 2024	MFF Football Centre, Ulaanbaatar, Mongolia	Cambodia	1–1	2–1	Friendly
Last updated 11 June 2024

== Career statistics ==
=== Club ===
Club	Season	League			Cup		Continental		Others		Total	
Club	Season	Division	Apps	Goals	Apps	Goals	Apps	Goals	Apps	Goals	Apps	Goals
Khoromkhon	2015	Mongolian Premier League	16	23			2	0			18	23
Khoromkhon	2016	Mongolian Premier League	17	13							17	13
Khoromkhon	2023–24	Mongolian Premier League	24	25	0	0	0	0	0	0	24	25
Khoromkhon	2024–25	Mongolian Premier League	21	13							21	13
Khoromkhon	2025-26	Mongolian Premier League	8	9							8	9
Khoromkhon	Total		86	83			2	0			88	83
Athletic	2017	Mongolian Premier League	18	15	2	2					20	17
Athletic	2018	Mongolian Premier League	17	14	4	12			1	1	22	27
Athletic	2019	Mongolian Premier League	21	22							21	22
Athletic	2020	Mongolian Premier League	22	29							22	29
Athletic	2021	Mongolian Premier League	17	15			3	1			20	16
Athletic	2021–22	Mongolian Premier League	4	2							4	2
Athletic	Total		99	97	6	14	3	1	1	1	109	113
Tuv Azarganuud	2021–22	Mongolian Premier League	11	12							11	12
Khovd	2022–23	Mongolian Premier League	21	14							21	14
Total career			217	206	6	14	5	1	1	1	229	222

=== International career statistics ===
As of match played 10 September 2024

Mongolia
Year	Apps	Goals
2014	1	0
2015	2	0
2016	5	3
2017	1	1
2018	7	3
2019	7	1
2021	2	0
2022	4	0
2023	0	0
2024	4	1
Total	33	9

== Honours ==
Khoromkhon

- MFF Cup: 2012
- Mongolian Premier League: 2014

Athletic 220

- MFF Cup: 2018
- Mongolian Premier League: 2020, 2021

=== Individual ===
- Mongolian Premier League Top Goalscorer: 2023–24
