= 2021–22 Mongolian National Premier League =

Mongolian Premier League season

Mongolian National Premier League
- Season: 2022
- Champions: Erchim (13th title)
- Relegated: Lions
- AFC Cup: Erchim
- Matches: 90
- Goals: 412 (4.58 per match)
- Top goalscorer: (Japan) Yuta Mishima (26 goals)

The 2021–22 Mongolian National Premier League is the 54th season of the Mongolian National Premier League.

== Teams ==
Club	City	Stadium	Capacity
Athletic 220 FC	Ulaanbaatar	MFF Football Centre	5,000
BCH Lions	Ulaanbaatar	MFF Football Centre	5,000
Deren	Ulaanbaatar	National Sports Stadium	12,000
SP Falcons	Ulaanbaatar	MFF Football Centre	5,000
Khaan Khuns Erchim	Ulaanbaatar	MFF Football Centre	5,000
Khangarid FC	Erdenet	Erdenet Stadium	3,000
Khoromkhon FC	Ulaanbaatar	MFF Football Centre	5,000
Khovd FC	Ulaanbaatar	MFF Football Centre	5,000
FC Ulaanbaatar	Ulaanbaatar	MFF Football Centre	5,000
Ulaanbaatar City	Ulaanbaatar	G-Mobile Arena	3,000

== League table ==
Pos	Team	Pld	W	D	L	GF	GA	GD	Pts	Qualification
1	Erchim (C)	18	14	2	2	63	15	+48	44	Qualifications for AFC Cup
2	Ulaanbaatar	18	13	2	3	56	18	+38	41	
3	Ulaanbaatar City	18	10	3	5	51	28	+23	33	
4	Deren	18	10	2	6	42	26	+16	32	
5	Tuv Buganuud	18	9	3	6	38	33	+5	30	
6	Falcons	18	9	2	7	39	33	+6	29	
7	Athletic 220	18	3	5	10	18	31	−13	14	
8	Khangarid	18	3	3	12	19	44	−25	12	
9	Khovd	18	3	2	13	25	69	−44	11	
10	Lions	18	2	4	12	19	73	−54	10	

Rules for classification: 1)Points; 2)Head-to-head points; 3)Head-to-head goal difference; 4)Head-to-head goal scored; 5)Goal difference; 6)Goal scored.
(C) Champions

== Top goalscorers ==
Rank	Player	Club	Goals
1	(Japan) Yuta Mishima	Erchim	25
2	(Mongolia) Nyam-Osor Naranbold	Tuv Buganuud	14
2	(Russia) Pavel Zakharov	Deren	14
4	(Japan) Takaya Sugasawa	Khovd	13
5	(Japan) Akihiro Suzuki	Ulaanbaatar	11
6	(Mongolia) Namsrai Baatartsogt	Ulaanbaatar City	9
6	(Japan) Jumpei Nishiwaki	Khangarid	9
8	(Mongolia) Tsedenbalyn Tümenjargal	Erchim	8
8	(Mongolia) B Usukh-Ireedui	Deren	8
10	(Mongolia) Batbilguun Ganbaatar	Erchim	7
10	(Japan) Yuzuki Miyajima	BCH Lions	7
10	(Mongolia) Mönkh-Erdene Tsagaantsooj	Ulaanbaatar	7

== Multiple hat-tricks ==
Player	For	Against	Score	Date
(Mongolia) Batbilguun Gaanbatar^{4}	Erchim	Ulaanbaatar City	0–6	4 November 2021
(Mongolia) Mönkh-Erdene Tsagaantsooj^{4}	Ulaanbaatar	Lions	5–0	6 November 2021
(Mongolia) O. Munkhsaikhan	Khangarid	Erchim	4–3	7 November 2021
(Japan) Yuta Mishima	Erchim	Khovd	9–0	9 April 2022
(Japan) Riku Ichimura	Erchim	Khovd	9–0	9 April 2022
(Mongolia) Namsrai Baatartsogt	Ulaanbaatar City	Lions	8–0	10 April 2023
(Mongolia) Munkh-Erdene Erdenesuren	Ulaanbaatar City	Lions	8–0	10 April 2022
(Russia) Pavel Zakharov	Deren	Lions	5–0	11 May 2022
(Japan) Takaya Sugasawa	Khovd	Athletic 220	0–4	11 May 2022
(Japan) Yuta Mishima^{5}	Erchim	Lions	11–1	21 May 2022
(Japan) Akihiro Suzuki^{5}	Ulaanbaatar	Khovd	9–2	21 May 2022
(Mongolia) Oyunbaatar Mijiddorj^{4}	Ulaanbaatar City	Lions	2–8	17 June 2022
(Mongolia) Tsedenbalyn Tümenjargal^{5}	Tuv Azarganuud	Lions	1–9	23 June 2022
(Mongolia) Nyam-Osor Naranbold	Tuv Azarganuud	Lions	1–9	23 June 2022
