= 2020 Mongolian National Premier League =

Football league season in Mongolia

Mongolian National Premier League
- Season: 2020
- Dates: 1 July – 27 September
- Champions: Athletic 220 FC
- Relegated: Gepro
- Matches: 90
- Goals: 393 (4.37 per match)
- Top goalscorer: Nyam-Osor Naranbold (29 goals)
- Biggest home win: Khangarid 9–0 Gepro (8 July 2020); Athletic 220 10–1 UB Mazaalaynuud (7 August 2020)
- Biggest away win: Sumida Gepro 0–13 Khaan Khuns – Erchim (5 July 2020)
- Highest scoring: Anduud City 2–14 Khaan Khuns – Erchim (27 September 2020)
- Longest winning run: Athletic 220 (8 matches)
- Longest unbeaten run: Athletic 220 (12 matches)
- Longest winless run: Sumida Gepro (18 matches)
- Longest losing run: Sumida Gepro (18 matches)
- All statistics correct as of 06 September 2021.

The 2020 Mongolian National Premier League was the 52nd season of the Mongolian National Premier League. The season began on 1 July and ended in September 2020. This is the final year of a three-year sponsorship deal with Mazala.

== Teams ==
Location of teams in 2020 Mongolian Premier League

Club	City	Stadium	Capacity
Anduud City	Ulaanbaatar	MFF Football Centre	5,000
Athletic 220	Ulaanbaatar	MFF Football Centre	5,000
Deren	Deren	National Sports Stadium	12,500
SP Falcons	Ulaanbaatar	MFF Football Centre	5,000
Khaan Khuns – Erchim	Ulaanbaatar	MFF Football Centre	5,000
Khangarid	Erdenet	Erdenet Stadium	3,000
Sumida-Gepro	Ulaanbaatar	MFF Football Centre	5,000
Ulaanbaataryn Mazaalaynuud	Ulaanbaatar	MFF Football Centre	5,000
FC Ulaanbaatar	Ulaanbaatar	MFF Football Centre	5,000
Ulaanbaatar City	Ulaanbaatar	G-Mobile Arena	3,000

== League table ==
Pos	Team	Pld	W	D	L	GF	GA	GD	Pts	Qualification
1	Athletic 220 (C)	18	12	4	2	56	14	+42	40	Qualification for AFC Cup group stage
2	Ulaanbaatar	18	12	2	4	56	22	+34	38	
3	Khangarid	18	11	3	4	52	24	+28	36	
4	Khaan Khuns – Erchim	18	11	2	5	64	20	+44	35	
5	Falcons	18	11	2	5	49	18	+31	35	
6	Deren	18	10	3	5	40	21	+19	33	
7	Ulaanbaatar City	18	7	3	8	38	28	+10	24	
8	Anduud City	18	3	1	14	21	72	−51	10	
9	UB Mazaalaynuud (R)	18	3	0	15	10	77	−67	9	Relegation to Mongolian 1st League
10	Sumida Gepro (R)	18	0	0	18	7	97	−90	0	Relegation to Mongolian 1st League

Source: Soccerway
Rules for classification: 1) Points; 2) Head-to-head points; 3) Head-to-head goal difference; 4) Head-to-head goals scored; 5) Goal difference; 6) Goals scored.
(C) Champions; (R) Relegated

== Positions by round ==
This table lists the positions of teams after each week of matches. In order to preserve the chronological evolution, any postponed matches are not included to the round at which they were originally scheduled, but added to the full round they were played immediately afterwards. For example, if a match is scheduled for matchday 13, but then postponed and played between days 16 and 17, it will be added to the standings for day 16.

Team ╲ Round	1	2	3	4	5	6	7	8	9	10	11	12	13	14	15	16	17	18
Athletic 220	5	4	3	5	6	7	5	5	3	3	3	3	3	2	2	1	1	1
Ulaanbaatar	6	6	4	2	2	2	2	2	4	6	6	5	5	5	5	4	3	2
Khangarid	3	1	1	1	1	1	1	1	1	1	1	1	1	1	1	2	2	3
Khaan Khuns-Erchim	1	3	2	4	5	6	6	4	2	2	2	2	2	3	4	3	5	4
Falcons	4	2	5	3	3	3	3	3	5	4	4	4	4	4	3	5	4	5
Deren	7	7	7	7	7	5	4	7	7	7	7	6	6	6	6	6	6	6
Ulaanbaatar City	2	5	6	6	4	4	7	6	6	5	5	7	7	7	7	7	7	7
Anduud City	8	8	8	8	8	8	8	8	8	8	8	8	8	8	8	8	8	8
UB Mazaalaynuud	9	9	9	9	9	9	9	9	9	9	9	9	9	9	9	9	9	9
Gepro	10	10	10	10	10	10	10	10	10	10	10	10	10	10	10	10	10	10

Qualification for AFC Cup preliminary round 2
Relegation to Mongolian 1st League

Source: Flashscore

== Results ==
Home \ Away	AND	ATH	DER	FAL	KHK	KHN	GEP	UBM	ULA	ULC
Anduud City	—	1–4	0–0	2–8	2–14	0–2	2–0	1–2	1–5	1–2
Athletic 220	3–0	—	2–0	1–0	2–0	2–4	6–1	10–1	3–0	0–1
Deren	1–0	1–3	—	1–5	1–0	2–2	7–0	6–1	1–2	2–0
Falcons	3–1	1–1	1–0	—	0–1	1–1	6–0	3–0	2–4	5–0
Khaan Khuns-Erchim	5–1	0–0	1–2	2–1	—	1–0	5–1	6–0	0–1	1–1
Khangarid	8–2	1–1	1–2	1–3	5–4	—	9–0	2–0	1–0	2–1
Gepro	1–3	1–8	0–5	0–1	0–13	1–5	—	0–3	2–3	0–10
UB Mazaalaynuud	0–3	0–5	0–5	0–5	0–6	1–5	1–0	—	0–6	0–5
Ulaanbaatar	9–1	2–2	2–3	2–1	1–2	2–1	6–0	6–1	—	4–0
Ulaanbaatar City	5–0	0–3	1–1	1–3	2–3	1–2	4–0	3–0	1–1	—

Source: Soccerway
Legend: Blue = home team win; Yellow = draw; Red = away team win.
For upcoming matches, an "a" indicates there is an article about the rivalry between the two participants.

== Season's progress ==
Team ╲ Round	1	2	3	4	5	6	7	8	9	10	11	12	13	14	15	16	17	18
Anduud City	L	L	D	L	L	W	W	L	L	L	L	L	L	L	L	W	L	L
Athletic 220	D	W	W	L	D	L	W	W	W	W	W	W	W	W	D	W	W	D
Deren	L	L	D	W	D	W	W	L	W	L	W	W	W	W	W	D	L	W
Falcons	W	W	L	W	W	W	L	D	L	W	W	L	W	W	W	L	W	D
Gepro	L	L	L	L	L	L	L	L	L	L	L	L	L	L	L	L	L	L
Khaan Khuns-Erchim	W	D	W	L	D	L	W	W	W	W	W	W	W	L	L	W	L	W
Khangarid	W	W	W	W	W	W	L	D	W	W	W	W	L	W	D	D	L	L
UB Mazaalaynuud	L	L	L	L	L	L	L	W	L	L	L	L	L	L	W	L	W	L
Ulaanbaatar	D	W	W	W	W	W	D	L	L	L	L	W	W	W	W	W	W	W
Ulaanbaatar City	W	D	L	W	D	L	D	W	W	W	L	L	L	L	L	L	W	W

Source: Flashscore
W = Win; D = Draw; L = Lose

== Top goalscorers ==
Rank	Goalscorer	Team	Goals
1	(Mongolia) Nyam-Osor Naranbold	Athletic 220	29
2	(Mongolia) Mönkh-Erdengiin Tögöldör	Falcons	18
3	(Mongolia) Batkhishig Myagmar	Ulaanbaatar	16
4	(Mongolia) Temuujin Altansukh	Athletic 220	14
5	(Mongolia) Baljinnyam Batbold	Ulaanbaatar	13
6	(Mongolia) Tortogtokh Enkh-Erdene	Khangarid	12
6	(Mongolia) Mönkh-Orgil Orkhon	Deren	12
6	(Mongolia) Gankhuyag Ser-Od-Yanjiv	Khangarid	12
6	(Mongolia) Tsedenbalyn Tümenjargal	Khaan Khuns-Erchim	12

== Multiple hat-tricks ==
Player	For	Against	Score	Date
(Mongolia) Tortogtokh Enkh-Erdene^{5}	Khangarid	Sumida Gepro	9–0	8 July 2020
(Mongolia) Batbilguun Gaanbatar	Erchim	Mazaalainuud	6–0	17 July 2020
(Mongolia) Nyam-Osor Naranbold^{6}	Athletic 220	Sumida Gepro	1–8	19 July 2020
(Mongolia) Myagmar Bathishig	Ulaanbaatar	Mazaalainuud	0–6	24 July 2020
(Mongolia) Mönkh-Orgil Orkhon	Deren	Sumida Gepro	7–0	25 July 2020
(Mongolia) Nyam-Osor Naranbold^{8}	Athletic 220	Mazaalainuud	10–1	7 August 2020
(Mongolia) Mönkh-Orgil Orkhon	Deren	Mazaalainuud	6–1	16 August 2020
(Mongolia) Tsagaansooj Enkhtur	Erchim	Anduud City	5–1	17 August 2020
(Mongolia) Temuujin Altansukh	Ulaanbaatar City	Mazaalainuud	0–5	21 August 2020
(Mongolia) Ganbold Battulga	Falcons	Deren	1–5	22 August 2020
(Mongolia) Gankhuyag Ser-Od-Yanjiv	Khangarid	Anduud City	8–2	22 August 2020
(Mongolia) Nyam-Osor Naranbold	Athletic 220	Anduud City	1–4	27 August 2020
(Mongolia) Tsedenbalyn Tümenjargal	Erchim	Mazaalainuud	0–6	29 August 2020
(Mongolia) Nyam-Osor Naranbold	Athletic 220	Sumida Gepro	6–1	30 August 2020
(Mongolia) Baljinnyam Batbold	Ulaanbaatar	Falcons	2–4	30 August 2020
(Mongolia) Mönkh-Orgil Orkhon	Deren	Sumida Gepro	0–5	4 September 2020
(Mongolia) Janserik Maratkhan	Falcons	Anduud City	2–8	5 September 2020
(Mongolia) Baljinnyam Batbold	Ulaanbaatar	Mazaalainuud	6–1	5 September 2020
(Mongolia) Tuguldur Munkh-Erdene	Falcons	Sumida Gepro	6–0	8 September 2020
(Mongolia) Baljinnyam Batbold	Ulaanbaatar	Anduud City	9–1	9 September 2020
(Mongolia) Narmandakh Artag^{4}	Ulaanbaatar City	Sumida Gepro	0–10	26 September 2020
(Mongolia) Gal-Erdene Soyol-Erdene^{4}	Erchim	Anduud City	2–14	27 September 2020
(Mongolia) Gantumur Ankhbayar	Erchim	Anduud City	2–14	27 September 2020
