= 2021 Mongolian National Premier League =

Mongolian Premier League season

Mongolian National Premier League
- Season: 2021
- Dates: 1 August – 3 October 2021
- Champions: Athletic 220 FC
- Relegated: U. Mazaalaynuud FC
- Matches: 90
- Goals: 155 (1.72 per match)
- Top goalscorer: (Japan) Tetsuaki Misawa (17 goals)
- Biggest home win: Athletic 220 FC 7–2 Khangarid FC (8 August 2021)
- Biggest away win: Khoromkhon 0–6 Deren FC (5 August 2021)
- Highest scoring: Athletic 220 FC 7–2 Khangarid FC (8 August 2021)
- Longest winning run: Athletic 220 FC (7 matches)
- Longest unbeaten run: FC Ulaanbaatar (8 matches)
- Longest winless run: Ulaanbaataryi Mazaalaynuud (18 matches)
- Longest losing run: Ulaanbaataryi Mazaalaynuud (8 matches)
- All statistics correct as of 12 March 2022.

The 2021 Mongolian National Premier League was the 53rd season of the Mongolian National Premier League. The season began on 1 August and ended on 3 October 2021. This is the first year without sponsorship Mazala after three years of partnership.

== Teams ==
Club	City	Stadium	Capacity
Athletic 220 FC	Ulaanbaatar	MFF Football Centre	5,000
BCH Lions	Ulaanbaatar	MFF Football Centre	5,000
Deren	Ulaanbaatar	National Sports Stadium	12,000
SP Falcons	Ulaanbaatar	MFF Football Centre	5,000
Khaan Khuns Erchim	Ulaanbaatar	MFF Football Centre	5,000
Khangarid FC	Erdenet	MFF Football Centre	5,000
Khoromkhon FC	Ulaanbaatar	MFF Football Centre	5,000
Khovd FC	Ulaanbaatar	MFF Football Centre	5,000
FC Ulaanbaatar	Ulaanbaatar	MFF Football Centre	5,000
Ulaanbaatar City	Ulaanbaatar	G-Mobile Arena	3,000

== League table ==
Pos	Team	Pld	W	D	L	GF	GA	GD	Pts	Qualification
1	Athletic 220 (C)	18	13	1	4	42	20	+22	40	Qualification for AFC Cup group stage
2	Deren	18	11	2	5	32	19	+13	35	
3	SP Falcons	18	11	2	5	38	24	+14	35	
4	FC Ulaanbaatar	18	9	6	3	34	16	+18	33	
5	Khaan Khuns Erchim	18	9	3	6	33	19	+14	30	
6	Ulaanbaatar City	18	9	2	7	42	40	+2	29	
7	Khangarid	18	5	3	10	30	45	−15	18	
8	BCH Lions	18	5	2	11	36	51	−15	17	
9	Khoromkhon (R)	18	5	2	11	31	47	−16	17	Qualification to relegation play-offs
10	Mazaalainuud FC (R)	18	0	3	15	12	49	−37	3	Relegation to Mongolian 1st League

Source: Soccerway
Rules for classification: 1) Points; 2) Head-to-head points; 3) Head-to-head goal difference; 4) Head-to-head goals scored; 5) Goal difference; 6) Goals scored.
(C) Champions; (R) Relegated

== Top goalscorers ==
Rank	Players	Club	Goals
1	(Japan) Tetsuaki Misawa	BCH Lions	16
2	(Mongolia) Nyam-Osor Naranbold	Athletic 220	15
3	(Russia) Pavel Zakharov	Ulaanbaatar City	14
4	(Mongolia) B Usukh-Ireedui	Deren	13
5	(Mongolia) Tsedenbalyn Tümenjargal	Erchim	11
6	(Ivory Coast) Koffi Konan	Falcons	10
7	(Mongolia) Baljinnyam Batbold	Ulaanbaatar	8
7	(Mongolia) Mönkh-Erdene Batkhishig	Athletic 220	8
7	(Mongolia) Tortogtokh Enkh-Erdene	khangarid	8
7	(Mongolia) Oyunbaatar Mijiddorj	Ulaanbaatar City	8
7	(Mongolia) Oyuunbatyn Bayarjargal	Ulaanbaatar	8
7	(Nigeria) Michael Adeyemo	Khoromkhon	8

== Multiple hat-tricks ==
Player	For	Against	Score	Date
(Mongolia) Tortogtokh Enkh-Erdene	Khangarid	Lions	5–3	4 August 2021
(Mongolia) Nyam-Osor Naranbold	Athletic 220	Khangarid	7–2	7 August 2021
(Ivory Coast) Koffi Konan^{4}	Falcons	Lions	5–1	10 August 2021
(Russia) Pavel Zakharov	Ulaanbaatar City	Lions	3–1	17 August 2021
(Mongolia) Oyuunbatyn Bayarjargal	Ulaanbaatar	Mazaalainuud	4–0	28 August 2021
(Mongolia) Tsedenbalyn Tümenjargal	Erchim	Mazaalainuud	2–5	11 September 2021
(Russia) Pavel Zakharov	Ulaanbaatar	Khoromkhon	7–4	18 September 2021
(Mongolia) Nyam-Osor Naranbold	Athletic 220	Ulaanbaatar City	3–4	26 September 2021
