= Manuel Retamero =

Spanish footballer and manager

Personal information
- Full name: Manuel Retamero Fraile
- Date of birth: 1 December 1974 (age 51)
- Place of birth: Valladolid, Spain

Senior career*
Years	Team	Apps	(Gls)
- Villa Simancas
- Boecillo
- Betis Valladolid
- Cuéllar
- Íscar

Managerial career
- 2000–2001: Arces (youth)
- 2001–2002: Betis Valladolid (youth)
- 2002–2003: Villa Simancas (youth)
- 2003–2006: Betis Valladolid (youth)
- 2006–2007: Unión Delicias (youth)
- 2007–2010: Íscar
- 2010–2011: Valladolid B
- 2012–2013: La Granja
- 2014: Al-Ittihad Tripoli (youth)
- 2015: Milford United
- 2015–2016: Aizawl
- 2016: Budaiya
- 2017–2018: Ulaanbaatar City
- 2018–2019: NEROCA FC
- 2022: Kirivong Sok Sen Chey
- * Club domestic league appearances and goals

Manuel Retamero Fraile (born 1 December 1974) is a Spanish football manager and former player.

== Playing career ==
Born in Valladolid, Castile and León, Retamero only played regional football during his career, representing CD Villa de Simancas, CD Boecillo, CD Betis CF, CD Cuéllar Balompié and CD Íscar, all in his native region.

== Coaching career ==
=== Early career ===
Retamero established himself as a youth manager during his first years; he was in charge of CD Arces, Betis Valladolid (two stints), Villa de Simancas and CD Unión Delicias. In 2007, he was named manager of Tercera División side Íscar, achieving mid-table positions during his three-season spell at the club.

On 16 July 2010, Retamero was appointed manager of Real Valladolid B also in the fourth division. On 28 June 2012, after nearly one year of inactivity, he was presented as manager of CD La Granja in the same division.

In January 2014, Retamero moved to Libya and joined Al-Ittihad Club as their technical director; he was later also given the role of under-19 manager. He left the country in June, shortly after the start of the Libyan Civil War, and moved to Bahrain as a director of the national team.

=== Aizawl ===
On 19 August 2015, after a short stint at United States' Milford United SC, Retamero was appointed manager of I-League side Aizawl FC. His first goal was to win the Mizoram Premier League, which he achieved on 16 December 2015. His first professional match occurred on 9 January 2016, a 1–3 away loss against Mohun Bagan AC.

On 7 February 2016, Retanero was sacked by Aizawl and was replaced by Jahar Das.

=== Ulaanbaatar City ===
In December 2016, after a short spell at Budaiya Club in Bahrain, Retamero signed for Ulaanbaatar City FC, replacing countryman Rodrigo Hernando. In his first season in charge, the club finished second in the league, and knocked out Erchim FC (the defending league champions) in the semi-finals of the MFF Cup before defeating FC Ulaanbaatar in the finals to win the club's first major trophy in its brief history.

On 2 January 2018, Retamero was announced as manager of CD Victoria CF, a youth football club from his hometown. Seven days later, however, he opted to continue in charge of Ulaanbaatar.

=== NEROCA FC ===
On 7 June 2018, Retamero returned to India after being named at the helm of NEROCA FC.

== Managerial statistics ==
As of 15 December 2018.

Team	From	To	Record				
Team	From	To	G	W	D	L	Win %
Aizawl	17 August 2015	7 February 2016	6	1	1	4	16.67
Ulaanbaatar	December 2016	June 2018	44	26	7	11	59.09
NEROCA	1 July 2018	1 July 2019	20	7	6	7	35.00
Total			44	20	9	15	45.45

== Honours ==
=== Manager ===
Aizawl

- Mizoram Premier League: 2015–16

Ulaanbaatar City

- Mongolian Premier League: runner-up 2017
- MFF Cup: 2017; runner-up 2018
- MFF Super Cup: 2018
