= 2018 Mongolian Premier League =

Football league season in Mongolia

Mongolian Premier League
- Season: 2018
- Dates: 28 April – 10 June
- Champions: Erchim (12th title)
- Relegated: Arvis; Gepro
- AFC Cup: Erchim
- Matches: 90
- Goals: 312 (3.47 per match)
- Top goalscorer: (Japan) Tatsuya Nishio (16 goals)
- Biggest home win: Athletic 220 9–0 Gepro (26 May 2018)
- Biggest away win: Arvis 0–8 Deren (13 May 2018); Arvis 0–8 Khangarid (19 May 2018)
- Highest scoring: Athletic 220 9–0 Gepro (26 May 2018); Ulaanbaatar City 6–3 Arvis (21 July 2018); Erchim 8–1 Selenge Press (26 September 2018); Arvis 2–7 Erchim (6 October 2018)
- Longest winning run: Erchim (6 games)
- Longest unbeaten run: Erchim (11 games)
- Longest winless run: Gepro (18 games)
- Longest losing run: Arvis (10 games)

The 2018 Mongolian Premier League (also known as the Khurkhree National Premier League) is the 50th edition of the top-tier football league in Mongolia. Erchim comes into the season as defending champions of the 2017 season.

Arvis FC and Gepro FC entered as the two promoted teams from the Mongolian 1st League while Khoromkhon FC and Ulaanbaataryn Unaganuud FC were relegated.

The season started on 28 April 2018.

== Clubs and locations ==
Location of teams in 2018 Mongolian Premier League

Club	City	Stadium	Capacity
Arvis	Ulaanbaatar	MFF Football Centre	3,500
Athletic 220	Ulaanbaatar	MFF Football Centre	3,500
Deren	Deren	National Sports Stadium	12,500
Erchim	Ulaanbaatar	Erchim Stadium	2,000
Gepro	Ulaanbaatar	MFF Football Centre	3,500
Anduud City Club	Ulaanbaatar	MFF Football Centre	3,500
Khangarid	Erdenet	Erdenet Stadium	7,000
Selenge Press FC	Ulaanbaatar	MFF Football Centre	3,500
FC Ulaanbaatar	Ulaanbaatar	MFF Football Centre	3,500
Ulaanbaatar City	Ulaanbaatar	G-Mobile Arena	3,000

== League table ==
Pos	Team	Pld	W	D	L	GF	GA	GD	Pts	Qualification or relegation
1	Erchim	18	12	5	1	52	17	+35	41	Qualification to AFC Cup preliminary round
2	Ulaanbaatar	18	10	7	1	41	17	+24	37	
3	Anduud City	18	10	5	3	31	18	+13	35	
4	Athletic 220	18	9	6	3	39	15	+24	33	
5	Deren	18	8	7	3	41	15	+26	31	
6	Ulaanbaatar City	18	7	5	6	30	28	+2	26	
7	Khangarid	18	4	6	8	24	26	−2	18	
8	Selenge Press	18	3	4	11	22	41	−19	13	
9	Arvis	18	2	4	12	24	62	−38	10	Relegation to 1st League
10	Gepro	18	0	1	17	8	73	−65	1	Relegation to 1st League

Source: Mongolian Football Federation
Rules for classification: 1) Points; 2) Goal difference; 3) Goals scored; 4) Away goals scored; 5) Head to Head;

== See also ==
- 2018 Mongolia Cup
