= 2017 MFF Cup =

Football tournament season in Mongolia

Mongolian Football Federation Cup

Tournament details
- Country: Mongolia
- Teams: 30 (overall)

Final positions
- Champions: Ulaanbaatar City FC
- Runners-up: FC Ulaanbaatar

Tournament statistics
- Matches played: 27
- Goals scored: 192 (7.11 per match)

The 2017 MFF Cup is the tenth edition of the MFF Cup, the knockout football tournament in Mongolia.

It is sponsored by Arvain Undes. 30 teams were accepted into the tournament. It began with the 1st Round in 2017.

Mongolian Premier League side Erchim were the defending champions.

== Teams ==
Round	Clubs remaining	Winners from previous round	New entries this round
First round	28	none	none
Second round	16	14	2
Quarter-finals	8	8	none
Semi-finals	4	4	none
Final	2	2	none

== First round ==
Results:

23 May 2017	United Frees "Юнайтед Фрейндс"	1–3	Tuul Big Tigers "Туулын Том Тулнууд"

26 May 2017	Be Forward "Сонгинохайрхан-Би Форвард"	0–10	Athletic 220 FC

28 May 2017	Sharyl Gol "Шарын гол"	5–2	Delta "Дельта"

12 June 2017	UB Mazaalai "УБ Мазаалайнууд"	0–1	King Food "Хаан хүнс"

13 June 2017	Goyo	7–1	SM Bayangol "ШМ Баянгол"

14 June 2017	Mongolian Dream "Монголын Тэмүүлэл"	3–5	Gepro

15 June 2017	Western "Вестерн"	0–11	Deren FC

19 June 2017	Arvis	6–0	HAD "ХАД"

20 June 2017	Ulaanbaatar City	3–1	Khangard "Хангарьд"

2 July 2017	Töv Province "Төв аймаг"	5–2	Soyombo Bars "Соёмбын барсууд"

9 July 2017	Erchim FC	13–0	Bayankhongor Province "Баянхонгор аймаг"

Falcons "Шонхорууд"	0–11	Khoromkhon

DMYu	2–0	Sumida "Сумида"

26 July 2017	FC Ulaanbaatar	4–1	Unaganuud "Унаганууд"

== Second round ==
1 August 2017	Töv Province "Төв аймаг"	4–14	DMYu

3 August 2017	Athletic 220	13–0	Dundgovi Province "Дундговь аймаг"

8 August 2017	Tuul Big Tigers "Туулын Том Тулнууд"	0–9	Ulaanbaatar City

10 August 2017	Deren FC	8–1	King Food "Хаан хүнс"

15 August 2017	Gepro	1–4	Khoromkhon FC

16 August 2017	Erchim FC	1–1 (aet, 4–3 p)	FC Selengepress

Goyo	2–0 (aet)	Arvis

Sharyl Gol (Шарын гол)	0–7	FC Ulaanbaatar

== Quarter-finals ==
6 September 2017	Ulaanbaatar City	14–0	DMYu

6 September 2017	Khoromkhon FC	0–4	Erchim FC

6 September 2017	Deren FC	4–1	Athletic 220 FC

13 September 2017	Goyo	0–4	FC Ulaanbaatar

== Semi-finals ==
26 September 2017	Ulaanbaatar City	1–0	Erchim

27 September 2017	FC Ulaanbaatar	3–2 (a.e.t.)	Deren

== Final ==
8 October 2017

Ulaanbaatar City	4–2	FC Ulaanbaatar

Referee: Tumenbayar Doljinrusen

== See also ==
- 2017 Mongolian Premier League
