= Anduud City FC =

Association football club in Mongolia

Anduud City Андууд Сити
- Full name: Anduud City Football Club
- Founded: 2013; 13 years ago
- Ground: MFF Football Centre; Ulaanbaatar, Mongolia
- Capacity: 5,000
- Owner: B. Sainkhüü
- Chairman: Christian Wolf
- Manager: Donorovyn Lümbengarav
- League: Mongolian Premier League
- 2020: Mongolian Premier League, 8th of 10
Home colours	Away colours

Anduud City Football Club (Mongolian: Андууд Сити) is a professional football club based in Ulaanbaatar, Mongolia, that competed in the Mongolian Premier League.

== History ==
The club was established in July 2013. In 2016 the club finished in fourth place in the National Amateur Cup and won the right to compete in the Mongolian 1st League. The team won the league championship that season and qualified for the Mongolian Premier League for the 2017 season.

The club was named Goyo FC until the 2018 season. At that time the team was renamed Anduud City Club as part of a major sponsorship commitment to modernize and professionalize the club. They won their first match under their new name in May 2018 against Khangarid FC with the only goal scored by Batbayar Khash-Erdene.

== Domestic history ==
Season	League							Domestic Cup	Notes	Ref.
Season	Div.	Pos.	Pl.	W	D	L	P	Domestic Cup	Notes	Ref.
2016	2nd	1st	18	16	1	1	49		Promoted to Mongolian Premier League	
2017	1st	7th	18	5	5	8	20	Quarterfinals		
2018	1st	3rd	18	10	5	3	35	Quarterfinals		
2019	1st	8th	22	9	1	12	28	First Round		
2020	1st									

== Players ==
=== Current squad ===
As of 20 April 2019

Note: Flags indicate national team as defined under FIFA eligibility rules; some limited exceptions apply. Players may hold more than one non-FIFA nationality.

No.	Pos.	Nation	Player
1	GK	UZB	Alisher Akhmedov
22	GK	MGL	Tsendjav Dagvasuren
2	DF	MGL	Gandan Zanbaatar
3	DF	MGL	Tserendovdon Bayanjargal
4	DF	MGL	Dukh Sukhbat
5	DF	MGL	Tsevelmaa Bat-Orgil
6	DF	MGL	Enkhzorig Hien-Yaahav
9	DF	MGL	Tsetsegmaa Bilguun
18	DF	MGL	Buman-Urus Uuganbaayar
8	MF	MGL	Munkhtulga Tsogtbaatar
12	MF	MGL	Tormunkh Monkhsuld
14	MF	RUS	Rostislav Romanenko
15	MF	MGL	Batbaysgalan Suvdaya

No.	Pos.	Nation	Player
17	MF	MGL	Enkh-Od Munkhbat
19	MF	MGL	Battulga Bat-Erdene
20	MF	MGL	Bayartsogt Zorigtbaatar
20	MF	MGL	Tumenjargal Dashdorj
21	MF	MGL	Unenbat Tsogtsaikhan
9	FW	MGL	Erdene-Ochir Mungunbagana
10	FW	MGL	Enkhbileg Purevdorj
11	FW	MGL	Sukhbaatar Enkhsaikhan
13	FW	MGL	Batbayar Khash-Erdene
16	FW	MGL	Gantulga Ganhuyag
23	FW	MGL	Boldkhuu Ariunbold
23	FW	MGL	Sukhbaatar Enkhbold
33	FW	MGL	Nyamdorj Ölziimyagmar

== Managerial history ==
Nat.	Name	Tenure	Ref.
Mongolia	Gongorjav Davaa-Ochir	2015 to 2019	
Serbia	Vojislav Bralušić	26 March 2019 to October 2021	
Mongolia	Donorovyn Lümbengarav	June 2020 to present	
