= 2016 Mongolian Premier League =

Football league season in Mongolia

Mongolian Premier League
- Season: 2016
- 2017 AFC Cup: Erchim
- Matches: 90
- Goals: 375 (4.17 per match)
- Top goalscorer: Oyunbaatar Mijiddorj (29 goals)
- Biggest home win: Erchim 8–0 Mazaalaynuud; Erchim 8–0 Ulaanbaatar
- Biggest away win: Mazaalay 0–8 Selenge Press
- Highest scoring: Erchim 8–0 Mazaalaynuud; Erchim 8–0 Ulaanbaatar; Khangarid 6–2 Unaganuud; Selenge Press 6–2 Bayangol
- Longest winning run: Erchim (14 games)
- Longest unbeaten run: Erchim (14 games)
- Longest winless run: Mazaalaynuud (18 games)
- Longest losing run: Mazaalaynuud (16 games)

The 2016 Mongolian Premier League (also known as the Khurkhree National Premier League) is the 48th edition of the tournament. Erchim came into the season as defending champions of the 2015 season.

Ulaanbaatar City (formerly Khangarid City) and Bayngol entered as the two promoted teams from the 2015 Mongolian 1st League. The season started on May 7 and ended on October 9, 2016.

== Khurkhree National Premier League ==
The competition is to be known as the Khurkhree National Premier League for sponsorship reasons, after the Mongolian Football Federation signed a MNT 400 million sponsorship deal with Arvain Undes, a Mongolian company that produces the beer, Khurkhree.

== Clubs ==
=== Clubs and locations ===
Location of teams in 2016 Mongolian Premier League

Club	City	Stadium	Capacity
Bayangol	Ulaanbaatar	MFF Football Centre	3,500
Deren	Deren	MFF Football Centre	3,500
Erchim	Ulaanbaatar	Erchim Stadium	2,000
FC Ulaanbaatar	Ulaanbaatar	MFF Football Centre	3,500
Khangarid	Erdenet	Erdenet Stadium	7,000
Ulaanbaatar City	Ulaanbaatar	MFF Football Centre	3,500
Khoromkhon	Ulaanbaatar	MFF Football Centre	3,500
Selenge Press	Ulaanbaatar	MFF Football Centre	3,500
Ulaanbaataryn Unaganuud	Ulaanbaatar	MFF Football Centre	3,500

== Results ==
=== League table ===
Pos	Team	Pld	W	D	L	GF	GA	GD	Pts	Qualification or relegation
1	Erchim (C, Q)	18	17	0	1	70	12	+58	51	2017 AFC Cup
2	Khangarid	18	14	1	3	54	23	+31	43	
3	Khoromkhon	18	10	2	6	42	25	+17	32	
4	Ulaanbaataryn Unaganuud	18	10	2	6	40	28	+12	32	
5	Deren	18	8	1	9	28	27	+1	25	
6	Ulaanbaatar	18	6	5	7	33	41	−8	23	
7	Selenge Press	18	6	4	8	43	40	+3	22	
8	Ulaanbaatar City (O)	18	6	3	9	32	32	0	21	Play-Off
9	NM Bayangol (R)	18	2	3	13	24	57	−33	9	1st League
10	Ulaanbaataryn Mazaalainuud (R)	18	0	1	17	9	90	−81	1	1st League

Updated to match(es) played on 4 September 2016. Source:
Rules for classification: 1) points; 2) goal difference; 3) number of goals scored.
(C) Champions; (O) Play-off winners; (Q) Qualified for the phase indicated; (R) Relegated

=== Result table ===
Home \ Away	DER	ERC	KHA	KHO	NMB	SEL	UBC	UBM	UBU	ULB
Deren		0–3	1–3	0–2	2–1	1–2	1–0	4–0	0–4	4–1
Erchim	2–1		5–1	0–2	1–0	6–1	5–1	8–0	3–1	8–0
Khangarid	2–0	0–4		2–0	5–1	6–2	2–1	7–0	6–2	2–0
Khoromkhon	0–3	0–4	2–3		7–1	0–0	2–0	4–1	3–1	1–1
NM Bayangol	1–3	1–5	0–6	1–5		2–3	2–3	1–1	1–1	2–1
Selenge Press	2–2	1–3	0–2	1–2	6–2		1–2	7–0	2–5	3–2
Ulaanbaatar City	1–4	1–2	1–2	1–3	2–2	1–1		7–1	1–0	1–2
Ulaanbaataryn Mazaalainuud	0–1	1–4	0–2	1–6	0–4	0–8	1–6		1–6	1–3
Ulaanbaataryn Unaganuud	1–0	0–1	2–1	2–1	2–1	2–1	0–2	7–1		2–2
Ulaanbaatar	2–1	1–6	2–2	3–2	4–1	2–2	1–1	5–0	1–2	

Legend: Blue = home team win; Yellow = draw; Red = away team win.

== Top goalscorers ==
Rank	Player	Team	Goals
1	(Mongolia) Oyunbaatar Mijiddorj	Khangarid	29
2	(Japan) Shuta Ishino		28
3	(Mongolia) Nyam-Osor Naranbold	Khoromkhon	13
3	(Mongolia) Mönkh-Erdene Tuguldur		13
5	Fante		12
6	(Mongolia) Eson-Erdene		10
6	(Japan) Hishida		10
8	(Mongolia) Monkh-Erdene		8
8	Navrodski		8
8	(Mongolia) Enkhbileg Purevdorj	Anduud City	8
