= 2017 Mongolian First League =

Football tournament season in Mongolia

2017 Mongolia First League

Tournament details
- Country: Mongolia
- Dates: 2017
- Teams: 10

Final positions
- Champions: Arvis FC
- Runners-up: Gepro FC
- All statistics correct as of 21-04-21.

2017 Mongolian First League (often referred to as the 2017 Mongolian 1st League) is Second-highest division of the Mongolia.

== Participating teams ==
- Arvis FC
- Gepro FC
- Khaan Khuns Crown Club
- Western FC
- Dornod Aymag FC
- Khad FC
- Saryn Gol FC
- SM Bayangol FC
- Soëmbyn Barsuud FC
- Ulaanbaataryn Mazaalaynuud FC

== Promoted Teams ==
With 14 wins, 1 draw and 3 losses the Arvis FC team added 43 points and finished the competition in first place. With that, in addition to the title of champion of the competition, the team won the right to compete in the Mongolian Premier League next season.

With only six points less, team Gepro FC finished the competition in second place and was also promoted to the Mongolian Premier League. The team managed to add 37 points with 12 wins, 1 draw and 5 losses.

== Demoted Teams ==
With four wins, and fourteen losses, the Dornod Aymag FC team scored just 12 points and was relegated together with the debuting KhAD FC team who had 13 defeats, 3 draws and 2 wins.

== Final classification ==
1.Arvis FC                    18  14  1  3  65-19  43       Promoted
2.Gepro FC                    18  12  1  5  50-25  37       Promoted

3.Khaan Khuns Crown Club      18  11  4  3  54-27  37  [*]
4.Ulaanbaataryi Mazaalaynuud  18  11  3  4  39-25  36  [R]
5.SM Bayangol FC              18   9  2  7  49-38  29  [R]
6.Soëmbyn Barsuud             18   6  4  8  30-38  22
7.Western FC                  18   6  3  9  44-43  21
8.Şaryn Gol                   18   4  1 13  31-82  13

9.Dornod Aymag                18   4  0 14  32-51  12  [P]
10.KhAD FC                    18   2  3 13  16-62   9  [P]
