= 2018 MFF Cup =

Football tournament season in Mongolia

Mongolian Football Federation Cup

Tournament details
- Country: Mongolia

Final positions
- Champions: Athletic 220 FC
- Runners-up: Ulaanbaatar City FC

The 2018 MFF Cup is the 11th edition of the MFF Cup, the knockout football tournament in Mongolia.

== First round ==
Results:

== Second round ==
The draw was held on 31 May 2018.

Results:

== Third round ==
The draw was held on 25 June 2018.

Results:

== Quarter-finals ==
The draw was held on 31 July 2018.

Results:

== Semi-finals ==
Results:

| 11 September 2018, 19:00: | Ulaanbaatar City | 3-3 (4-2 p) | Khangarid FC |

| 12 September 2018, 19:00: | Athletic 220 FC | 4-2 | Erchim FC |

== Final ==
| 3 October 2018, 18:00: | Ulaanbaatar City | 0-2 | Athletic 220 FC |

== Bracket ==
Round of 16
Athletic 220 | 18
Nomadic Hunters FC | 0
Khoromkhon | 1
Khovd | 0
Erchim | 6
Khovd Western | 1
SP Falcons | 0
Ulaanbaataryn Unaganuud | 1
Ulaanbaatar | 3
Anduud City | 4
Ulaanbaatar City | 4
Deren | 3
Khan-Uul | 3
DMU | 5
Ulaanbaataryn Mazaalainuud | 0
Khangarid | 6

Quarter-finals
Athletic 220 | 5
Khoromkhon | 3
Erchim | 2
Ulaanbaataryn Unaganuud | 0
Anduud City | 0
Ulaanbaatar City | 2
DMU | 0
Khangarid | 3

Semi-finals
Athletic 220 | 4
Erchim | 2
Ulaanbaatar City (p) | 3 (4)
Khangarid | 3 (2)

Final
Athletic 220 | 2
Ulaanbaatar City | 0

== See also ==
- 2018 Mongolian Premier League
