= Athletic 220 FC =

Association football club in Mongolia

Athletic 220 Атлетик 220
- Full name: Athletic 220 Football Club
- Founded: 2016
- Dissolved: 2022
- Ground: MFF Football Centre
- Capacity: 5,000
- Owner: Manlai Bat-Orshikh
- Chairman: Bilguun Bat-Erdene
- League: Mongolian Premier League
- 2021-22: Mongolian National Premier League, 7th of 10

Athletic 220 Football Club (Mongolian: Атлетик 220) was a Mongolian professional football club based in Ulaanbaatar, that competed in the Mongolian Premier League. The club was established in 2016, and was promoted to the Mongolian Premier League after emerging runners-up in the Mongolia 1st League the same year. In August 2022 it was announced that, despite a string of success including two appearances in the AFC Cup, the club had withdrawn from the Mongolian Premier League because of financial difficulties.

== History ==
=== Domestic ===
Season	League									Mongolia Cup	Mongolia Super Cup	Top goalscorer	
Season	Div.	Pos.	Pl.	W	D	L	GS	GA	P	Mongolia Cup	Mongolia Super Cup	Name	League
2016	2nd	2nd	18	13	3	2	75	31	42	Quarter-finals	/	?	?
2017	1st	3rd	18	10	4	4	32	21	34	Quarter-finals	/	Nyam-Osor Naranbold	17
2018	1st	4th	18	9	6	3	39	15	33	Champion	The First Runners-up	Nyam-Osor Naranbold	27
2019	1st	4th	22	10	6	6	52	38	36	Semi-finals	/	Nyam-Osor Naranbold	22
2020	1st	1st	18	12	4	2	56	14	40	/	The First Runners-up	Nyam-Osor Naranbold	29
2021	1st	1st	18	13	1	4	42	20	40	/	The First Runners-up	Nyam-Osor Naranbold	12
2021–22	1st	7th	18	3	5	10	18	31	14				

== Continental record ==
Competition	Pld	W	D	L	GF	GA	Pts
AFC Cup	4	0	0	4	2	11	0
Total	4	0	0	4	2	11	0

Season	Competition	Round	Club	Home	Away	Aggregate
2021	AFC Cup	Group J				
2021	AFC Cup	Group J	(Chinese Taipei) Tainan City	0–3		4th
2021	AFC Cup	Group J	(Hong Kong) Eastern	0–1		4th
2021	AFC Cup	Group J	(Hong Kong) Lee Man	1–5		4th
2022	AFC Cup	Play-off round	(Hong Kong) Lee Man	1–2		

== Current squad ==
As of 16 July 2022

Note: Flags indicate national team as defined under FIFA eligibility rules; some limited exceptions apply. Players may hold more than one non-FIFA nationality.

No.	Pos.	Nation	Player
1	GK	MGL	Mönkh-Erdene Enkhtaivan
2	DF	MGL	Enkhzorig Khench-Yakhav
3	DF	JPN	Yoshimitsu Yamamoto
4	DF	RUS	Andrey Petrov
5	DF	MGL	Bat-Erdene Chinzorig
6	MF	MGL	Gerelbayar Yondonjamts
7	MF	MGL	Otgonbayar Khantenger
8	MF	MGL	Javkhlan Bagachoimbo
9	FW	MGL	Enkhbileg Pürevdorj
11	MF	MGL	Temuujin Altansukh
12	MF	MGL	Ulzii-Od Baatar

No.	Pos.	Nation	Player
13	GK	MGL	Temuujin Batdorj
15	DF	JPN	Tsutomu Hasegawa
16	FW	MGL	Enkhtulga Bat-Urnukh
17	MF	MGL	Unenkhuu Gantumur
19	MF	MGL	Buyant Munkhbat
21	MF	MGL	Amarzaya Erdembileg
22	MF	MGL	Yesu-Ochir Odmandakh
23	DF	MGL	Enkh-Orgil Otgonbaatar
24	MF	MGL	Bulgantamir Gantulga
30	GK	MGL	Gantulga Tulgabaya
92	FW	JPN	Ken Murayama
