= Khash-Erdene Batbayar =

Mongolian footballer

Personal information
- Full name: Batbayaryn Khash-Erdene; Батбаярын Хаш-Эрдэнэ
- Date of birth: 20 June 1997 (age 29)
- Place of birth: Mongolia
- Position: Forward

Team information
- Current team: Anduud City FC
- Number: 13

Senior career*
Years	Team	Apps	(Gls)
2018–	Anduud City FC		(13)

International career^{‡}
2018–	Mongolia	1	(0)
- * Club domestic league appearances and goals as of 22:19, 25 April 2019 (UTC) ‡ National team caps and goals as of 22:19, 25 April 2019 (UTC)

Batbayaryn Khash-Erdene (Mongolian: Батбаярын Хаш-Эрдэнэ; born 20 June 1997) is a Mongolian footballer who plays as a forward for Mongolian Premier League club Anduud City and the Mongolian national team.

== Club career ==
Khash-Erdene has played for Mongolian Premier League club Anduud City since 2018, scoring the only goal in the first victory of the season; this was also Anduud City FC's first win under their new name. He was the league's second-highest goalscorer with 13 goals for the 2018 season. His contract was renewed following the season.

== International career ==
Following a camp in June 2018, he made his senior international debut on 16 October 2018 in a friendly against Laos. He was then included in Mongolia's squad for Round 2 of the 2019 EAFF E-1 Football Championship.

In March 2019, Khash-Erdene competed in 2020 AFC U-23 Championship qualification, scoring a goal against Singapore.

=== International career statistics ===
As of match played 16 October 2018

Mongolia national team
Year	Apps	Goals
2018	1	0
Total	1	0
