= 2019 MFF Cup =

Football tournament season in Mongolia

Mongolian Football Federation Cup

Tournament details
- Country: Mongolia

Final positions
- Champions: Erchim
- Runners-up: SP Falcons

The 2019 MFF Cup (2019 Холбооны Цом) is the 12th edition of the MFF Cup, the knockout football tournament in Mongolia.

== Brackets ==
Round of 32
Athletic 220 (Атлетик 220) | 7
Dorno FC (Дорнод Эф Си) | 1
Jipro (Жипро) | 3(5)
Talyn Khokh Arslanguud (Талын Хөх Арслангууд) | 3(4)
Khovd Vyestyern (Ховд Вестерн) | 1
Khaan Khuns Titem (Хаан Хүнс Титэм) | 4
Kharaatsai (Хараацай) | 1
Khoromkhon (Хоромхон) | 7
Ulaanbaatar (Улаанбаатар) | 1
Deren (Дэрэн) | 3
Tov Buganuud (Төв Буганууд) | 5
Darkhan Shiluus (Дархан Шилүүс) | 2
INH (ИНХ) | 0
Sumida (Сумида) | 14
Khokh Chononuud (Хөх Чононууд) | 1
Erchim (Эрчим) | 7
Mongol Temuulel (Монгол Тэмүүлэл) | 12
Shonkhoruud (Шонхорууд) | 1
Ulaanbaatar City (Улаанбаатар Сити) | 14
Khan-Uul (Хан-Уул) | 0
Soyombyn Barsuud (Соёмбын Барсууд) | 16
Oul FC (Оул Эф Си) | 0
Anduud City (Андууд Сити) | 1
Khangarid (Хангарьд) | 3
Khanters (Хантерс) | 2
UB-yn Mazaalainuud (УБ-ын Мазаалайнууд) | 1
KHAD (ХАД) | 0
FC BCH Lions (Би Си Эйч Лионс) | 10
DMIU (ДМЮ) | 1
SP Falcons (СП Фалконс) | 5
Khovd (Ховд) | 5
Khuree Khovguud (Хүрээ Хөвгүүд) | 1

Round of 16
Athletic 220 (Атлетик 220) | 5
Jipro (Жипро) | 0
Khaan Khuns Titem (Хаан Хүнс Титэм) | 3
Khoromkhon (Хоромхон) | 4
Deren (Дэрэн) | 8
Tov Buganuud (Төв Буганууд) | 0
Sumida (Сумида) | 0
Erchim (Эрчим) | 11
Mongol Temuulel (Монгол Тэмүүлэл) | 0
Ulaanbaatar City (Улаанбаатар Сити) | 17
Soyombyn Barsuud (Соёмбын Барсууд) | 0
Khangarid (Хангарьд) | 3
Khanters (Хантерс) | 0
FC BCH Lions (Би Си Эйч Лионс) | 2
SP Falcons (СП Фалконс) | 5
Khovd (Ховд) | 0

Quarter-finals
Athletic 220 (Атлетик 220) | 3 | 8 | 11
Khoromkhon (Хоромхон) | 2 | 0 | 2
Deren (Дэрэн) | 0 | 2 | 2
Erchim (Эрчим) | 3 | 0 | 3
Ulaanbaatar City (Улаанбаатар Сити) | 3 | 2 | 5
Khangarid (Хангарьд) | 5 | 3 | 8
FC BCH Lions (Би Си Эйч Лионс) | 0 | 1 | 1
SP Falcons (СП Фалконс) | 2 | 3 | 5

Semi-finals
Athletic 220 (Атлетик 220) | 0 | 1 | 1
Erchim (Эрчим) | 1 | 1 | 2
Khangarid (Хангарьд) | 1 | 2 | 3
SP Falcons (СП Фалконс) | 1 | 4 | 5

Final
30 October 2019
Erchim (Эрчим) | 3
SP Falcons (СП Фалконс) | 2

== Round of 32 ==
The draw for the round of 32 was held on 17 May 2019.

Matches played between 7 and 20 June 2019.

7 June: Khovd Vyestyern (Ховд Вестерн) 1 - 4 Khaan Khuns Titem (Хаан Хүнс Титэм)

8 June: INH (ИНХ) 0 - 14 Sumida (Сумида)

8 June: Tov Buganuud (Төв Буганууд) 5 - 2 Darkhan Shiluus (Дархан Шилүүс)

8 June: DMIU (ДМЮ) 1 - 5 SP Falcons (СП Фалконс)

9 June: Jipro (Жипро) 3 - 3 (5 - 4 p) Talyn Khokh Arslanguud (Талын Хөх Арслангууд)

9 June: Khanters (Хантерс) 2 - 1 UB-yn Mazaalainuud (УБ-ын Мазаалайнууд)

9 June: KHAD (ХАД) 0 - 10 FC BCH Lions (Би Си Эйч Лионс)

9 June: Mongol Temuulel (Монгол Тэмүүлэл) 12 - 1 Shonkhoruud (Шонхорууд)

10 June: Kharaatsai (Хараацай) 1 - 7 Khoromkhon (Хоромхон)

11 June: Khovd (Ховд) 5 - 1 Khuree Khovguud (Хүрээ Хөвгүүд)

12 June: Soyombyn Barsuud (Соёмбын Барсууд) 16 - 0 Oul FC (Оул Эф Си)

13 June: Khokh Chononuud (Хөх Чононууд) 1 - 7 Erchim (Эрчим)

17 June: Athletic 220 (Атлетик 220) 7-1 Dorno FC (Дорнод Эф Си)

18 June: Ulaanbaatar City (Улаанбаатар Сити) 14-0 Khan-Uul (Хан-Уул)

19 June: Anduud City (Андууд Сити) 1 - 3 Khangarid (Хангарьд)

20 June: Ulaanbaatar (Улаанбаатар) 1 - 3 Deren (Дэрэн)

== Round of 16 ==
The draw for the round of 16 was held on 21 June 2019.

Matches played between 3 and 7 July 2019.

3 July: Soyombyn Barsuud (Соёмбын Барсууд) 0 - 3 Khangarid (Хангарьд)

4 July: SP Falcons (СП Фалконс) 5 - 0 Khovd (Ховд)

5 July: Athletic 220 (Атлетик 220) 5 - 0 Jipro (Жипро)

6 July: Khanters (Хантерс) 0 - 2 FC BCH Lions (Би Си Эйч Лионс)

7 July: Sumida (Сумида) 0 - 11 Erchim (Эрчим)

7 July: Deren (Дэрэн) 8 - 0 Tov Buganuud (Төв Буганууд)

7 July: Khaan Khuns Titem (Хаан Хүнс Титэм) 3 - 4 Khoromkhon (Хоромхон)

7 July: Mongol Temuulel (Монгол Тэмүүлэл) 0 - 17 Ulaanbaatar City (Улаанбаатар Сити)

== Quarter-finals ==
The draw for the quarter-finals onwards were held on 19 July 2019.

The first legs were played between 30 and 31 July 2019, while the second legs were played between 6 and 8 August 2019.

| Team 1 | Agg. | Team 2 | 1st leg | 2nd leg |
|---|---|---|---|---|
| Athletic 220 (Атлетик 220) | 11 - 2 | Khoromkhon (Хоромхон) | 3 - 2 | 8 - 0 |
| Ulaanbaatar City (Улаанбаатар Сити) | 5 - 8 | Khangarid (Хангарьд) | 3 - 5 | 2 - 3 |
| FC BCH Lions (Би Си Эйч Лионс) | 1 - 5 | SP Falcons (СП Фалконс) | 0 - 2 | 1 - 3 |
| Deren (Дэрэн) | 2 - 3 | Erchim (Эрчим) | 0 - 3 | 2 - 0 |

30 July (1st leg): Athletic 220 (Атлетик 220) 3 - 2 Khoromkhon (Хоромхон)

31 July (1st leg): Deren (Дэрэн) 0 - 3 Erchim (Эрчим)

31 July (1st leg): Ulaanbaatar City (Улаанбаатар Сити) 3 - 5 Khangarid (Хангарьд)

31 July (1st leg): FC BCH Lions (Би Си Эйч Лионс) 0 - 2 SP Falcons (СП Фалконс)

6 August (2nd leg): Khangarid (Хангарьд) 3 - 2 Ulaanbaatar City (Улаанбаатар Сити) (agg 8 - 5)

7 August (2nd leg): SP Falcons (СП Фалконс) 3 - 1 FC BCH Lions (Би Си Эйч Лионс) (agg 5 - 1)

7 August (2nd leg): Khoromkhon (Хоромхон) 0 - 8 Athletic 220 (Атлетик 220) (agg 2 - 11)

8 August (2nd leg): Erchim (Эрчим) 0 - 2 Deren (Дэрэн) (agg 3 - 2)

== Semi-finals ==
The first legs were played between 17 and 18 September 2019, while the second legs were played between 24 and 25 September 2019.

| Team 1 | Agg. | Team 2 | 1st leg | 2nd leg |
|---|---|---|---|---|
| Athletic 220 (Атлетик 220) | 1 - 2 | Erchim (Эрчим) | 0 - 1 | 1 - 1 |
| Khangarid (Хангарьд) | 3 - 5 | SP Falcons (СП Фалконс) | 1 - 1 | 2 - 4 |

| 17 September (1st leg) | Athletic 220 FC | 0 - 1 | Erchim FC |

| 18 September (1st leg) | Khangarid FC | 1 - 1 | SP Falcons |

| 24 September (2nd leg) | Erchim FC | 1 - 1 (agg 2-1) | Athletic 220 FC |

| 25 September (2nd leg) | SP Falcons | 4 - 2 (agg 5 - 3) | Khangarid FC |

== Final ==
Match played on 30 October 2019.

| 30 October | Erchim FC | 3 - 2 | SP Falcons |

== See also ==
- 2019 Mongolian Premier League
