= BCH Lions =

Association football club in Mongolia

BCH Lions БИ СИ ЭЙЧ ЛИОНС
- Full name: BCH Lions Football Club
- Nickname: the lions
- Founded: 2018; 8 years ago
- Ground: MFF Football Centre; Ulaanbaatar, Mongolia
- Capacity: 5,000
- Manager: Badarch Chin-Orgil
- League: Mongolian Premier League
- 2022–23: Mongolian Premier League, 10th of 10 (relegated)
- Website: https://www.bchlions.com/?

BCH Lions (Mongolian: БИ СИ ЭЙЧ ЛИОНС) is a Mongolian professional association football club that competes in the Mongolian Premier League. The current manager is Badarch Chin-Orgil.

== History ==
BCH Lions was founded in 2018 as it broke away from Premier League club Selenge Press FC under the guidance of former Selenge Press coach Badarch Chin-Orgil. The following year, the team won the National Amateur Cup.

As a result of its Amateur Cup title, the team competed in the inaugural season of the Mongolia 2nd League later in 2019. The season ended with the club earning the championship and promotion to the Mongolia 1st League in 2020. At the end of the season, BCH Lions players were named the league's best defender (Sasaki Mizuho), goalkeeper (Nakane Hiroki), and midfielder (B. Itgel).

During its first season in the second division, the club earned a third-straight championship and promotion. Lions striker Batkhüyag Munkh-Erdene won the Golden Boot that season with 32 goals and his bicycle kick goal against Khoromkhon earned international attention from Portugal's Desporto ao Minuto.

The club competed in the Mongolian Premier League for the first time in 2021. They avoided relegation in their first season, finishing in 8th position. First-year BCH striker Tetsuaki Misawa won the league Golden Boot award as top goal scorer that season with seventeen goals and five assists in sixteen appearances.

== Domestic history ==
Key

Champion Runners-up 3rd Place

Season	League							Domestic Cup	Notes
Season	Div.	Pos.	Pl.	W	D	L	P	Domestic Cup	Notes
2019	4th	1st	7	6	1	0	19		Promoted to Mongolia 2nd League
2019	3rd	1st	8	6	1	1	19	Quarterfinals	Promoted to Mongolia 1st League
2020	2nd	1st	18	13	3	2	42	Not held	Promoted to Mongolian Premier League
2021	1st	8th	18	5	2	11	17	Not held	
2021/22	1st	10th	18	2	4	12	11	Not held	
2022/23	1st	9th	24	2	1	21	7	3rd Round	Relegated to Mongolia 1st League
2023/24	2nd								
