= Mon-Uran FC =

Association football club in Mongolia

Mon-Uran
- Full name: Football Club Mon-Uran Ulaanbaatar
- Nickname: Ulaanbaatar Mon-Uran
- Founded: 2001
- Ground: MFF Football Centre Ulaanbaatar
- Capacity: 5,000
- League: Mongolian Premier League
- 2003: Runner-up
Home colours	Away colours

Mon-Uran Football Club is a football club from Ulaanbaatar, Mongolia. The club has twice won the Mongolian Cup (2001 and 2002).

== History ==
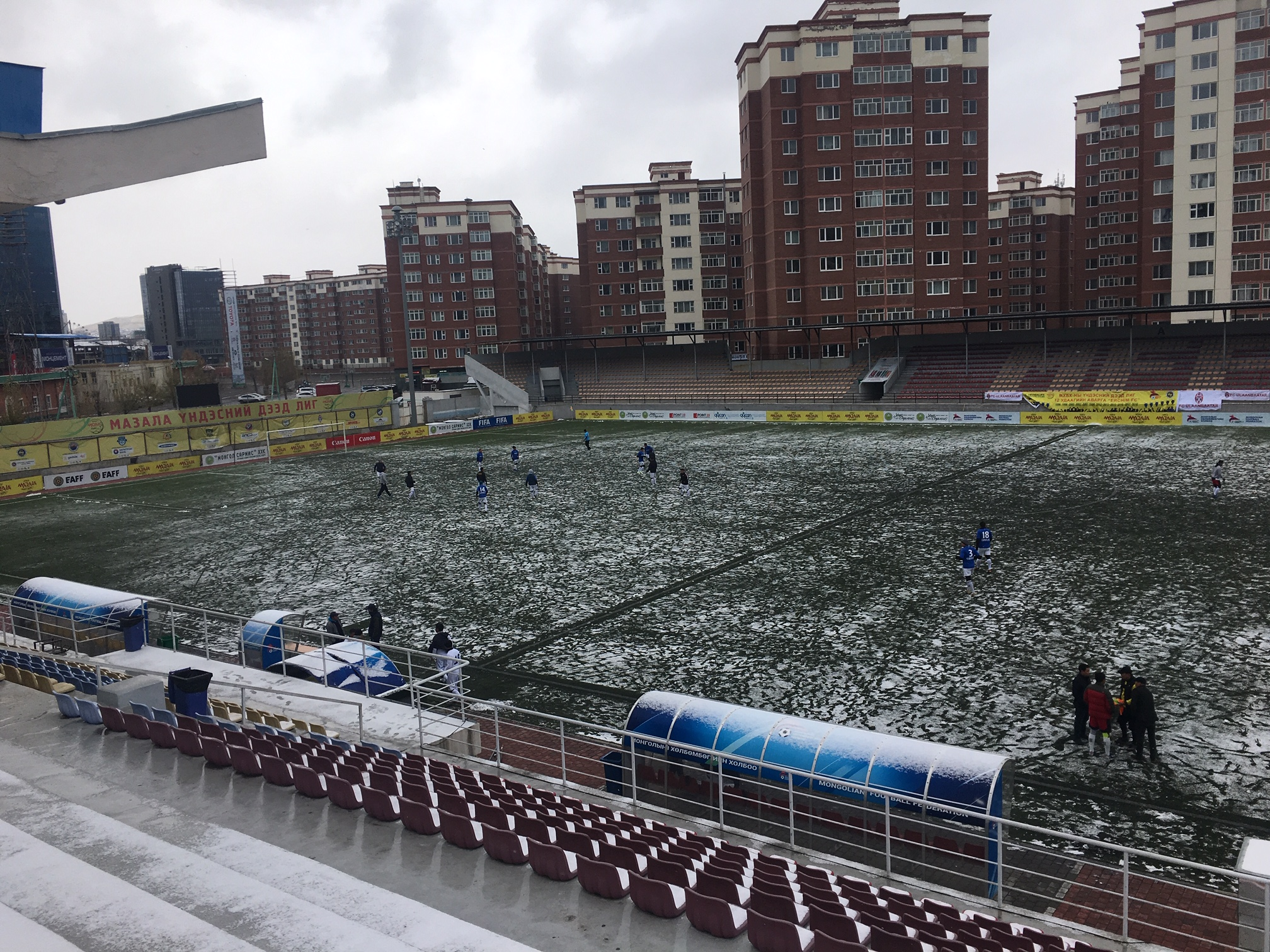
MFF Football Centre Stadium in Ulaanbaatar

In 2001, the club was champion of Mongolian Cup, when it won the Erchim team in the final. That same year the team was runner-up in the League. Just behind the Khangarid team.

In 2002 the club reached the final of Mongolian Cup and against Erchim, the same anniversary of the previous year. Once again the FC Mon-Uran team was champion.

In the MFF League the team finished in third place together with the FC Darchan team.

The team played in the MFF League for the last time in 2003, when they were runners-up in the competition.

== Titles ==
- Mongolian Cup (2001 and 2002)
