= Christian Wolf =

German designer of board games

Christian Wolf is a German designer of board games. He has won the As d'Or for Tutankhamen and the Kinderspiel des Jahres for Klondike in 2001; both were collaborations with Stefanie Rohner. Wolf is an entrepreneur and shareholder & CEO of Anduud City FC in Mongolia.
