= Khaan Khuns Titem FC =

Association football club in Mongolia

Khaan Khuns Titem Хаан Хүнс Титэм
- Full name: Khaan Khuns Titem Football Club
- Nickname(s): Titem FC
- Founded: 2008
- Dissolved: 2020
- Ground: MFF Football Centre; Ulaanbaatar, Mongolia
- Capacity: 5,000
- Owner: Khaan Khuns LLC

Khaan Khuns Titem Football Club (Mongolian: Хаан Хүнс Титэм ХБК) was a football club from the Mongolian capital Ulaanbaatar, which last played in the Mongolian Premier League. The club was established in 2008 and sponsored by Mongolian national food factory Khaan Khuns LLC. It was merged with Erchim FC for the 2020 season.

== History ==
The club was founded in 2008 as Black Morgan. It competed in the inaugural season of the Mongolian 1st League in 2015 as Khangarid City FC. The club finished second that season and earned promotion to the Mongolian Premier League for the 2016 season. However, it sold its Premier League license to the IT Group which used it to place Ulaanbaatar City FC in the league.

== Domestic history ==
Season	League							Domestic Cup	Notes
Season	Div.	Pos.	Pl.	W	D	L	P	Domestic Cup	Notes
2015	2nd	2nd	9	8	0	1	24		Promoted to Mongolian Premier League
2016	2nd	6th	18	8	2	8	26		
2017	2nd	3rd	18	11	4	3	37		
2018	2nd	3rd	10	6	2	2	20		Promoted to Mongolian Premier League
2019	1st	10th	22	2	2	18	8		Relegated to Mongolian 1st League
