= Dornod Aymag FC =

Association football club in Mongolia

Dornod Aymag
- Full name: Dornod Aymag Football Club
- League: Mongolian First League
- 2017: 9th

Dornod Aymag Football Club is a Mongolian football club from Dornod Province, competing in the Mongolia Premier League.
