= Ulaanbaatar City FC =

Association football club in Mongolia

Ulaanbaatar City
- Full name: Ulaanbaatar City Football Club
- Founded: 2016; 10 years ago
- Dissolved: 2023
- Ground: G-Mobile Arena
- Capacity: 5,300
- Owner(s): MT Group, G-Mobile Co. LTD
- President: Dashnyam Ganzorig
- League: Mongolian Premier League
- 2022–23: withdrew
Home colours	Away colours

Ulaanbaatar City Football Club was a professional football club from Ulaanbaatar, Mongolia. They played in the Mongolian Premier League, the highest level of football in Mongolia.

== History ==
The club was founded on 19 March 2016 with club owner, the IT Group, purchasing the Mongolian Premier League license of Khangarid City FC which was subsequently dissolved. The IT Group paid 15 million MNT for the license.

Ulaanbaatar City won the Premier League championship for the first time in 2019, making them eligible to enter the AFC Cup for the first time for the 2020 edition. The team snapped Erchim FC's four-year championship streak in the process. However, the continental tournament was cancelled due to the COVID-19 pandemic before Ulaanbaatar City played its first match.

The club withdrew from the Mongolian Premier League in the 22/23 season as a protest against the Mongolian Football Federation which led to the team to dissolve.

== Stadium ==
Through the 2019 season, Ulaanbaatar City FC shared the MFF Football Centre as a home ground. Ground was broken for the construction of the team's own G-Mobile Arena in late summer of 2017 with an original anticipated completion being in the third quarter of 2018. The stadium will be the fifth venue in the league along with the MFF Centre, Erdenet Stadium, the National Sports Stadium, and Erchim Stadium.

== Domestic history ==
Key

Champion Runners-up 3rd Place

Season	League							Domestic Cup	Notes
Season	Div.	Pos.	Pl.	W	D	L	Pts.	Domestic Cup	Notes
2016	1st	8th	18	6	3	9	21	Semifinals	
2017	1st	2nd	18	12	2	4	38	Champions	
2018	1st	6th	18	7	5	6	26	Runners-up	Super Cup
2019	1st	1st	22	15	3	4	48	Quarter-finals	
2020	1st	7th	18	7	3	8	24	Not held	
2021	1st	6th	18	9	2	7	29	Not held	
2021–22	1st	3rd	18	10	3	5	33	Not held	

== International competition ==
Scores and results list Ulaanbaatar City's goal tally first.

Year	Competition	Round	Club	Home	Away	Aggregate
2020	AFC Cup	Preliminary Round 2	(Chinese Taipei) Taipower	Cancelled		

== Managerial history ==
Name	Nat.	Tenure	Ref.
Rodrigo Hernando	Spain	July–October 2016	
Manuel Retamero Fraile	Spain	July 2017 – June 2018	
Steve Nicholls	England	June–October 2018	
Donorovyn Lümbengarav	Mongolia	April 2019 – January 2020	
Vojislav Bralušić	Serbia	January–October 2020	
