= Rodrigo Hernando =

Spanish football manager

Personal information
- Full name: Rodrigo Hernando González
- Date of birth: 16 January 1982 (age 44)
- Place of birth: Burgos, Spain

Managerial career
- Years: Team
- 2009–2013: Málaga (youth)
- 2016: Ulaanbaatar City
- 2016–2017: Estoril (assistant)
- 2017: SJK (assistant)
- 2017–2018: Peña Sport
- 2018–2019: Izarra
- 2021–2022: Racing Rioja
- 2022: Naft Masjed Soleyman (assistant)
- 2023: Izarra
- 2024–2025: Izarra

Rodrigo Hernando González (born 16 January 1982) is a Spanish football manager.

He managed only in the lower divisions of his country, including three spells with Izarra. He was also head coach of Ulaanbaatar City of the Mongolian Premier League in 2016 and had spells as an assistant in the top divisions of Portugal, Finland and Iran.

== Early life and education ==
Hernando was born in Burgos, Castile and León and raised in Málaga in Andalusia. Though his family were not interested in football and he did not play the game, he wanted to be a manager from the age of 6. He qualified as a physical education teacher, graduated with a master's degree from the Facultad de Ciencias de la Actividad Física y del Deporte (Polytechnic University of Madrid) and holds a UEFA Pro Licence.

As of 2023, Hernando was living in Azagra, Navarre, with his wife and two young children.

== Career ==
=== Early career and Mongolia ===
From 2009 to 2013, Hernando was a coach in local Málaga CF's youth academy, in the early years of Sheikh Al-Thani's ownership of the club. He then moved to Dubai to work in the football school set up by former Real Madrid player Michel Salgado. In 2016, he became the first manager of Ulaanbaatar City FC in the Mongolian Premier League; he was the first Spanish manager in the country. The club's owner Dashnyam Ganzorig was a fan of Real Madrid and demanded a manager of that nationality, who was found through a Spanish agency specialising in East Asia.

=== Assistant jobs and return to Spain ===
In December 2016, Hernando returned to the Iberian Peninsula as assistant manager to compatriot Pedro Gómez Carmona at G.D. Estoril-Praia in the Portuguese Primeira Liga. The pair and another Spanish assistant were sacked in March 2017. After several weeks as an assistant with Seinäjoen Jalkapallokerho in the Finnish Veikkausliiga he was given his first head coach job in Spain in October 2017, at Peña Sport FC. The Segunda División B club had lost all 11 of their games that season before his appointment, while he took 11 points from his first possible 15; the campaign ended in relegation.

In 2018–19, Hernando managed CD Izarra in the same division. He was sacked in March with the team at risk of relegation and having won twice in 14 home games. In the new fourth-tier Segunda Federación, he led Racing Rioja CF until being fired in January 2022 while in third place; his team were unbeaten until the previous November.

=== Iran ===
Hernando went back to Asia and assistant managership in 2022, at Naft Masjed Soleyman F.C. in the Persian Gulf Pro League. In December, new owners appointed new coaching staff, and Hernando reached an agreement for his contract to be terminated as he shared no common language with his new colleagues. He owed taxes for his employment but had never been officially registered to pay taxes, due to being dismissed during his visa application. From 21 December until 9 January 2023 he was unable to leave the country. His service in Iran coincided with the Mahsa Amini protests; Hernando, who was living alone, took advice to avoid demonstrations and concentrate on football.

=== Return to Izarra ===
In March 2023, Hernando returned to Izarra in the Segunda Federación, replacing the sacked Álex Huerta. Three months later, having steered the club from relegation, he decided against remaining there.

Hernando's third spell at Izarra began in March 2024, as the third manager of a season that had seen the club place three points above the relegation play-off. They eventually had to take part in that play-off, retaining their place in the league by beating SD Formentera 1–0 both home and away. His contract was then renewed for another year.

Izarra finished the 2024–25 Segunda Federación with relegation in last place, ending the season on 4 May with a 5–1 home loss to CD Subiza, the team directly above them. Hernando was not retained for the following season.
