= Yuta Mishima =

Japanese footballer

Yuta Mishima 三島 勇太
Personal information
- Full name: 三島 勇太 (Mishima Yūta)
- Date of birth: 10 May 1994 (age 32)
- Place of birth: Kitakyushu, Fukuoka, Japan
- Height: 1.68 m (5 ft 6 in)
- Position: Midfielder

Team information
- Current team: Paro
- Number: 22

Youth career
- –2012: Avispa Fukuoka

Senior career*
Years	Team	Apps	(Gls)
2013–2017	Avispa Fukuoka	75	(2)
2018–2021	Tegevajaro Miyazaki	61	(8)
2022	Khaan Khuns-Erchim	16	(26)
2022–2023	Angthong	17	(2)
2023–2024	Khaan Khuns-Erchim		
2024–2025	Khangarid		
2026	Paro		
- * Club domestic league appearances and goals

Yuta Mishima (三島 勇太, Mishima Yuta; born 10 May 1994) is a Japanese professional footballer who plays as midfielder.

== Career statistics ==
Updated 23 February 2017

Appearances and goals by club, season and competition
Club	Season	League			Emperor's Cup		Other		Total	
Club	Season	Division	Apps	Goals	Apps	Goals	Apps	Goals	Apps	Goals
Avispa Fukuoka	2013	J2 League	27	2	1	0	—		28	2
Avispa Fukuoka	2014	J2 League	30	0	0	0	—		30	0
Avispa Fukuoka	2015	J2 League	9	0	2	0	—		11	0
Avispa Fukuoka	2016	J1 League	9	0	2	1	3	1	14	2
Avispa Fukuoka	2017	J2 League	0	0	2	1	—		2	1
Career total			75	2	7	2	3	1	85	5

== Honours ==
=== Individual ===
- Mongolian National Premier League: top goalscorer 2021–22
