= Mönkh-Erdene Enkhtaivan =

Mongolian footballer (born 1995)

Personal information
- Full name: Enkhtaivangiin Mönkh-Erdene; Энхтайвангийн Мөнх-Эрдэнэ
- Date of birth: 17 October 1995 (age 31)
- Place of birth: Mongolia
- Height: 1.86 m (6 ft 1 in)
- Position: Goalkeeper

Team information
- Current team: FC Ulaanbaatar
- Number: 1

Senior career*
Years	Team	Apps	(Gls)
2017–2022	Athletic 220	88	(0)
2022–	FC Ulaanbaatar	43	(0)

International career^{‡}
2017–	Mongolia	23	(0)
- * Club domestic league appearances and goals ‡ National team caps and goals as of 10 September 2024

Munkh-Erdene Enkhtaivan (Mongolian: Энхтайван овогтой Мөнх-Эрдэнэ; born 17 October 1995) is a Mongolian professional association footballer who plays as a goalkeeper for Mongolian Premier League club FC Ulaanbaatar, and the Mongolian national team. He made his first appearance for the Mongolia national football team in 2017.

== Club career ==
He started his career with Athletic 220. While playing for them he was named the best goal keeper in the 2017, 2018 and 2021 league best XIs, and has played in the AFC Cup for them in 2021, and was listed by AFC as their key player in that season's competition as they played in group J. He played in the 2022 edition as well, but Athletic 220 were defeated by Lee Man of Hong Kong and failed to make the group stage. After Athletic 220 withdrew from the Mongolian premier league, he signed for FC Ulaanbaatar in summer 2022 for an undisclosed fee.
