= Tetsuaki Misawa =

Japanese footballer

Personal information
- Date of birth: 28 January 1999 (age 27)
- Place of birth: Saitama, Japan
- Height: 1.80 m (5 ft 11 in)
- Position: Striker

Team information
- Current team: Royal Cambodian Armed Forces
- Number: 8

Youth career
- 2014–2016: Setouchi High School

College career
Years	Team	Apps	(Gls)
2017–2020	Kanagawa University		

Senior career*
Years	Team	Apps	(Gls)
2021	BCH Lions	16	(17)
2021–2022	Muktijoddha Sangsad	21	(5)
2022	Sudeva Delhi	7	(1)
2023–2025	Tiffy Army	51	(20)
2025–2026	Central Stallions		
2026–	Royal Cambodian Armed Forces	6	(0)
- * Club domestic league appearances and goals as of 13:24, 2 November 2026 (UTC)

Tetsuaki Misawa (born 28 January 1999) is a Japanese professional footballer who currently plays for Royal Cambodian Armed Forces.

== Club career ==
=== Youth career ===
Until 2021, Misawa played for the Kanagawa University team in the 2nd Division of the Kantō Soccer League.

=== BCH Lions ===
Prior to the 2021 season, Misawa signed his first professional contract with BCH Lions of the Mongolian Premier League. He ultimately spent one season with the club, tallying five assists and seventeen goals in sixteen matches to win the league Golden Boot Award as top scorer. Misawa left the club at the end of 2021 in pursuit of opportunities in other countries with an interest in playing in Bangladesh, Cambodia, and Singapore.

=== Muktijoddha Sangsad ===
By November 2021, Misawa had signed for Muktijoddha Sangsad of the Bangladesh Premier League. He quickly made an impact, scoring a goal against Mohammedan SC and two more against Saif Sporting Club in the 2021 Independence Cup. On 25 February 2022, he scored the game-winning goal as Muktijoddha Sangsad earned its first victory of the 2021–22 Bangladesh Premier League season.

=== Sudeva Delhi ===
Misawa signed for Sudeva Delhi of India's I-League for the 2022–23 campaign. He scored his first league goal for the club on 26 November 2022 in a defeat to Rajasthan United.

=== Tiffy Army ===
In June 2023 it was announced that Misawa had signed for Tiffy Army of the Cambodian Premier League for the 2023–24 season.

=== Central Stallions ===
After two seasons in Cambodia in which he scored twenty goals in fifty-one matches, Misawa returned to Mongolia by signing for Central Stallions for the 2025–26 season.

== Honours ==
=== Individual ===
- Mongolian National Premier League Top Goalscorer: 2021
