= APU Company =

Food and drink company of Mongolia

Coordinates: 47.898856°N 106.902548°E

APU JSC
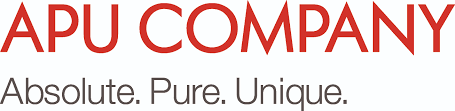

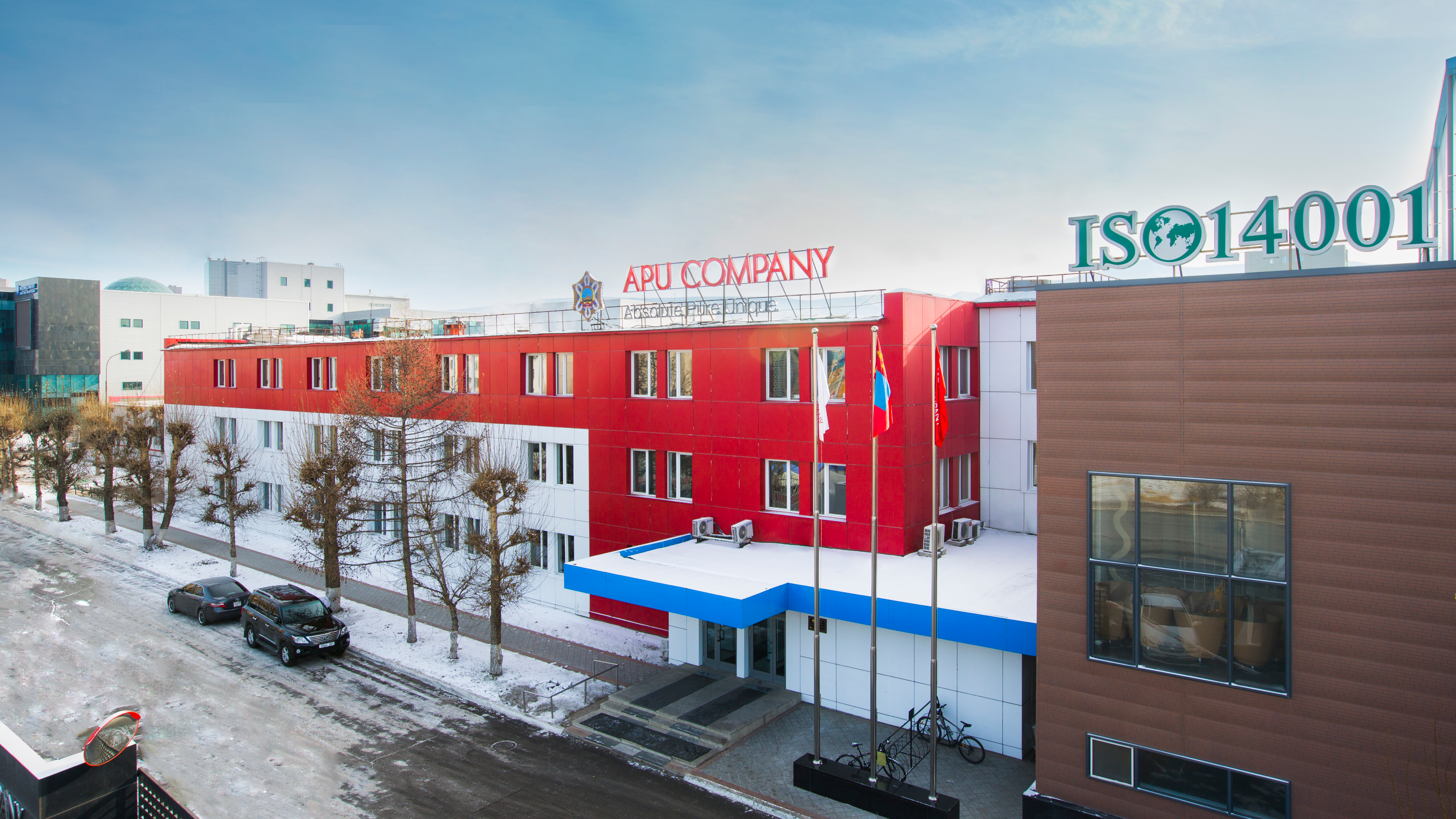
- Type: Public
- Traded as: MSE: APU
- Industry: Beverages
- Founded: 1924
- Headquarters: Ulaanbaatar, Mongolia
- Area served: Mongolia
- Key people: Batsaikhan Purev /Chairman of the Board/, Erdenebileg Tseveenjav /CEO/
- Products: Dairy, Soft Drinks, Vodka, Beer, Wine, Imported products
- Revenue: $106.7 million (2021)
- Number of employees: 2,025 (2021)
- Website: www.apu.mn

APU (Mongolian: АПУ Компани, marketed as "Absolute, Pure, Unique" and originally "Архи Пиво Ундаа" (lit. 'vodka, beer, drinks')) is Mongolia's oldest company and the country’s largest brewer and beverage manufacturer known for producing 'Chinggis Khan', 'Soyombo' and 'Eden" brand vodkas.

APU's brand portfolio has now 35 brands of dairy and soft drinks products and alcoholic beverages for all segments of the local market.

Its products are sold in markets such as China, Hong Kong, South Korea, Russia, Europe, and the United States.

== History ==
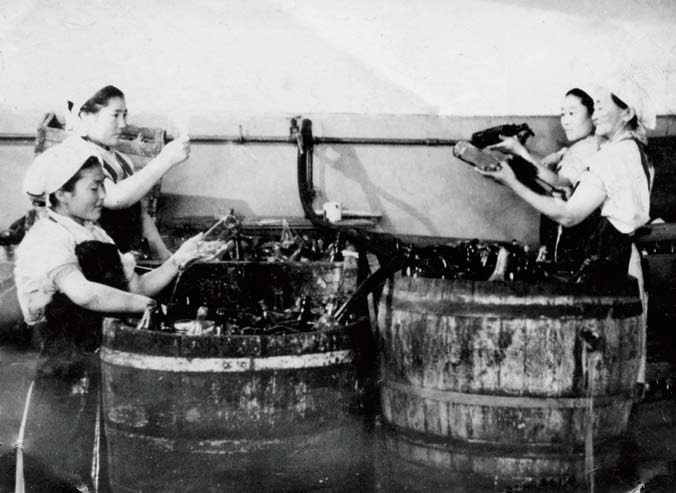
Mongolia's first brewery began its production in 1927 with the assistance of Czech experts.

Mongolian first vodka distillery opened in 1924 in Ulaanbaatar, Mongolia with 14 staff members after the regulation ‘The State Treasury is approved to oversee exclusive right of alcohol production' was approved. Later in 1927, with the assistance of Czech experts, the first national brewery began its production with Borgio brand beer.

With the start of free market economy in 1992, the former state-owned company became the first of the many Mongolian industrial entities to be privatized and publicly listed on the Mongolian Stock Exchange (MSE: APU). A full privatization came in 2001, enabling a significant amount of manufacturing modernization and a steady increase of production capacities. The company began introducing premium vodka and mainstream beverages including beers, carbonated drinks, and bottled waters.

In 2014, a dairy production facility was established, thereafter APU Dairy LLC was founded on September 22, 2017.

In the two decades since privatization, the company achieved 2 trillion MNT market cap with over 12,000 shareholders as of the Q4 of 2021.

== Operations ==
APU Joint-stock company has three local subsidiaries: APU Trading LLC the exclusive distributor of products, Depod LLC the bottle recycling arm and Nature Agro LLC the spirits division.

=== Production operations ===
All production facilities for the company are located in the capital city of Ulaanbaatar:

- A Brewery (modernized 2003)
- A vodka plant (modernized 2004)
- A water and soft drinks plant (modernized 2004)
- A milk, fruit juice and Tetra Pak packaging plant (opened 2006)
- A spirits distillery run by the Nature Agro LLC division (opened 2008)
- APU Dairy LLC, a dairy production facility (opened 2014)

== Ownership ==
In November 2001, APU JSC fully transferred to private ownership by selling 51% of the state-owned company stock through MSE. The shares of APU JSC are traded on the MSE under the symbols: APU. As at 1 January 2022, the shareholding in the group's stock was as depicted in the table below:

APU JSC stock ownership
Rank	Name of Owner	% Ownership
1	Shunkhlai Holding LLC	56.03%
2	Heineken Asia Pacific Pte. Ltd.	25.00%
3	Steppe Beverage KFT	13.45%
	Total	94.48%

In 2017, APU JSC’s stock issuance reached 321,304,553 regular shares, allowing Heineken Asia Pacific Pte. Ltd. to own 25.00% of the total shares.
