= DMU FC =

Association football club in Mongolia

DMU
- Full name: Döchin Myangat United Football Club
- Founded: 2010
- League: Mongolia First League

Döchin Myangat United Football Club or simply DMU is a Mongolian football club, competing in the Mongolia First League.
