= Sumida-Gepro FC =

Association football club in Mongolia

Sumida-Gepro Жипро
- Full name: Football Club Sumida-Gepro
- Founded: 2013; 12 years ago
- Ground: MFF Football Centre
- Capacity: 5,000
- League: Mongolian Premier League
- 2020: Mongolian Premier League, 10th of 10 (relegated)

Sumida-Gepro Football Club (Mongolian: Жипро FC) is a professional football club from the Mongolian capital Ulaanbaatar, currently playing in the Mongolian Premier League. The club was established in 2013 and was promoted to the Mongolian Premier League for the first time after becoming runners-up for the Mongolian First League in 2017.

== Domestic history ==
Season	League							Domestic Cup	Notes
Season	Div.	Pos.	Pl.	W	D	L	P	Domestic Cup	Notes
2016	2nd	8th	18	4	0	14	12		
2017	2nd	2nd	18	12	1	5	37		Promoted to Mongolian Premier League
2018	1st	10th	18	0	1	17	1		Relegated to Mongolian 1st League
2019	2nd	1st	18	12	3	3	39		Promoted to Mongolian Premier League
2020	1st								

== Squad ==
Note: Flags indicate national team as defined under FIFA eligibility rules; some limited exceptions apply. Players may hold more than one non-FIFA nationality. Squad correct as of 23 April 2021.

No.	Pos.	Nation	Player
1	GK	(Mongolia) MNG	Batbayar Batsuurii
2	DF	(Mongolia) MNG	Togtokh Odsaikhan
3	DF	(Mongolia) MNG	Olgin Sukhbaatar
4	FW	(Mongolia) MNG	Jalgar Ganbold
5	MF	(Mongolia) MNG	Orgil Erdene
6	FW	(Mongolia) MNG	Bilguun Purevdorj
7	MF	(Japan) JPN	Hiro Katsumi
8	DF	(Mongolia) MNG	Purevdorj Batbaatar
9	MF	(Mongolia) MNG	Munkh Ganbold-Erdene
10	MF	(Mongolia) MNG	Saibatgan Monkhbold
12	FW	(Mongolia) MNG	Dorjbold Khan
13	FW	(Russia) RUS	Armanov Stritkov
14	DF	(Russia) RUS	Andrey Khabatorvski
15	MF	(Mongolia) MNG	Amarbold Batsaikhan
21	GK	(Mongolia) MNG	Chuluun Bilguun
