= G-Mobile Arena =

Stadium in Khan Uul, Ulaanbaatar, Mongolia

- Interactive map of G-Mobile Arena
- Location: Khan Uul, Ulaanbaatar, Mongolia
- Coordinates: 47.8013°N 106.7449°E
- Owner: Ulaanbaatar City FC
- Capacity: 3,000
- Surface: Artificial turf

Construction
- Groundbreaking: 2017
- Opened: April 2019
- General contractor: Fast Road LLC
- Main contractor: HBS LLC

Tenant
- Ulaanbaatar City FC

G-Mobile Arena is an association football stadium in Khan Uul District, Ulaanbaatar, Mongolia. It is the home of Ulaanbaatar City FC of the Mongolian Premier League. Naming rights belong to Mongolian wireless communication company G-Mobile. The arena includes stands on all four sides and a half roof. An artificial turf surface was imported from the Netherlands. The president of Ulaanbaatar City FC described the stadium as "European quality."

== History ==
Ground was broken for the 3,000-seat stadium in summer 2017 with the opening taking place in 2019. The stadium is the fourth stadium in the Mongolian Premier League along with the MFF Football Centre, Erdenet Stadium, and Erchim Stadium. The Ulaanbaatar City FC became only the third Mongolian club, following Erchim FC and Khangarid FC, to have its own stadium.
