= Pavel Zakharov (footballer) =

Russian footballer

Personal information
- Full name: Pavel Vladimirovich Zakharov
- Date of birth: 9 March 1994 (age 32)
- Place of birth: Chita, Russia
- Height: 1.76 m (5 ft 9 1/2 in)
- Positions: Winger; forward

Senior career*
Years	Team	Apps	(Gls)
2013–2019	FC Chita	88	(5)
2019	Khangarid	22	(28)
2020–2021	Ulaanbaatar City		
2022	Deren		
- * Club domestic league appearances and goals

Pavel Zakharov (Russian: Павел Владимирович Захаров; born 9 March 1994) is a Russian former football player who played as a forward.

== Club career ==
Zakharov came up through the youth teams of FC Chita. He was promoted to the first team in 2013. He went on to make his fully-professional debut for the club in the Russian Professional Football League East. He also appeared for the team in the Russian Cup. In total he made 88 league appearances, scoring five goals for the club.

In January 2019 he joined Mongolian Premier League club Khangarid FC for the 2019 season. He finished the season second in the top scorer's list with 28 goals in 22 league matches as the team finished third in the table. Prior to Zakharov's contract expiring with Khangarid on 27 October 2019, he was offered a contract by league champions Ulaanbaatar City FC. He officially joined the club on a free Bosman transfer on 28 January 2020 ahead of the team's opening fixture of 2020 AFC Cup qualification.

In the winter 2021/2022 transfer window Zakharov signed for Deren FC.
