= Gongorjavyn Davaa-Ochir =

Mongolian footballer

Personal information
- Full name: Gongorjavyn Davaa-Ochir; Гонгоржавын Даваа-Очир
- Date of birth: September 5, 1977 (age 49)
- Place of birth: Mongolia
- Position: Midfielder

Team information
- Current team: Khoromkhon

Senior career*
Years	Team	Apps	(Gls)
2004	Ulaanbaatar United		
2005–	Khoromkhon		

International career
2000–	Mongolia	23	(0)
- * Club domestic league appearances and goals

Gongorjavyn Davaa-Ochir (Mongolian: Гонгоржавын Даваа-Очир; born 5 September 1977) is a Mongolian international footballer. He made his first appearance for the Mongolia national football team in 2000.
