= Donorovyn Lümbengarav =

Mongolian footballer

Lümbengarav Donorovyn
Personal information
- Full name: Lümbengarav Donorovyn
- Date of birth: 27 January 1977 (age 49)
- Place of birth: Mongolia
- Position: Defender

Senior career*
Years	Team	Apps	(Gls)
1998	Delger		
1999–2000	Bayangol		
2001–2003	Ulaanbaatar Mon-Uran	14	
2004–2006	Khoromkhon		
2007	Khangarid		(21)
2007–2008	Erchim		
2009–2015	Ulaanbaataryn Unaganuud		
2016–2019	SP Falcons		

International career
2000–2014	Mongolia	35	(8)
- * Club domestic league appearances and goals

Donorovyn Lümbengarav (Mongolian: Доноровын Лүмбэнгарав; born 27 January 1977) is a Mongolian former footballer who played as a defender. He was a member of the Mongolia national football team, and first represented them in 2000, retiring in 2014. He was the former top scorer until he was surpassed by Nyam-Osor Naranbold in June 2024 and is currently the most capped player for the national team.

== International goals ==
Scores and results list Mongolia's goal tally first.

No.	Date	Venue	Opponent	Score	Result	Competition
1.	24 February 2003	Hong Kong Stadium, Hong Kong	Guam	2–0	2–0	2003 East Asian Football Championship qualification
2.	25 April 2003	Changlimithang Stadium, Thimphu, Bhutan	Guam	5–0	5–0	2004 AFC Asian Cup qualification
3.	28 October 2007	Kim Il-sung Stadium, Pyongyang, North Korea	North Korea	3–1	5–1	2010 FIFA World Cup qualification (AFC)
4.	13 March 2009	Leo Palace Resort Field, Yona, Guam	Macau	2–0	2–1	2010 East Asian Football Championship qualification
5.	15 March 2009	Leo Palace Resort Field, Yona, Guam	Northern Mariana Islands	1–0	4–1	2010 East Asian Football Championship qualification
6.	14 April 2009	MFF Football Centre, Ulan Bator, Mongolia	Macau	3–1	3–1	2010 AFC Challenge Cup qualification
7.	15 March 2011	MFF Football Centre, Ulan Bator, Mongolia	Philippines	1–1	2–1	2012 AFC Challenge Cup qualification
8.	25 July 2014	GFA National Training Center, Guam	Macau	?–?	2–3	2015 East Asian Football Championship qualification
