= Enkhbileg Pürevdorj =

Mongolian footballer

Personal information
- Full name: Pürevdorjiin Enkhbileg; Пүрэвдоржийн Энхбилэг
- Date of birth: 8 February 1996 (age 30)
- Place of birth: Mongolia
- Position: Forward

Team information
- Current team: Anduud City
- Number: 20

Senior career*
Years	Team	Apps	(Gls)
2016–	Anduud City		(15)

International career^{‡}
2017–	Mongolia	13	(1)
- * Club domestic league appearances and goals as of 20:37, 27 March 2018 (UTC) ‡ National team caps and goals as of 20:37, 23 March 2018 (UTC)

Pürevdorjiin Enkhbileg (Mongolian: Пүрэвдоржийн Энхбилэг; born 8 February 1996) is a Mongolian footballer who plays as a forward for Mongolian Premier League club Anduud City and the Mongolian national team.

== Club career ==
Enkhbileg has played for Anduud City of the Mongolian Premier League since 2016. During the club's first season in the top division in 2017, Purevdorj was ranked ninth in the league with seven goals in 18 matches. He was named the Premier League ‘’Forward of the Month’’ for September 2017. He also won the "Goal of the Season" award at the Mongolian Football Federation's annual Golden Ball awards. Purevdorj scored more goals than any other player in the Premier League from outside of the box, with one of those strikes winning the award.

== International career ==
Enkhbileg appeared for Mongolia in 2018 AFC U-23 Championship qualification, including in a match against Malaysia in which he was threatening in the opponents' half. In December 2017 he was again called up to the under-23 team to compete in the 2017 Aceh World Solidarity Tsunami Cup in Indonesia.

He made his senior international debut on 5 October 2017 coming on as a substitute in a 2–4 friendly defeat to Chinese Taipei on 5 October 2017. He scored his first goal for Mongolia in its next match, and just his second cap and first start, in a friendly match away at Malaysia on 22 March 2018.

=== International goals ===
Score and result list Mongolia's goal tally first.

#	Date	Venue	Opponent	Score	Result	Competition
1	22 March 2018	Bukit Jalil National Stadium, Bukit Jalil, Malaysia	Malaysia	1–1	2–2	Friendly
Last updated 22 March 2018

=== International statistics ===
As of match played 27 March 2018

Mongolia
Year	Apps	Goals
2017	1	0
2018	2	1
Total	3	1
