= MFF Cup (Mongolia) =

Association football tournament in Mongolia

- Founded: 1995
- Region: Mongolia
- Current champions: Selenge Press Falcons
- Most championships: Khaan Khuns-Erchim (8 titles)

Mongolia Cup (Mongolian: МХХ-ны Цом) is the top football knockout tournament in Mongolia.

== List of champions ==
- 1996 Erchim (1)
- 1997 Erchim (2)
- 1998 Delger (1)
- 1999 Erchim (3)
- 2000 Erchim (4)
- 2001 Mon-Uran (1)
- 2002 Mon-Uran (2)
- 2005 Khoromkhon (1)
- 2011 Erchim (5)
- 2012 Erchim (6)
- 2014 Darkhan-Uul (1)
- 2015 Erchim (7)
- 2016 Khangarid (1)
- 2017 Ulaanbaatar City (1)
- 2018 Athletic 220 (1)
- 2019 Erchim (8)
- 2022 Tuv Azarganuud (1)
- 2023 Ulaanbaatar (1)
- 2024 Bulgan SP Falcons (1)

== Titles per club ==
Club	Champion	Years won
Khaan Khuns-Erchim (Ulaanbaatar)	8	1996, 1997, 1999, 2000, 2011, 2012, 2015, 2019
Mon-Uran (Ulaanbaatar)	2	2001, 2002
Selenge Press Falcons (Ulaanbaatar)	2	2024, 2025
Delger (Ulaanbaatar)	1	1998
Khoromkhon (Ulaanbaatar)	1	2005
Darkhan-Uul (Darkhan-Uul)	1	2014
Khangarid (Erdenet)	1	2016
Ulaanbaatar City (Ulaanbaatar)	1	2017
Athletic 220 (Ulaanbaatar)	1	2018
Tuv Azarganuud (Töv Province)	1	2022
Ulaanbaatar (Ulaanbaatar)	1	2023

== Borgio Cup ==
- 2007 Khangarid (1)
- 2008 Khasiin Khulguud (1)
- 2009 Ulaanbaataryn Unaganuud (1)
- 2010 Ulaanbaataryn Unaganuud (2)
- 2011 Khaan Khuns-Erchim (1)
- 2012 Khoromkhon (1)
- 2013 Khangarid (2)
- 2014 Khaan Khuns-Erchim (2)

== Titles per club ==
Club	Champion	Years won
Ulaanbaataryn Unaganuud (Ulaanbaatar)	2	2009, 2010
Khangarid (Erdenet)	2	2007, 2013
Khaan Khuns-Erchim (Ulaanbaatar)	2	2011, 2014
Khasiin Khulguud (Ulaanbaatar)	1	2008
Khoromkhon (Ulaanbaatar)	1	2012
