= G-Mobile =

Mongolian telecommunications company

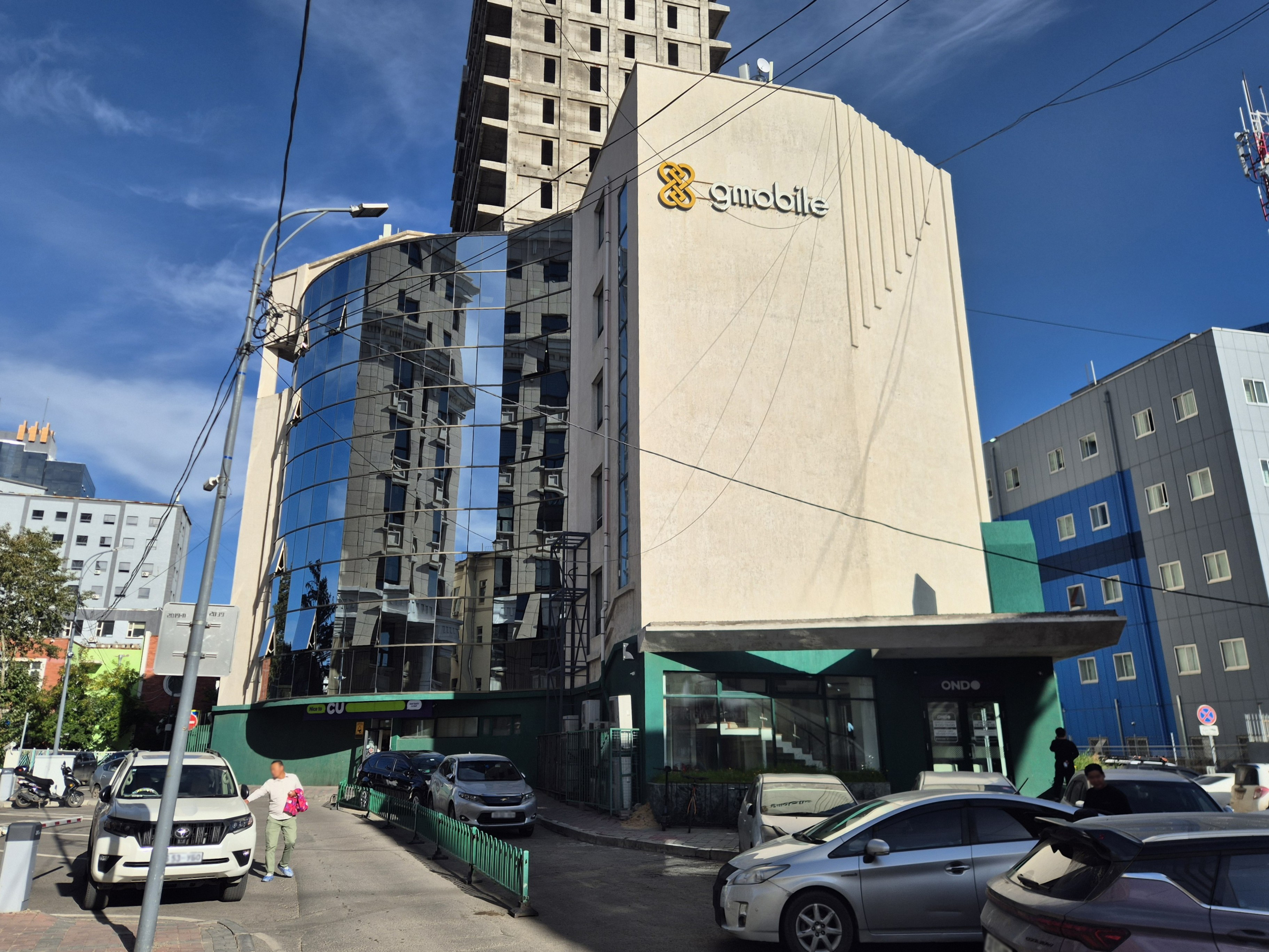
- Founded: 2006
- Headquarters: Ulaanbaatar, Mongolia
- Website: gmobile.mn

G-Mobile LLC (Mongolian: Жимобайл ХХК) is a Mongolian mobile operator. Founded in 2006, it operates in rural areas using CDMA2000 on the 450 MHz frequency and provides internet services with mobile phones used as modems or compatible modems.

The company was first established in April 2006 and has 290 employees. G-Mobile is involved in mobile phone and internet services, and the installation of inter-organizational and inter-departmental telephone networks.

In 2012, WCDMA DC HSPA+ was launched in Ulaanbaatar with the brand name 3.99G, providing wireless mobile internet service. G-Mobile also provided its customers with voice service free of charge and with improved quality.

More than 300 employees work in 21 branches of the corporation located in 21 regions and in the centers of Darkhan, Erdenet, and Ulaanbaatar. Contracted dealers work in cooperation with agricultural and Mongolian postal banks to provide services of G-Mobile Corporation in other slums and other settlements.

== History ==
G-Mobile LLC, the national mobile operator, was established in April 2006 after winning the tender "Improving Rural Communications" announced by the Communications Coordination Committee as part of the Mongolian government's policy. G-Mobile LLC created the infrastructure of its network and installed all equipment within one year. The Corporation inaugurated the opening of the G-Mobile network on April 21, 2007. Up to date, it covered 260 slums and other settlement areas in Mongolia with G-Mobile cell phone services.

In 2008, G-Mobile became the first operator to introduce 3G technology in Mongolia and launched G-Internet phone service, the most extensive mobile Internet service based on 1X, EvDo technology. It introduced the G-10 service, which allows users to talk without restrictions within the network.

In 2009, G-Mobile established the internet service subsidiary G-Mobile Net and the satellite TV service subsidiary D-Dish. Under the auspices and cooperation of ICT EXPO, became one of the top 100 companies in Mongolia, and the G-10 service received the "Most Satisfactory Service" award from ICT EXCPO.

In 2010, it introduced the Switching Option service, which allows prepaid subscribers to switch payment options without switching their numbers.

In 2011, it launched a high-speed Internet network based on EvDo in Soms and launched U-Tab devices with a licensed Android operating system that can be used anywhere on the G-Mobile network. It introduced the Assistive Messaging Service.

In 2012, 3.99G technology, Do Re Mi, Tugs Tuguldur post-paid service was launched. He became an official partner of Samsung.

In 2013, it launched HD Voice technology and Call Storage. It became an official partner of Nokia and Facebook.
