= Erchim Stadium =

Stadium in Ulaanbaatar, Mongolia

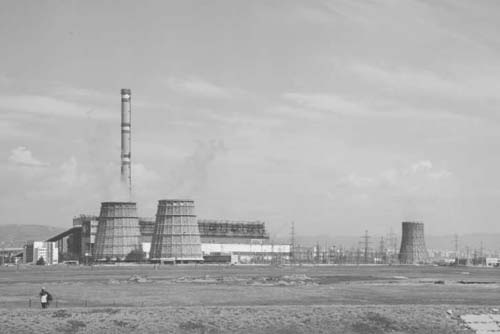
- Power Station #4 before construction of the stadium
- Interactive map of Erchim Stadium
- Full name: Erchim Stadium
- Location: Bayangol, Ulaanbaatar, Mongolia
- Coordinates: 47.8890°N 106.7975°E
- Capacity: 2,000
- Surface: Artificial turf

Tenant
- Erchim FC

Erchim Stadium is an association football stadium in Bayangol District, Ulaanbaatar, Mongolia. It serves as the home stadium of Mongolia's most successful football club, Erchim FC of the Mongolian Premier League. Erchim is typically the only Premier League club to have its own stadium as the league's other clubs play at the MFF Football Centre. The stadium is flanked by the mountains on one side and Thermal Power Plant No. 4, the owners of Erchim FC, on the other. The stadium has a capacity of 2,000 spectators and features an artificial turf playing surface.
