= National Sports Stadium (Mongolia) =

Stadium in Khan Uul, Ulaanbaatar, Mongolia

Coordinates: 47°54′7.7″N 106°54′58.5″E

National Sports Stadium Үндэсний спортын цэнгэлдэх хүрээлэн Ündesnii sportyn tsengeldekh khüreelen
- Central stadium Төв цэнгэлдэх хүрээлэн Töv tsengeldekh khüreelen
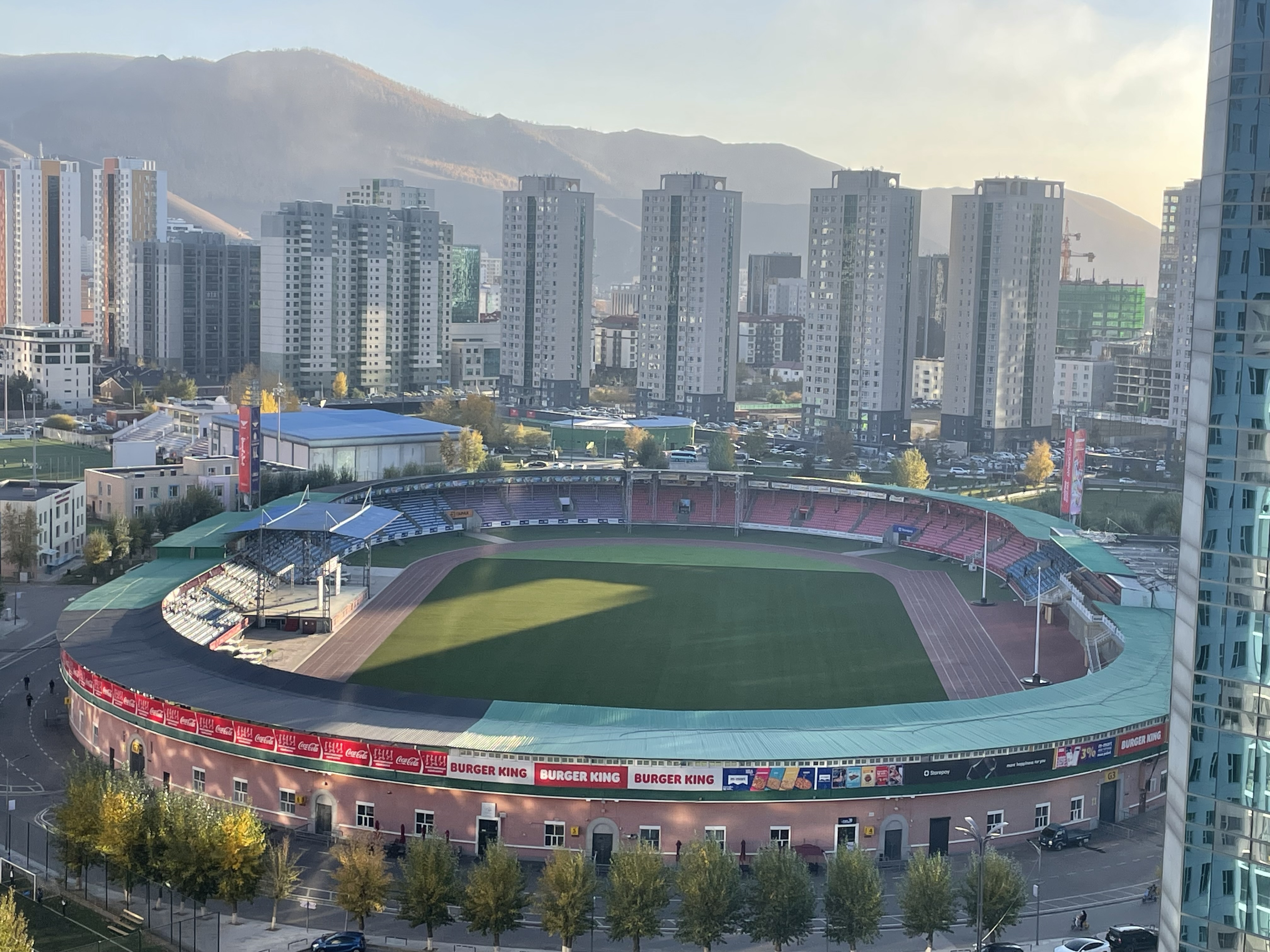
- National Sports Stadium in Mongolia, 2025
- Interactive map of National Sports Stadium; Үндэсний спортын цэнгэлдэх хүрээлэн Ündesnii sportyn tsengeldekh khüreelen
- Location: Khan Uul, Ulaanbaatar, Mongolia
- Owner: Government of Mongolia / private
- Capacity: 12,500 (football)
- Surface: Grass
- Field size: 105 × 68 m

Construction
- Groundbreaking: 1958
- Opened: 1958

Tenant
- Deren FC

National Sports Stadium (In Mongolian: Үндэсний спортын цэнгэлдэх хүрээлэн Ündesnii sportyn tsengeldekh khüreelen) is a multi-purpose stadium in Khan Uul District, Ulaanbaatar, Mongolia. It is used mostly for football matches and has a capacity of 12,500. The Naadam festival, which celebrates Mongolian independence, is held there every July. The land owned by the stadium company is about 27 hectares, of which the stadium takes about 8 hectares of land. The National Sport Stadium in Mongolia hosted the 2016 World University Archery Championship.

== History ==
The stadium was established in 1958 by Russian construction in Ulaanbaatar, Mongolia, using a combination of reinforced concrete and brick mixed design. The Mongolians finished the central roof in 1971.

Since then, it has not been majorly renovated, although it gets a little painting and touch up once a year. Even though the stadium was built for multi-use such as football and festivals, the only mandatory event is the Naadam festival held on July 11 of each year which commemorates Mongolian State Flag Day and the People's Revolution of 1921. In 1996, a military parade in the National Sports Stadium commemorated the 790th anniversary of the Mongol Empire and the 75th anniversary of the People's Revolution. Other events are usually held under a contract except those organized by the government. In 2014, old wooden chairs were removed and replaced with plastic chairs.

In 2024, renovations are made by installation of new drainage lines and sanitary facilities. Improvements to the lighting were also planned.

== Owners ==
In 1993, the stadium was privatized as they didn't generate any profit.

In 2007, T. Nyamdavaa, the 51% of the stadium, submitted false documents claiming that he is the sole owner of the stadium. His claims was dismissed two months later by Supreme Court's Administrative Chamber and the Capital Administrative Court. In 2008, the Supreme Court overturned the decision of the previous courts.

In 2019, it is decided that the 49% ownership of the stadium would be private owned. The city council of Ulaanbaatar decided to sell 49% of the city's ownership of "Central Stadium" LLC in 2020 for 22.56 billion tugrik. During this period, the city continued to spend money to improve the stadium, spending 4.6 billion tugriks for the maintenance and the improvement of the stadium. On the other hand, the city only received 32.7 million tugriks in dividends.

The stadium is part private owned and part government owned, with a 51%/49% split. The reason for its split ownership is that there is only one stadium that can hold 2,500 people in Mongolia. If the stadium was wholly private the government would have to fund the entire Naadam festive, 70% of the costs of which are taken from ticket sales and the leasing of surrounding land.

In 2024, the city took over 100% ownership of the "Central Stadium" LLC.

== Future ==
In 2019, The Cabinet of Ministers of Mongolia have planned a new indoor sports stadium with a capacity of 50-60,000 to somewhat replace the National Sports Stadium.

== Events ==
- Core Contents Media artist, including T-ara, Davichi, SPEED, and The SeeYa held a concert in the stadium on 21 September 2013
- September 12, 2025: T-ara Reverse concert.
