= Erdenet Stadium =

Stadium in Erdenet, Orkhon, Mongolia

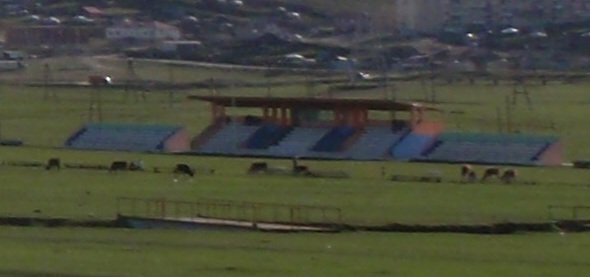
- Stadium in 2009, prior to renovation
- Interactive map of Erdenet Stadium
- Full name: Erdenet Stadium
- Location: Erdenet, Mongolia
- Coordinates: 49.0265°N 104.0489°E
- Capacity: 3,000
- Surface: Artificial turf

Tenant
- Khangarid FC

Erdenet Stadium is an association football stadium in the Erdenet, Orkhon Province, Mongolia. The stadium has a capacity of 3,000 spectators and features an artificial turf playing surface. It is home to Mongolian Premier League club Khangarid FC.

== History ==
The stadium was established in 2006.
