= MFF Football Centre =

Football stadium in Ulaanbaatar, Mongolia

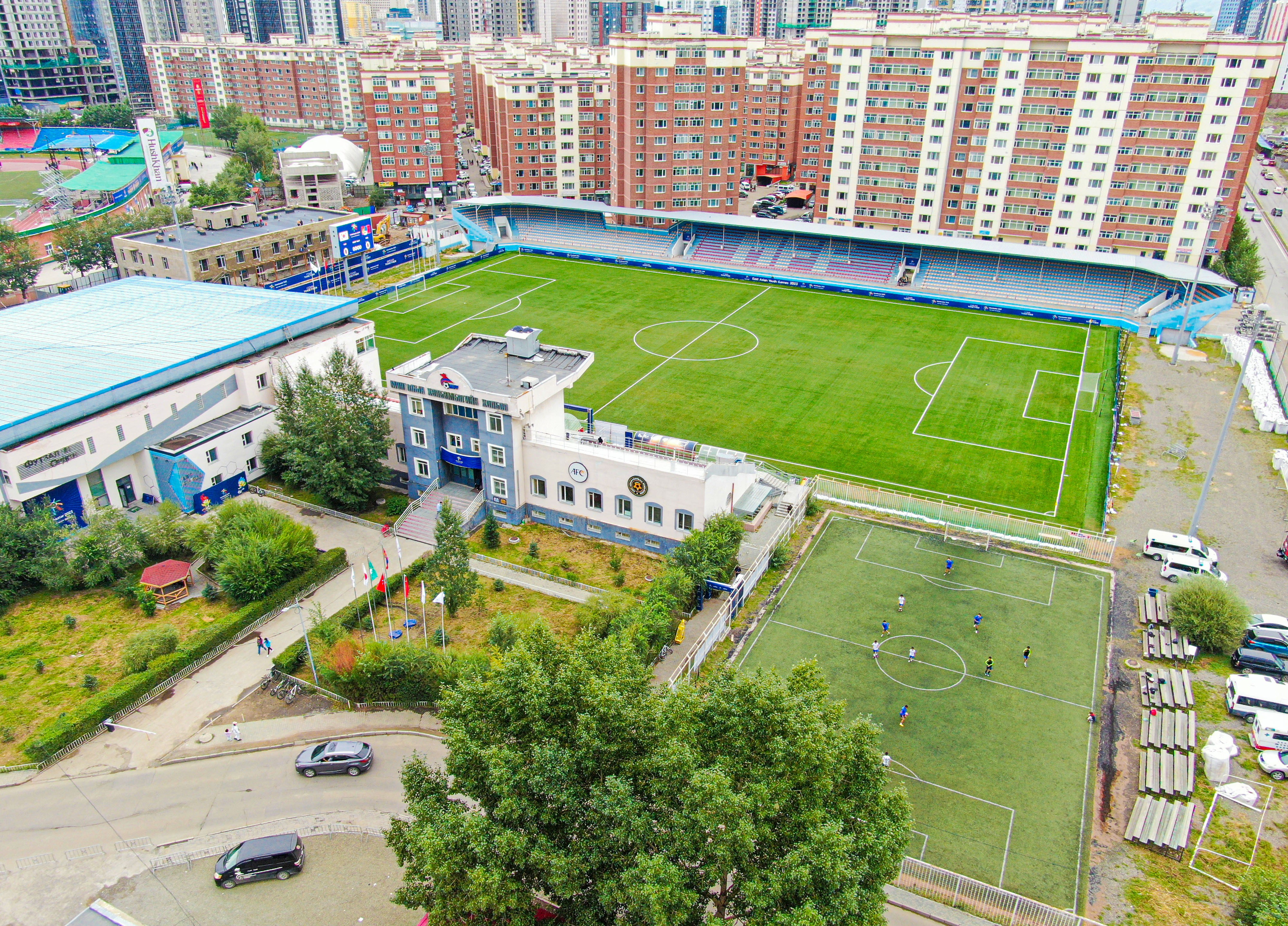
- Interactive map of MFF Football Centre
- Location: Ulaanbaatar, Mongolia
- Coordinates: 47°54′00″N 106°54′58″E
- Operator: Mongolian Football Federation
- Capacity: 5,000
- Surface: Artificial turf
- Field size: 110m x 73m

Construction
- Opened: 24 October 2002

Tenants
- Mongolia national football team various clubs: Mongolian Premier League; Mongolian First League; Mongolian Second League; National Amateur Cup

The MFF Football Centre (Mongolian: Монголын Хөлбөмбөгийн Холбооны Цэнгэлдэх Хүрээлэн) is a stadium in Ulaanbaatar, Mongolia.

== Overview ==
It is used for football matches and has an artificial playing surface.

The newly-expanded 5,000 seat stadium at the football centre opened in October 2013.

It hosted Mongolia's qualification campaigns for the AFC Challenge Cup and the 2014 FIFA World Cup.

In September 2022, the 110m x 73m field was resurfaced using a foam, sand, and cork mixture instead of rubber, a process that was newly-approved by FIFA. The stadium became the first in the country to feature the fully recyclable surface.
