= Ulaanbaatar =

Capital and largest city of Mongolia

Ulaanbaatar Улаанбаатар ᠤᠯᠠᠭᠠᠨᠪᠠᠭᠠᠲᠤᠷ (Note: Transcribed as Ulaɣanbaɣatur. It was pronounced as [ʊlaʁamˈbaʁatʊ̆r] in Middle Mongol. The Mongolian script retains original pronunciation.)
- Capital city
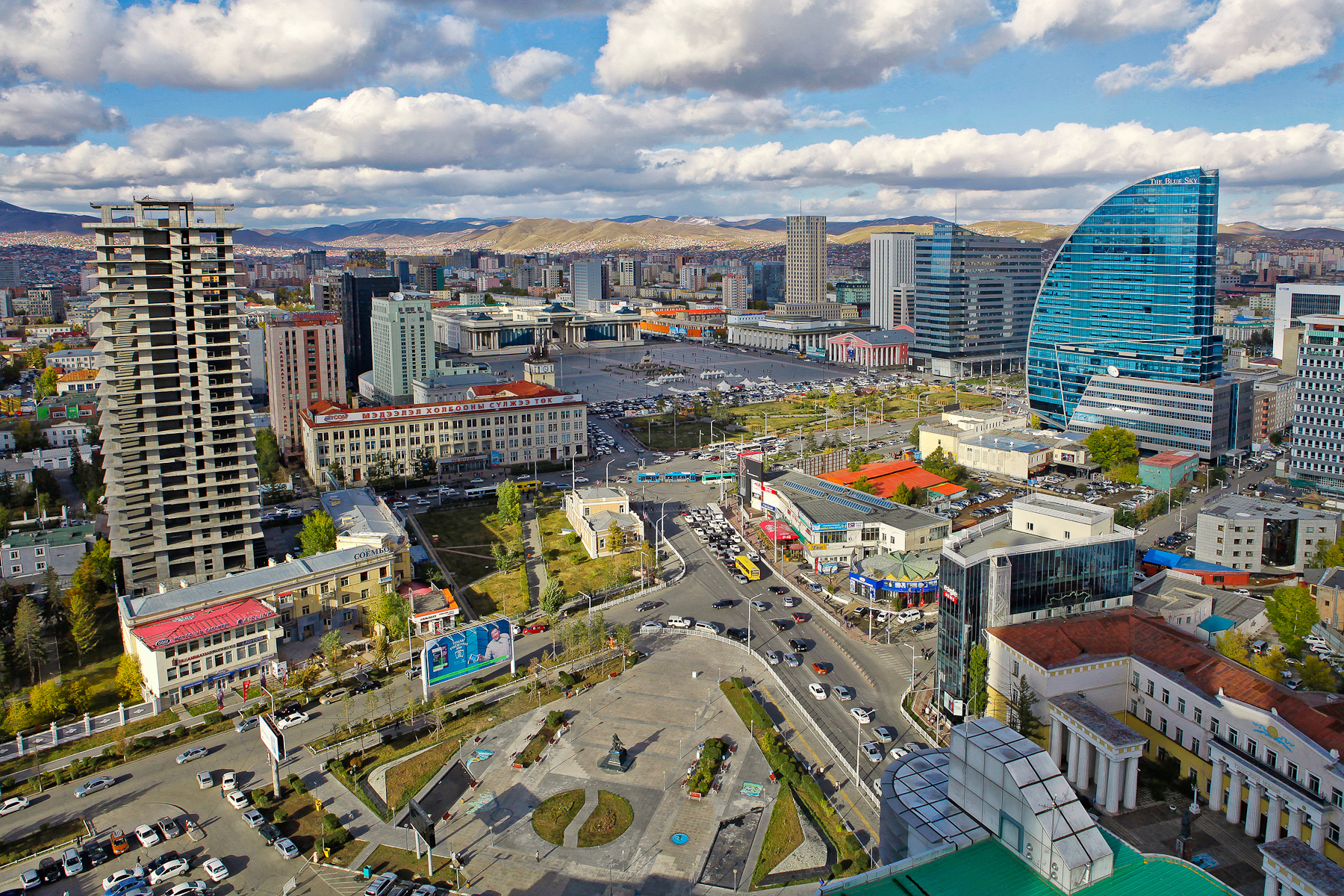
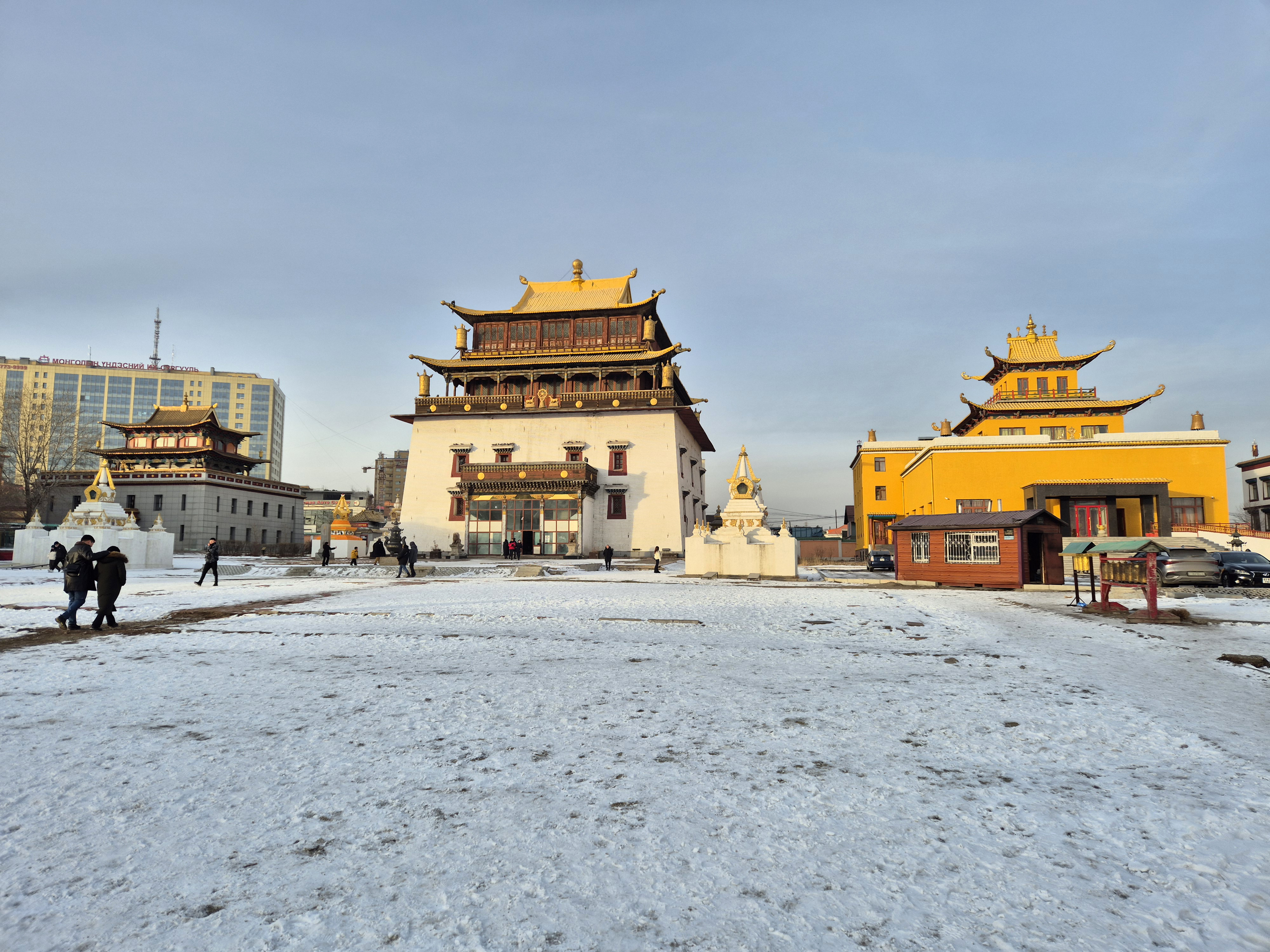
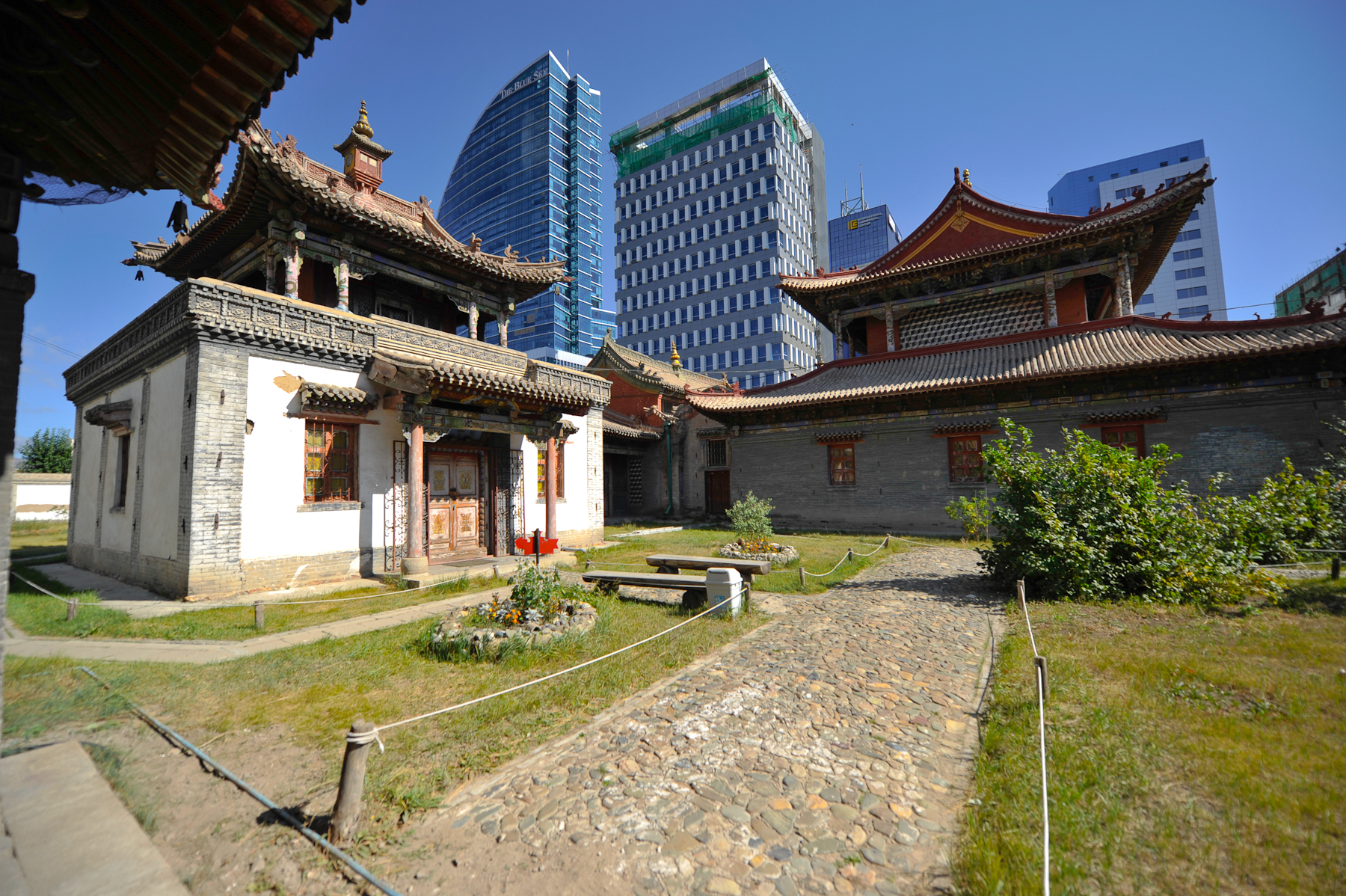
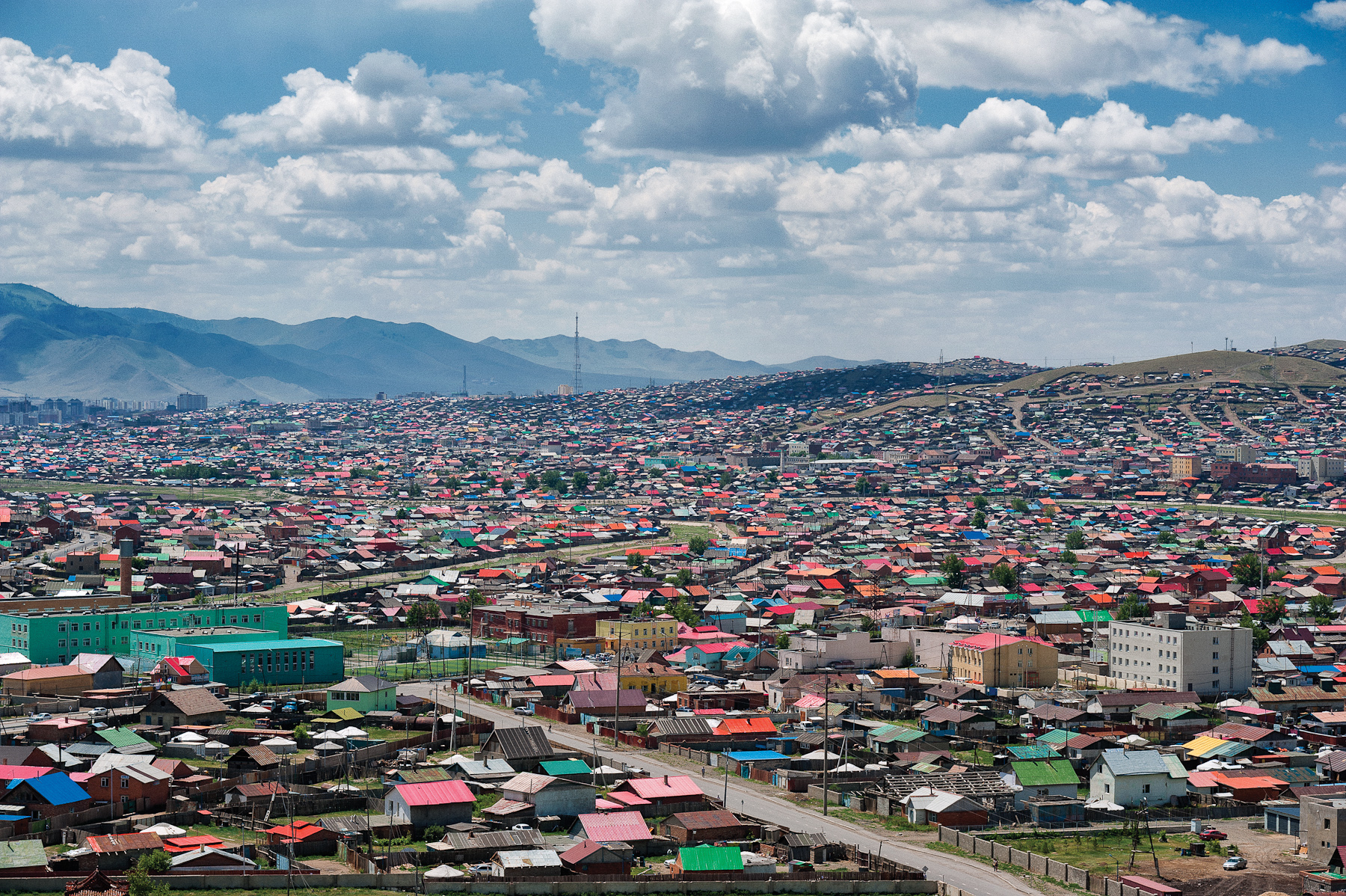
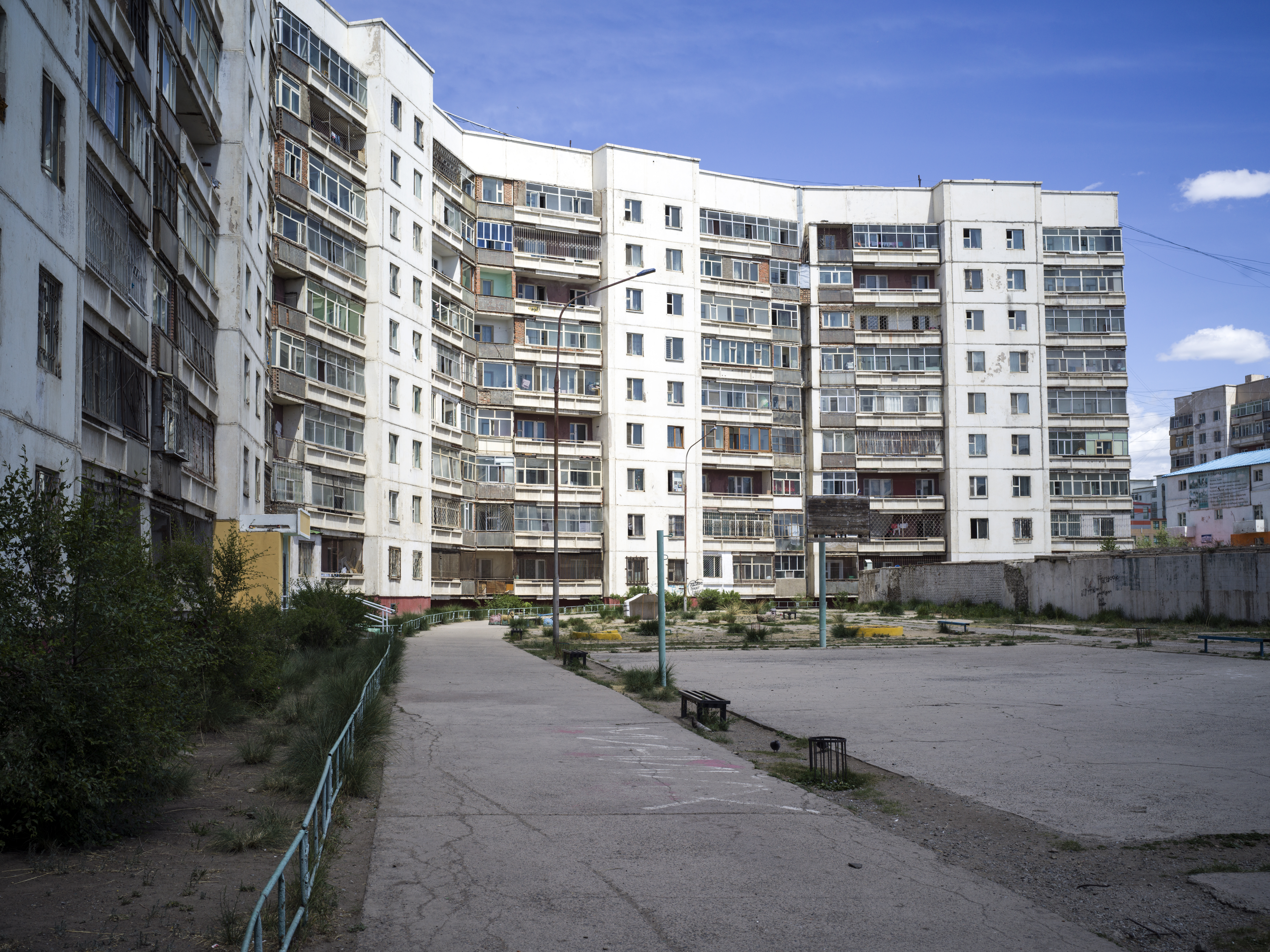
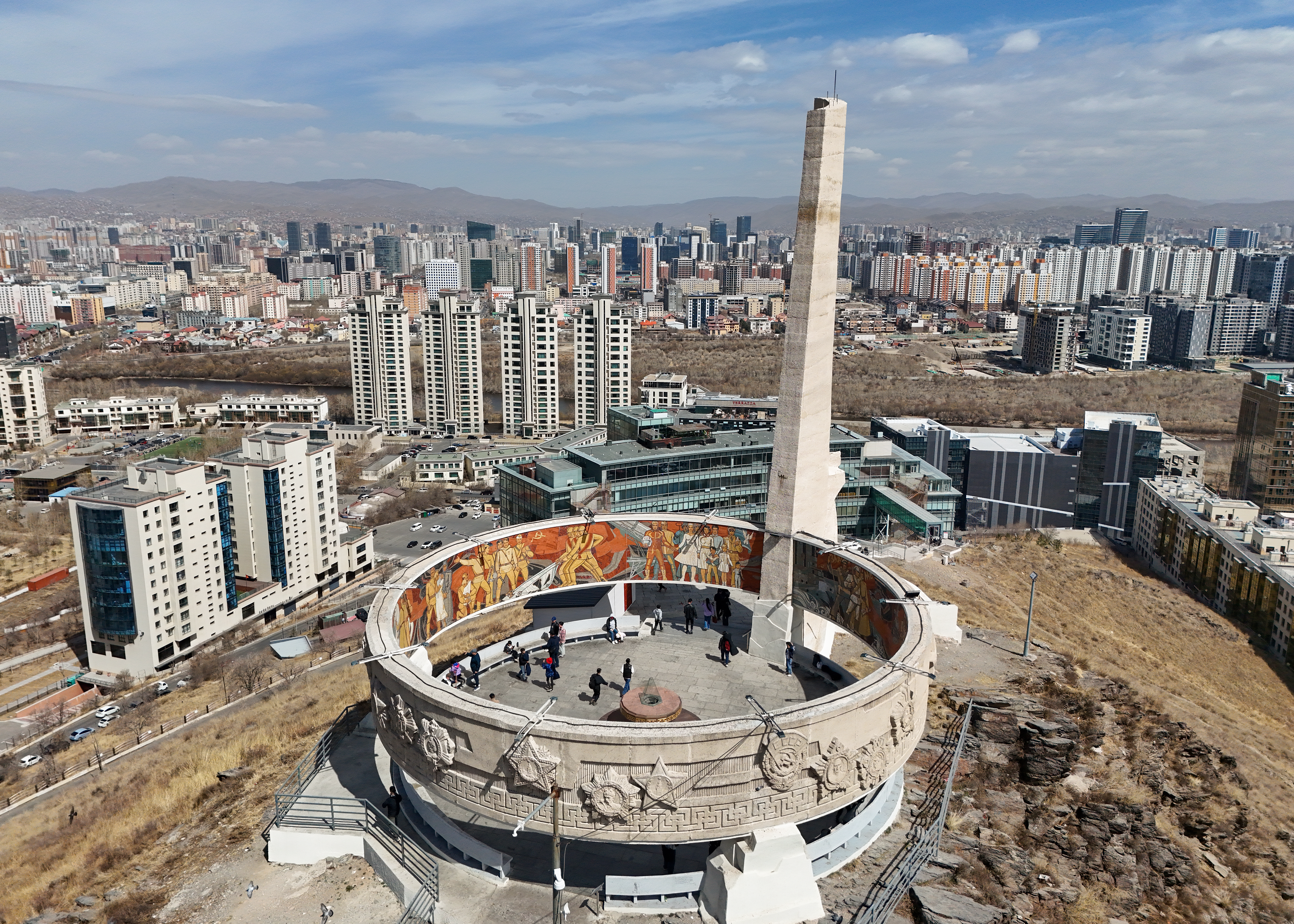
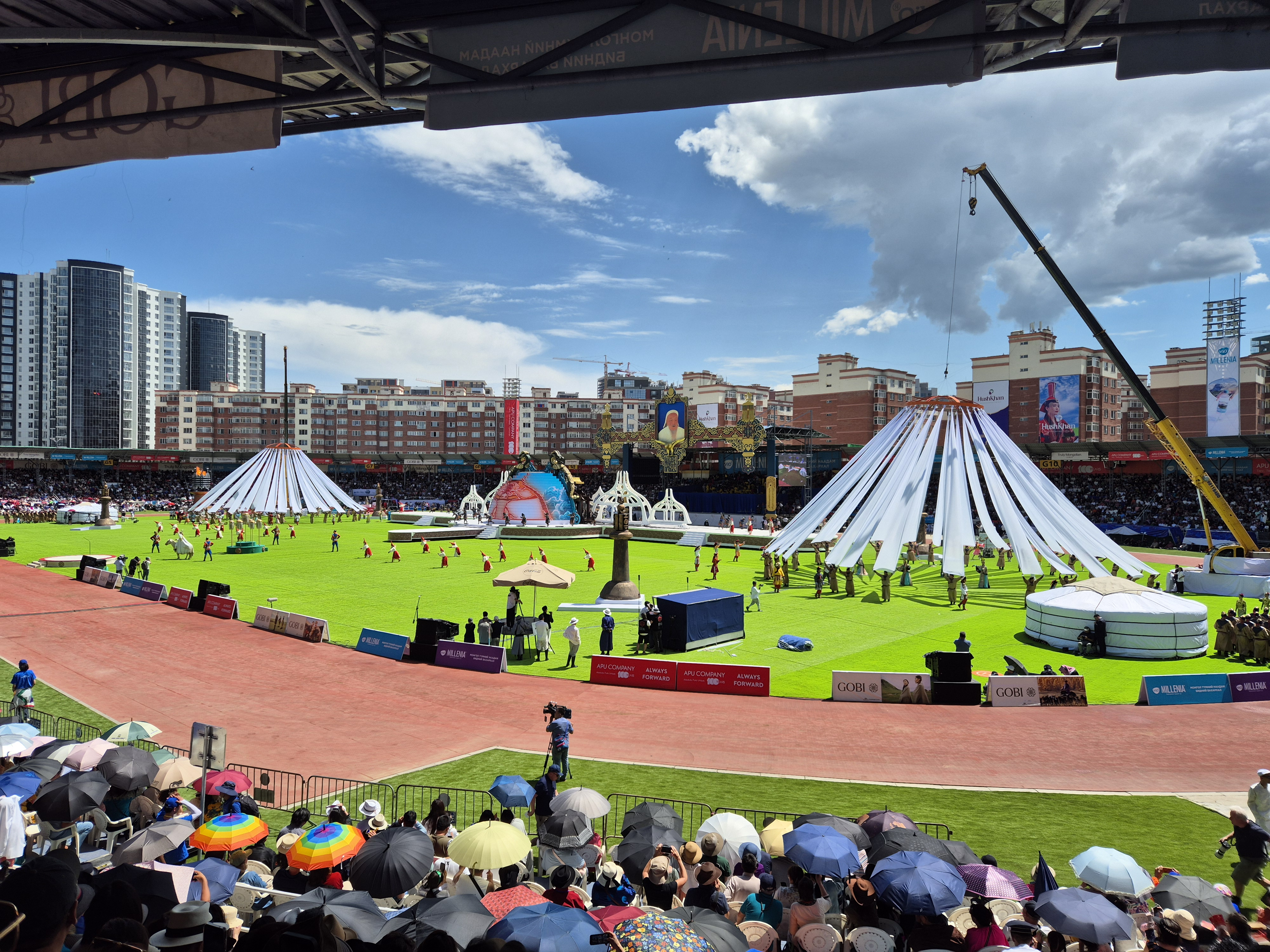
- City centre with Sükhbaatar Square Gandantegchinlen Monastery Choijin Lama Temple Ger districts Ugsarmal panel buildings built in the socialist era Zaisan Memorial Naadam ceremony at the National Sports Stadium

- Flag Coat of arms
- Nicknames: УБ (UB), Нийслэл (capital), Хот (city)
- Ulaanbaatar highlighted in Mongolia

- Location of Ulaanbaatar in Mongolia Ulaanbaatar (Asia)
- Coordinates: 47°55′19″N 106°54′55″E
- Country: Mongolia
- Monastic centre established: 1639
- Final location: 1778
- Named Ulaanbaatar: 1924

Government
  - Type: Council–Manager
  - Body: Citizens' Representatives Khural of the Capital City
  - Governor of the Capital City and Mayor of Ulaanbaatar: Byaruuzanyn Pürevdagva (MPP)

Area
  - Total: 4,704 km^{2} (1,816 sq mi)
- Elevation: 1,350 m (4,430 ft)

Population (2025)
  - Total: 1,796,045
  - Density: 381.8/km^{2} (988.9/sq mi)

GDP
  - Total: ▲MNT 62.846 trillion US$17.5 billion (2025)
  - Per capita: ▲MNT 37,461,000; US$10,435 (2025)
- Time zone: UTC+08:00 (ULAT)
- Postal code: 210 xxx
- Area code: +976 (0)11
- HDI (2023): ▲0.813 – Very high · 1st
- License plate: УБ, УН, УХ, УИ, УР, УА, УЭ
- ISO 3166-2: MN-1
- Climate: BSk
- Website: www.ulaanbaatar.mn

Ulaanbaatar (Note: /ʊˈlɑːn ˈbɑːtər/; Mongolian: Улаанбаатар, Mongolian: ᠤᠯᠠᠭᠠᠨᠪᠠᠭᠠᠲᠤᠷ, romanized: Ulaɣanbaɣatur, pronounced [ʊ.ɮaːŋ.paː.tʰər], lit. 'Red Hero', previously anglicized as Ulan Bator based on the Russian transliteration Улан-Батор) is the capital and largest city of Mongolia. It has a population of 1.79 million, and is the coldest capital city in the world by average yearly temperature. The municipality is located in north central Mongolia at an elevation of about 1,300 metres (4,300 ft) in a valley on the Tuul River. The city was founded in 1639 as a nomadic Buddhist monastic centre, changing location 29 times, and was permanently settled at its modern location in 1778.

During its early years, as Örgöö (anglicized as Urga), it became Mongolia's preeminent religious centre and seat of the Jebtsundamba Khutuktu, the spiritual head of the Gelug lineage of Tibetan Buddhism in Mongolia. Following the regulation of Qing-Russian trade by the Treaty of Kyakhta in 1727, a caravan route between Beijing and Kyakhta opened up, along which the city was eventually settled. With the collapse of the Qing dynasty in 1911, the city was a focal point for independence efforts, leading to the proclamation of the Bogd Khanate in 1911 led by the 8th Jebtsundamba Khutuktu, or Bogd Khan, and again during the communist revolution of 1921. With the proclamation of the Mongolian People's Republic in 1924, the city was officially renamed Ulaanbaatar and declared the country's capital.

Modern urban planning began in the 1950s, with most of the old ger districts replaced by Soviet-style flats. In 1990, Ulaanbaatar was the site of large demonstrations that led to Mongolia's transition to democracy and a market economy. Since 1990, an influx of migrants from the rest of the country has led to an explosive growth in its population, a major portion of whom live in ger districts, which has contributed to harmful air pollution in winter. Excessive coal production and consumption in Ulaanbaatar make it one of the world's most polluted cities, causing the incidence of pneumonia and other respiratory illnesses to spike amongst children.

Governed as an independent municipality, Ulaanbaatar is surrounded by Töv Province, whose capital Zuunmod lies 43 kilometres (27 mi) south of the city. With a population of just over 1.6 million as of December 2022, it contains almost half of the country's total population. As the country's primate city, it serves as its cultural, industrial and financial heart and the centre of its transport network.

== Names and etymology ==
The city at its establishment in 1639 was referred to as Örgöö (Mongolian: ᠥᠷᠭᠦᠭᠡ; Өргөө, lit. 'Palace'). This name was eventually adapted in the West as Urga, being derived from the Russian form. By 1651, it began to be referred to as Nomiĭn Khüree (Mongolian: ᠨᠣᠮ‍᠎ᠤᠨ ᠬᠦᠷᠢᠶ᠎ᠡ; Номын хүрээ, lit. 'Khüree of Wisdom'), and by 1706 it was referred to as Ikh Khüree (Mongolian: ᠶᠡᠬᠡ ᠬᠦᠷᠢᠶ᠎ᠡ; Их хүрээ, lit. 'Great Khüree'). The Chinese equivalent, Dà Kùlún (Chinese: 大庫倫, Mongolian: Да Хүрээ), was rendered into Western languages as Kulun or Kuren.

Other names include Bogdiin Khuree (Mongolian: ᠪᠣᠭᠳᠠ᠎ᠤᠨ ᠬᠦᠷᠢᠶ᠎ᠡ; Богдын хүрээ, lit. 'The Bogd's Khüree'), or simply Khüree (Mongolian: ᠬᠦᠷᠢᠶ᠎ᠡ; Хүрээ, romanized: Küriye), itself a term originally referring to an enclosure or settlement.

Upon independence in 1911, with both the secular government and the Bogd Khan's palace present, the city's name was changed to Niĭslel Khüree (Mongolian: ᠨᠡᠢᠰᠯᠡᠯ ᠬᠦᠷᠢᠶ᠎ᠡ; Нийслэл Хүрээ, lit. 'Capital Khüree').

When the city became the capital of the new Mongolian People's Republic on 29 October 1924, its name was changed to Ulaanbaatar (lit. 'Red Hero'), possibly in honor of Damdin Sükhbaatar. At the meeting of the 1st Great People's Khural in 1924, the majority of delegates voted in favor of renaming the capital of Mongolia to Bator-khoto ("City of the Hero," implicitly referring to the figure of Genghis Khan). Nevertheless, at the insistence of the Comintern representative, Soviet-Kazakhstan political figure T. R. Ryskulov, who previously had no connection to Mongolia, the city was named Ulan Bator Khoto ("City of the Red Hero"). After the vote, he gave a speech:

Genghis Khan was a national hero, but he was a conqueror. Present-day People's Mongolia has no imperialistic goals; it wants to liberate itself and develop independently, along revolutionary lines. Therefore, the name Ulaanbaatar-Khoto will be a revolutionary name, and it will be understandable to everyone. The prefix Ulan ("red") gives this name a revolutionary character, symbolizing the revolutionary steadfastness of the Mongolian people in their struggle for independence.

In the Western world, Ulaanbaatar continued to be generally known as Urga or Khuree until 1924, and afterward as Ulan Bator (Russian: Улан-Батор, romanized: Ulan-Bator). Although related to the Russian form, Ulan Bator was approved by the Mongolian Post Office. This form was defined two decades before the Mongolian name received its current Cyrillic spelling and transliteration (1941–1950); however, the name of the city was spelled Ulaanbaatar koto during the decade in which Mongolia used the Latin alphabet.

== History ==
Historical affiliations

Qing dynasty (1636 – 1911)
Bogd Khanate of Mongolia (1911 – 1919)
Republic of China (1919 – 1921)
Mongolian People's Republic (1924 – 1992)
Mongolia (1992 – present)

=== Prehistory ===
Human habitation at the site of Ulaanbaatar dates from the Lower Paleolithic, with a number of sites on the Bogd Khan, Buyant-Ukhaa and Songinokhairkhan mountains, revealing tools which date from 300,000 years ago to 40,000–12,000 years ago. These Upper Paleolithic people hunted mammoth and woolly rhinoceros, the bones of which are found abundantly around Ulaanbaatar.

=== Before 1639 ===
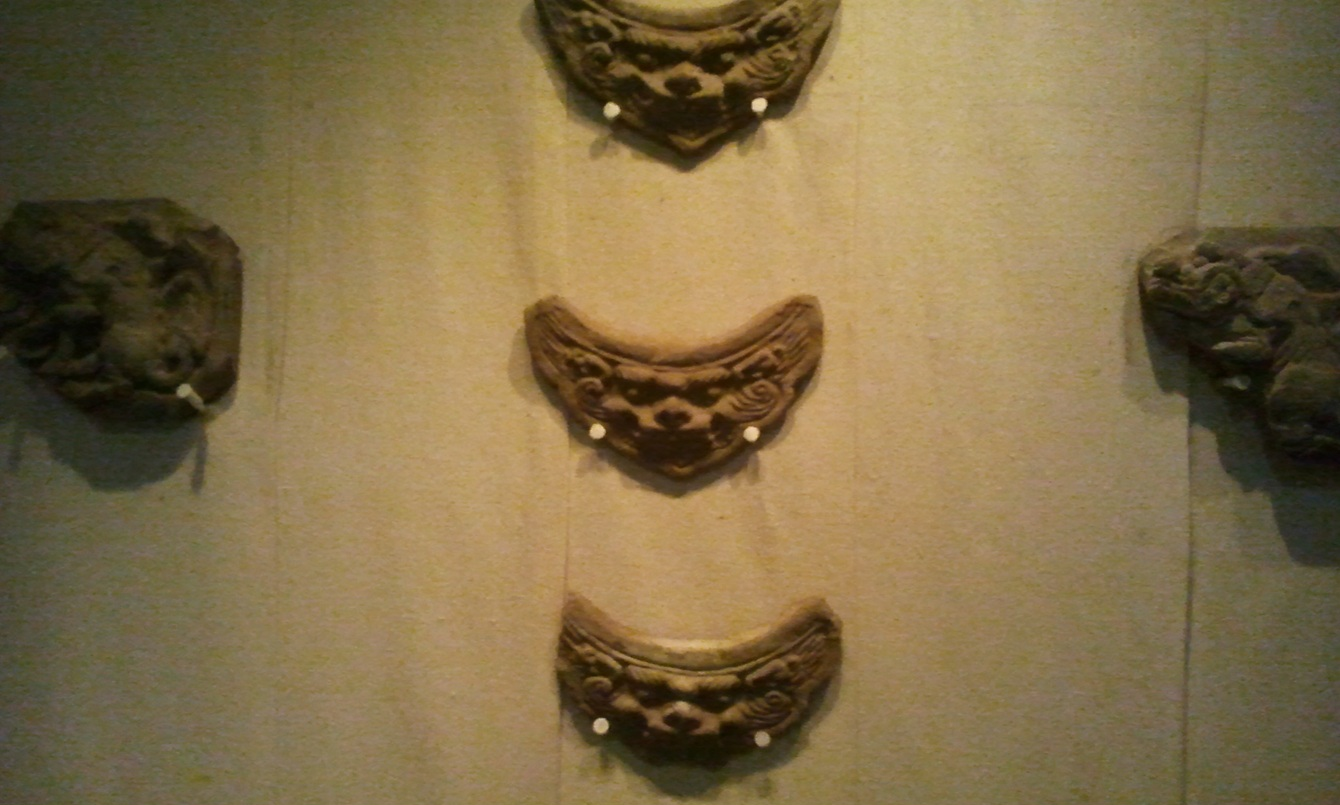
Roof tiles recovered from Wang Khan's 12th-century palace in Ulaanbaatar

A number of Xiongnu-era royal tombs have been discovered around Ulaanbaatar, including the tombs of Belkh Gorge near Dambadarjaalin monastery and tombs of Songinokhairkhan. Located on the banks of the Tuul River, Ulaanbaatar has been well within the sphere of Turco-Mongol nomadic empires throughout history.

Wang Khan, Toghrul of the Keraites, a Nestorian Christian monarch whom Marco Polo identified as the legendary Prester John, is said to have had his palace here (the Black Forest of the Tuul River) and forbade hunting in the holy mountain Bogd Uul. The palace is said to be where Genghis Khan stayed with Yesui Khatun before attacking the Tangut in 1226, though accounts of the Mongol invasion of Tangut are conflicted.

During the Mongol Empire (1206–1368) and Northern Yuan dynasty (1368–1635), the main, natural route from the capital region of Karakorum to the birthplace and tomb of the Khans in the Khentii mountain region (Ikh Khorig) passed through the area of Ulaanbaatar. The Tuul River naturally leads to the north-side of Bogd Khan Mountain, which stands out as a large island of forest positioned conspicuously at the south-western edge of the Khentii mountains. As the main gate and stopover point on the route to and from the holy Khentii mountains, the Bogd Khan Mountain saw large amounts of traffic going past it and was protected from early times. Even after the Northern Yuan period it served as the location of the annual and triannual Assembly of Nobles (Khan Uuliin Chuulgan).

=== Mobile monastery ===
Founded in 1639 as a yurt monastery as Örgöö (lit. 'palace-yurt'), the settlement was first located at Lake Shireet Tsagaan nuur (75 kilometres (47 miles) directly east of the imperial capital Karakorum) in what is now Burd sum, Övörkhangai, around 230 kilometres (143 miles) south-west from the present site of Ulaanbaatar, and was intended by the Mongol nobles to be the seat of Zanabazar, the first Jebtsundamba Khutughtu. Zanabazar returned to Mongolia from Tibet in 1651, and founded seven aimags (monastic departments) in Urga, later establishing four more.

As a mobile monastery-town, Örgöö was often moved to various places along the Selenge, Orkhon and Tuul rivers, as supply and other needs would demand. During the Dzungar wars of the late 17th century, it was even moved to Inner Mongolia. As the city grew, it moved less and less.

The movements of the city can be detailed as follows: Shireet Tsagaan Nuur (1639), Khoshoo Tsaidam (1640), Khentii Mountains (1654), Ogoomor (1688), Inner Mongolia (1690), Tsetserlegiin Erdene Tolgoi (1700), Daagandel (1719), Usan Seer (1720), Ikh Tamir (1722), Jargalant (1723), Eeven Gol (1724), Khujirtbulan (1729), Burgaltai (1730), Sognogor (1732), Terelj (1733), Uliastai River (1734), Khui Mandal (1736), Khuntsal (1740), Udleg (1742), Ogoomor (1743), Selbe (1747), Uliastai River (1756), Selbe (1762), Khui Mandal (1772) and Selbe (1778).

In 1778, the city moved from Khui Mandal and settled for good at its current location, near the confluence of the Selbe and Tuul rivers, and beneath Bogd Khan Uul, at that time also on the caravan route from Beijing to Kyakhta.

One of the earliest Western mentions of Urga is the account of the Scottish traveller John Bell in 1721:

What they call the Urga is the court, or the place where the prince (Tusheet Khan) and high priest (Bogd Jebtsundamba Khutugtu) reside, who are always encamped at no great distance from one another. They have several thousand tents about them, which are removed from time to time. The Urga is much frequented by merchants from China and Russia, and other places.

By Zanabazar's death in 1723, Urga was Mongolia's preeminent monastery in terms of religious authority. A council of seven of the highest-ranking lamas (Khamba Nomon Khan, Ded Khamba and five Tsorj) made most of the city's religious decisions. It had also become Outer Mongolia's commercial centre. From 1733 to 1778, Urga moved around the vicinity of its present location. In 1754, the Erdene Shanzodba Yam of Urga was given authority to supervise the administrative affairs of the Bogd's subjects. It also served as the city's chief judicial court. In 1758, the Qianlong Emperor appointed the Khalkha Vice General Sanzaidorj as the first Mongol amban of Urga, with full authority to "oversee the Khuree and administer well all the Khutugtu's subjects".

In 1761, a second amban was appointed for the same purpose, a Manchu one. A quarter-century later, in 1786, a decree issued in Peking gave right to the Urga ambans to decide the administrative affairs of Tusheet Khan and Setsen Khan territories. With this, Urga became the highest civil authority in the country. Based on Urga's Mongol governor Sanzaidorj's petition, the Qianlong Emperor officially recognized an annual ceremony on Bogd Khan Mountain in 1778 and provided the annual imperial donations. The city was the seat of the Jebtsundamba Khutuktus, two Qing ambans, and a Chinese trade town grew "four trees" 4.24 km (2.63 mi) east of the city centre at the confluence of the Uliastai and Tuul rivers.

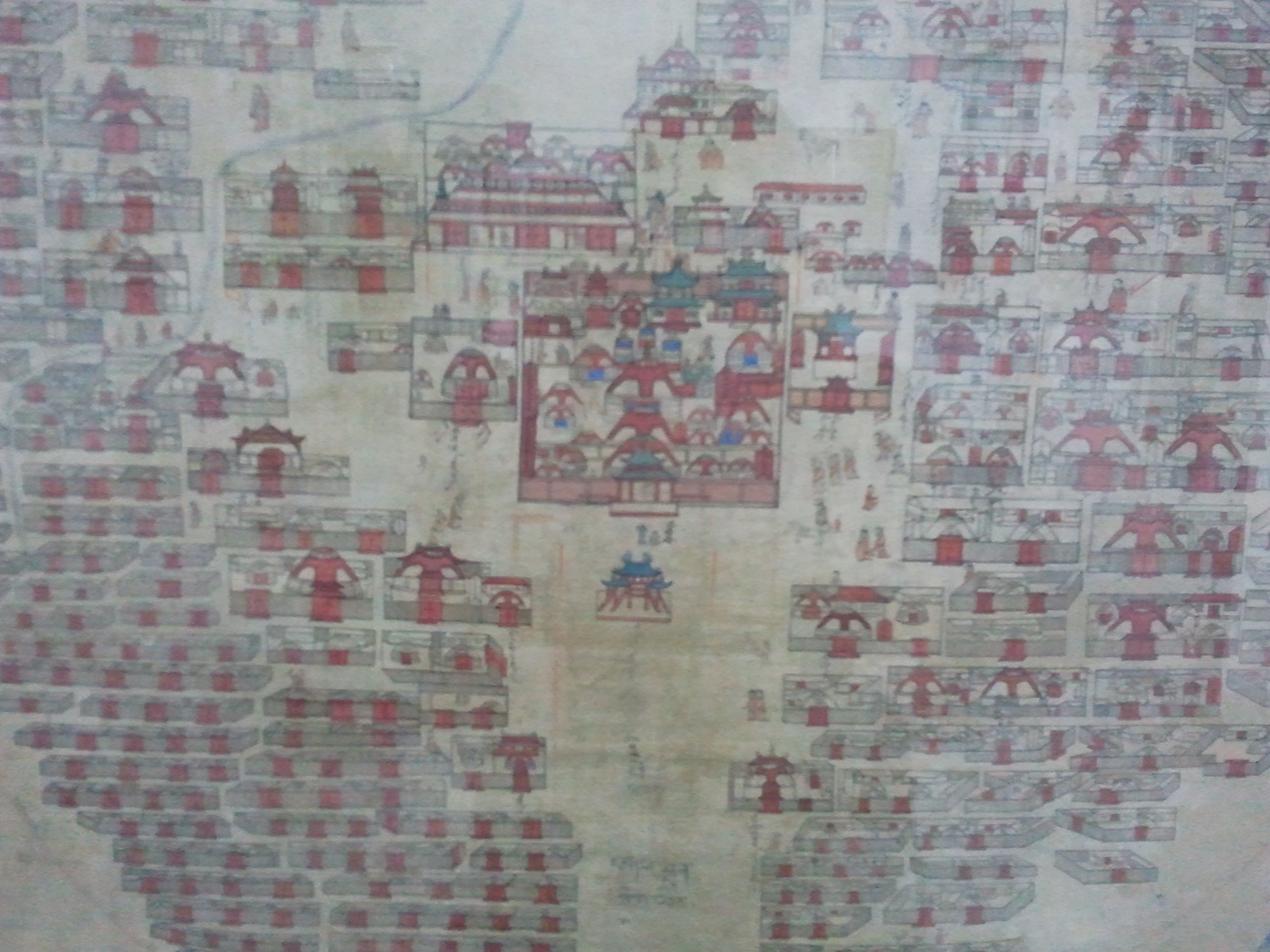
Detail of 19th-century painting of Urga (Ulaanbaatar): in the centre the movable square temple of Bat Tsagaan, built in 1654, besides numerous other temples

By 1778, Urga may have had as many as ten thousand monks, who were regulated by a monastic rule, Internal Rule of the Grand Monastery or Yeke Kuriyen-u Doto'adu Durem. For example, in 1797 a decree of the 4th Jebtsundamba forbade "singing, playing with archery, myagman, chess, usury and smoking"). Executions were forbidden where the holy temples of the Bogd Jebtsundama could be seen, so capital punishment took place away from the city.

In 1839, the 5th Bogd Jebtsundamba moved his residence to Gandan Hill, an elevated position to the west of the Baruun Damnuurchin markets. Part of the city was moved to nearby Tolgoit. In 1855, the part of the camp that moved to Tolgoit was brought back to its 1778 location, and the 7th Bogd Jebtsundamba returned to the Zuun Khuree. The Gandan Monastery flourished as a centre of philosophical studies.

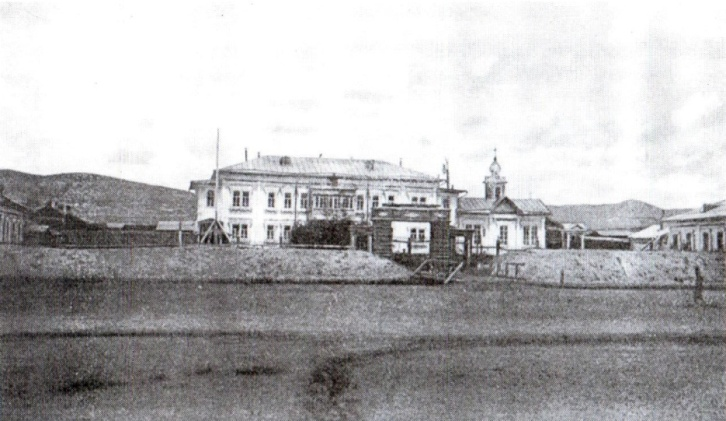
The Russian Consulate of Urga (Ulaanbaatar) and the Holy Trinity Church, both built in 1863

=== Urga and the Kyakhta trade ===
Following the Treaty of Kyakhta in 1727, Urga (Ulaanbaatar) was a major point of the Kyakhta trade between Russia and China – mostly Siberian furs for Chinese cloth and later tea. The route ran south to Urga, southeast across the Gobi Desert to Kalgan, and southeast over the mountains to Peking. Urga was also a collection point for goods coming from further west. These were either sent to China or shipped north to Russia via Kyakhta, because of legal restrictions and the lack of good trade routes to the west.

By 1908, there was a Russian quarter with a few hundred merchants and a Russian club and informal Russian mayor. East of the main town was the Russian consulate, built in 1863, with an Orthodox church, a post office and 20 Cossack guards. It was fortified in 1900 and briefly occupied by troops during the Boxer Rebellion. There was a telegraph line north to Kyakhta and southeast to Kalgan and weekly postal service along these routes.

Beyond the Russian consulate was the Chinese trading post called Maimaicheng, and nearby the palace of the Manchu viceroy. With the growth of Western trade at the Chinese ports, the tea trade to Russia declined, some Chinese merchants left, and wool became the main export. Manufactured goods still came from Russia, but most were now brought from Kalgan by caravan. The annual trade was estimated at 25 million rubles, nine-tenths in Chinese hands and one-tenth in Russian.

The Moscow trade expedition of the 1910s estimated the population of Urga at 60,000, based on Nikolay Przhevalsky's study in the 1870s.

The city's population swelled during the Naadam festival and major religious festivals to more than 100,000. In 1919, the number of monks had reached 20,000, up from 13,000 in 1810.

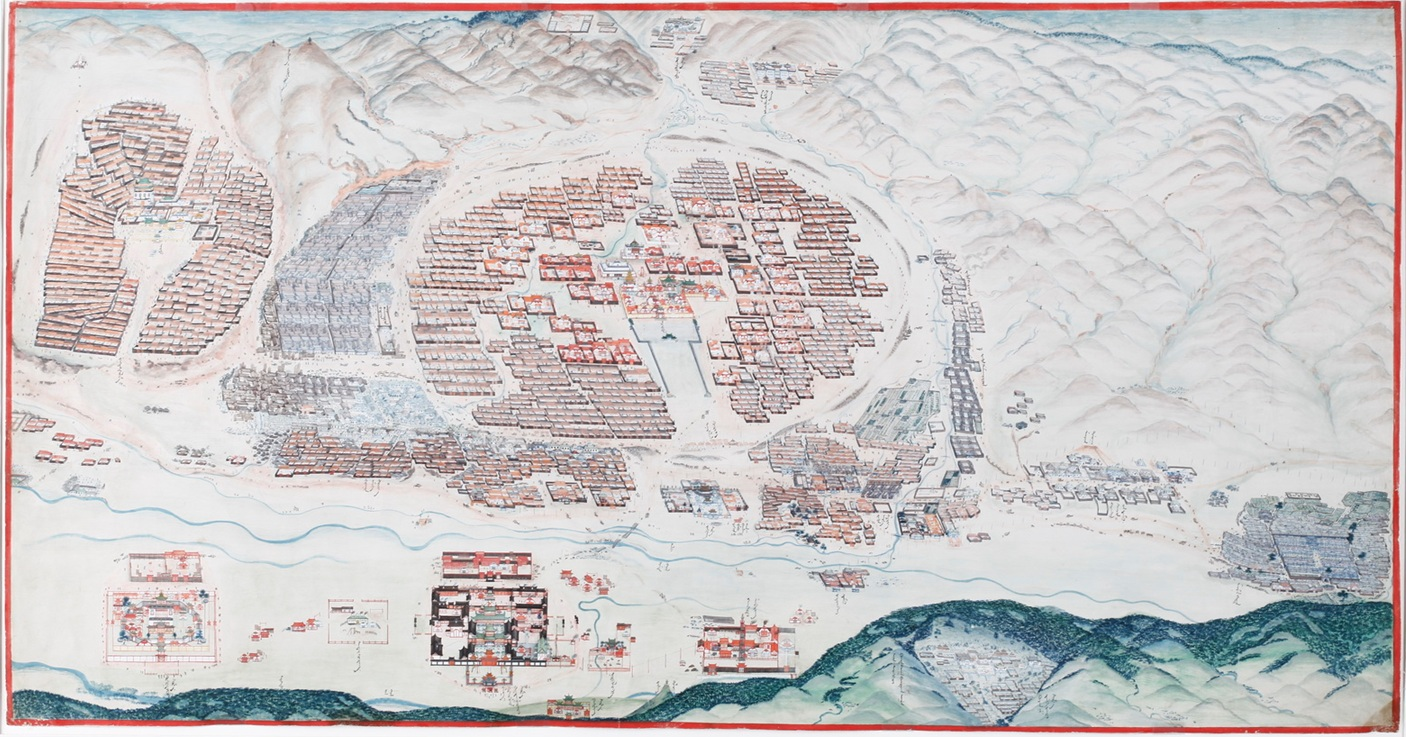
A 1913 panorama of the city. The large circular compound in the middle is the Zuun Khuree temple-palace complex. The Gandan temple complex is to the left. The palaces of the Bogd are to the south of the river. To the far bottom right of the painting is the Maimaicheng district. To its left are the white buildings of the Russian consulate area. Manjusri Monastery can be seen on Mount Bogd Khan Uul at the bottom-right of the painting.

=== Independence and Niislel Khüree ===
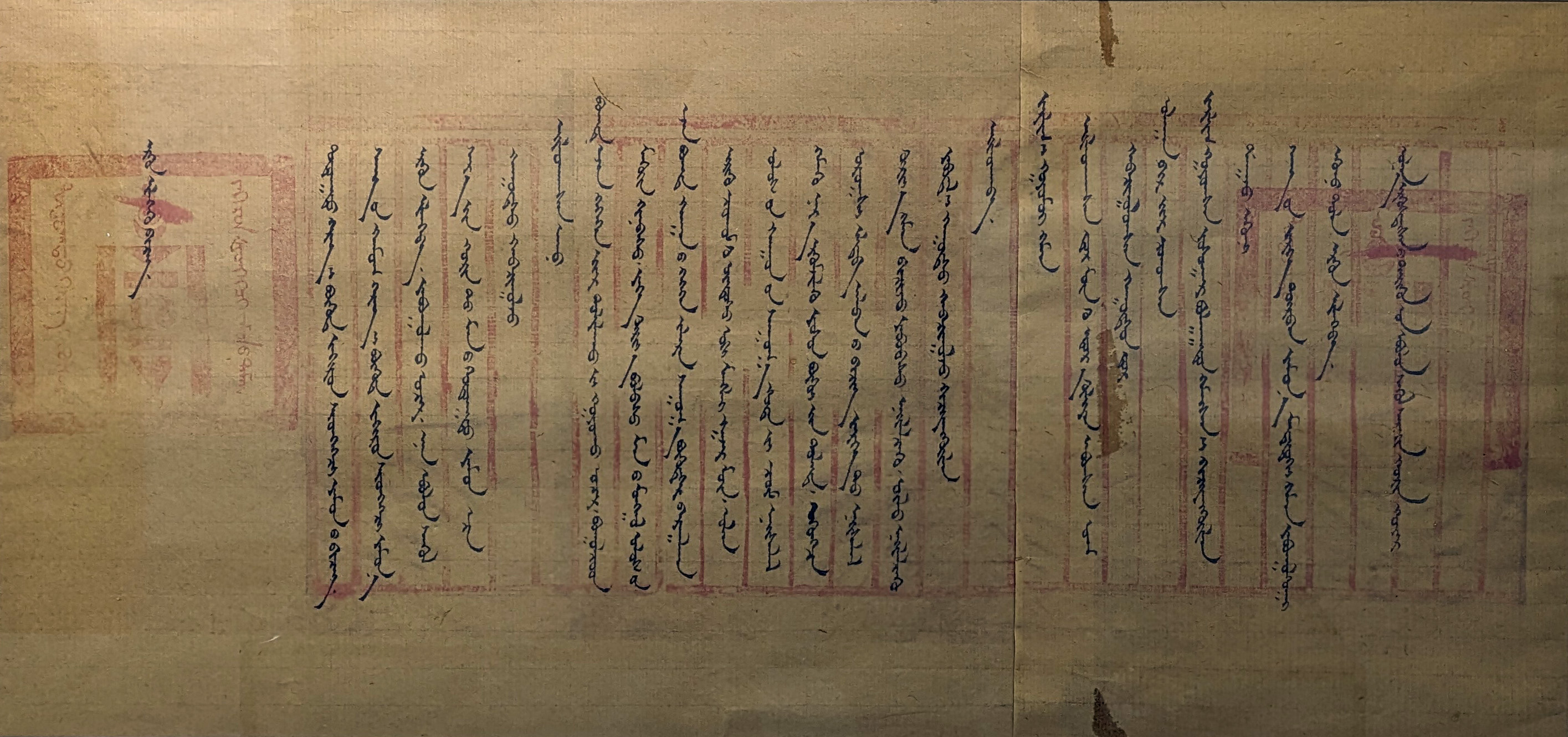
Jarlig proclaiming Ikh Khüree as Niislel (Capital) Khüree, 1912

In 1910, the amban Sando went to quell a major fight between Gandan lamas and Chinese traders started by an incident at the Da Yi Yu shop in the Baruun Damnuurchin market district. He was unable to bring the lamas under control, and was forced to flee back to his quarters. In 1911, with the Qing dynasty in China headed for total collapse, Mongolian leaders in Ikh Khüree for Naadam met in secret on Mount Bogd Khan Uul and resolved to end 220 years of Manchu control of their country.

On 29 December 1911, the 8th Jebtsundamba Khutughtu was declared ruler of an independent Mongolia and assumed the title Bogd Khan. Khüree as the seat of the Jebtsundamba Khutugtu was the logical choice for the capital of the new state. However, following the tripartite Kyakhta agreement of 1915, Mongolia's status was effectively reduced to mere autonomy.

In 1919, Mongolian nobles, over the opposition of the Bogd Khan, agreed with the Chinese resident Chen Yi on a settlement of the "Mongolian question" along Qing-era lines, but before this settlement could be put into effect, Khüree was occupied by the troops of Chinese warlord Xu Shuzheng, who forced the Mongolian nobles and clergy to renounce autonomy completely.

The city changed hands twice in 1921. First, on 4 February, a mixed Russian/Mongolian force led by White Russian warlord Roman von Ungern-Sternberg captured the city, freeing the Bogd Khan from Chinese imprisonment and killing a part of the Chinese garrison. Baron Ungern's capture of Urga was followed by the clearing out of Mongolia's small gangs of demoralized Chinese soldiers and, at the same time, looting and murder of foreigners, including a vicious pogrom that killed off the Jewish community.

On 22 February 1921, the Bogd Khan was once again elevated to Great Khan of Mongolia in Urga. However, at the same time that Baron Ungern was taking control of Urga, a Soviet-supported Communist Mongolian force led by Damdin Sükhbaatar was forming in Russia, and in March they crossed the border. Ungern and his men rode out in May to meet Red Russian and Red Mongolian troops, but suffered a disastrous defeat in June.

In July 1921, the Communist Soviet-Mongolian army became the second conquering force in six months to enter Urga, and Mongolia came under the control of Soviet Russia. On 29 October 1924, the town was renamed Ulaanbaatar. On the session of the 1st Great People's Khuraldaan of Mongolia in 1924, a majority of delegates had expressed their wish to change the capital city's name to Baatar Khot (lit. 'Hero City'). However, under pressure from Turar Ryskulov, a Kazakh Soviet activist of the Communist International, the city was named Ulaanbaatar Khot (lit. 'Red-Hero City').

=== Socialist era ===
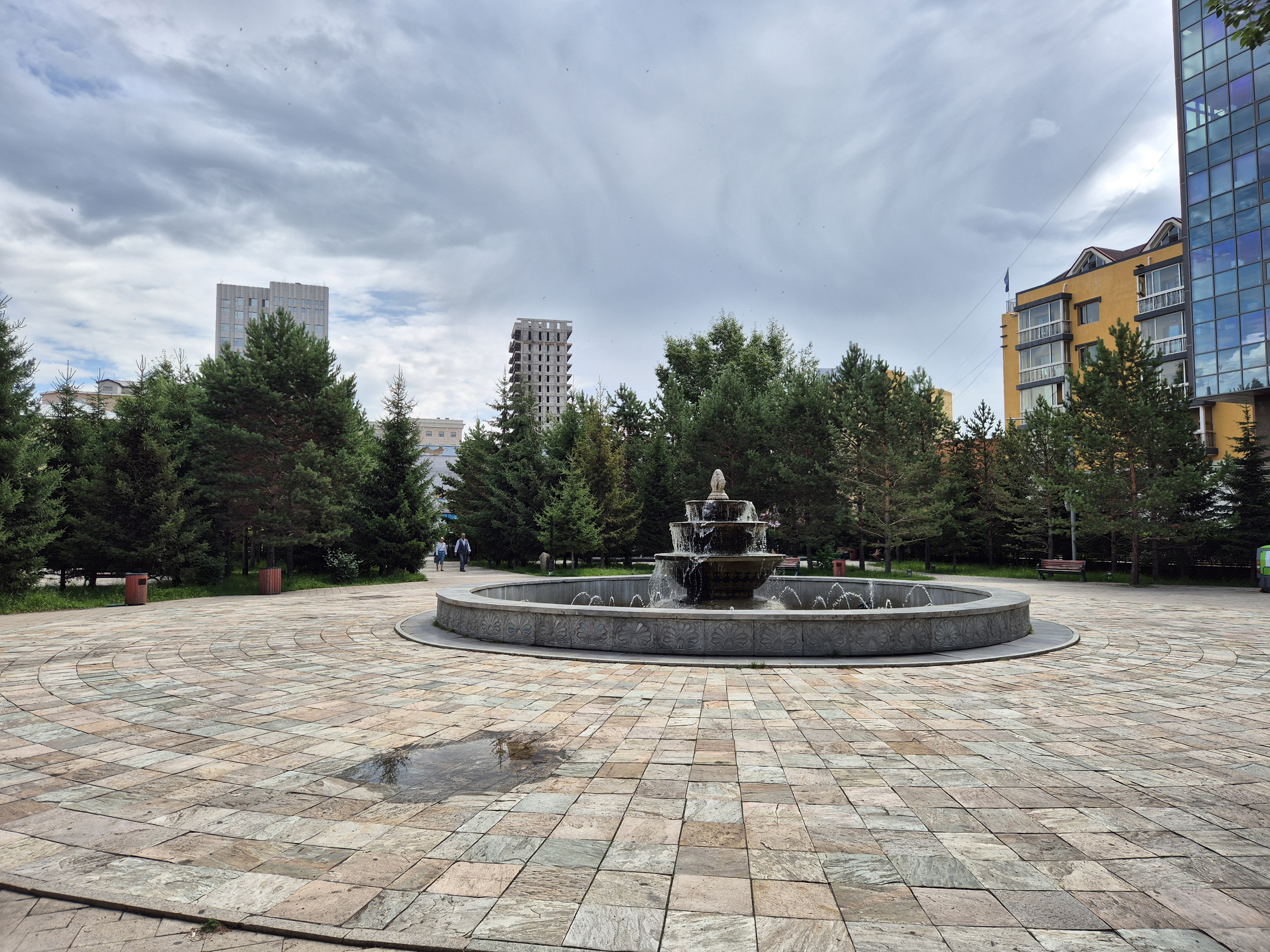
Green areas were increased in the city centre during the communist era

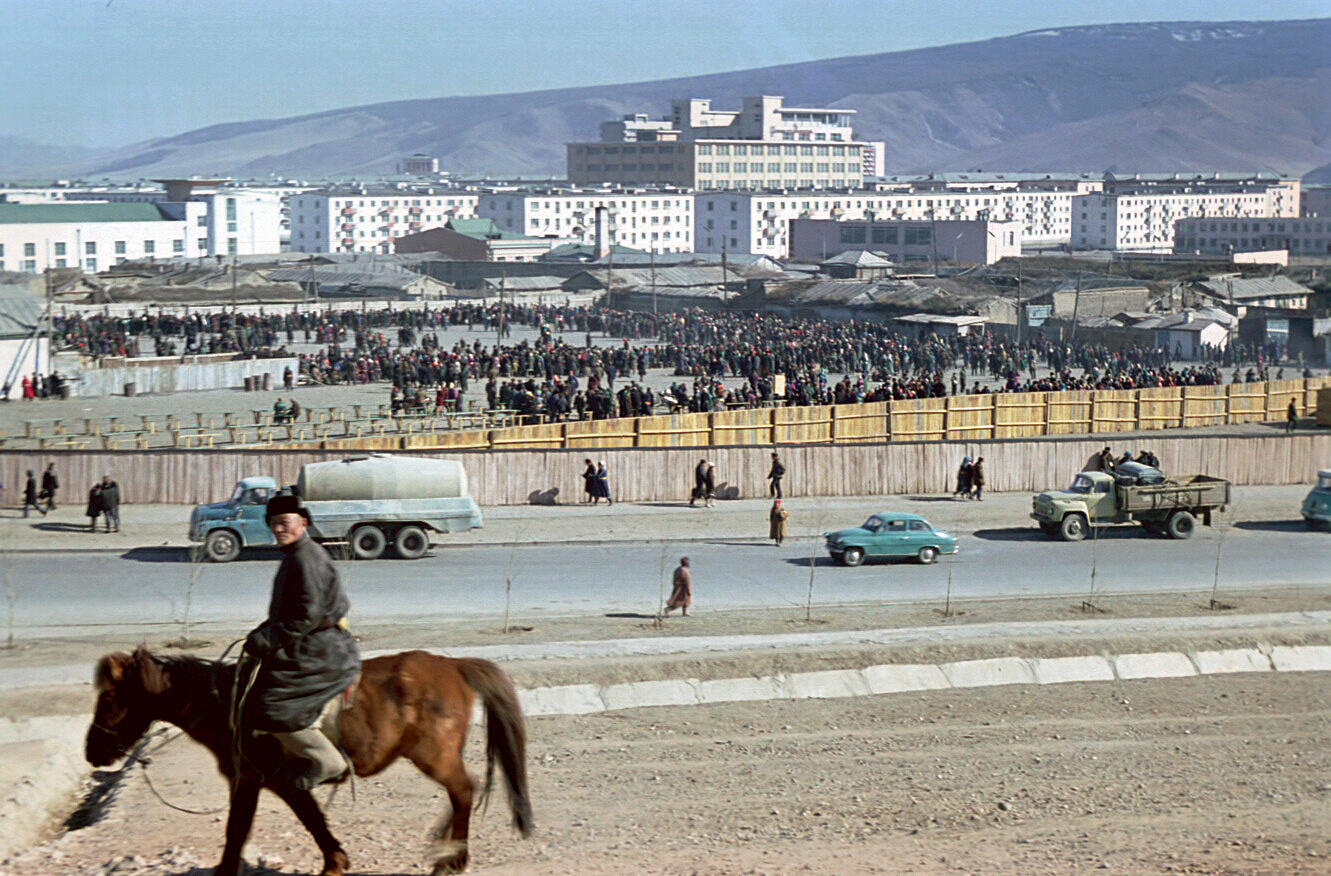
Outdoor market near Gandan Hill in 1972; State Department Store in the background

During the socialist period, especially following the Second World War, most of the old ger districts were replaced by Soviet-style blocks of flats, often financed by the Soviet Union. Urban planning began in the 1950s, and much of the city core today is a result of construction between 1960 and 1985.

The Trans-Mongolian Railway, connecting Ulaanbaatar with Moscow and Beijing, was completed in 1956, and cinemas, theaters, museums and other modern facilities were erected. Most of the temples and monasteries of pre-socialist Khüree were destroyed following the anti-religious purges of the late 1930s. The Gandan Monastery was reopened in 1944 when the U.S. Vice President Henry Wallace asked to see a monastery during his visit to Mongolia.

=== Contemporary era ===
Ulaanbaatar and chiefly Sükhbaatar Square was a major site of demonstrations that led to Mongolia's transition to democracy and market economy in 1990. Starting on 10 December 1989, protesters outside the Youth Culture Centre called for Mongolia to implement perestroika and glasnost in their full sense. After months of large-scale demonstrations and hunger strikes, the governing Mongolian People's Revolutionary Party resigned on 9 March 1990. The provisional government announced Mongolia's first free elections, which were held in July 1990, paving the way for the new constitution of 1992 and the dissolution of the Mongolian People's Republic.

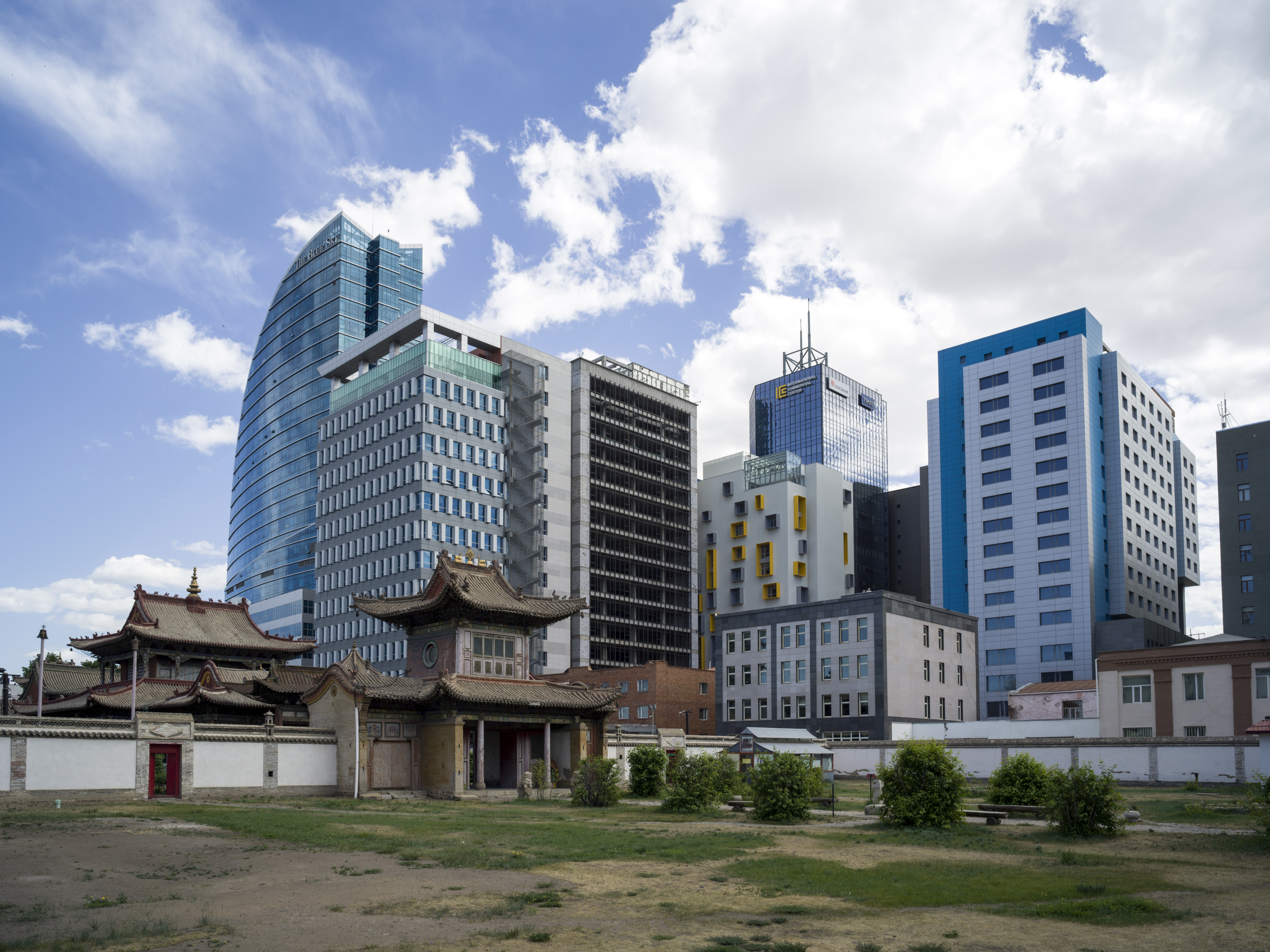
Downtown Ulaanbaatar near Choijin Lama Temple in 2017

Since Mongolia's transition to a market economy in 1990, the city has experienced rapid growth. From a population of 535,000 in 1990, it had grown to 1 million inhabitants by 2007, and 1.5 million by 2021, or about half the entire country's population. Much of this rapid population rise is attributed to migration from rural areas, as herder families abandon their traditional lifestyles in search of opportunities in the city. Much of these new arrivals settle in ger districts without plumbing, sanitation, central heating, and basic services. This rise in population, including the formation of new settlement areas, has not been accompanied with appropriate investment in infrastructure and services, hampering development and causing a myriad of problems.

Ulaanbaatar was the scene of riots in 2008 after supporters of the opposition parties disputed the ruling Mongolian People's Revolutionary Party's claim of victory after the parliamentary elections. A four-day state of emergency was declared, the capital was placed under a curfew, and alcohol sales banned with no further riots taking place. This was the first deadly riot in modern Ulaanbaatar's history.

In April 2013, Ulaanbaatar hosted the 7th Ministerial Conference of the Community of Democracies, and has also lent its name to the Ulaanbaatar Dialogue on Northeast Asian Security.

Chinggis Khaan International Airport in south of Ulaanbaatar was opened to the public on 4 July 2021 as the main airport of the city.

Since the 2010s, Ulaanbaatar has seen a construction boom filling the city with high-rise offices and apartment blocks.

==== Demolition of historic buildings ====
Since 2013, a number of landmark buildings and structures have been demolished in Ulaanbaatar, despite considerable public outcry. This includes the White Gate at Nisekh in September 2013, the Memorial Museum of Victims of Political Repression in October 2019, the Natural History Museum in December 2019, Buildings #3 and #6 of the National University of Mongolia, The main building of the University of Finance and Economics in 2023, and Bumbugur.

The 2019 Mongolian government budget originally included items for the demolition of a number of historic neoclassical buildings in the heart of Ulaanbaatar, including the Natural History Museum, Academic Theatre of Opera and Ballet, Drama Theatre and National Library. The decision was met by a public outcry and criticism from the Union of Mongolian Architects, which demanded that the buildings be preserved and restored. In January 2020, culture minister Yondonperenlein Baatarbileg denied that the government intended to demolish buildings other than the Natural History Museum, and stated that the government planned to renovate them instead.

== Geography ==
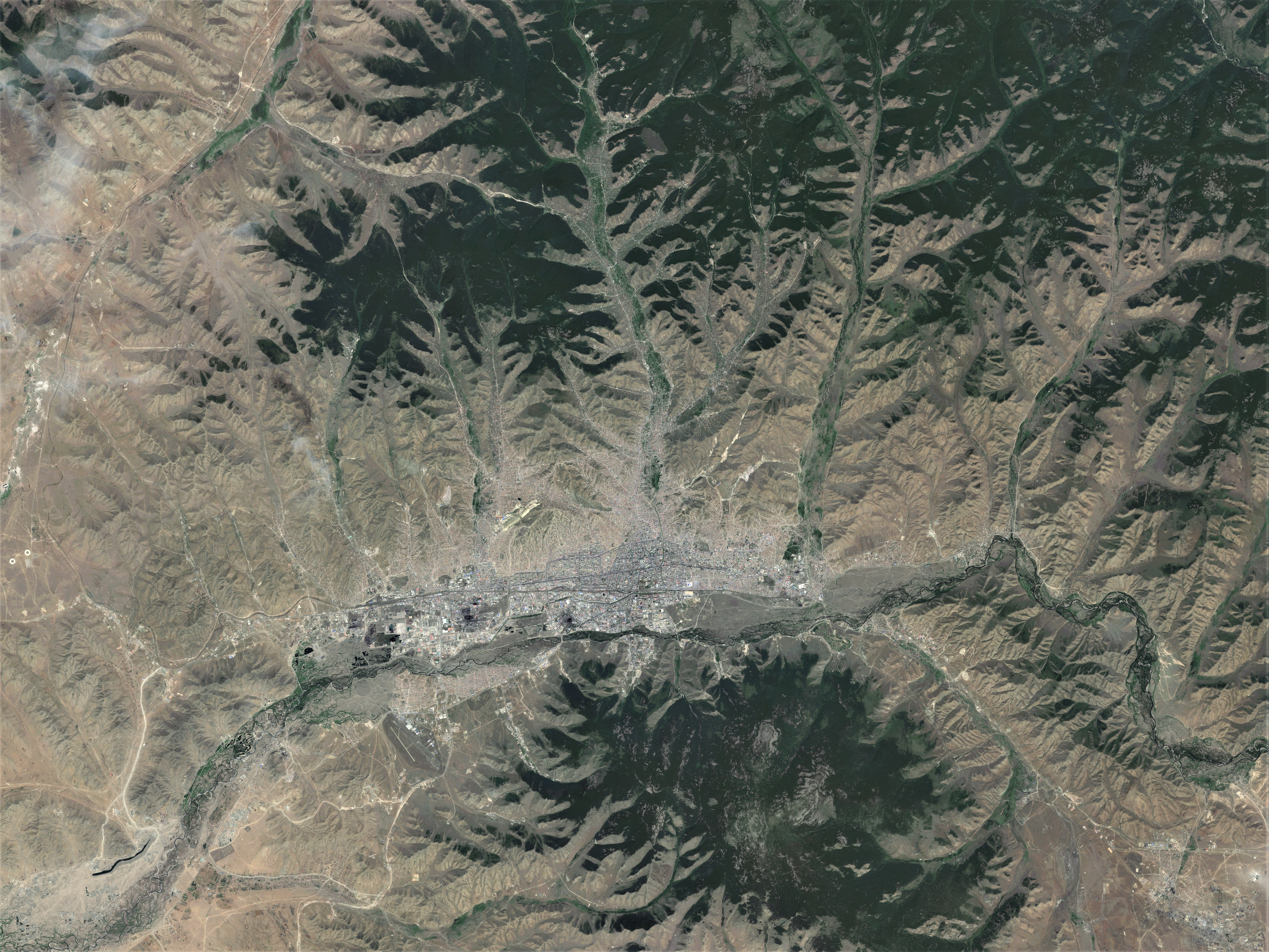
Satellite image of Ulaanbaatar, showing the city core along the Tuul River Valley with Bogd Khan Mountain dominating the south. The city's ger districts sprawl into the mountainous areas in the north.

Ulaanbaatar is located at about 1,350 metres (4,430 ft) above mean sea level, slightly east of the centre of Mongolia, on the Tuul River, a sub-tributary of the Selenge, in a valley at the foot of Bogd Khan Mountain. Bogd Khan Mountain is a broad, heavily forested mountain rising 2,250 metres (7,380 ft) to the south of Ulaanbaatar. It forms the boundary between the steppe zone to the south and the forest-steppe zone to the north. Traditionally, Ulaanbaatar is said to be surrounded by four peaks, clockwise from west: Songino Khairkhan, Chingeltei, Bayanzurkh, and finally Bogd Khan Mountain.

The forests of the mountains surrounding Ulaanbaatar are composed of evergreen pines, deciduous larches and birches, while the riverine forest of the Tuul River is composed of broad-leaved, deciduous poplars, elms and willows. Ulaanbaatar lies at roughly the same latitude as Vienna, Munich, Orléans and Seattle. It lies at roughly the same longitude as Chongqing, Hanoi and Jakarta.

=== Climate ===
Owing to its high elevation, its relatively high latitude, its location hundreds of kilometres from any coast, and the effects of the Siberian anticyclone, Ulaanbaatar is the coldest national capital in the world, and the coldest city on the planet with more than a million inhabitants, with a monsoon-influenced, cold semi-arid climate (Köppen BSk, Trewartha BSbc, USDA Plant Hardiness Zone 3a). Aside from precipitation and from a thermal standpoint, the city is on the boundary between humid continental (Dwb) and subarctic (Dwc). This is due to its 10.2 °C (50.4 °F) mean temperature for the month of May.

The city features brief, warm summers and long, bitterly cold and dry winters. The coldest January temperatures, usually at the time just before sunrise, are between −36 and −40 °C (−32.8 and −40.0 °F) with no wind, because of temperature inversion. Most of the annual precipitation of 267 millimetres (10.51 in) falls from May to September. The highest recorded annual precipitation in the city was 659 millimetres or 25.94 inches at the Khureltogoot Astronomical Observatory on Bogd Khan Mountain. Ulaanbaatar has an average annual temperature of 0.2 °C or 32.4 °F, making it the coldest capital in the world. Ulaanbaatar's annual average is brought down by its cold winter temperatures even though it is significantly warm from late April to early October.

The city lies in the zone of discontinuous permafrost, which means that building is difficult in sheltered locations that preclude thawing in the summer, but easier on more exposed ones where soils fully thaw. Suburban residents live in traditional yurts that do not protrude into the soil. Extreme temperatures in the city range from −43.9 °C (−47.0 °F) in January 1957 to 39.0 °C (102.2 °F) in July 1988.

Climate data for Ulaanbaatar, elevation 1,303 m (4,275 ft), (1991–2020 normals, extremes 1869–present)
Month	Jan	Feb	Mar	Apr	May	Jun	Jul	Aug	Sep	Oct	Nov	Dec	Year
Record high °C (°F)	0.0 (32.0)	11.3 (52.3)	18.9 (66.0)	28.7 (83.7)	33.5 (92.3)	38.3 (100.9)	39.0 (102.2)	36.7 (98.1)	31.7 (89.1)	22.5 (72.5)	13.0 (55.4)	6.1 (43.0)	39.0 (102.2)
Mean maximum °C (°F)	−7.5 (18.5)	2.6 (36.7)	9.0 (48.2)	15.7 (60.3)	27.5 (81.5)	31.1 (88.0)	32.8 (91.0)	30.9 (87.6)	24.5 (76.1)	18.6 (65.5)	6.5 (43.7)	0.3 (32.5)	33.8 (92.8)
Mean daily maximum °C (°F)	−15.5 (4.1)	−9.4 (15.1)	−0.2 (31.6)	10.4 (50.7)	17.8 (64.0)	23.1 (73.6)	25.2 (77.4)	23.0 (73.4)	17.2 (63.0)	7.7 (45.9)	−4.8 (23.4)	−13.7 (7.3)	6.7 (44.1)
Daily mean °C (°F)	−21.3 (−6.3)	−16.2 (2.8)	−6.7 (19.9)	3.0 (37.4)	10.2 (50.4)	16.6 (61.9)	19.0 (66.2)	16.6 (61.9)	10.0 (50.0)	0.9 (33.6)	−10.6 (12.9)	−19.0 (−2.2)	0.2 (32.4)
Mean daily minimum °C (°F)	−25.6 (−14.1)	−21.7 (−7.1)	−12.6 (9.3)	−3.3 (26.1)	3.5 (38.3)	10.3 (50.5)	13.5 (56.3)	11.1 (52.0)	4.1 (39.4)	−4.5 (23.9)	−15.1 (4.8)	−22.9 (−9.2)	−5.3 (22.5)
Mean minimum °C (°F)	−37.1 (−34.8)	−30.5 (−22.9)	−25.1 (−13.2)	−17.3 (0.9)	−8.4 (16.9)	3.0 (37.4)	5.1 (41.2)	1.9 (35.4)	−6.8 (19.8)	−19.6 (−3.3)	−27.3 (−17.1)	−33.1 (−27.6)	−38.7 (−37.7)
Record low °C (°F)	−43.9 (−47.0)	−42.2 (−44.0)	−37.2 (−35.0)	−26.1 (−15.0)	−16.1 (3.0)	−3.9 (25.0)	−0.2 (31.6)	−2.8 (27.0)	−13.4 (7.9)	−20.0 (−4.0)	−35.0 (−31.0)	−42.2 (−44.0)	−43.9 (−47.0)
Average precipitation mm (inches)	2.1 (0.08)	2.8 (0.11)	4.6 (0.18)	8.4 (0.33)	21.7 (0.85)	47.2 (1.86)	74.5 (2.93)	65.4 (2.57)	27.9 (1.10)	8.6 (0.34)	6.3 (0.25)	3.5 (0.14)	273 (10.74)
Average precipitation days (≥ 1.0 mm)	1.3	1.6	1.8	2.5	3.7	6.7	9.9	8.8	4.9	2.1	2.8	1.7	47.8
Average rainy days	0	0	0.3	3	8	14	17	15	9	2	0.1	0	68
Average snowy days	10	7	7	6	4	0.1	0	0	2	6	9	11	62
Average relative humidity (%)	74.7	69.5	57.6	44.2	42.7	50.1	58.2	60.8	56.1	56.9	68.3	75.1	62
Mean monthly sunshine hours	164.2	203.5	257.4	265.3	297.9	282.3	278.3	265.2	249.5	227.6	175.4	137.7	2,804.3
Source 1: Pogoda.ru.net
Source 2: NOAA(humidity-sun 1991-2020)

Climate data for Buyant-Ukhaa International Airport weather station (WMO identifier: 44291) (between 1991-2020)
Month	Jan	Feb	Mar	Apr	May	Jun	Jul	Aug	Sep	Oct	Nov	Dec	Year
Average dew point °C (°F)	−24.7 (−12.5)	−20.9 (−5.6)	−14.5 (5.9)	−9.6 (14.7)	−3.8 (25.2)	4.5 (40.1)	9.4 (48.9)	7.9 (46.2)	0.5 (32.9)	−7.6 (18.3)	−15.7 (3.7)	−22.6 (−8.7)	−8.1 (17.4)

=== Cityscape ===
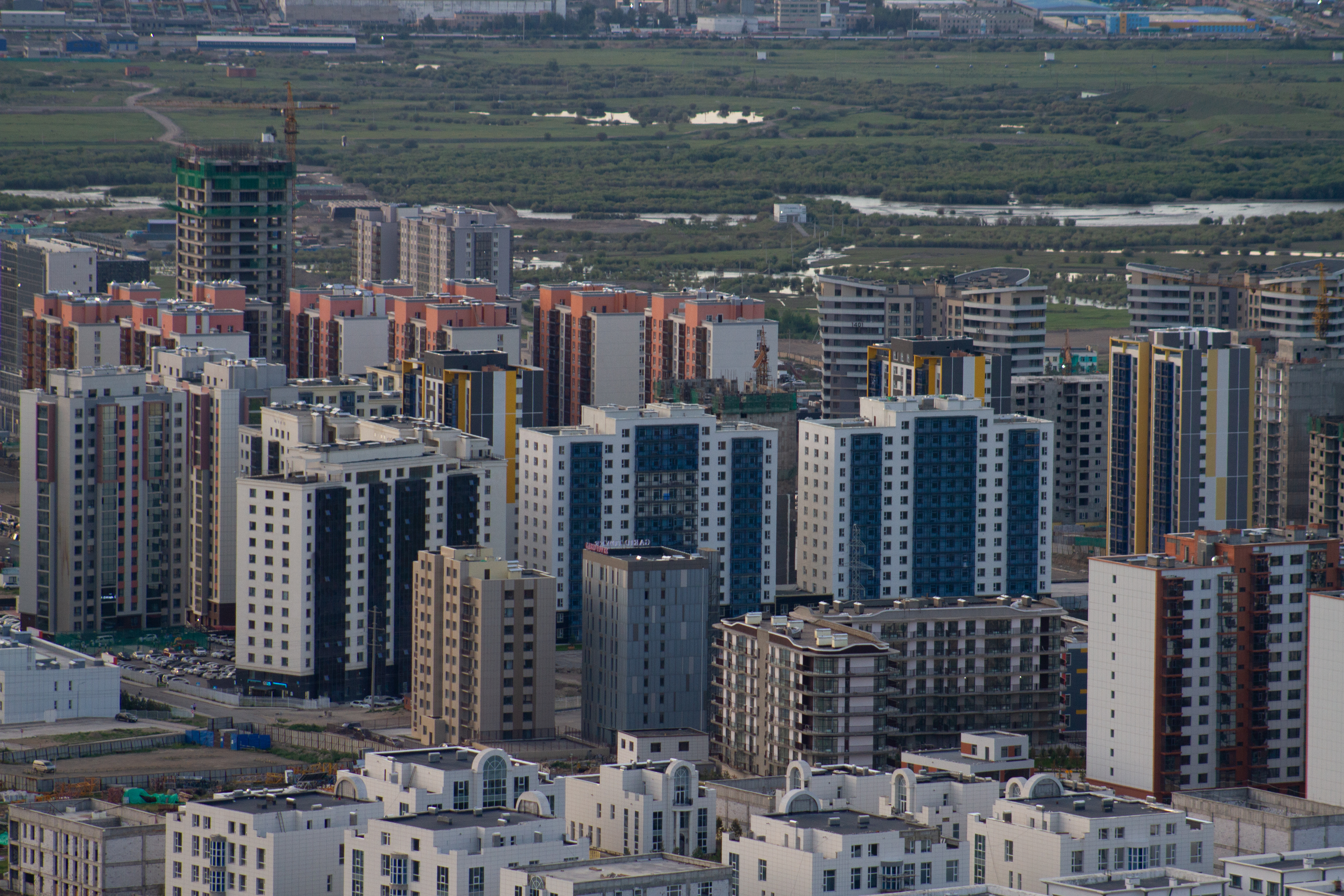
New high-rise construction in Yaarmag area, situated in the south-west

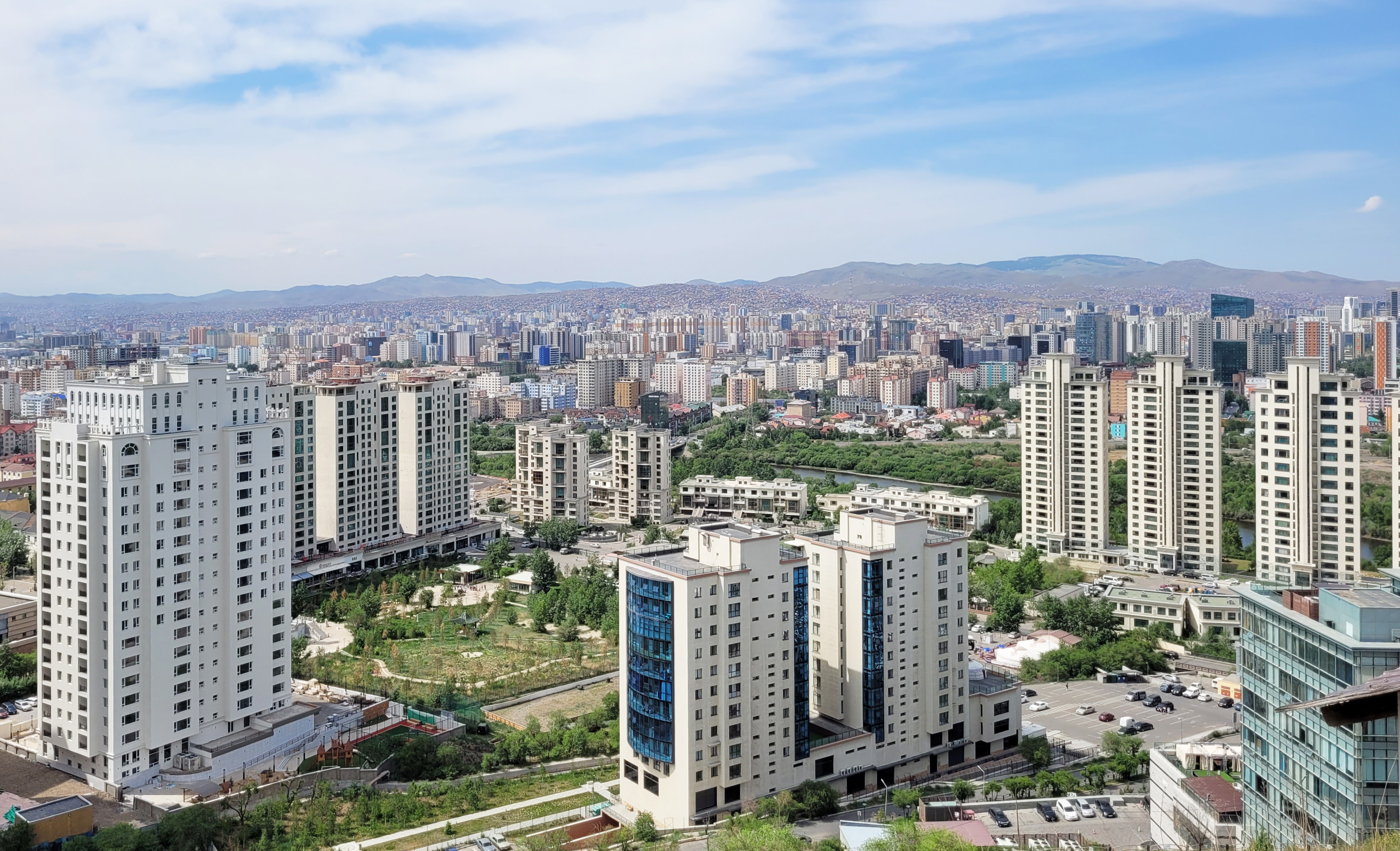
Skylines in southern Ulaanbaatar as viewed from Zaisan Memorial

The city's inner core consists of a central district built in 1940s- and 1950s-style Soviet architecture, surrounded by and mingled with residential concrete towerblocks and large ger districts. Starting after the fall of communism, many of the towerblocks' ground floors were modified and upgraded to small shops, and many new buildings have been erected—some illegally, as some private companies erect buildings without legal licenses/permits. Since the 2010s, a construction boom has been ongoing, leading to many high-rise apartment and office blocks in the inner core as well as new settlement areas.

Sükhbaatar Square, in the government district, is the centre of Ulaanbaatar and contains in the middle a statue of revolutionary hero Damdin Sükhbaatar on horseback; and in the north side a statue of Chinggis Khan. To the north is the Government Palace, while Peace Avenue (Enkh Taivny Urgon Chuloo), the main thoroughfare through town, runs along the south side of the square.

Major landmarks include the Gandantegchinlen Monastery, the socialist monument complex at Zaisan Memorial with its views over the city, the Bogd Khan's Winter Palace, and the Choijin Lama Temple. As of 2024, Mongolia's tallest building is Tower C, part of the Shangri-La Hotel complex at 136 m. Mongolia's tallest building will soon be the Encanto Trade Center, a 150 m skyscraper currently under construction and expected to be completed in 2026.

Important shopping districts include the 3rd Microdistrict Boulevard (simply called Khoroolol or "the District"), Peace Avenue around the State Department Store (simply called Ikh Delguur or "Great Store") and the Narantuul Market area (simply called Zakh or "the Market").

Ulaanbaatar presently has multiple cinemas, one modern ski resort, two large indoor stadiums, several large department stores and one large amusement park. Food, entertainment and recreation venues are steadily increasing in variety.

=== Parks ===
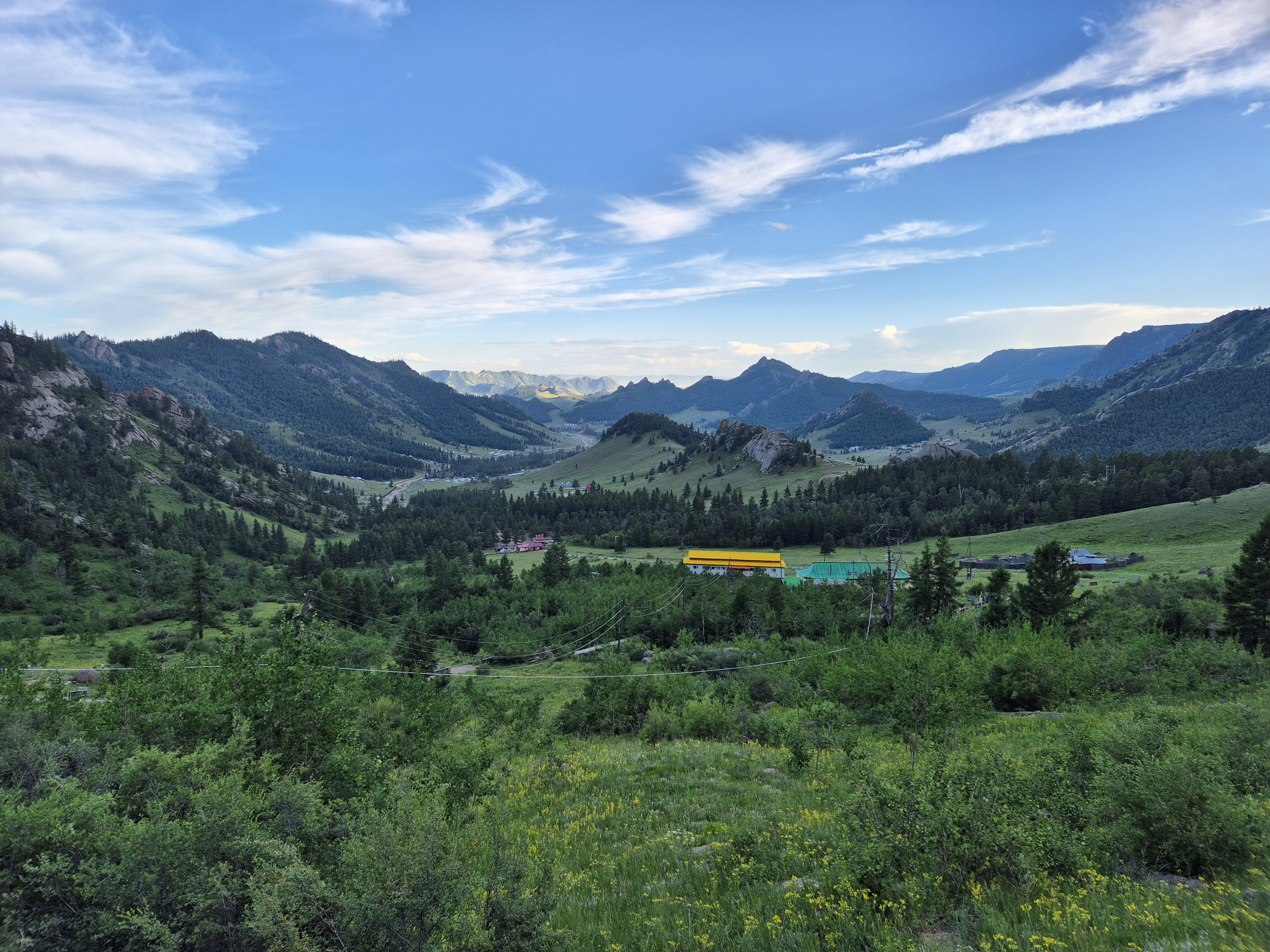
Gorkhi-Terelj National Park is a popular picnic and camping ground all year round

A number of national parks and protected areas officially belong to the city. Gorkhi-Terelj National Park, a nature preserve with many tourist facilities, is approximately 70 km (43 mi) from Ulaanbaatar. Routes 2 and 3 of the long-distance hiking trail Mongol Olle Trail are located within this park. The 40-metre-high (130-foot) Genghis Khan Equestrian Statue is 54 km (34 mi) east of the city centre.

Bogd Khan Uul, which dominates the south, is a strictly protected area with a length of 31 kilometres (19 miles) and width of 3 kilometres (1.9 miles), covering an area of 67,300 hectares (166,302 acres). Nature conservation dates back to the twelfth and thirteenth centuries when the Tooril Khan of the Mongolian Ancient Keraite Aimag – who prohibited logging and hunting activities – claimed the Bogd Khan as a holy mountain. The ruins of Manjusri Monastery are located on the southern flank of Bogd Khan Mountain and is a popular destination for outings.

Bogd Khan Mountain can be clearly seen non-obscured from National Garden Park

The National Amusement Park is an amusement park located in the downtown section, south of Shangri-La Hotel. It is also a popular place for young people to hang out. This small amusement park features rides, games and paddle boats. Its original Artificial Lake Castle was built in 1969.

The National Garden Park, in the southeastern outskirts of the city, opened in 2009 and has become a popular summer destination for residents. It has a total area of 55 hectares, with over 100,000 trees planted. The park is geared towards becoming an educational centre for healthy, responsible living as well as environmental education.

Other city parks, gardens or forests in the city are Bogd Khaan Memorial Garden, Korea-Mongolia Friendship Forest and Misheel Botanical Garden.

== Demographics ==
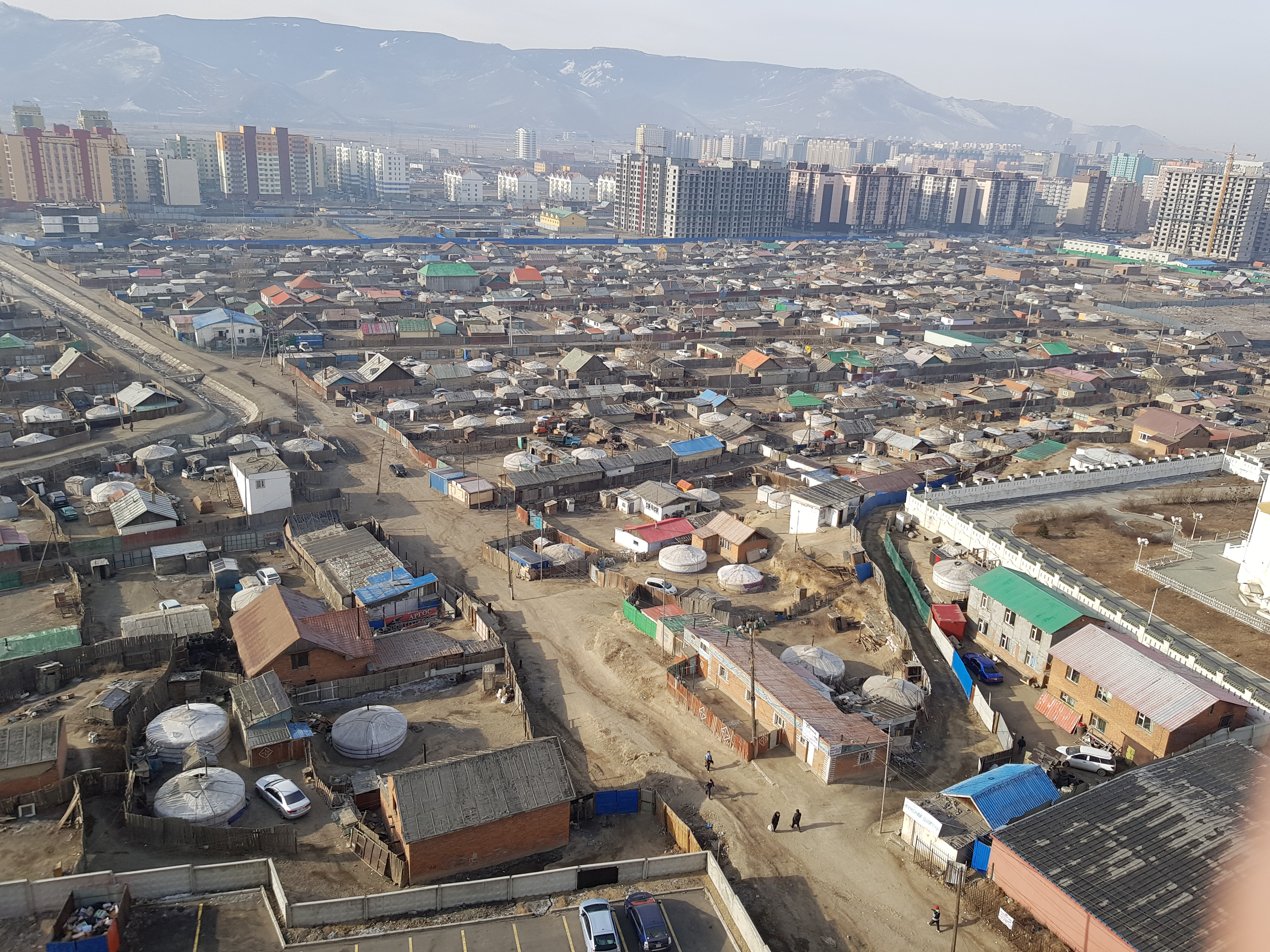
Ger districts against a backdrop of new high-rise buildings in Ulaanbaatar

Historical population
Year	Pop.	±%
1950	69,951	—
1960	179,063	+156.0%
1970	297,615	+66.2%
1979	396,300	+33.2%
1989	540,300	+36.3%
2000	760,077	+40.7%
2010	1,089,358	+43.3%
2020	1,395,773	+28.1%

As Mongolia's primate city, Ulaanbaatar has been the focal point for urbanization and migration from rural areas. With a population of 400,000 in 1979, it has experienced rapid growth in the following decades; the city reached 1 million inhabitants around 2007. Population growth in the 2010s averaged 2.7% a year, representing a two-fold fall from the previous decade. In 2020, the city's population was recorded as 1,466,125.

Two-thirds of the city's inhabitants live in ger districts, areas with inadequate infrastructure, sanitation, and public services.

64.6% of the population was reported to have been born in Ulaanbaatar. The foreign-born population was recorded as 17,456 in 2020.

=== Religion ===
Ulaanbaatar has a long tradition of Buddhism, having been initially founded and settled as a monastic centre. Prominent places of worship in the city include the Gandantegchinlen Monastery and Choijin Lama Temple. In modern times, it has become a multifaith centre, having added multiple Christian churches (such as the Orthodox Holy Trinity Church, as well as the Catholic Saints Peter and Paul Cathedral) and Islamic mosques such as the Ulaanbaatar Central Mosque.

According to the 2020 national census, 46.3% of the population over 15 years of age identified as being irreligious, while 53.7% identified as being religious, a decrease of 7.7 percentage points in religiosity since the 2010 census.

Of the people identifying as religious, responses included Buddhism (89.1%), Shamanism (5.4%), Christianity (3.3%), and Islam (0.9%). Muslims in Ulaanbaatar are mostly the ethnic Kazakhs minority who reside in Nalaikh.

== Governance ==
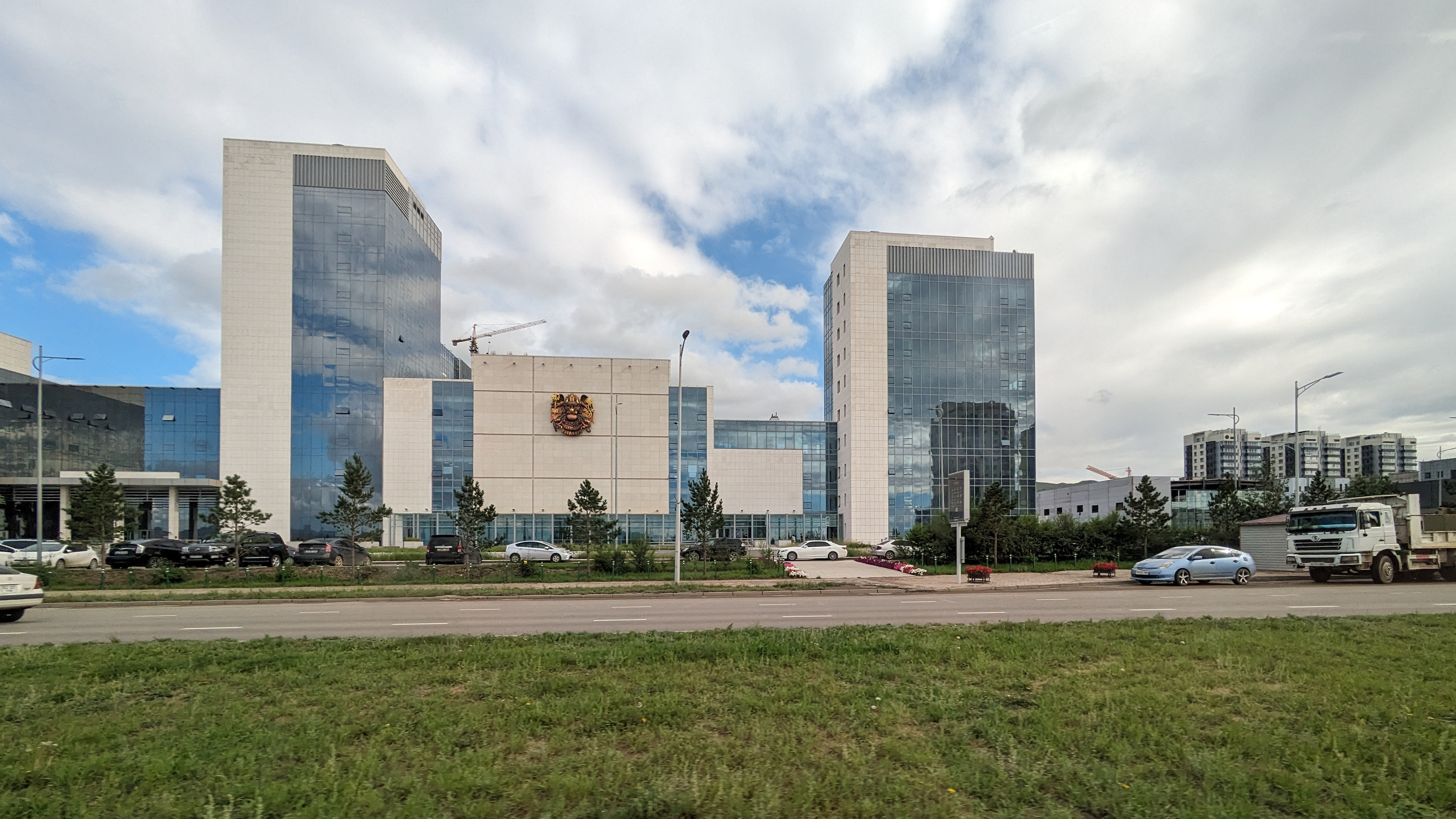
Newly built city government headquarters in Yaarmag area, Khan Uul

Ulaanbaatar is treated as an independent first-level region, separate from the surrounding Töv Aimag. It is governed by the Ulaanbaatar City Council with 45 members, elected every four years. The Prime Minister of Mongolia appoints the Governor of the Capital City and Mayor of Ulaanbaatar with four-year terms upon the city council's nomination.

=== Districts ===
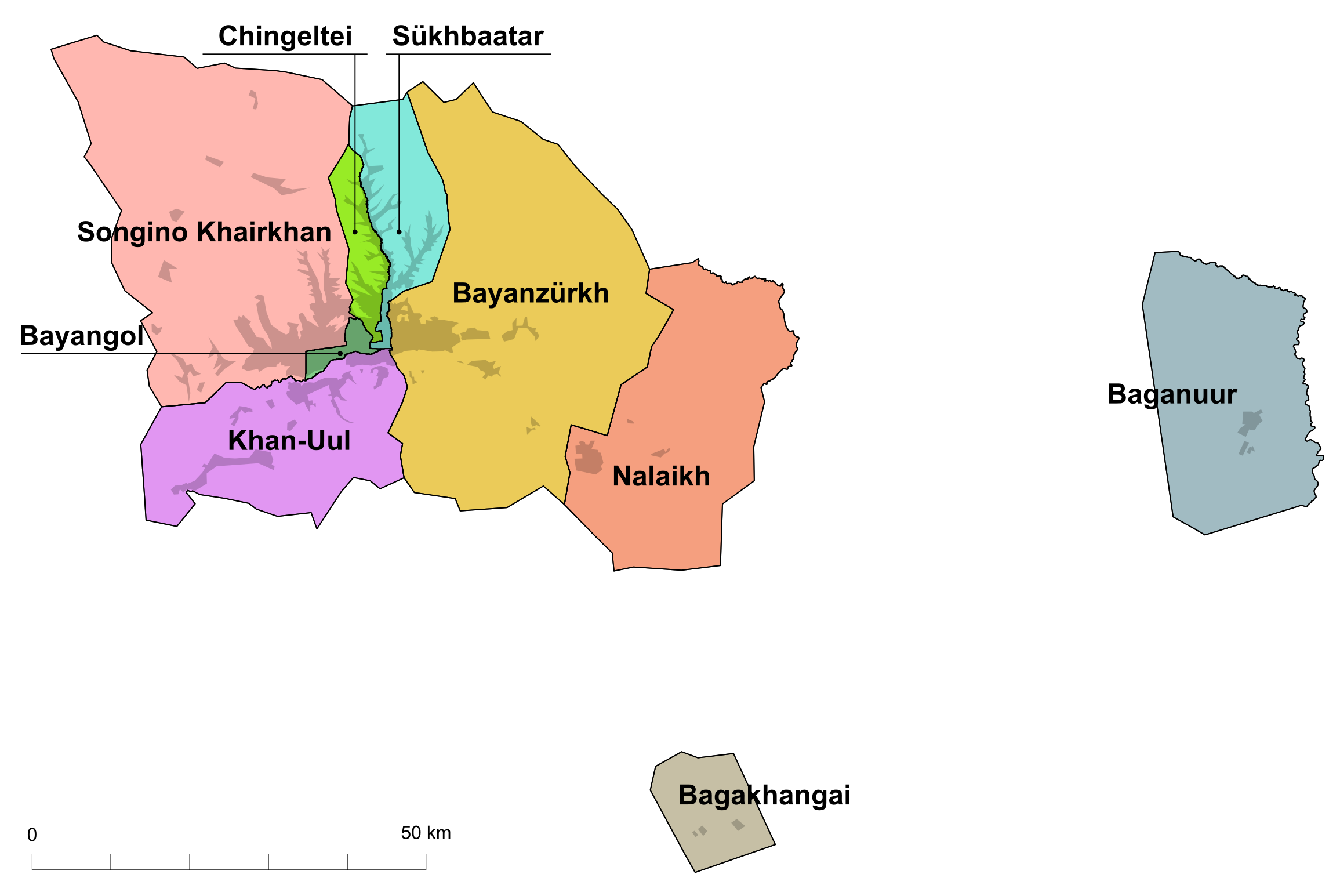
Map of the districts of Ulaanbaatar

The city is divided into nine districts (Mongolian: дүүрэг, romanized: Düüreg): Baganuur, Bagakhangai, Bayangol, Bayanzürkh, Chingeltei, Khan-Uul, Nalaikh, Songino Khairkhan and Sükhbaatar. Each district is subdivided into khoroos, of which there are 204. Each khoroo is further divided into kheseg (Mongolian: xэсэг), which is the smallest administrative unit of Ulaanbaatar. Each district also serves as a constituency that elects one or more representatives into the State Great Khural, the national parliament.

Although administratively part of Ulaanbaatar, Nalaikh and Baganuur are separate cities. Bagakhangai and Baganuur are noncontiguous exclaves, the former located within the Töv Province, the latter on the border between Töv and Khentii provinces.

Khangar'd symbol used by the city's various municipal institutions

=== Municipal symbols ===
The official emblem of Ulaanbaatar is the garuḍa, a mythical bird in both Buddhist and Hindu scriptures, referred to as the Khangar'd (Mongolian: Хангарьд, lit. 'Khan Garuda') by Mongols.

The garuḍa appears on Ulaanbaatar's emblem. In its right hand is a key, a symbol of prosperity and openness, and in its left is a lotus flower, a symbol of peace, equality and purity. In its talons it is holding a snake, a symbol of evil of which it is intolerant. On the garuḍa's forehead is the soyombo symbol, which is featured on the flag of Mongolia. The city's flag is sky blue representing the eternal sky and has the garuḍa in the centre.

== Economy ==
The largest corporations and conglomerates of Mongolia are almost all headquartered in Ulaanbaatar. In 2017, Ulaanbaatar had five billionaires and 95 multimillionaires with net worth above 8 million dollars. Major Mongolian companies include MCS Group, Gatsuurt LLC, Genco, MAK, Altai Trading, Tavan Bogd Group, Mobicom Corporation, Bodi, Shunkhlai, Monnis, Suu and Petrovis. While not on the level of multinational corporations, most of these companies are multi-sector conglomerates with far-reaching influence in the country.

Ulaanbaatar (Urga) has been a key location where the economic history and wealth creation of the nation has played out. Unlike the highly mobile dwellings of herders nomadizing between winter and summer pastures, Urga was set up to be a semi-permanent residence of the high lama Zanabazar. It stood in one location (Khoshoo Tsaidam) from 1640 to 1654, an unusually long period of 15 years, before Zanabazar moved it east to the foot of Mount Saridag in the Khentii Mountains. Here he set about building a permanent monastery town with stone buildings. Urga stayed at Mount Saridag for a full 35 years and was indeed assumed to be permanent there when Oirats suddenly invaded the region in 1688 and burnt down the city. With a major part of his life's work destroyed, Zanabazar had to take the mobile portion of Urga and flee to Inner Mongolia.

More than half the wealth created in Urga in the period from 1639 to 1688 is thought to have been lost in 1688. Only in 1701 did Urga return to the region and start a second period of expansion, but it had to remain mobile until the end of the 70-year-long Dzungar-Qing Wars in 1757. After settling down in its current location in 1778, Urga saw sustained economic growth, but most of the wealth went to the Buddhist clergy, nobles as well as the temporary Shanxi merchants based in the eastern and western China-towns of Urga. There were numerous companies called puus (пүүс) and temple treasuries called jas (жас), which functioned as businesses, but none of these survived the Communist period. During the Mongolian People's Republic, private property was only marginally tolerated, while most assets were state-owned. The oldest companies still operating in Ulaanbaatar date to the early MPR. Only the Gandantegchinlen Monastery has been operating non-stop for 205 years (with a 6-year gap during World War II), but whether it can be seen as a business is still debated.

Downtown Ulaanbaatar as seen from Sükhbaatar Square, 2014

As Mongolia's main industrial centre, Ulaanbaatar produces a variety of consumer goods, and it is responsible for about two-thirds of Mongolia's total gross domestic product (GDP).

The transition to a market economy in 1990 has so far correlated with an increase in GDP, leading to a shift towards service industries (which now make up 43% of the city's GDP) along with rapid urbanization and population growth.

Mining is the second-largest contributor to Ulaanbaatar's GDP, at 25%. North of the city are several gold mines, including the Boroo Gold Mine, and foreign investment in the sector has allowed for growth and development. However, in light of a noticeable drop in GDP during the 2008 financial crisis, as demand for mining exports dropped, there has been movement towards diversifying the economy.

== Culture ==
=== Arts ===
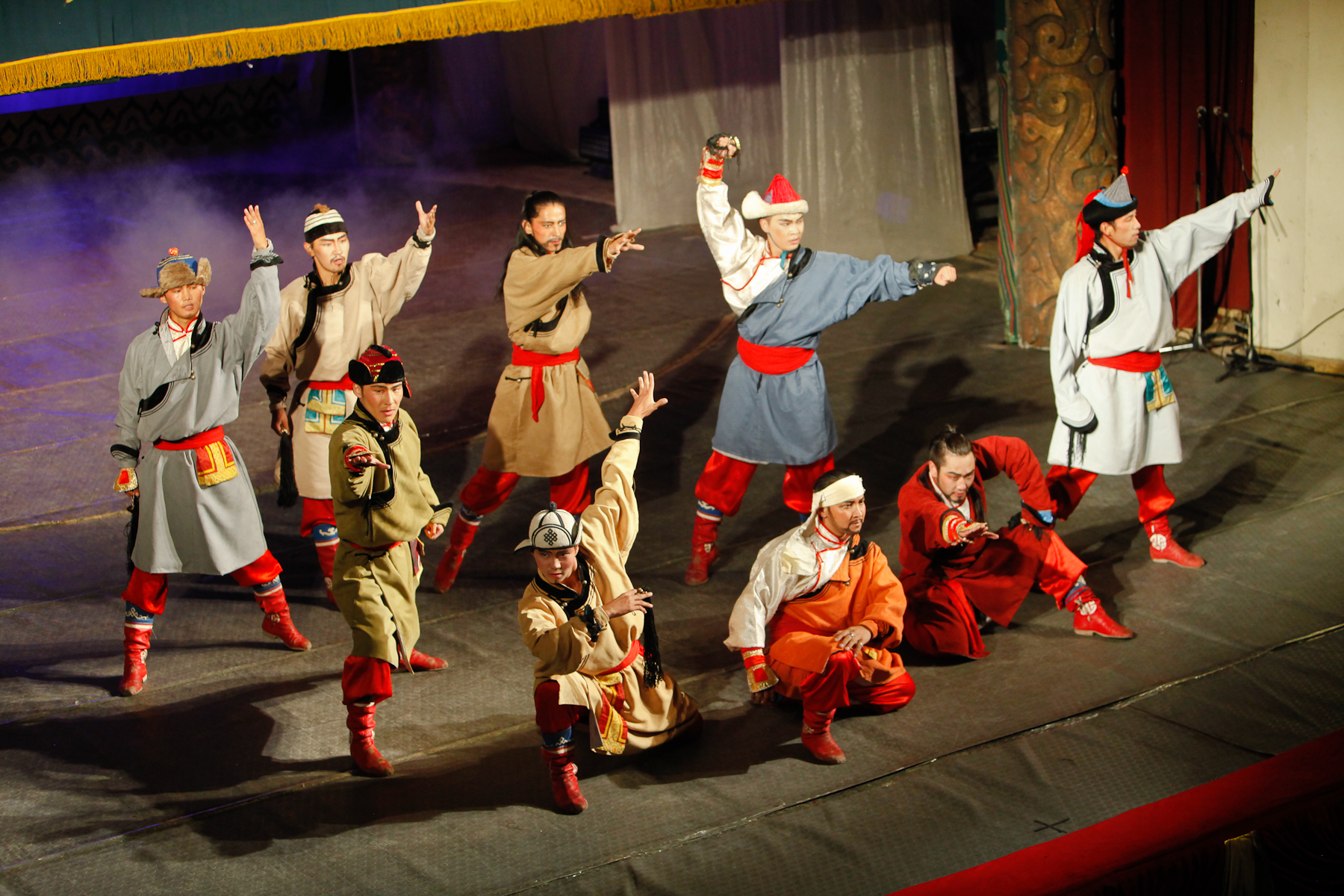
Mongolian National Song and Dance Academic Ensemble

Ulaanbaatar features a mix of traditional and western-style theatres, offering world-class performances. Many of the traditional folklore bands play regularly around the world, including in New York, London and Tokyo. The Ulaanbaatar Opera House, situated in the centre of the city, hosts concerts and musical performances as well as opera and ballet performances, some in collaboration with world ballet houses such as the Boston Theatre.

The Mongolian State Grand National Orchestra was established in 1945. It has the largest orchestra of traditional instruments in the country, with a repertoire going beyond national music, encompassing dozens of international musical pieces.

The Tumen Ekh Ensemble comprises artists who perform all types of Mongolian song, music and dance. They play traditional instruments, including the morin khuur (horsehead fiddle), and perform Mongolian long song, epic and eulogy songs, a shaman ritual dance, an ancient palace dance and a Tsam mask dance.

The Morin Khuur Ensemble of Mongolia is part of the Mongolian State Philharmonic, based at Central Cultural Palace. It is a popular ensemble featuring the national string instrument, the morin khuur, and performs various domestic and international works.

=== Religious establishments ===
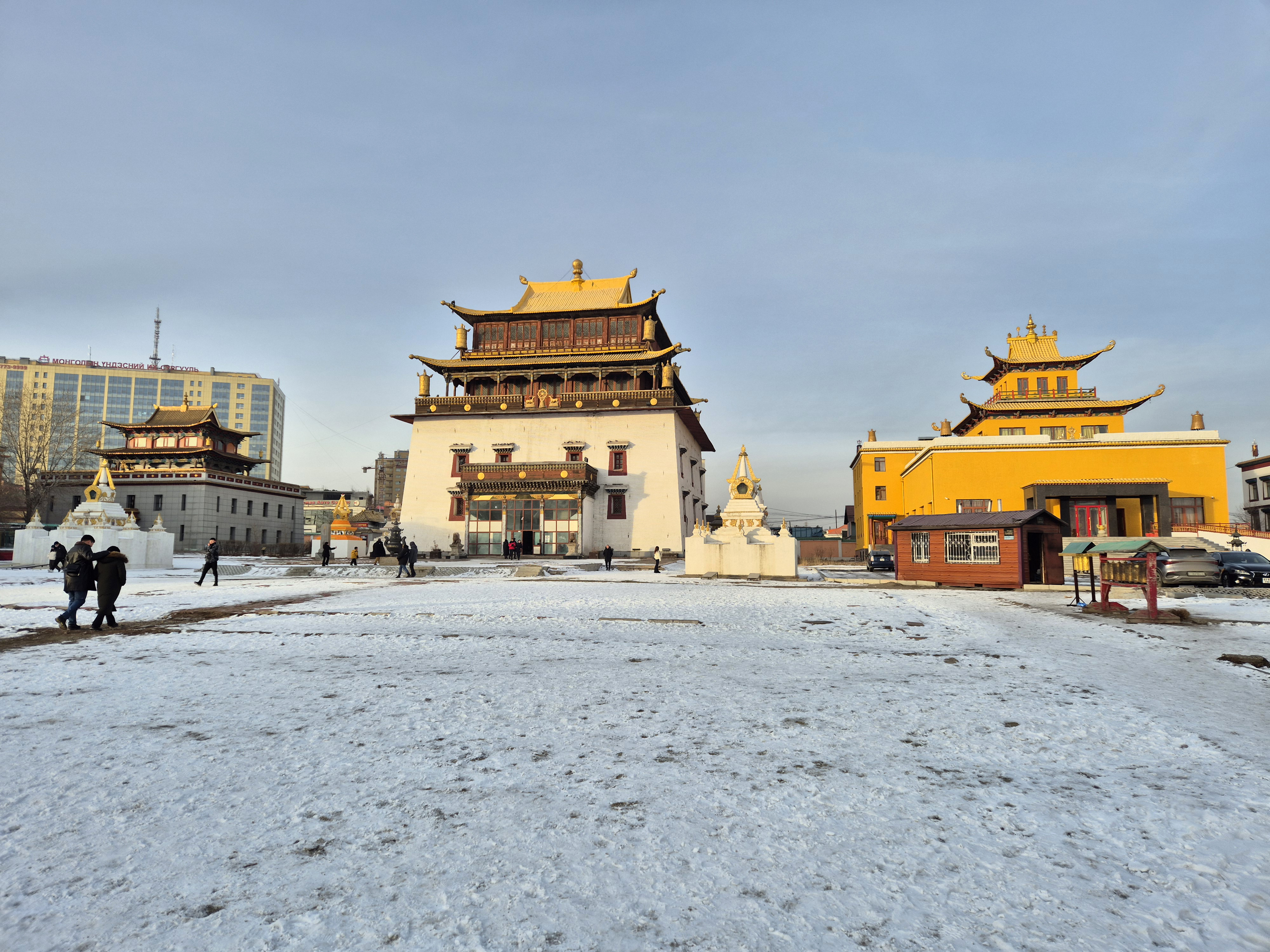
Gandantegchinlen Monastery

Among the notable older monasteries is the Choijin Lama Monastery, a Buddhist monastery that was completed in 1908. It escaped the destruction of Mongolian monasteries when it was turned into a museum in 1942.

Another is the Gandan Monastery, which dates to the 19th century. Its most famous attraction is a 26.5-meter-high golden statue of Migjid Janraisig. These monasteries are among the very few in Mongolia to have escaped the wholesale destruction of Mongolian monasteries under Khorloogiin Choibalsan.

The House of Mercy is a Catholic-run mission which provides shelter and resources for the poor and homeless of the city. The facility was visited by Pope Francis during a pastoral tour of Mongolia in 2023.

=== Museums ===
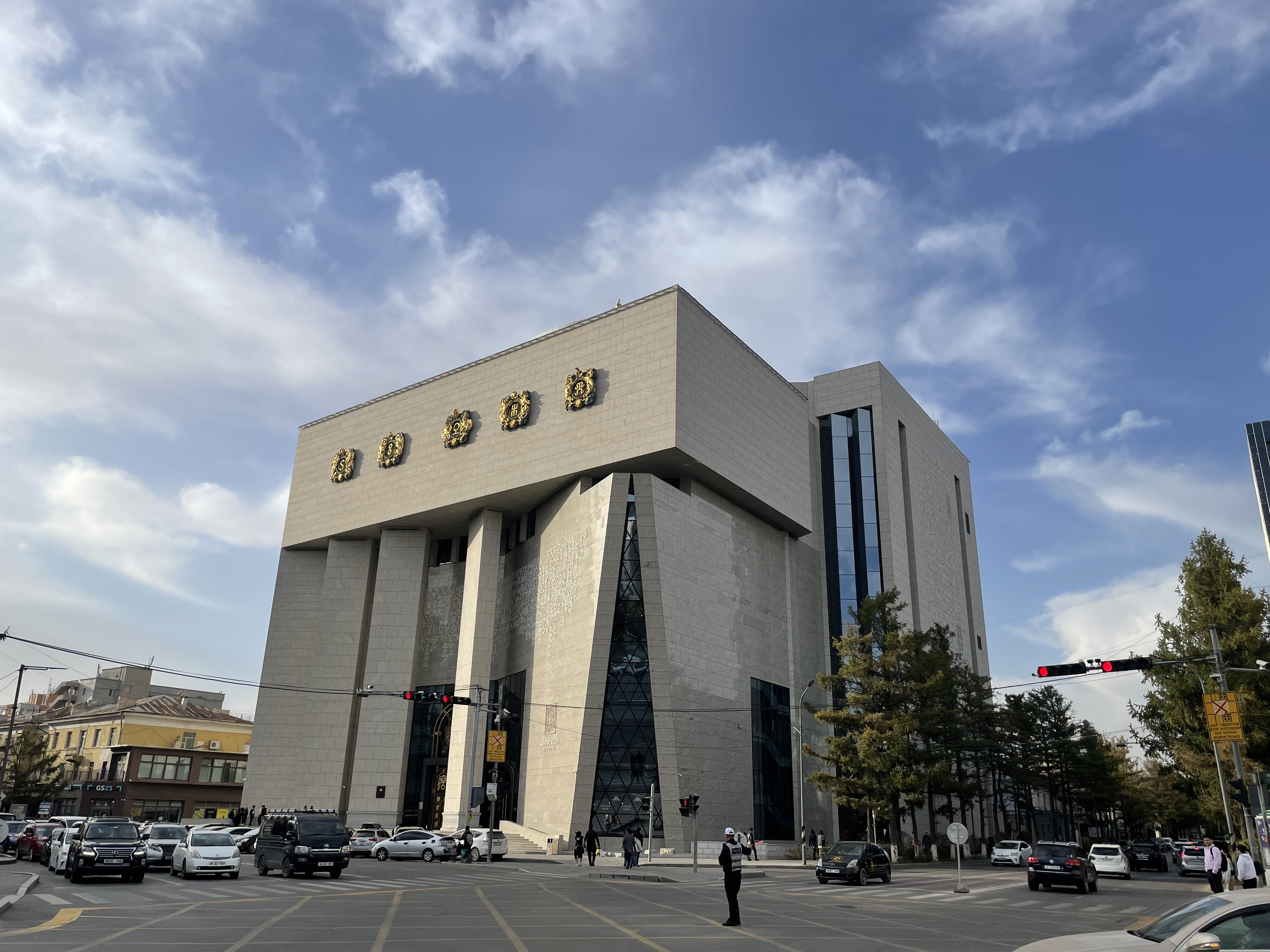
Chinggis Khaan National Museum

Ulaanbaatar has several museums dedicated to Mongolian history and culture. The Mongolian Natural History Museum features many dinosaur fossils and meteorites found in Mongolia.

The National Museum of Mongolia includes exhibits from prehistoric times through the Mongol Empire to the present. The Zanabazar Museum of Fine Arts has a large collection of Mongolian art, including works of the 17th-century sculptor/artist Zanabazar, as well as Mongolia's most famous painting, One Day In Mongolia by Baldugiin "Marzan" Sharav. The Mongolian Theatre Museum presents the history of the performing arts in Mongolia.

Pre-1778 artifacts that have never left the city since its founding include the Vajradhara statue made by Zanabazar himself in 1683 (the city's main deity, kept at the Vajradhara temple); an ornate throne presented to Zanabazar by the Kangxi Emperor (before 1723); a sandalwood hat presented to Zanabazar by the Dalai Lama (c. 1663); Zanabazar's large fur coat, also presented by the Kangxi Emperor; and a great number of original statues made by Zanabazar (e.g., the Green Tara).

The Mongolian Military Museum features two permanent exhibition halls, commemorating the war history of the country from prehistoric times to the modern era. In the first hall, one can see various tools and weapons from the Paleolithic age to the times of the Manchu empire. The second hall showcases the modern history of the Mongolian military, from the Bogd Khan period (1911–1924) up until Mongolia's recent military involvement in peacekeeping operations.

The Ulaanbaatar City Museum offers a view of Ulaanbaatar's history through old maps and photos. Among the permanent items is a huge painting of the capital as it looked in 1912, showing major landmarks such as Gandan Monastery and the Green Palace. Part of the museum is dedicated to special photo exhibits that change frequently. The Mongolian Railway History Museum is an open-air museum that displays six types of locomotives used during a 65-year period of Mongolian rail history.

The International Intellectual Museum displays a comprehensive collection of complex wooden toys that visitors can assemble.

The Memorial Museum of Victims of Political Repression – dedicated to those fallen under the Communist purge that took the lives of over 32,000 statesmen, herders, scholars, politicians and lamas in the 1930s – told about one of the most tragic periods in Mongolia's 20th-century history. The small building had fallen into serious disrepair and was demolished on 7 October 2019, despite public outcry in favor of renovation.

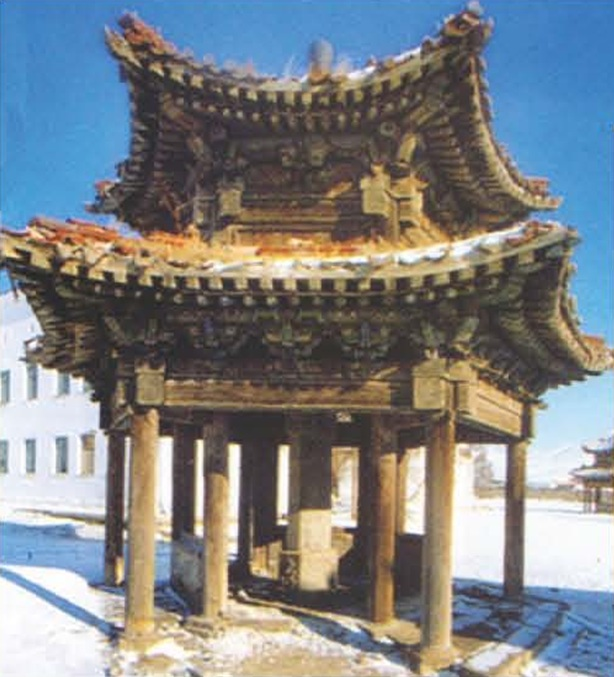
A building of the Dambadarjaalin Monastery (1765) in Sukhbaatar District

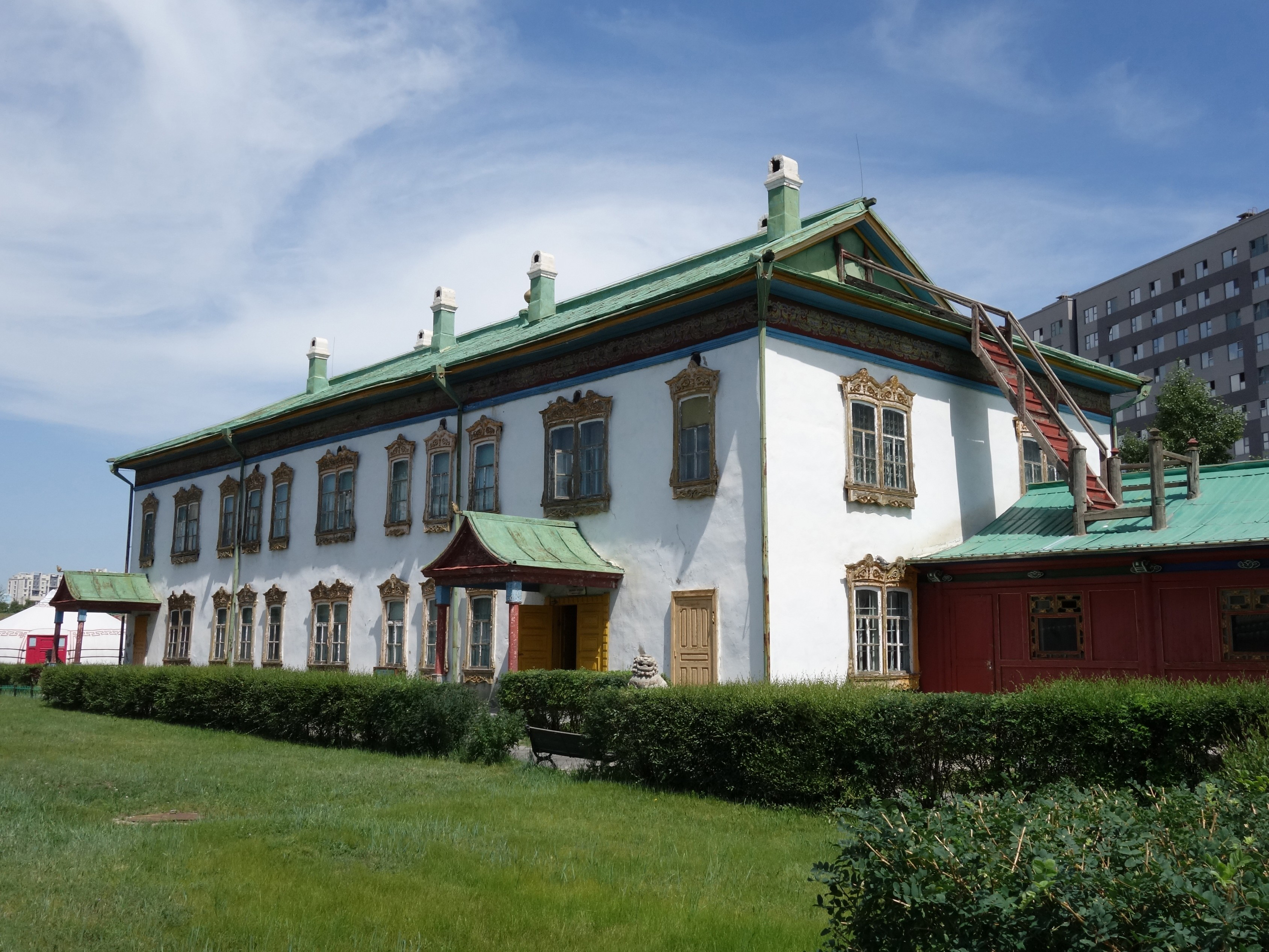
Winter residence of the Bogd Gegeen, built in 1903, designed under Tsar Nicholas II

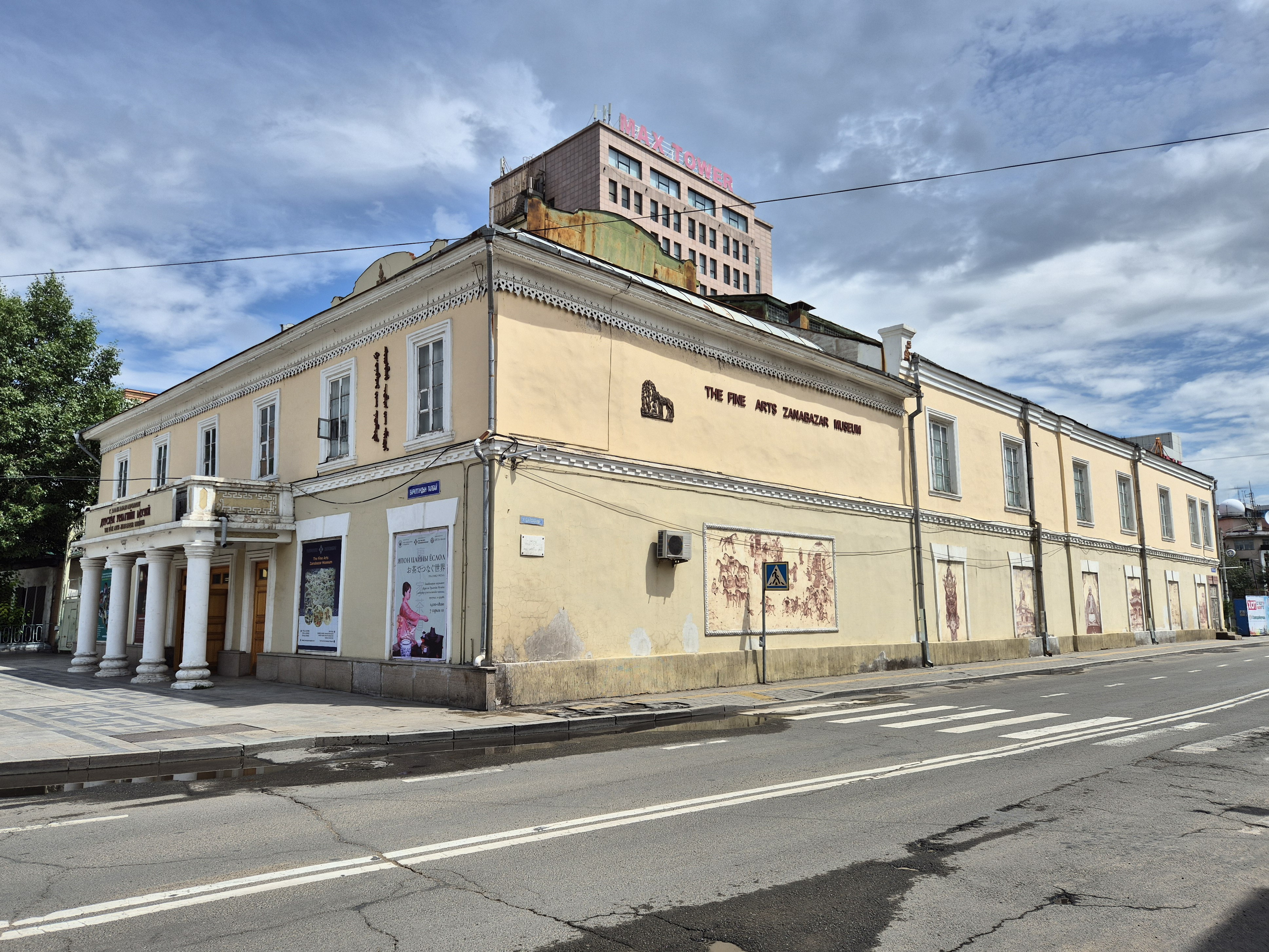
Zanabazar's Fine Arts Museum, built in 1905 by Russian merchant Gudvintsal as a trading shop

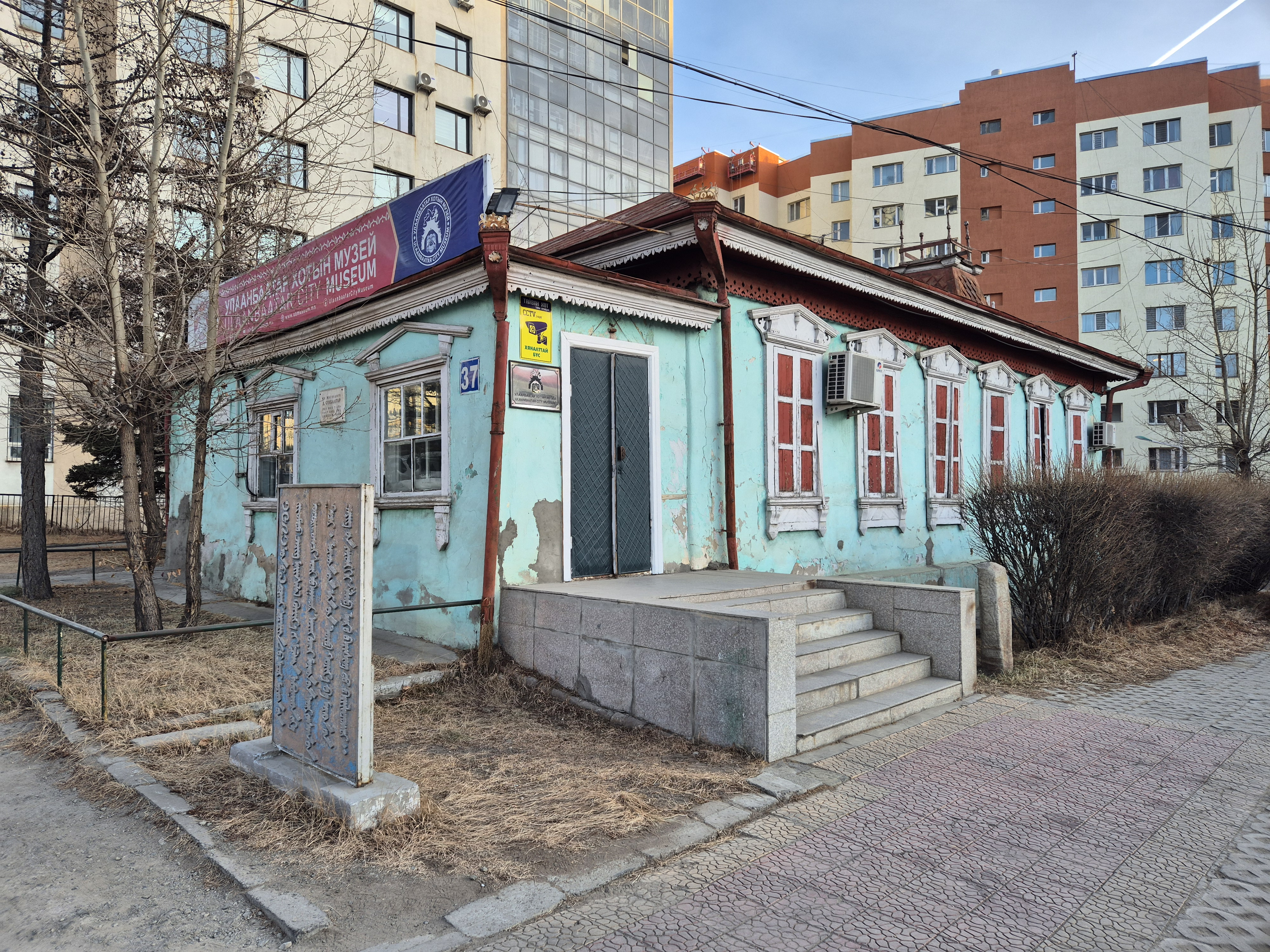
Ulaanbaatar City Museum, built in 1904 by a Buryat-Mongol merchant

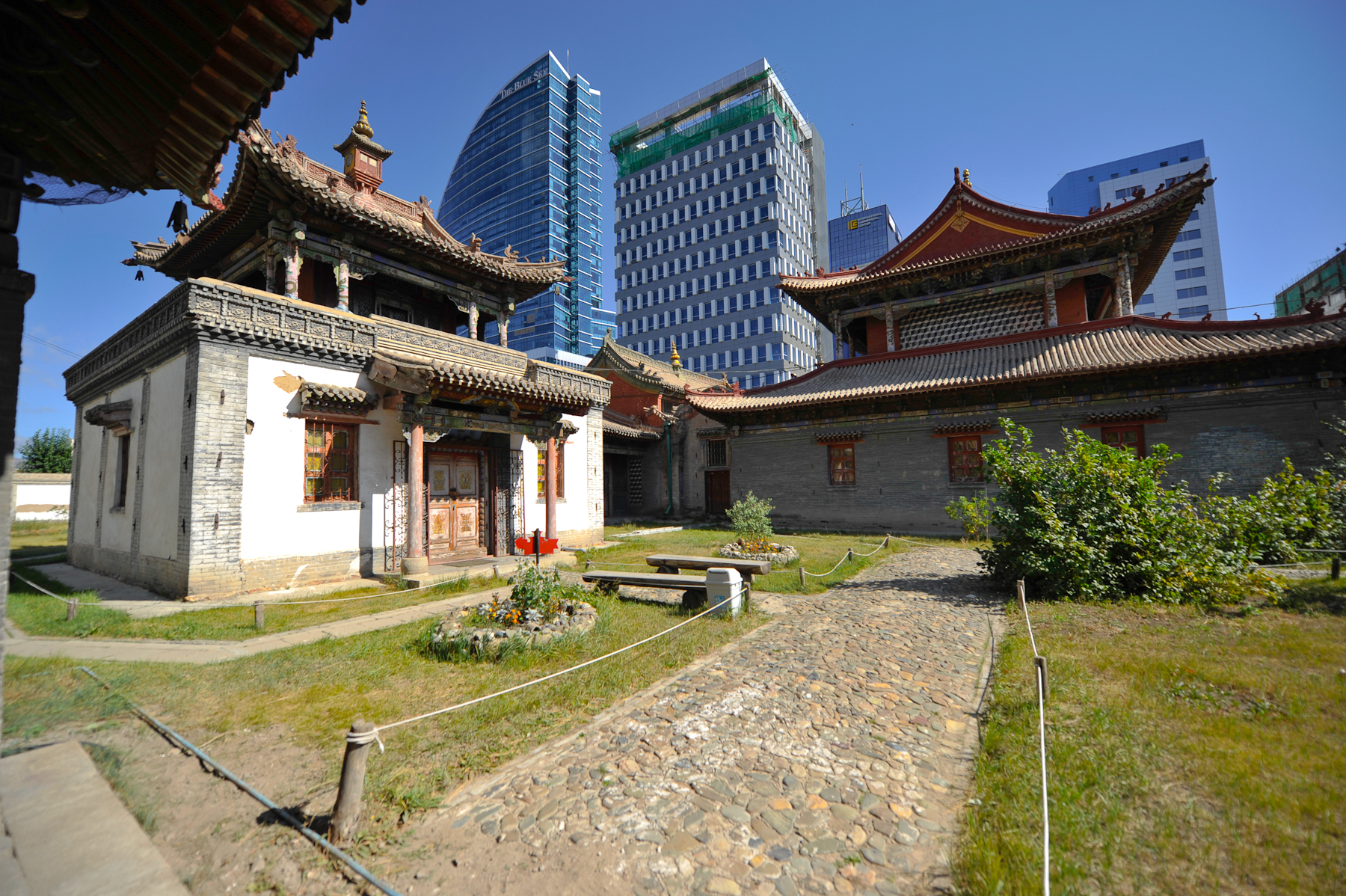
Choijin Lama Temple complex, built in 1904–1908

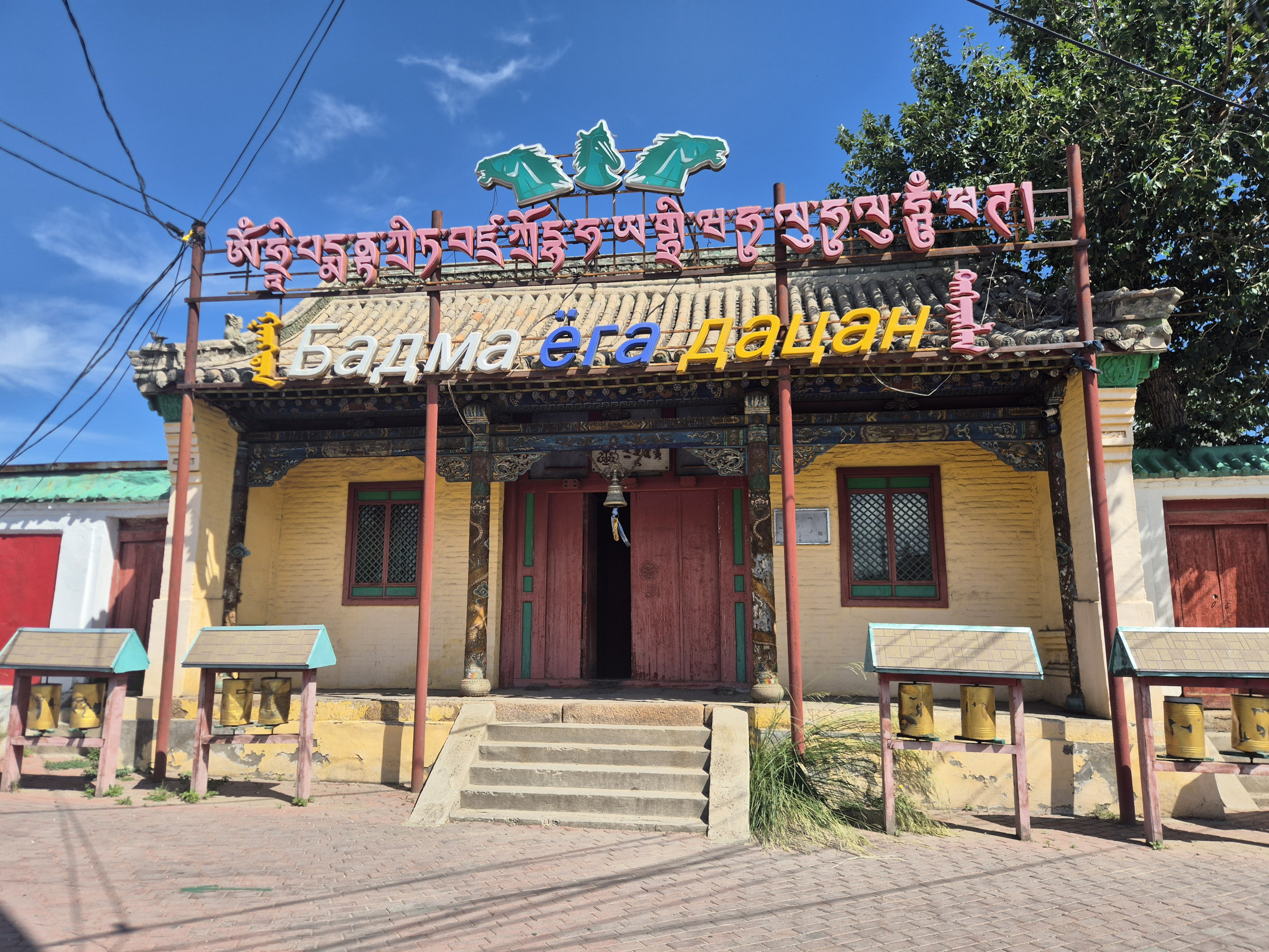
West Geser Temple, built in 1919–1920 by Guve Ovogt Zakhar

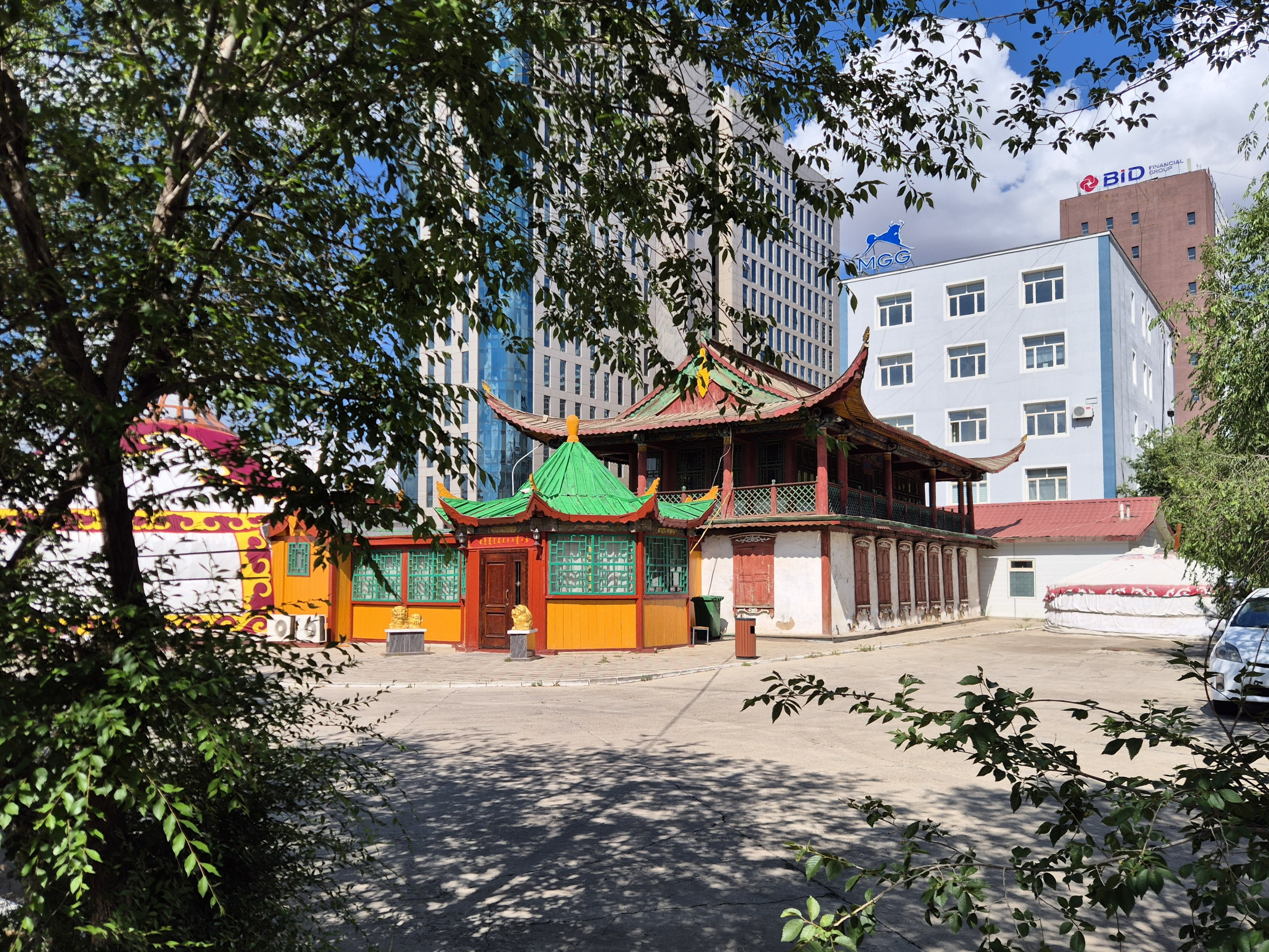
Residence of Prince Chin Wang Khanddorj (Minister of Foreign Affairs), built in 1913

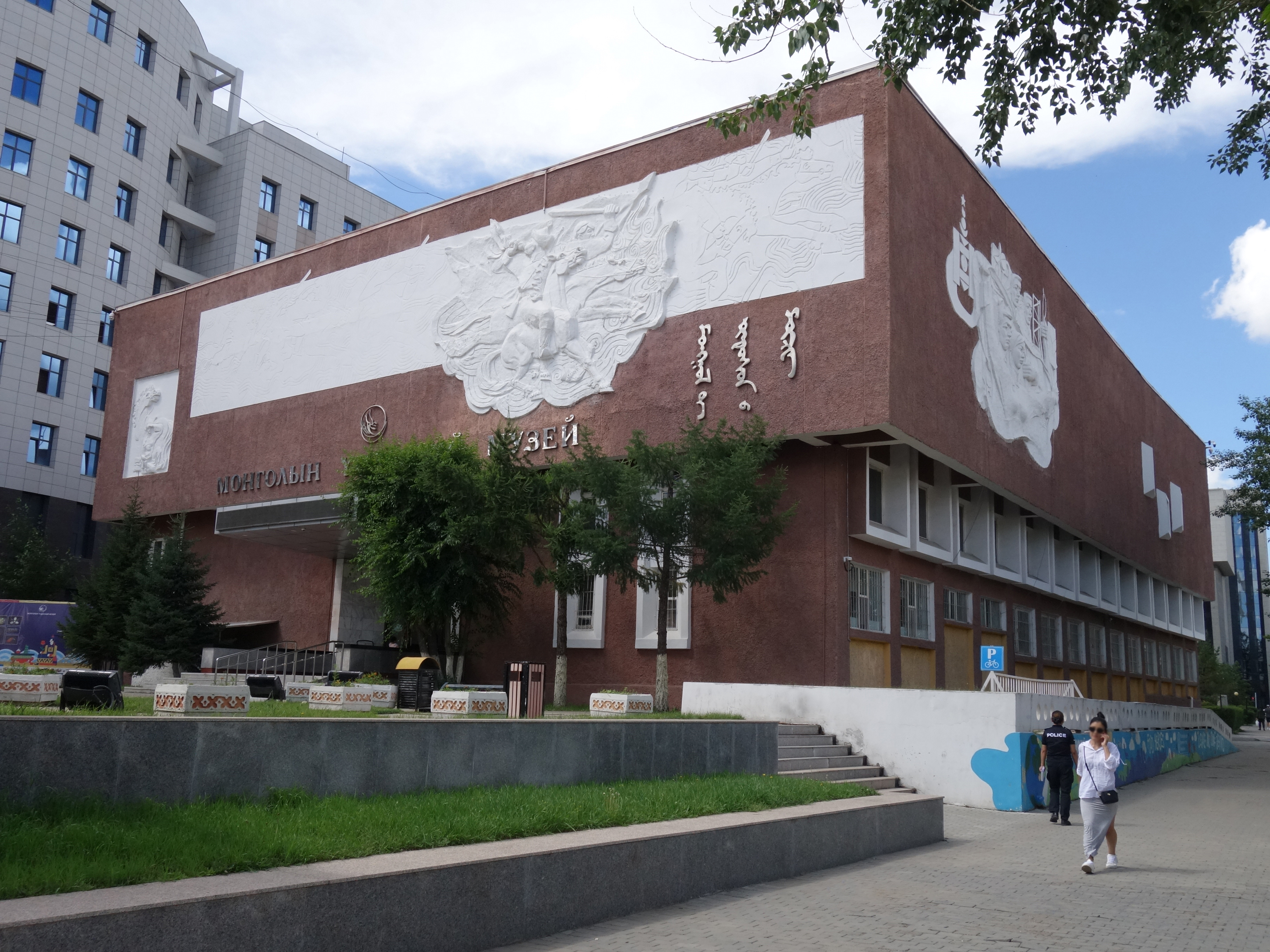
National Museum of Mongolia

== Education ==
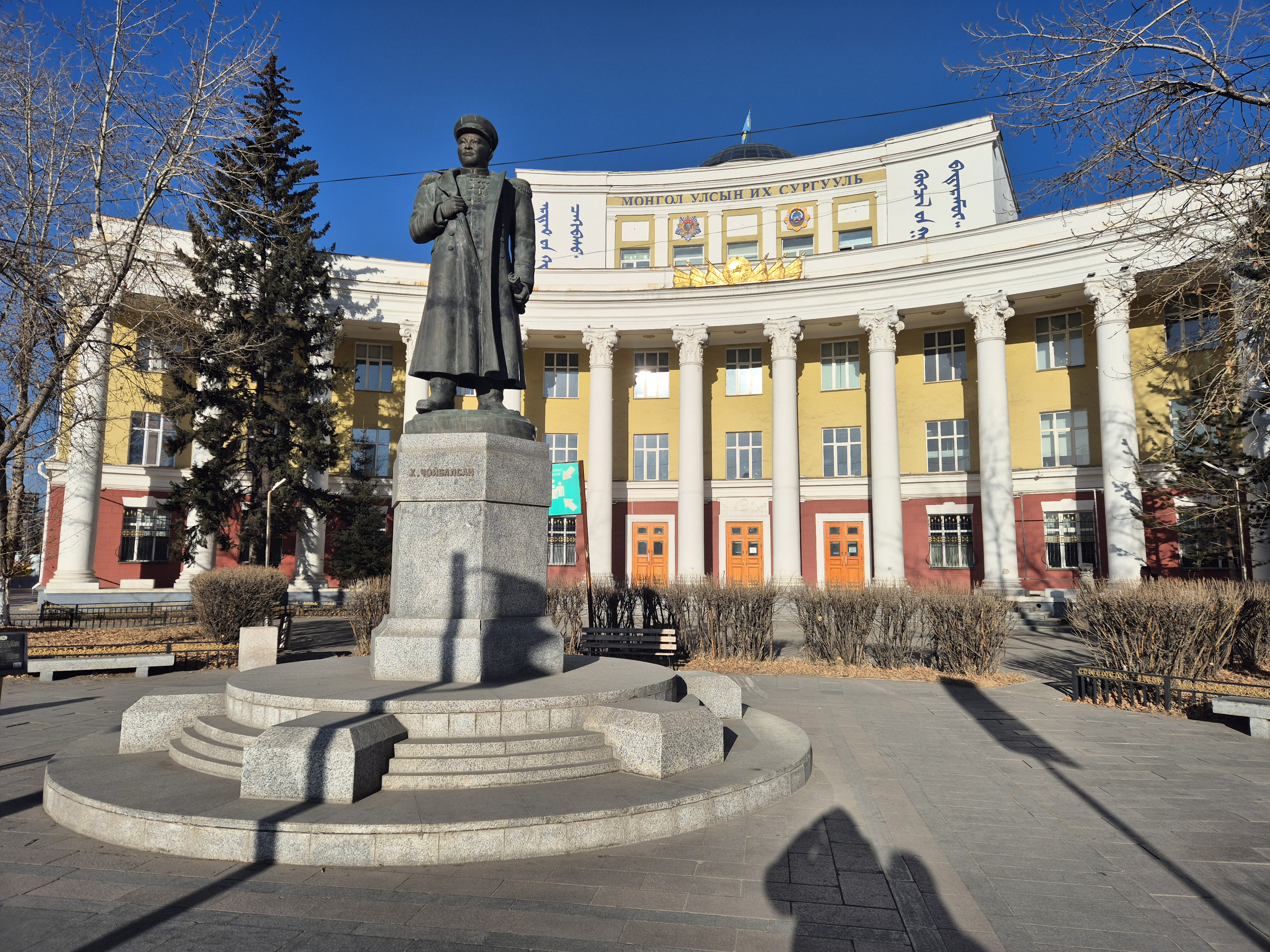
Main building of the National University of Mongolia

Ulaanbaatar is home to most of Mongolia's major universities, among them the National University of Mongolia, Mongolian University of Science and Technology, Mongolian University of Life Sciences, Mongolian National University of Medical Sciences, Mongolian National University of Education, Mongolian State University of Arts and Culture and the University of Finance and Economics.

The American School of Ulaanbaatar and the International School of Ulaanbaatar are examples of Western-style K-12 education in English for Mongolian nationals and foreign residents.

=== Libraries ===
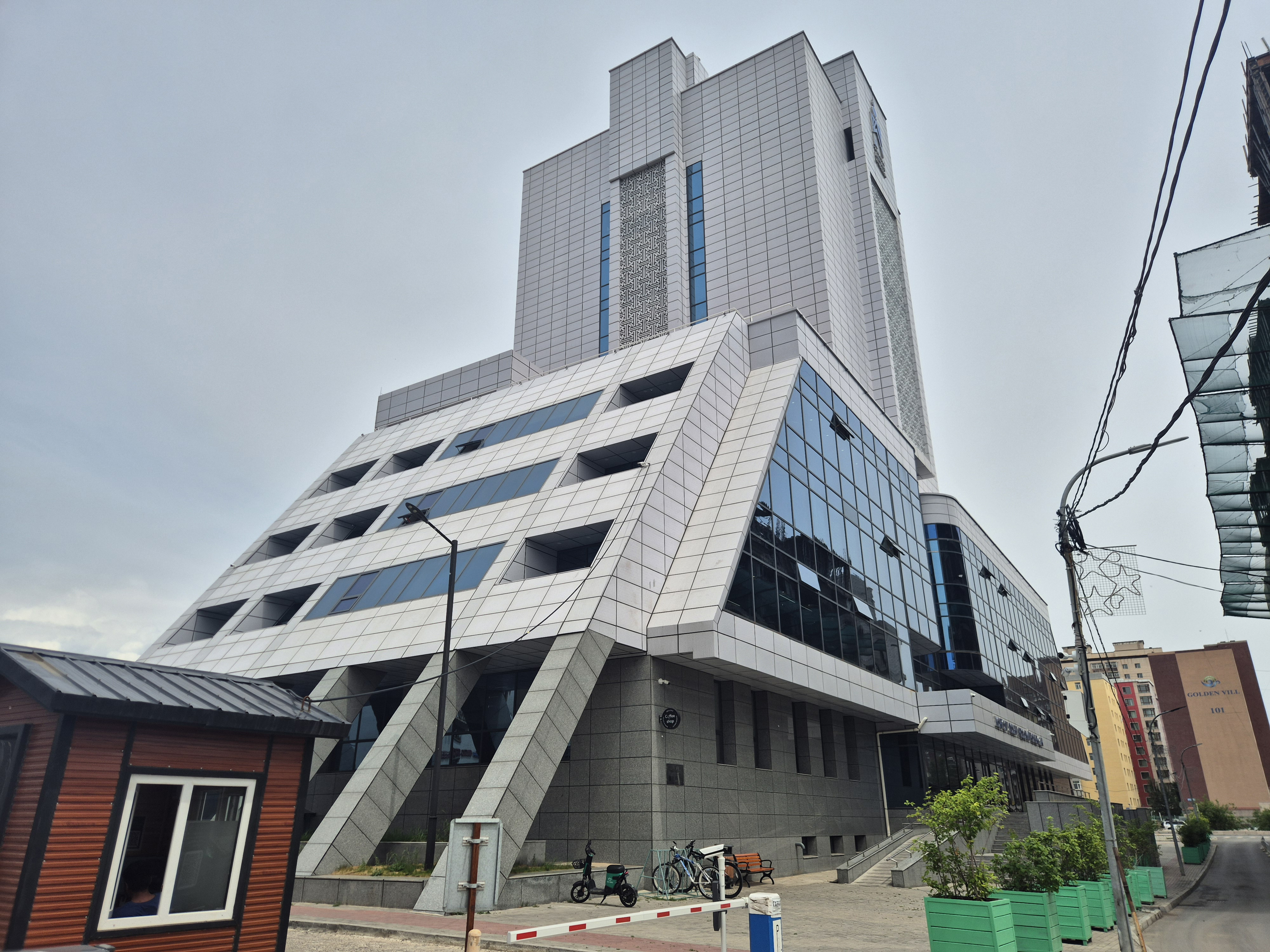
National Library of Mongolia

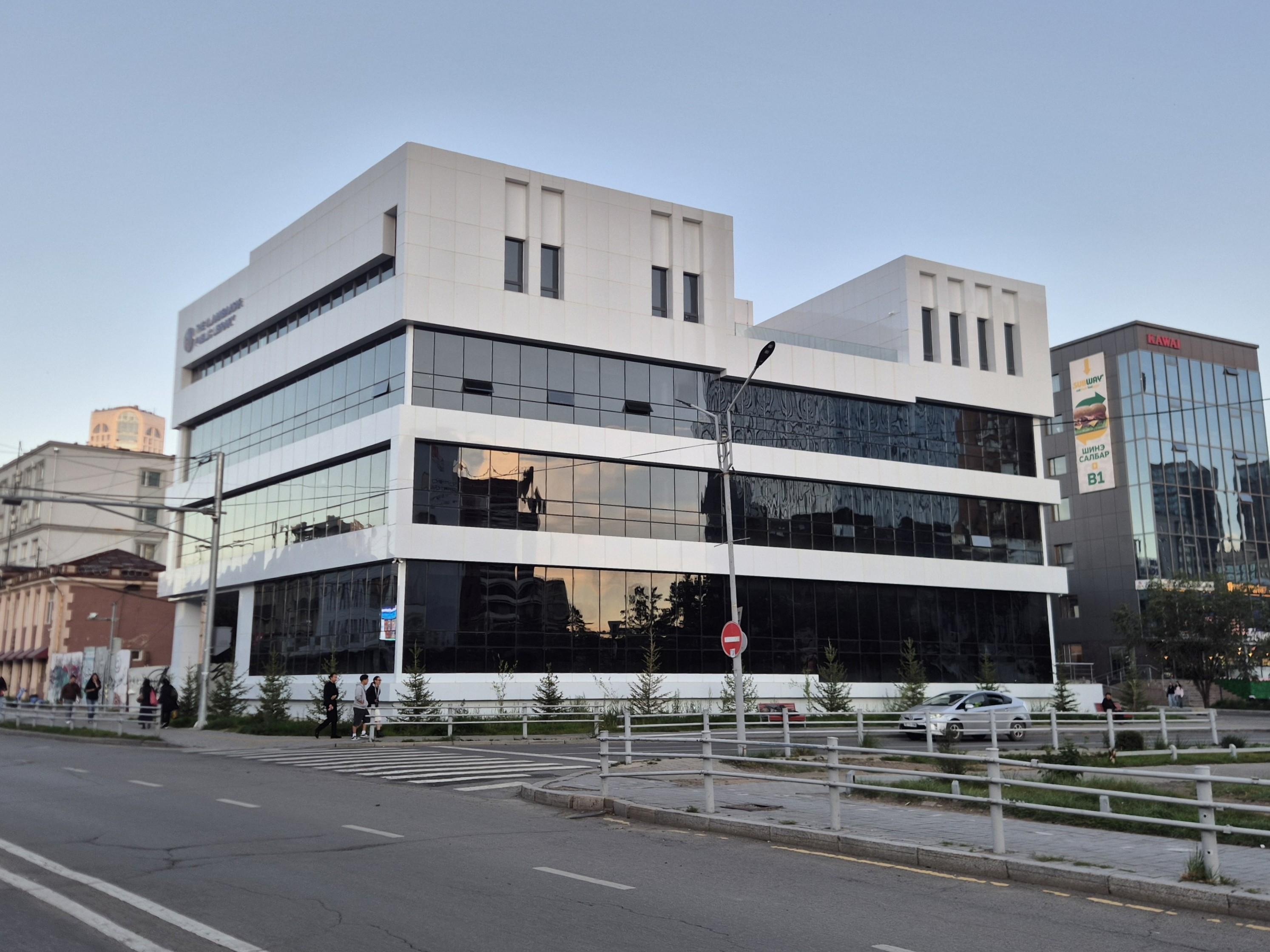
Ulaanbaatar Public Library

The National Library of Mongolia is located in Ulaanbaatar and includes an extensive historical collection, items in non-Mongolian languages and a special children's collection.

The Metropolitan Central Library of Ulaanbaatar, sometimes also referred to as the Ulaanbaatar Public Library, is a public library with a collection of about 500,000 items. It has 232,097 annual users and a total of 497,298 loans per year. It does charge users a registration fee of 3800 to 4250 tugrik, or about US$1.06 to $1.18. The fees may be the result of operating on a budget under $176,000 per year. They also host websites on classical and modern Mongolian literature and food, in addition to providing free internet access.

In 1986, the Ulaanbaatar government created a centralized system for all public libraries in the city, known as the Metropolitan Library System of Ulaanbaatar (MLSU). This system coordinates management, acquisitions, finances and policy among public libraries in the capital, in addition to providing support to school and children's libraries. Other than the Metropolitan Central Library, the MLSU has four branch libraries. They are in Chingeltei District (established in 1946), Khan-Uul District (established in 1948), Bayanzurkh District (established in 1968) and Songino-Khairkhan District (established in 1991). There is also a Children's Central Library, which was established in 1979.

=== University libraries ===
- Library of Mongolian State University of Education
- Library of the Academy of Management
- Library of the National University of Mongolia
- Institutes of the Academy of Sciences (3 department libraries)
- Library of the Institute of Language and Literature
- Library of the Institute of History
- Library of the Institute of Finance and Economics
- Library of the National University of Mongolia
- Library of the Agriculture University

=== Digital libraries ===
Large book sales at Sükhbaatar Square during the annual Ulaanbaatar Book Fair, September 2023

The Press Institute in Ulaanbaatar oversees the Digital Archive of Mongolian Newspapers. It is a collection of 45 newspaper titles with a particular focus on the years after the fall of communism in Mongolia. The project was supported by the British Library's Endangered Archives Programme. The Metropolitan Central Library in Ulaanbaatar maintains a digital monthly news archive.

=== Special libraries ===
Ulaanbaatar Book Fair is organized at Sükhbaatar Square every year in May and September. Held first in 2007, the book fair is one of the country's major book culture and literary events, attracting over 300 book authors and 200 publishing houses. The book festival has also became an important platform for promoting literature, the publishing industry and book culture among Mongolia's younger generation.

In 2023, the National University of Mongolia launched a library with audiobooks for their students with disabilities. The library is reserved exclusively for those people.

The American Center for Mongolian Studies (ACMS) operates a research library with 1,500 volumes related to Mongolia in numerous languages. It also hosts an online library that includes special reference resources and access to digital databases, including a digital book collection.

There is a Speaking Library at School #116 for the visually impaired, funded by the Zorig Foundation, and the collection is largely based on materials donated by Mongolian National Radio.

The Mongolia-Japan Center for Human Resources Development maintains a library in Ulaanbaatar consisting of about 7,800 items, with a strong focus on both aiding Mongolians studying Japanese and books in Japanese about Mongolia.

== Sport ==
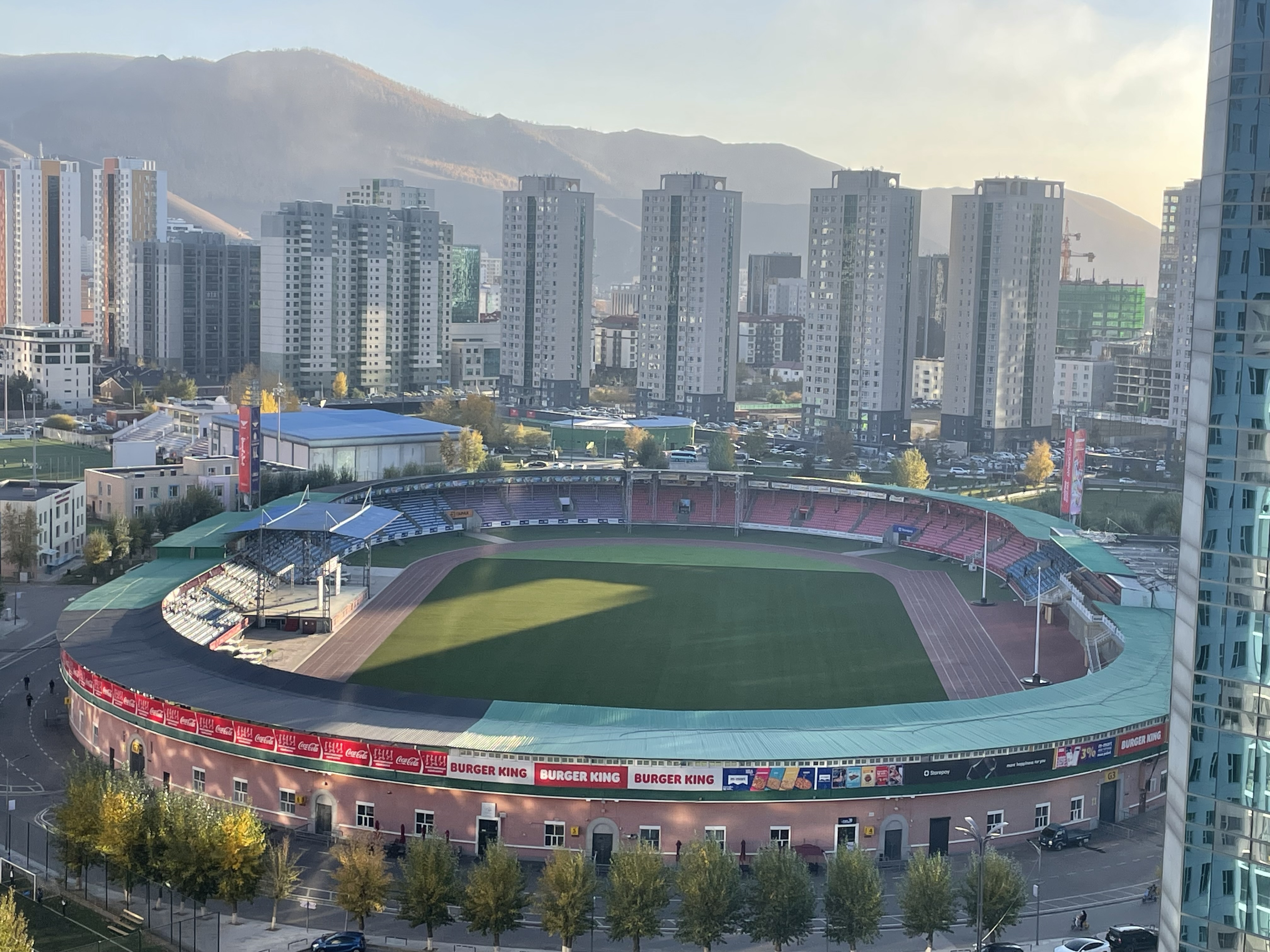
National Sports Stadium in 2025

The National Sports Stadium is the main sporting venue, notable as the host of the yearly Naadam festival. Other venues include the multi-purpose Buyant Ukhaa Sport Palace, AIC Steppe Arena for indoor skating, and Bökhiin Örgöö for Mongolian wrestling. Sky Resort is a popular destination for skiing and features a golf course.

Ulaanbaatar has previously hosted the 2019 FIBA 3x3 U18 World Cup the 2023 East Asian Youth Games, and the FIBA 3x3 Asia Cup. Since 2014, the city has annually held Ulaanbaatar Marathon, the largest mass-participation sporting event in the country. The marathon coincides with the city's car-free day.

All Mongolian Premier League football teams play at the MFF Football Centre in Ulaanbataar, even those that don't represent Ulaanbataar.

== Infrastructure ==
=== Transport ===
Ulaanbaatar serves as the country's primary road, air, and rail hub. Transport within Ulaanbaatar is conducted through private cars, public transport (buses, trolleybuses, and taxis), as well as informal taxis and minivans. As of 2021, the total number of registered vehicles in the city was 662,644.

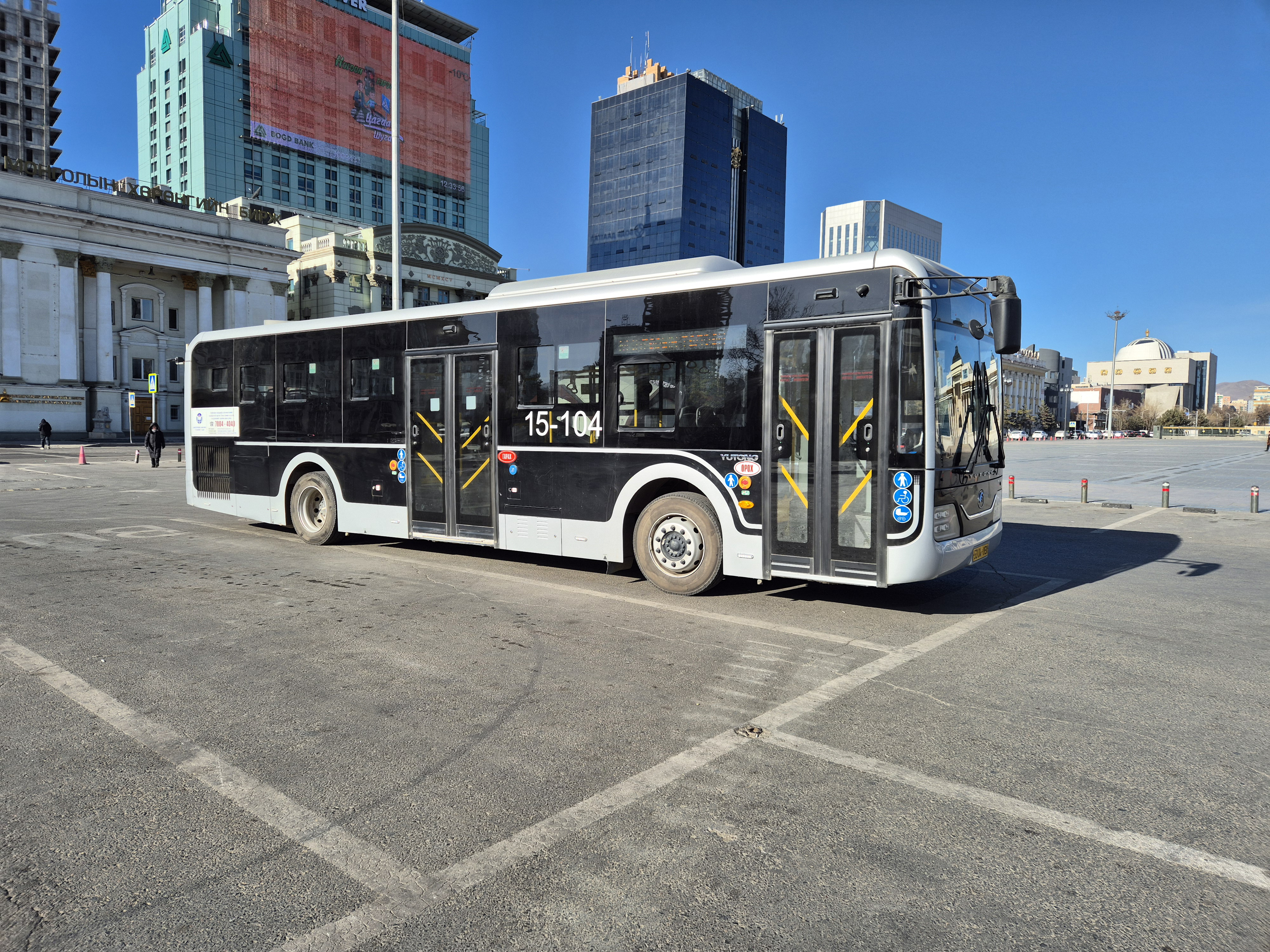
Public transport bus in Ulaanbaatar

==== Public transport ====
Buses are the main form of public transport in Ulaanbaatar. As of 2021, 950 buses from 19 companies served 105 routes and 1169 bus stops. Daily ridership is 480,000–500,000. The bus fleet consists of 18 articulated buses, 1129 high-capacity buses, 42 trolleybuses, 46 medium-capacity buses, and 46 small-capacity buses.

In 2021, public transport usage totaled 147 million passengers, with 61% of the population using public transport.

In July 2015, a smart card system was rolled out for bus fare payments (U Money); previously the bus network had conductors from which tickets would be bought using cash. As of 2025, fares are 200₮ for children and 1,000₮ for adults.

Eight companies operate 372 official taxis within the city as of 2021, down from 566 official taxis in 2019. Usage of unofficial taxis and ride-sharing apps (UBCab) is common.

==== Road ====
As of 2024, the city had 1253 km of paved roads, and its periphery (ger districts) are disproportionally underserved by paved roads. 720,000 vehicles were registered in the city as of 2023.

The city's traffic is concentrated around its main thoroughfares — Peace Avenue (Enkh Taivny örgön chölöö), Ikh Toiruu, Narnii Zam, and Chinggis Avenue (Chinggisiin örgön chölöö).

Congestion is a major problem in Ulaanbaatar, with average peak hour driving speeds in the city being 8.9 km/h in 2021. In the same year, city residents spent an average of 2.5 hours a day stuck in traffic. Recent studies predict rush hour speeds plummeting to just 5 km/h by 2025. Another major problem is flooding, with only 16% of paved roads having a drainage system.

==== Rail ====
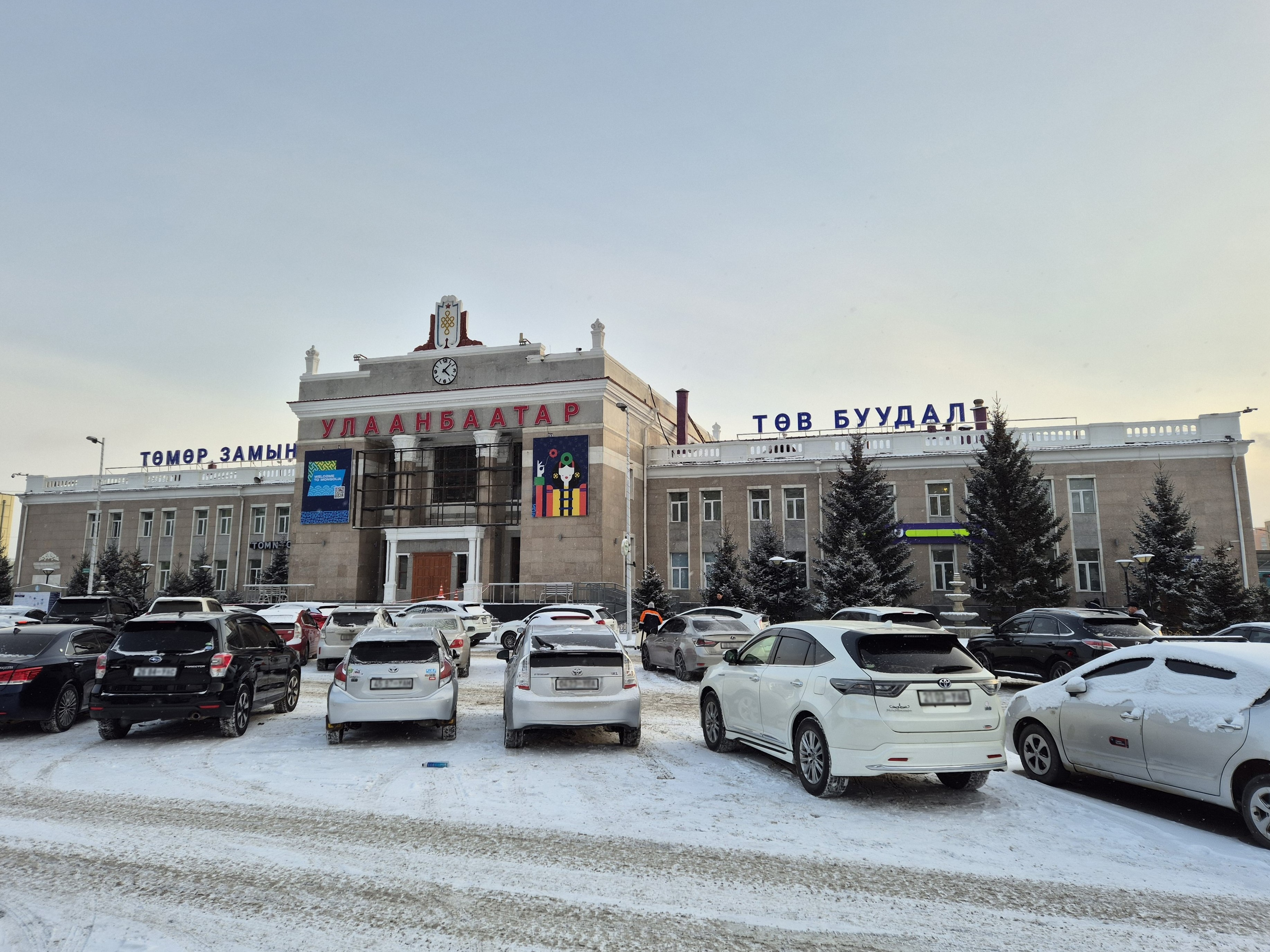
Ulaanbaatar railway station

The Trans-Mongolian Railway crosses the city centre in a roughly east-to-west direction, with the main railway hub being Ulaanbaatar railway station.

==== Air ====
Ulaanbaatar is served by Chinggis Khaan International Airport, located 52 km (32 mi) south of the city in Sergelen, Töv, which functions as the country's main air hub. It replaced the former Buyant-Ukhaa International Airport in 2021 and features flights to destinations in Europe, Asia, and domestic aimag centres. The airport is accessible from Ulaanbaatar via highway and Yarmag Bridge with taxis and shuttles operating along the route.

There are 6 helipads in the city.

==== Future proposals ====
Due to worsening congestion and growth, a number of proposals have been made to improve the city's transport infrastructure, such as the short-lived Ulaanbaatar Railbus, and the proposed subway system and tram. On 4 April 2024, the construction of the Ulaanbaatar Cable Car from Yaarma to the Kharkhorin bus station began. Ulaanbaatar is also building a 32 km long Tuul expressway to address the traffic congestion.

=== Energy ===
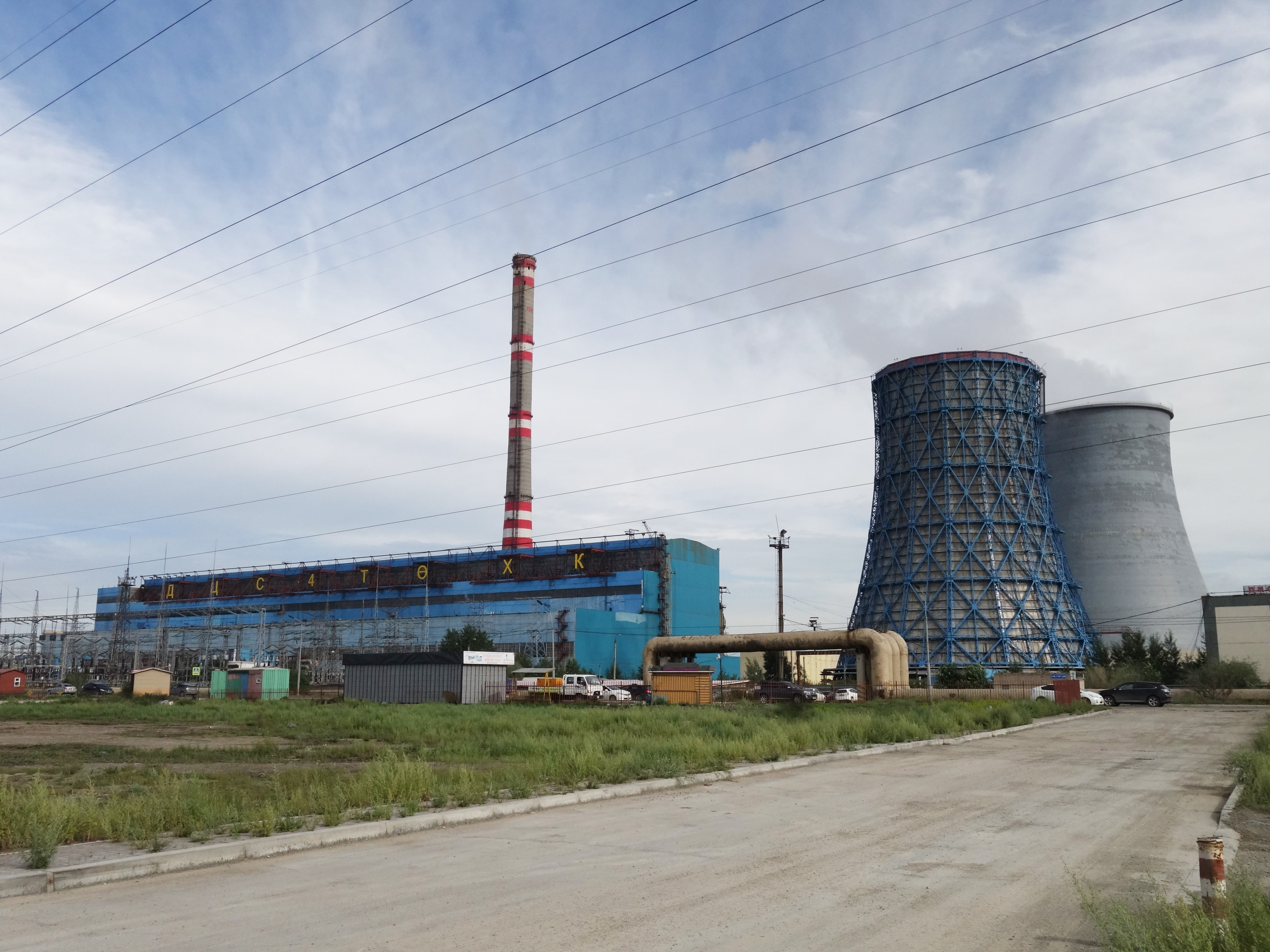
Thermal Power Plant No. 4

Ulaanbaatar's electricity is mainly supplied through its four thermal power plants utilizing coal, the largest being Thermal Power Plant No. 4. Aside from generating electricity, they also supply hot water throughout the city and heat buildings during the winter months from September to April. Ger districts surrounding the city are not connected to the central heating system, therefore having to rely on burning coal and other materials for heat.

In 2019, the government banned the burning of raw coal within Ulaanbaatar, instead distributing coke briquettes, claiming fuel efficiency and less smoke pollution. Results have been inconclusive since the switch to briquettes, though as of 2023 smoke is still a major concern in winter.

=== Water ===
Ulaanbaatar relies entirely on groundwater recharged directly from the Tuul River. Water provisioning is managed by the Water Supply and Sewage Authority, a municipal agency.

== Pollution ==
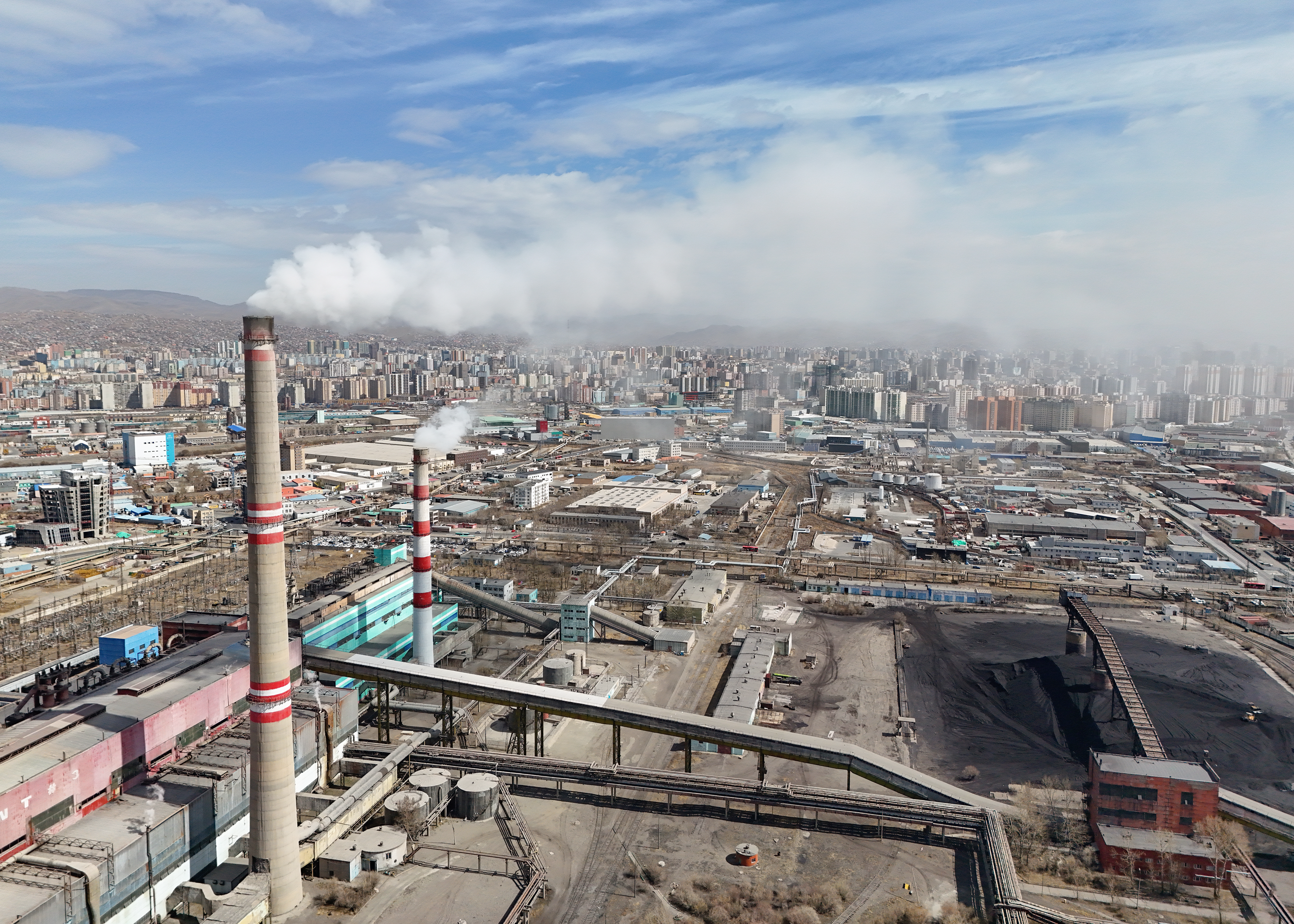
The No. 3 coal-fired power plant is one of the city's leading pollutants

Air pollution is a serious problem in Ulaanbaatar, especially in winter. Concentrations of certain types of particulates (PM10 and PM2.5) regularly exceed World Health Organization recommended maximum levels by more than a dozen times. They also exceed the concentrations measured in northern Chinese industrial cities. During the winter months, smoke regularly obscures vision, and even led to problems with air traffic at the former airport.

Sources of the pollution are mainly the simple stoves used for heating and cooking in the city's ger districts, but also the local coal-fueled power plants. Almost half of the city’s population lives in ger districts.

The problem is compounded by Ulaanbaatar's location in a valley between relatively high mountains, which shield the city from the winter winds and thus obstruct air circulation.

== Twin towns and sister cities ==
Ulaanbaatar is twinned with:

- Moscow, Russia (1957)
- Hohhot, China (1991)
- Bonn, Germany (1993)
- Seoul, South Korea (1995)
- Irkutsk, Russia (1998)
- (United States) Denver, USA (2001)
- Havana, Cuba (2002)
- Ankara, Turkey (2003)
- (United States) Oakland, USA (2006)
- Elista, Russia (2010)
- Gaziantep, Turkey (2010)
- Beijing, China (2014)
- Novosibirsk, Russia (2015)
- Ulan-Ude, Russia (2015)
- Incheon, South Korea (2017)
- Bangkok, Thailand (2017)
- Astana, Kazakhstan (2019)
- Chongqing, China (2022)
- Bishkek, Kyrgyzstan (2023)
- Ashgabat, Turkmenistan (2025)
