= Mongol Aspiration School =

Public school in Bayanzürkh, Ulaanbaatar, Mongolia

Coordinates: 47°54′16.7″N 106°58′54.2″E

Mongol Aspiration International School
- Нийслэлийн ерөнхий боловсролын Монгол тэмүүлэл сургууль
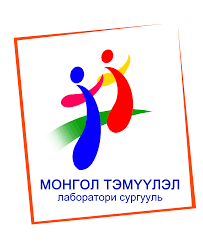
- Logo of Mongol Aspiration School
- Ulaanbaatar, Mongolia

Information
- School type: Public international school
- Motto: Providing quality education and preparing global citizens
- Established: 2011
- Sister school: New Era, New Beginning
- Principal: Tumurchudur Dugerragchaa
- Headmistress: Oyunchimeg Ayurzana
- Grades: 9-12th grade
- Age range: 14-18
- Average class size: 24 students
- Education system: Cambridge International Education; Mongolian General Education
- Song: Song of Mongol Aspiration School
- Website: mongolaspiration.edu.mn

Mongol Aspiration International School (MAIS; Mongolian: Монгол тэмүүлэл сургууль) is a state-funded international school, offering Cambridge International Education in Bayanzürkh, Ulaanbaatar, Mongolia. Founded in 2011, it is one of the three International Laboratory Schools owned by the Ministry of Education.

== History ==
After the Democratic Revolution of 1990, Mongolia had seen numerous educational reforms with help from international charities and organisations. Nevertheless, lack of consistency, acquaintance, and investment caused a severe harm to the educational system; beginning in the mid-2000s, many higher education institutions started reporting significantly lower academic performances, further demanding the government to urgently update its current education policies. Moreover, due to its absence of recognition, undergraduate applicants for foreign universities encountered various difficulties, which could have serious consequences in the country's development in the long term.

In 2011, the Ministry of Education announced its collaboration with the University of Cambridge to implement the new international education system. As a result of the agreement, the Ministry appointed 44 secondary schools to be laboratory schools where the new system would be tested and improved, and established 3 public international schools with Cambridge International Education, Mongol Aspiration being one of them. Soon, Mongol Aspiration became an official Cambridge International Examinations center in 2012.

== Enrollment ==
To ensure equality, Mongol Aspiration announces an enrollment examination for Grade 8 students nationwide every year. The examination includes English, Mathematics, Physics, Biology, and Chemistry(added since 2023) tests, and the top 96 students are invited to the school. Previously, the examination was organized by the Education Evaluation Centre alongside that of two other sister schools, but in 2016, the schools were given the right to organize it by themselves. A delegation from the Independent Authority Against Corruption of Mongolia oversees the enrollment process. Approximately 1000 students take the annual entrance examination.

== Education ==
Mongol Aspiration offers Cambridge International GCE, AS and A Levels from Grade 9 to Grade 12. Grade 9 students can choose one humanities, one foreign language, and one creative subject, whereas Additional Mathematics, English (Only FLE), Physics, Chemistry, and Biology are mandatory to meet the criteria for the Cambridge ICE diploma. Consulting services are also provided to its students, as it is a UCAS authorised centre.

== Location ==
During its first 5 years, Mongol Aspiration was located on the 3rd floor of the 115th secondary school building in Khan-Uul district. Although the government had allocated a budget for a new building, difficulties with land availability delayed construction several times. In 2017, the school finally moved into its own building near the National Park in Bayanzürkh district. The 133rd secondary school was also located on the first and second floors of the building temporarily until it had its own building. However, the land rights for the building were stalled in court due to a land dispute between a private real estate developer and the government, which had decided to allocate 6.6 billion MNT from the budget for the construction.

In October 2019, to reduce the workload caused by primary and secondary students at the 133rd school, Mongol Aspiration was forced to move from its own building to the 1st building of the National University of Commerce and Business (NUCM) in Sükhbaatar district. Subsequently, a series of protests and press conferences against the decision were organized by the students' parents. Without official ownership, the school rented the NUCM building.

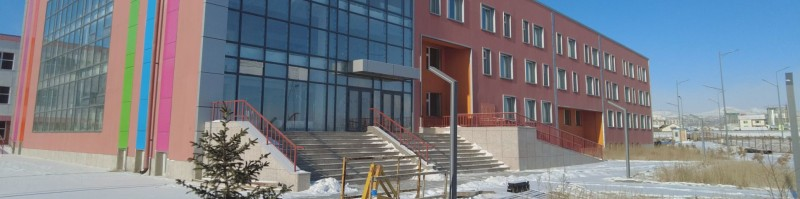
Building of Mongol Aspiration School since 2023, located in Bayanzürkh district

In 2020, construction for Mongol Aspiration's new building in Bayanzürkh, 2.3km east of its first building, began. The building was completed in 2021 and became fully operational in mid-2023. In the 2023-2024 academic year, the school officially moved to its current location.

== See also ==
- Education in Mongolia
