= Ulaanbaatar Cable Car =

Gondola lift in Ulaanbaatar, Mongolia

Overview
- Status: under construction
- Line no.: 2
- Location: Ulaanbaatar
- Country: Mongolia
- Termini: Yarmag (1st line); National Garden Park (2nd line); Kharkhorin (1st line); Shangri-La Ulaanbaatar Complex (2nd line)
- No. of stations: 4
- Built by: Poma, Monnis Engineering
- Construction begin: 4 April 2024
- Open: December 2026; 1 month's time

Operation
- Owner: Unified Project Management Authority
- No. of carriers: 98 (1st line)
- Carrier capacity: 10 passengers (1st line)
- Trip duration: 12 minutes (1st line)

Technical features
- Line length: 4.2 km (14,000 ft) (1st line); 2.7 km (8,900 ft) (2nd line)

The Ulaanbaatar Cable Car is a gondola lift system under construction in Ulaanbaatar, Mongolia, scheduled to open December 15, 2026.

== History ==
The initial route for the first line was Bayankhoshuu and the III microdistrict, but later on changed to Yarmag and Kharkhorin. The groundbreaking ceremony for the first line of the cable car was held on 4 April 2024 at Artsat Valley, Yarmag, Ulaanbaatar. Land acquisition for the construction of the cable car towers was completed by November 2024. An opening date of December 15, 2026, has been announced.

== Technical specifications ==
The cable car system is being engineered by Poma from France and Monnis Engineering as local subcontractor. It is owned by Unified Project Management Authority.

=== First line (Yarmag, Kharkhorin) ===
For the first line, the cable car line will connect Yarmag (47.8734°N 106.8431°E) (at Artsat Yarmag Station) and Unur Khoroolol (47.9109°N 106.8338°E) (at Kharkhorin Station). It will stretch for a length of 4.2 km with two stops in between supported by 19 pylons and crosses Tuul River. It will have a total of 98 cabins with a maximum capacity of 10 passengers per cabin and a total transport capacity of 2,300 passengers per hour. The one-way journey for the trip will take 12 minutes.

=== Second line (National Garden, Shangri-La) ===
The second line of the cable car will connect the southwest parking lot of National Garden Park and northwest side of Shangri-La Ulaanbaatar Complex. The line will have eight towers with a total length of 2.7 km. It will have a total transport capacity of 3,400 passengers per hour.

=== Cabins ===
The cable car cabins will feature heating system for winter months and ventilation for summer months, double power supply for redundancy and safety system.

== Finance ==
The construction project is financed by soft loan from the Government of France.
