= Mongol Tower =

Proposed supertall skyscraper in Ulaanbaatar, Mongolia

- Монгол Тауэр
- Interactive map of the Mongol Tower area
- Alternative names: Mon Uran Tower

General information
- Status: Proposed
- Type: Mixed-use
- Architectural style: Contemporary
- Location: Chinggis Khan Avenue, Ulaanbaatar, Mongolia
- Coordinates: 47°54′43.0″N 106°54′55.8″E
- Cost: $300,000,000

Height
- Architectural: 301 m (988 ft)

Technical details
- Floor count: 68 (+ 4 below ground)
- Floor area: 170,000 m^{2} (1,829,865 sq ft)

Design and construction
- Architect: Nikken Sekkei
- Developer: Mon Uran LLC

Website
- https://www.nikken.jp/en/projects/mixed_use/mongol_tower.html

Mongol Tower (Mongolian: Монгол Тауэр), also known as the Mon Uran Tower, is a planned supertall skyscraper on Chinggis Khan Avenue in Ulaanbaatar, Mongolia that was officially proposed in 2015. If fully realized, it would stand 301 m (988 ft) tall and would have 68 floors, becoming the tallest building in Mongolia by surpassing the current tallest building, Eco Tower One, by nearly 200 ft (61 m). It would also become the country's first supertall skyscraper, defined as a building over 300 m (984 ft), and rank as the third-tallest structure in Mongolia overall.

The architectural concept was created by the international firm Nikken Sekkei in partnership with Mon Uran LLC. Design highlights include horizontally oriented windows that provide panoramic views alongside a gradual increase in glass proportions from the lower levels to the crown. This creates the illusion that the tower rises straight out of the earth and blends into the sky. The top floor is planned to house an observation deck and a members-only lounge.

The project has not yet broken ground, and reports state that construction is unlikely to begin in the next five to ten years. The designated construction site is currently occupied by the Dunjingarav Headquarters along Chinggis Khan Avenue. Located approximately 500 m (1,640 ft) away from Sükhbaatar Square in the heart of Ulaanbaatar, the proposed mixed-use complex will feature a top-class hotel, luxury residences, Grade A offices, and commercial retail facilities.

== See also ==
- List of tallest buildings in Mongolia
- List of tallest structures in Mongolia
- List of supertall skyscrapers
