= International Commercial Center =

Office skyscraper in Sükhbaatar, Ulaanbaatar, Mongolia

- Олон улсын худалдааны төв
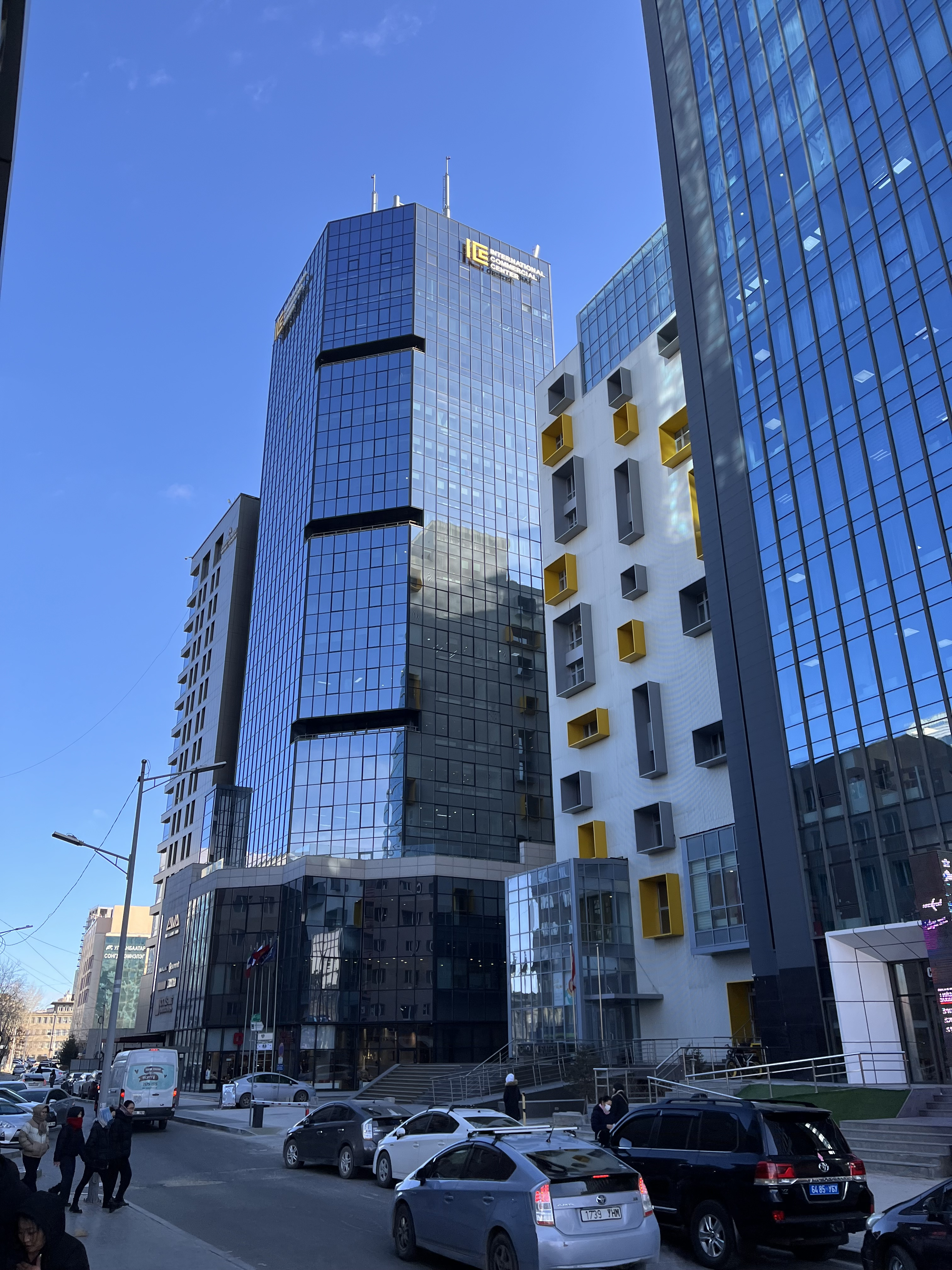
- International Commercial Center in November 2024
- Interactive map of the International Commercial Center area

General information
- Status: Completed
- Type: Office
- Location: Jamiyan Gun Street 9, Sükhbaatar, Ulaanbaatar, Mongolia
- Coordinates: 47°54′57.5″N 106°55′11.2″E
- Completed: 2013

Height
- Architectural: 100 m (328 ft)

Technical details
- Floor count: 21
- Lifts/elevators: 4

Website
- https://www.icctower.mn/office

The International Commercial Center (Mongolian: Олон улсын худалдааны төв), also known as the Tsat Building, is an office skyscraper in Sükhbaatar District, Ulaanbaatar, Mongolia. Completed in 2013, the skyscraper stands 100 m (328 ft) tall, encompasses 21 floors, and ranks as one of the tallest buildings in the city.

== Gallery ==
International Commercial Center in June 2016

== See also ==
- List of tallest buildings in Mongolia
