= Narantuul Market =

Market in Bayanzürkh, Ulaanbaatar, Mongolia

Narantuul Market Нарантуул зах
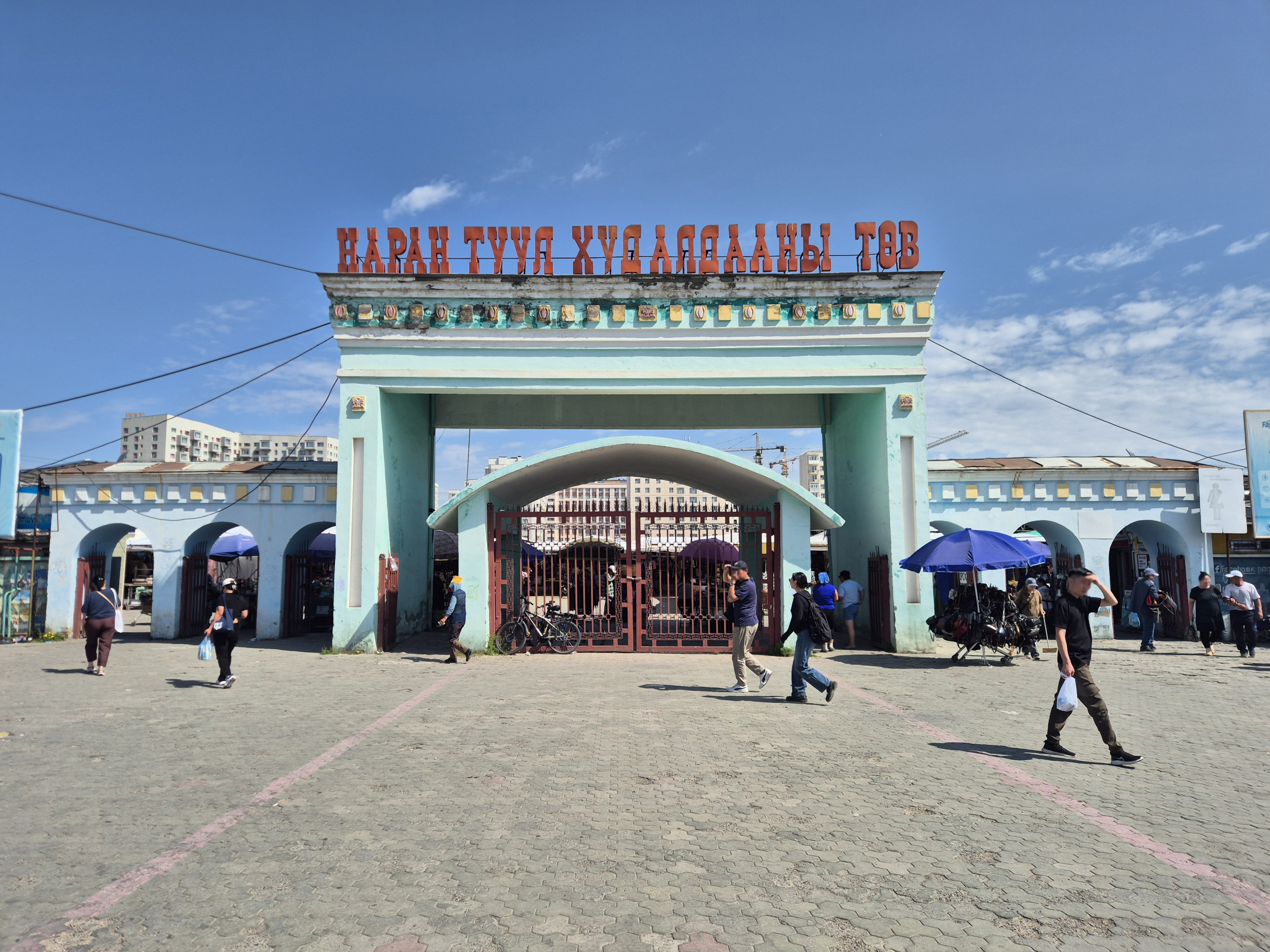
- Location: Bayanzürkh, Ulaanbaatar, Mongolia; 47°54′33.1″N 106°56′53.0″E
- Opening date: 1993 (original site); 1999 (current site)
- Goods sold: outdoor activity goods, shoes, clothes, winter goods, groceries, carpets
- Total retail floor area: 22.2 hectares
- Parking: Yes
- Interactive map of Narantuul Market; Нарантуул зах

The Narantuul Market (Mongolian: Нарантуул зах) or the Black Market is a marketplace in Bayanzürkh District, Ulaanbaatar, Mongolia. It is the largest outdoor market in the country.

== History ==
The market was established in 1993. It moved to its current site in 1999.

In January 2013, it was reported that Narantuul Market was under investigation due to alleged irregularities in its land license. The market, owned by politician Saikhansambuu Shinensambuu, was reportedly granted a 25-year public service land license, despite city regulations limiting such licenses to five years. While authorities deemed the extended license illegal, the Ulaanbaatar City Administration was reluctant to revoke it, citing the livelihoods of thousands of vendors dependent on the market.

In August 2013, a fire severely damaged the grocery section of Narantuul Market, affecting over 300 shops. The damaged section, in operation since 1999, was found to be structurally substandard and lacked state approval.

== Architecture ==
The market spans over an area of 22.2 hectares. It is the largest outdoor market in Mongolia.

== Business ==
Narantuul Market accommodates vendors conducting both wholesale and retail business. In 2021, it was reported that over 8,000 vendors operated shops and stalls in the market, drawing between 100,000 and 150,000 visitors daily.

The market offers household necessities and secondhand goods. The sale of illegal items, including unlicensed prescription drugs, animal products such as furs, feathers, pelts, and traps, as well as bullets, hunting equipment, and rare herbs, has been reported by authorities.

== See also ==
- Economy of Mongolia
