= Khurel Togoot Astronomical Observatory =

Astronomical observatory in Bayanzürkh, Ulaanbaatar, Mongolia

Khurel Togoot Astronomical Observatory Хүрэл Тогоот Одон Орон Геофизикийн Хүрээлэн
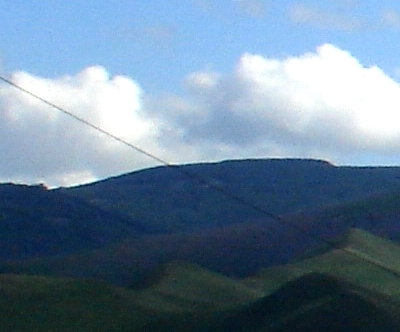
- Organization: Mongolian Academy of Sciences
- Location: Bayanzürkh, Ulaanbaatar, Mongolia
- Coordinates: 47°51′54.0″N 107°03′11.4″E
- Altitude: 1,620 m (5,310 ft)
- Established: 1957

The Khurel Togoot Astronomical Observatory (Mongolian: Хүрэл Тогоот Одон Орон Геофизикийн Хүрээлэн) is an astronomical oservatory in Bogd Khan Mountain, Bayanzürkh, Ulaanbaatar, Mongolia.

== History ==
The observatory was founded in 1957 with the construction of the main buildings. In 1996, the observatory became part of the newly founded Research Centre of Astronomy and Geophysics of Mongolian Academy of Sciences. Since 2013, the observatory had been opened to the public.

== Architecture ==
The observatory is located at an altitude of 1,620 meters above sea level.

== Activities ==
The observatory regularly conducts research activities in astrophysics, astrometry and satellite geodesy.

== See also ==
- Education in Mongolia
