= Bayan-Ölgii Province longwave radio broadcast mast =

Radio mast in Ölgii, Bayan-Ölgii, Mongolia

Bayan-Ölgii Province longwave radio broadcast tower
- Баян-Өлгий аймгийн радио өргөн нэвтрүүлгийн урт долгионы цамхаг
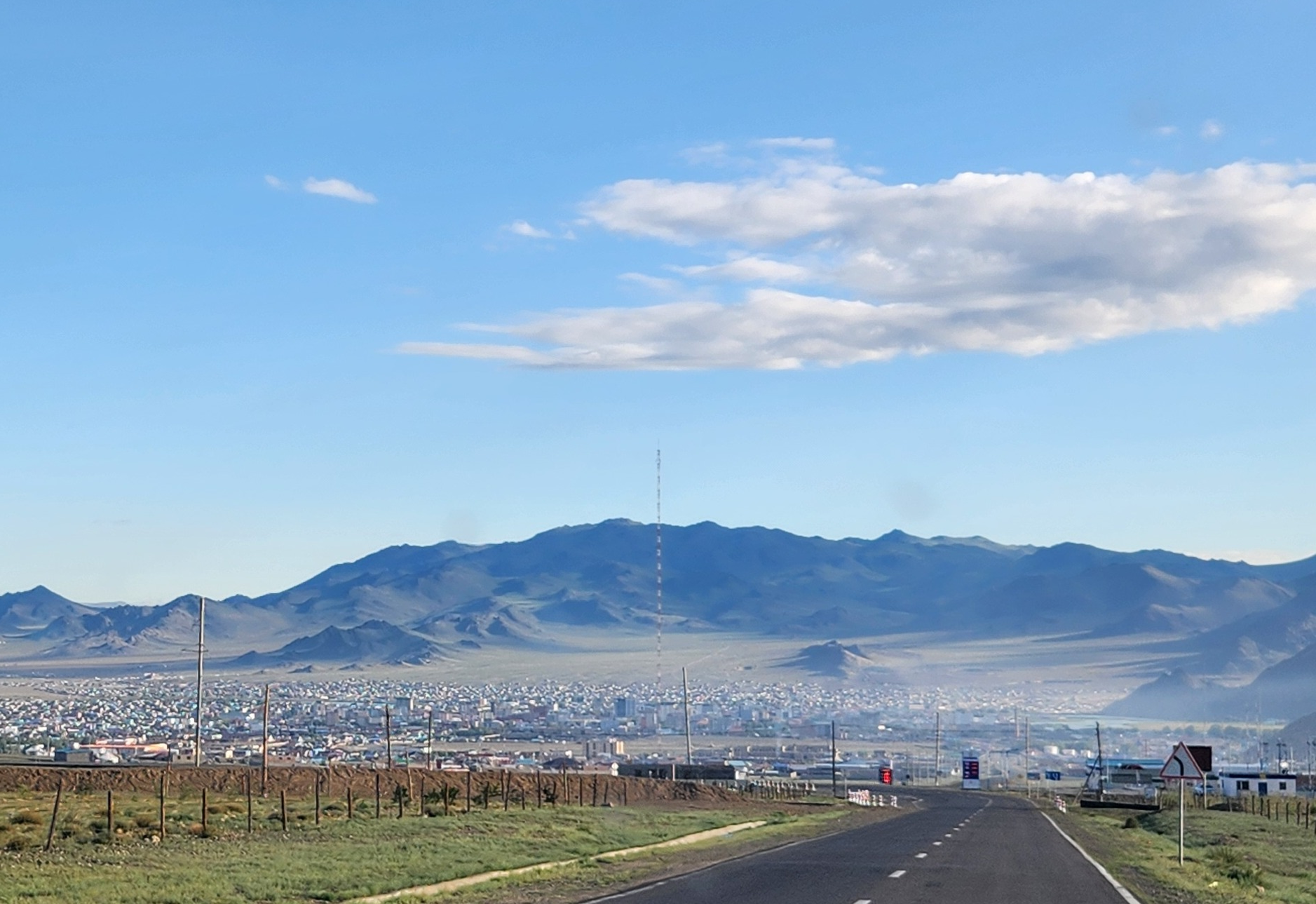
- Road towards Ölgii with the structure in the background
- Interactive map of the Bayan-Ölgii Province longwave radio broadcast tower area

General information
- Status: Completed
- Type: radio mast
- Location: Ölgii, Mongolia
- Coordinates: 48°57′24″N 89°58′13″E
- Opening: April 1964

Height
- Antenna spire: 352.5 m (1,156 ft)

Bayan-Ölgii Province longwave radio broadcast tower (Mongolian: Баян-Өлгий аймгийн радио өргөн нэвтрүүлгийн урт долгионы цамхаг) is a guyed mast, and the tallest structure in Mongolia at a height of 352.5 meters. The mast serves as a radio antenna.

The radio center and station's foundations were laid in 1961, with aid from Czechoslovakia, while the mast was constructed in April 1964.

It is located in Ölgii in Bayan-Ölgii Province. The radio tower has mast lights, lit with blue lights. On it radio advertisements and the local time are written in large letters.

== See also ==
- Media of Mongolia
- Communications in Mongolia
