= International Intellectual Museum =

Museum in Bayanzürkh, Ulaanbaatar, Mongolia

- Оюун Ухааны Музей
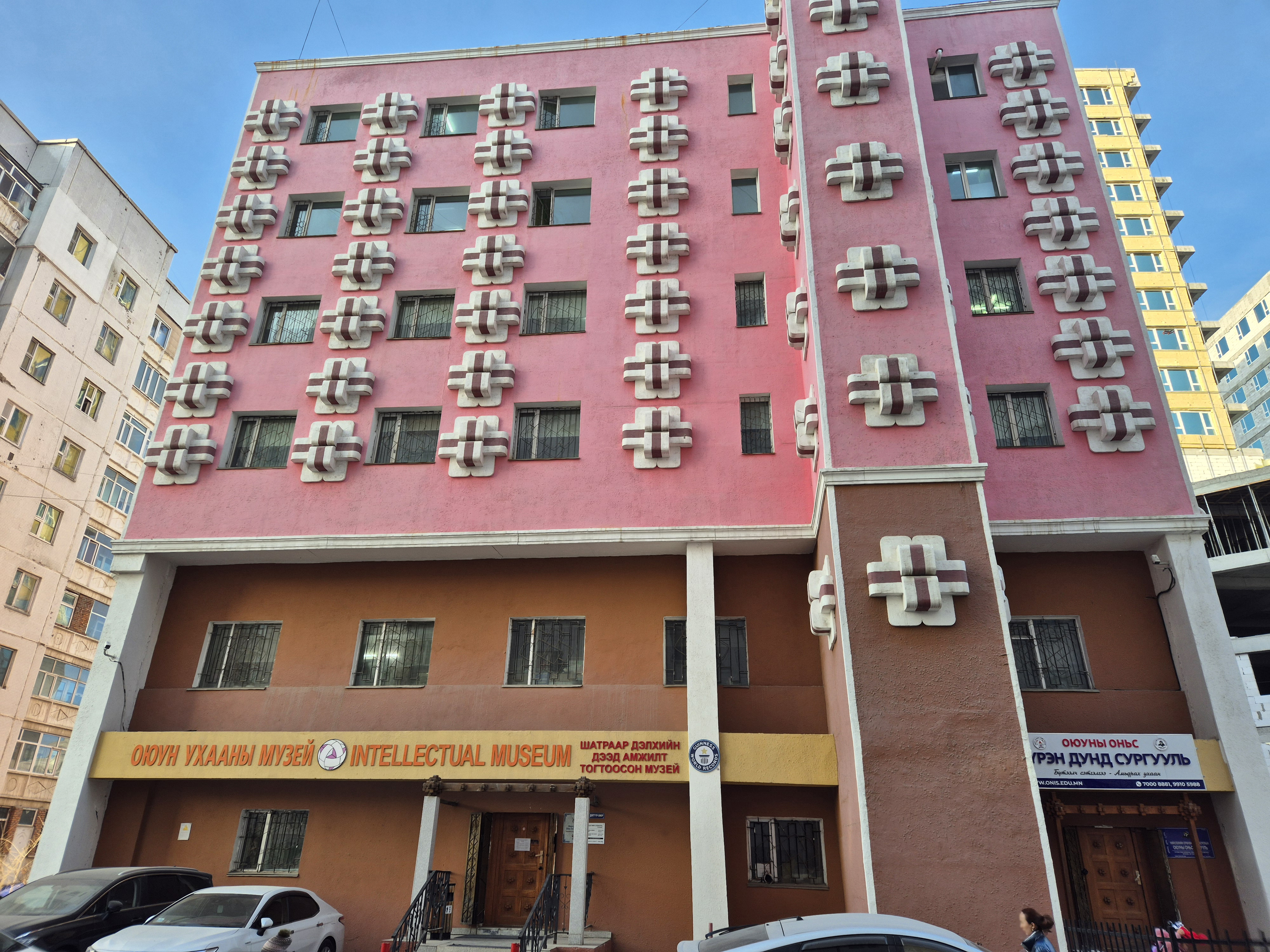
- Established: 13 August 1990
- Location: Bayanzürkh, Ulaanbaatar, Mongolia
- Coordinates: 47°55′02.9″N 106°56′30.2″E
- Type: museum
- Founder: Tumen Ulzii
- Website: Official website

The International Intellectual Museum (Mongolian: Оюун Ухааны Музей) is a museum in Bayanzürkh, Ulaanbaatar, Mongolia.

== History ==
The museum was established on 13 August 1990 by the founder Tumen Ulzii.

== Exhibitions ==
The museum exhibits more than 11,000 science-related items from 130 countries worldwide. It is divided into 15 sections.

== See also ==
- List of museums in Mongolia
