= Sky Resort =

Ski report in Bayanzürkh, Ulaanbaatar, Mongolia

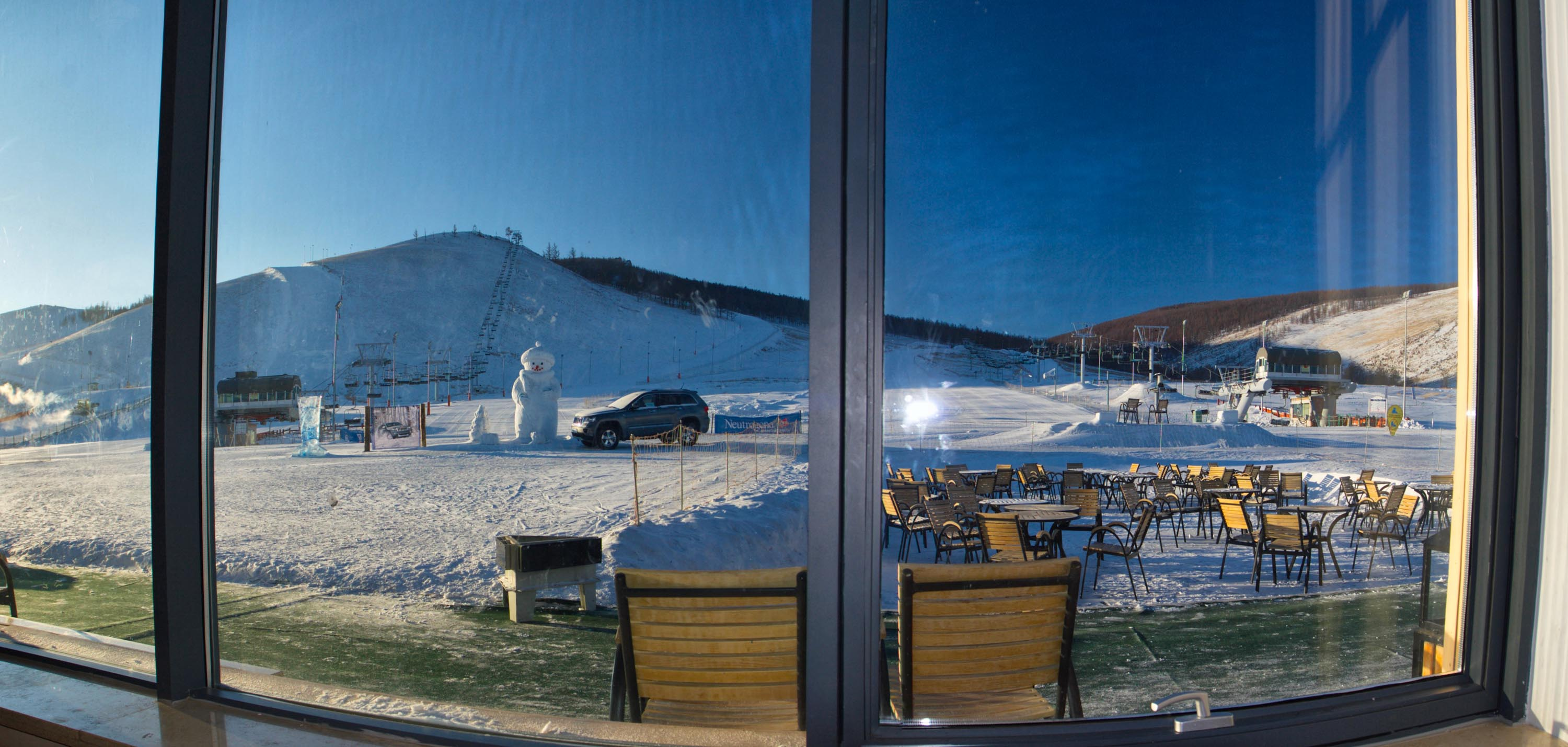
- Interactive map of Sky Resort
- Location: Bogd Khan Mountain
- Nearest city: Bayanzürkh, Ulaanbaatar, Mongolia
- Coordinates: 47.905526°N 106.97422°E
- Vertical: 191 metres (627 ft)
- Top elevation: 1,570 metres (5,150 ft)
- Base elevation: 1,379 metres (4,524 ft)
- Trails: 9
- Longest run: 1.07 kilometres (0.66 mi) "Zaisan"
- Lift system: 2 quad chairlifts, 2 surface lists, 3 moving carpets
- Snowfall: 20 centimetres (7.9 in)
- Snowmaking: yes
- Night skiing: 6-10 PM
- Website: http://www.skyresort.mn/

Sky Resort is a ski resort in Bayanzürkh District, Ulaanbaatar, Mongolia. The resort is sited on Bogd Khan Mountain, with a base of 1,379 metres (4,524 ft) and tops out at 1,570 metres (5,150 ft).

== Ownership and location ==
It is owned and operated as a joint venture by MCS Group with Petrovis, Skytel company and Kerry group, and is located on Bogd Khan Uul. The resort is a year-round recreation destination and offers a wide range of outdoor activities. A golf course was preliminary opened in summer 2012 and set to be fully operational in 2013. Ski season is usually open from November to March or April depending on weather conditions. Night skiing as well as different package tours are also offered.

Sky Resort is approximately 13 kilometres (8.1 mi) from Ulaanbaatar. The closest airport is Buyant-Ukhaa International Airport.

== Mountain statistics ==
=== Trails ===
Easier	More Difficult	Most Difficult
4	2	1

- Skiable area:
- 9 trails (including ski school and sledding slope)
  - novice - 44%
  - intermediate - 22%
  - advanced and expert - 11%
- Longest trail - 1.07 kilometres (0.66 mi)

=== Lifts ===
Name	Capacity	Vertical
Davkhia	Quad	
Tsogio	Quad	
Khatiraa	1 person surface lift	
Shogshoo	1 person surface lift	
Moving Carpet 1		
Moving Carpet 2		
Moving Carpet 3		

- 7 Total
  - 2 Quad Chairs
  - 2 Surface Lifts
  - 3 moving carpets
- Uphill Capacity - skiers per hour
