= Unur Bul Child Center =

Orphanage in Sükhbaatar, Ulaanbaatar, Mongolia

- Өнөр бүл хүүхдийн төв

General information
- Type: orphanage
- Location: Bayanzürkh, Ulaanbaatar, Mongolia
- Coordinates: 47°55′10.3″N 106°58′45.7″E
- Opened: 27 December 1974

The Unur Bul Child Center (Mongolian: Өнөр бүл хүүхдийн төв) is an orphanage in Bayanzürkh, Ulaanbaatar, Mongolia.

== History ==
The center was established on 27 December 1974 when kindergarten class affiliated with the orphanage merged with Kindergarten No. 58 of Ulaanbaatar City to form the orphanage. During the center's 50th anniversary, President Ukhnaagiin Khürelsükh donated some equipment and furniture to the center. On 6 June 2018, the Government of Mongolia approved a donation funding of MNT100 million for the center.

== Architecture ==
The center also includes other facilities such as library, hospital and psychology services.

== Occupants ==
The center caters for children which are homeless, from the street, with mental disorders and those whose parents are deprived from their parental rights. As of 2018, there were a total of 185 children living in the center.

== See also ==
- Human rights in Mongolia
