= Shirnengiin Ayuush =

Mongolian musician

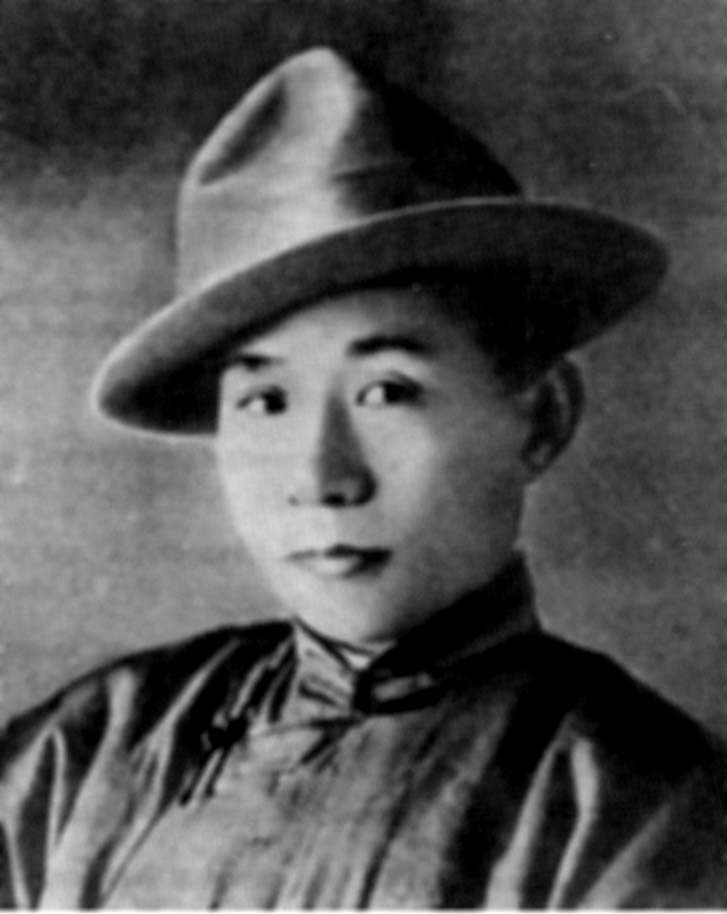
Shirnengiin Ayuush

Shirnengiin Ayuush (Mongolian: Ширнэнгийн Аюуш; 1903–1938) was a Mongolian composer, novelist and art historian, one of the leading composers of Mongolia in the 1930s.

He was born in Bayanzürkh, near the capital of Ulaanbaatar. He graduated from the Institute of Oriental Studies in Moscow in 1924, and was employed by the government in the 1930s, becoming artistic director of the Ministry of the People in 1934, and the Vice Minister of the Ministry from 1936. He is best known for composing operas which incorporated traditional folk melodies such as Arat Damdin and Princess Dolgor. J. F. Conceicao describes Arat Damdin and Princess Dolgor as the "next experiment of the musical theatre", which dealt with "topical problems of that time". He was awarded for his services to Mongolian literature in 1935. Ayuush, along with other writers such as Sonombaljiriin Buyannemekü and Mördendewiin Idamsürüng, was executed during a purge directed by communist leader Khorloogiin Choibalsan in the late 1930s.
