= Mongolia International University =

University in Bayanzürkh, Ulaanbaatar, Mongolia

- Motto: Educating Tomorrow's Global Leaders
- Type: Private
- Established: 2002; 24 years ago
- Chancellor: Dr. Oh-Moon Kwon (2nd)
- President: Oh Moon Kwon
- Faculty: 70
- Administrative staff: 120
- Undergraduates: 800 (2016)
- Location: Bayanzürkh, Ulaanbaatar, Mongolia; 47.9138°N 106.9744°E
- Website: http://www.miu.edu.mn

Mongolia International University (MIU; Mongolian: Монгол Олон Улсын Дээд Сургууль) is a private institution of tertiary education located in Bayanzürkh, Ulaanbaatar, Mongolia. It was established in 2002 on land gifted to it by former Mongolian president Natsagiin Bagabandi. It is an English-speaking university that offers 14 recognized bachelor's programs.

== History ==
In November 2001, the MIU Foundation Committee established an international university under the consent of former Mongolian President Natsagiin Bagabandi. In 2002, Mongolia International University opened with 66 students, 36 in the Department of International Business Management and 30 in the Department of Information Technology. Dr. Dong Yeon Won was appointed as the first president of MIU.

From 2003 to 2006, MIU established more departments and research centers, including the Department of Biotechnology and Food Science, Department of English Education, and Graduate Program in TESOL. In June 2006, MIU celebrated its first graduation ceremony, and Dr. Oh-Moon Kwon was appointed as the second president; and Dr. Dong Yeon Won as honorary president. Also in 2006, the Language Education Institute (LEI) was established.

Over the years, more academic programs became available, such as the Department of Fashion Design, Department of Energy Resource and Environmental Technology, Department of Hotel Management, Truman Graduate School of Public Affairs, Art Research Center (ARC), and Mongolian Language & Culture Center (MLCC). In 2009, MIU established an international secondary school called Mongolia International School (MIS), which is now Mongolia Itgel High School.

== Academics ==
Undergraduate programs

- International Business Management (IM)
- Computer Science (CS)
- Software Engineering (SE)
- Fashion Design (FD)
- Biotechnology and Food Science (BT)
- Energy Resource and Environment Technology (ET)
- English Education (EE)
- Music Education (ME)
- Hotel Management (HM)
- Tourism Management (TM)
- School of Media and Communication (MC)

Graduate programs

- M.A. in Foreign Language Education (formerly established as Graduate Program in TESOL)
- Truman Graduate School of Public Administration (joint degree program with University of Missouri)
- Master in Software Engineering (MSE) (Spring 2017)
- Master of Business Administration (MBA) (Spring 2017)

Language education

- Language Education Institute (LEI)
- Mongolian Language and Culture Center (MLCC)

== Campus ==
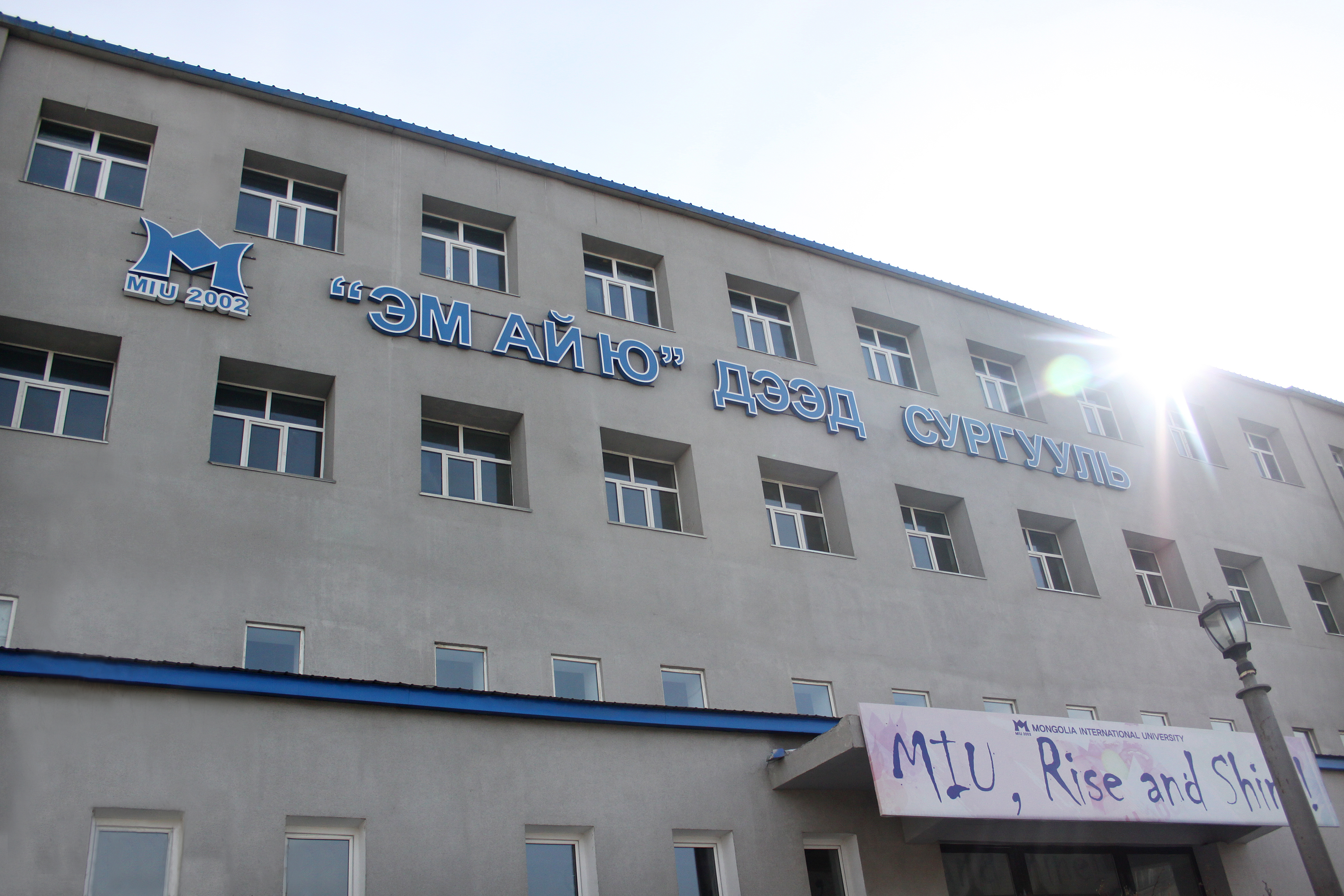
MIU main building

According to MIU's website, about 30% of its students are international students from USA, Russia, Korea, Kazakhstan, Azerbaijan, Afghanistan, Tajikistan and Uzbekistan.

The majority of students commute to the university from their homes in Ulaanbaatar. For international students, housing options include renting local, non-MIU apartments or living in the MIU dormitory.

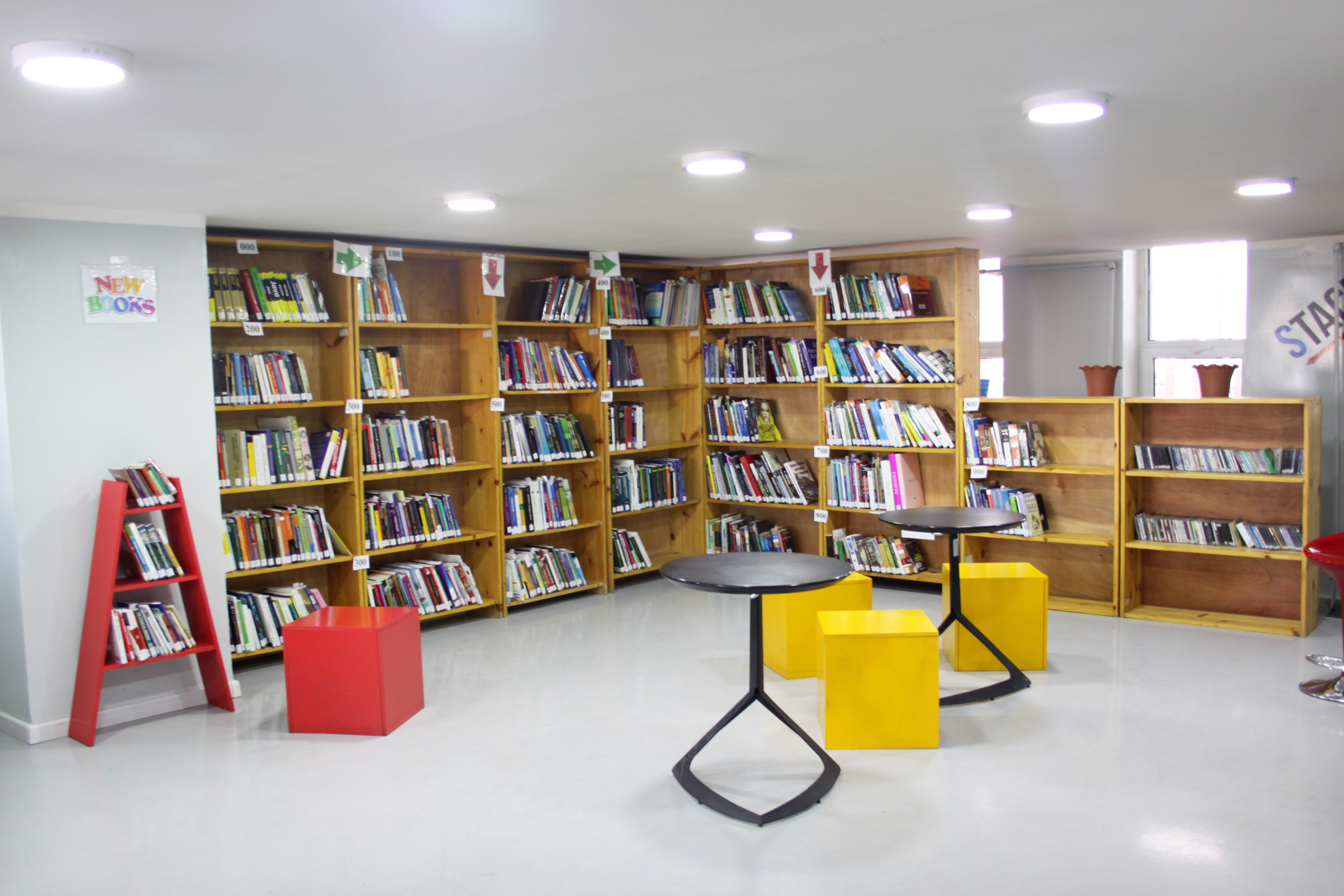
Library Stacks

The MIU dormitory complex is located off-campus and houses up to approximately 100 students. Dormitory rooms accommodate two to three students depending on the size of the room. When dormitory capacity is limited, freshmen are given priority. Several faculty members and staff also live at the dormitory and serve as residential advisors.

MIU operates a cafeteria-style dining facility on-campus. Meals and snacks are served every weekday to students and faculty. The lunch menu options include Mongolian and Korean dishes. On campus, there is a Gilgal Cafe that serves coffee, tea, and baked goods.

== Student life ==
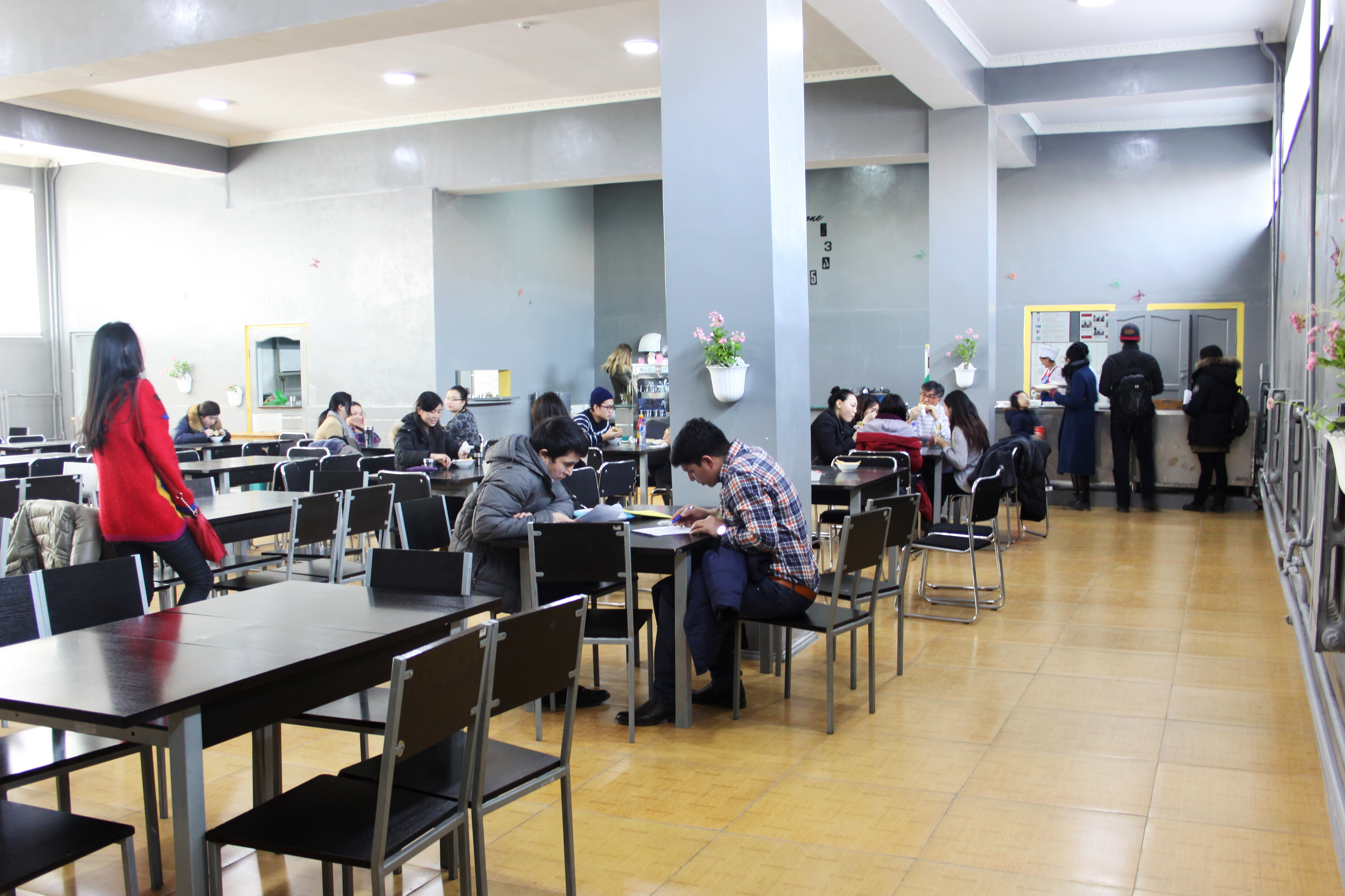
Student cafeteria

- Student Union (SU): Student Union serves as the governing body for MIU student clubs, and organizes events such as Arts Festival, Culture Night, Christmas Party, and sports competitions.
- MIU View: MIU View is the student-led newspaper of MIU.
- Student clubs and organizations: Debate Society, Book Club, Student Visionary Club, Chinggis Khaan Leadership Club, and others.

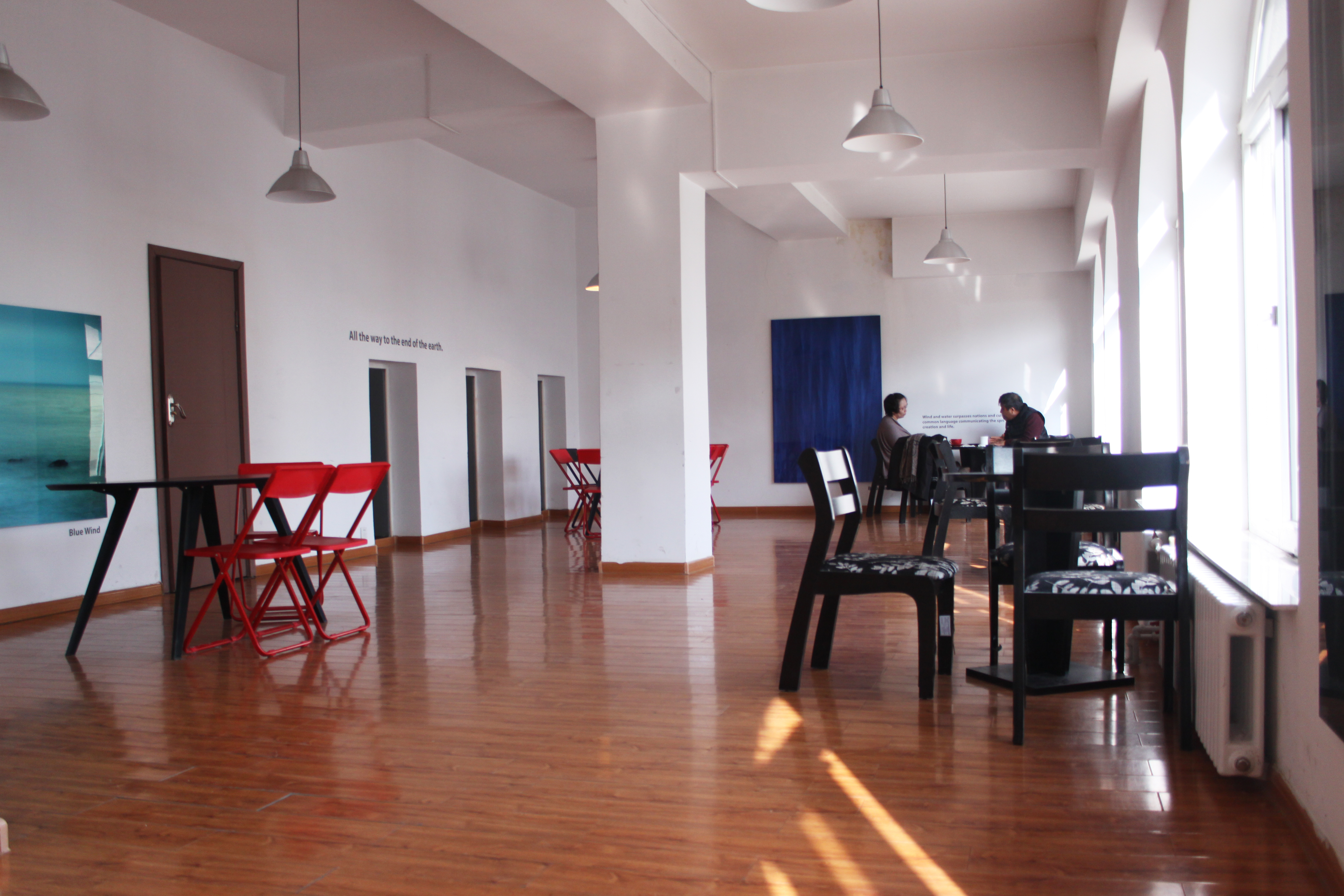
MIU staff lounge

- Career Development Program (CDP) and Job Fairs: MIU helps current and former students discover what careers fit their abilities. Internship opportunities are provided, and students approaching graduation are assisted to find their careers and trained in how to fill out job applications and how to go about the interview process.

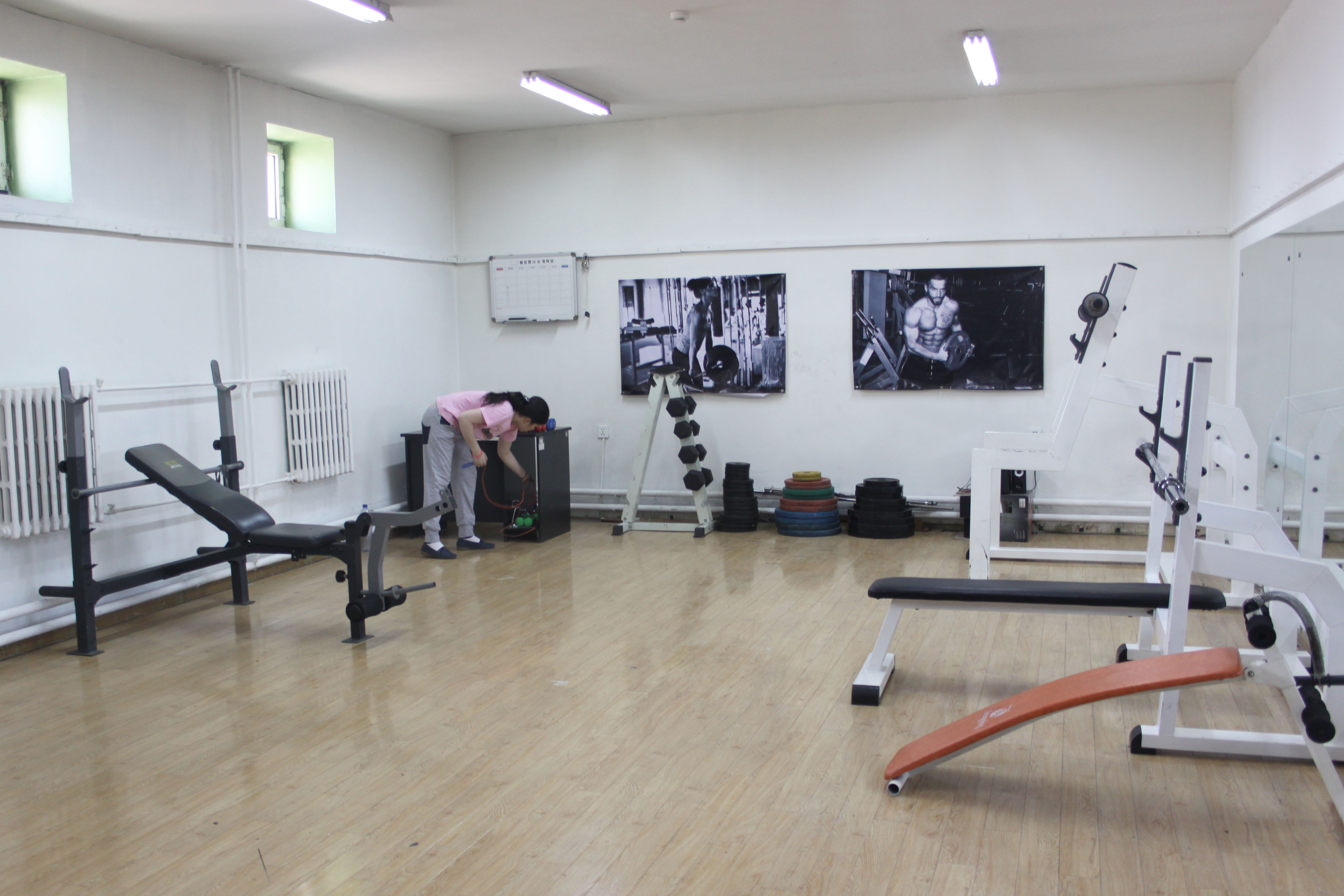
Student Gym

- Since 2002, the MIU winter Vision Trip Program (VTP) has enabled students, during the two-week program that takes place every winter vacation, to travel to North America, China, or South Korea. Students are accompanied by MIU faculty and staff members, as they visit universities, companies, historical sites and attractions, as well as organizations and institutions.
- The Exchange Student Program (ESP) enables students to study at one of many sister-universities abroad for one semester, while maintaining the regular curricula from the host universities. MIU students are eligible to study abroad during the spring or fall semester of their sophomore or junior year, or the fall semester of their senior year.
- The Student Care Program (SCP) is a program where every student is matched with an advisor from their department. Professors are available to discuss academic questions, as well as about life outside of the classrooms. Through individual and group settings, professors encourage, advice, and assist their students from career-related interests to helping them find their way to get involved on campus.
- Scholarship Programs: There are both academic and special scholarships available for eligible students, such as MIU Academic Scholarship, Financial Aid Scholarship (Work-Study), Special Achievement Scholarship, New Region Aid, and Designated Scholarships.
- The Student Success Center (SSC) is a tutoring center that offers English grammar and writing instruction to students needing extracurricular support for their English skills. It also serves as a Writing Lab for students of all classifications and majors. Tutors are available for subjects other than English, and can help with IM, BT, and IT classes.

== Affiliated organizations ==
- The Language Education Institute (LEI) offers English and Mongolian language education. The English foundation courses are offered to provide prospective MIU undergraduates with a way to gain a foundation in the English language. Typically, students who spend one year completing the English foundation courses are able to successfully enter the undergraduate program at MIU. The English foundation courses are open not only to prospective MIU students, but also to anyone interested in improving their English skills.
- LEI offers summer and winter courses in English as well as evening classes in English during the school year. Besides English, LEI also offers Mongolian courses that prepare students to read, write, listen and speak in Mongolian. They are especially designed for foreigners who want to understand the Mongolian language, lifestyle, and culture.
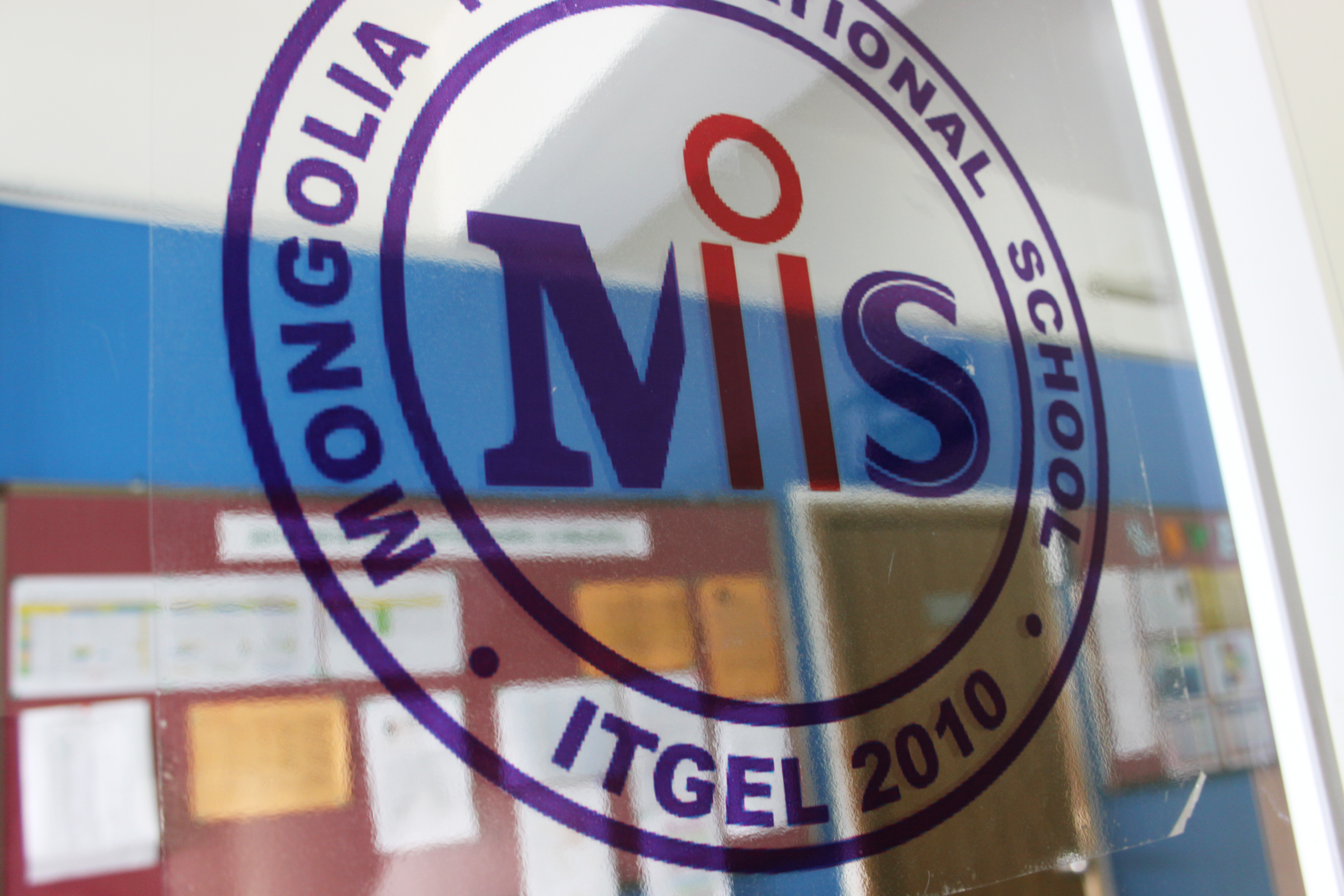
- Mongolia Itgel School
  The Mongolia Itgel School (MIS) is a Mongolian high school which is an affiliated institute of MIU. As a specialized high school, Itgel emphasizes foreign language and mathematics education.
