= Mongol Art Gallery =

Art gallery in Bayanzürkh, Ulaanbaatar, Mongolia

- Монгол Арт Галерейн
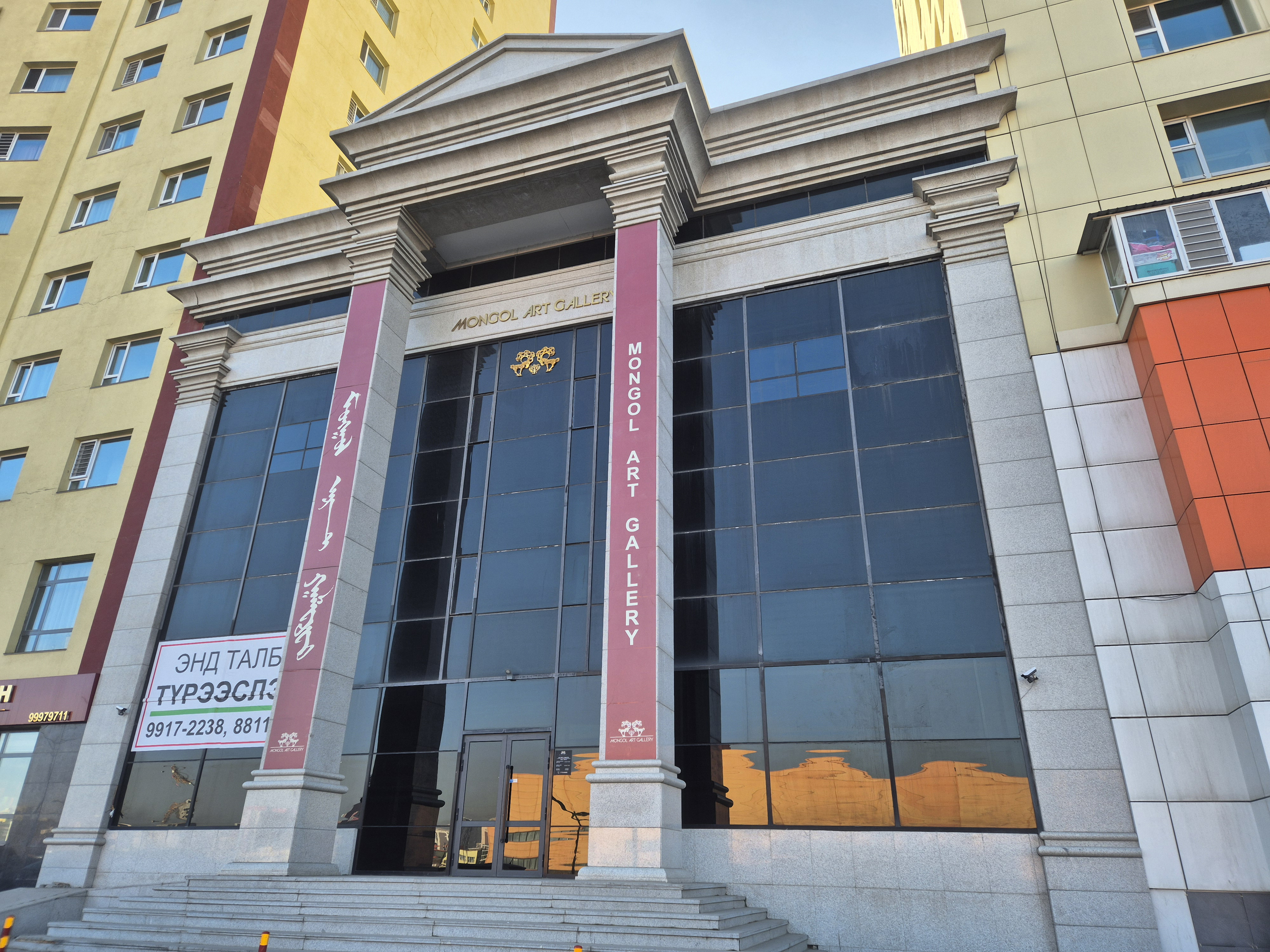
- Established: 2019
- Location: Bayanzürkh, Ulaanbaatar, Mongolia
- Coordinates: 47°54′16.3″N 106°56′55.7″E
- Type: art gallery
- Website: Official website

The Mongol Art Gallery (Mongolian: Монгол Арт Галерейн) is an art gallery in Bayanzürkh, Ulaanbaatar, Mongolia.

== History ==
The art gallery was established in 2019.

== Exhibitions ==
The gallery displays various art exhibitions.

== See also ==
- Culture of Mongolia
