= Bayanzürkh =

District in Ulaanbaatar, Mongolia

Coordinates: 47.9290°N 106.9450°E

Bayanzürkh District Баянзүрх дүүрэг ᠪᠠᠶᠠᠨᠵᠢᠷᠦᠬᠡᠲᠡᠭᠦᠷᠭᠡ
- Municipal District
- Flag Coat of arms
- Interactive map of Bayanzürkh District
- Country: Mongolia
- Municipality: Ulaanbaatar
- Nairamdal raion of Ulaanbaatar: 14 April 1965
- Reorganized as district: 18 August 1992

Government
  - Body: Citizens' Representatives Khural of the Bayanzürkh district

Area
  - Total: 1,244.1 km^{2} (480.3 sq mi)

Population (2024)
  - Total: 436,822
- Time zone: UTC+8 (UTC + 8)
- Website: http://bzd.ub.gov.mn/

Bayanzürkh (Mongolian: Баянзүрх [páɪnt͡surx]; lit. 'Rich Heart') is one of nine districts of the Mongolian capital of Ulaanbaatar. It is subdivided into 28 subdistricts.

Bayanzürkh is the largest and most populous district in the capital. Lying in the southeast of the city, the district is located at the foot of one of the four mountains of Ulaanbaatar, Bayanzürkh Uul.

== History ==
The district was established by a decree of the Presidium of the People's Great Khural on 14 April 1965 as the Nairamdal (Mongolian: Найрамдал, lit. 'Harmony, Peace') raion of Ulaanbaatar. At that time, the capital consisted of only four raions, including Nairamdal.

It was later reorganized and renamed as a municipal district of Ulaanbaatar on 18 August 1992, following the dissolution of the Mongolian People's Republic. Similar to other districts, Bayanzürkh's local government consists of the governor who is appointed by its legislature, the Citizens' Representatives Khural of Bayanzürkh District.

In 2023, it had an approximate population of 420,793 people in 131,902 households. A total of 23 state kindergartens and 19 secondary schools are located in the district area.

== Economy ==
Encanto Trade Center in 2026

The head office of Eznis Airways is located in the Shine Dul Building (Шинэ Дөл Билдинг) in Bayanzürkh. The head office moved there by 27 August 2011.

In August 2026, the Encanto Trade Center building, built in Bayanzürkh, was confirmed to be the tallest building in the district and in Mongolia with a height of 135 metres and 35 floors. However, its feat was soon topped out by Eco Tower One, located in Sükhbaatar district and to be completed in 2028, in September 2026.

== Education ==
- Mongolia International University
- University of Finance and Economics
- University of Internal Affairs of Mongolia

== Infrastructure ==
- Khurel Togoot Astronomical Observatory
- Second State Central Hospital
- Unur Bul Child Center

== Tourist attractions ==
- International Intellectual Museum
- Manjusri Monastery
- Marshall Zhukov House Museum
- Mongol Art Gallery
- Mongolor Building
- Narantuul Market
- National Garden Park
- Saints Peter and Paul Cathedral
- Ulaanbaatar City Museum
- Sky Resort

== Notable people ==
- Shirnengiin Ayuush (1903–1938), composer and writer
- Damdin Sükhbaatar (1893–1924), communist leader and revolutionary
