= Mongolor Building =

Building in Bayanzürkh, Ulaanbaatar, Mongolia

Coordinates: 47.9170°N 106.9653°E

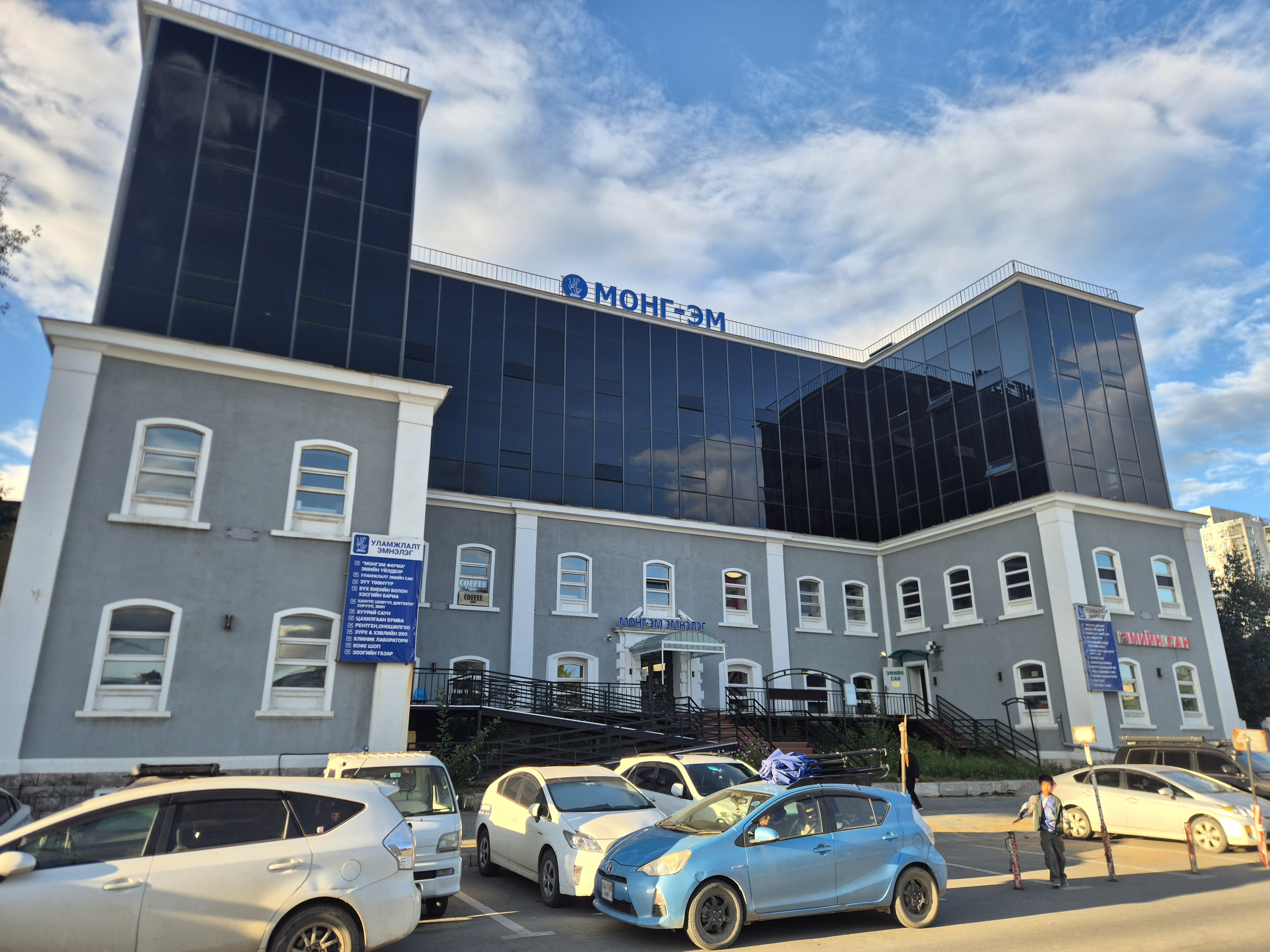
The building is now converted into the Mong-Em Hospital

The Mongolor Building is a historical two-story building built in 1905 in Bayanzürkh, Ulaanbaatar, Mongolia. It has been called by various names in Mongolian such as the Angli Bank Building (Англи Банкны Барилга), Red Building of Grot (Гротын улаан), Headquarters of Baron Ungern (Барон Унгерны штаб), Prison of the Baron (Бароны шорон), School of the Red Pants (Улаан Өмдөтний Сургууль) and Military Hospital (Цэргийн госпиталь). It is known as the earliest Dutch-style stone building of Ulaanbaatar.

== History ==
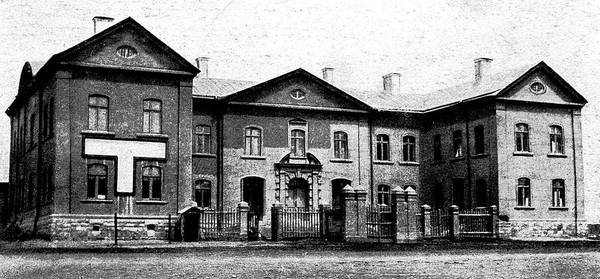
Historical photo of the Mongolor Building

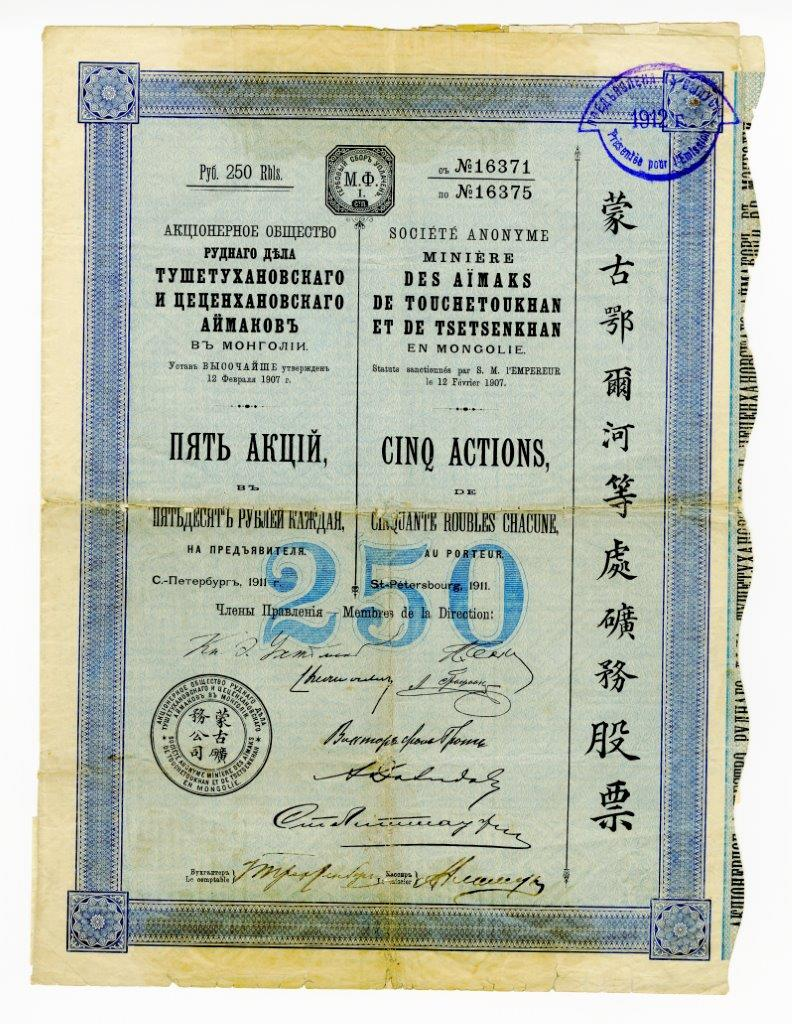
Note of the Mongolor Company for Five "Actions" or Stocks

The building is the former site of the Mongolor company. Mongolor stands for "Mongol Or" in French meaning Mongolian Gold. Mongolor LLC was the new name given in 1900 to an expanded version of the "Joint Stock Company for the Mining Entreprise in the Tushetu and Setsen Khan Aimags of Mongolia" which was itself founded in 1899 based on a 25-year gold mining concession granted to Victor von Grot, an official of the Russian Embassy in Peking. Von Grot, of Belgian origin, was in his thirties. The Mongolor company had investment from Russia, the Netherlands, Belgium (King Leopold II) and France. It was incorporated in Saint Petersburg. The company was managed in Mongolia by Baron Grot. The Qing Dynasty ordered the Mongolian Company to stop operating in order to pacify the Mongolian sentiment (public discontent). In February of the 33rd year of Guangxu, the Qing Dynasty allowed the Mongolian Company to resume its operation. The negotiations with the Mongols were conducted by a Jewish engineer who received the title of Baron under the Qing Dynasty and became Baron Zanzer in honor of Zanabazar, the first Bogd Gegen of Mongolia. He maintained a privileged friendship with the Bogd Khan.

The funds for the building was originally raised by the English Commercial Bank (Английн Худалдааны Банк) in 1902 and construction was completed in August 1905 with the Russo-Chinese Bank as its first tenant. Later the administration of Mongolor headed by Baron Victor von Grot moved into the building around 1910.

The Mongolor Building was where the Chinese soldiers of Xu Shuzheng made a last stand against the Cossack army of Roman von Ungern Sternberg in early 1921. Baron Ungern made the building his headquarters. He used the west wing as his office, the east wing as a place of interrogation and the basement as a prison.

After the People's Revolution in mid-1921 the School of the Red Pants was established with nine chosen students permanently stationed in the building. This institution later became the Military Academy.

The autopsy of Sukhbaatar was carried out inside the building on Feb 23, 1923.

In 1935 the contents of the 1921 military hospital on American Hill was carted east to its new location in the Mongolor Building. The hospital was named "Military Hospital of the Red Revolutionary Soldiers" and functioned as a surgical ward. In 1939 it received many wounded from the Battle of Khalkhin Gol.

From 1950 to 1957 the Skin Treatment Department of the hospital was located in the building and in 1957 was about to start a large-scale refurbishment when the Architectural Planning Authority of Ulaanbaatar intervened and stopped the refurbishment from taking place. It cited the building's historical value and its listing in the national registry. Demolition on the first floor was stopped and restored and only the second floor received a plastering and paint finish before the clinic moved in.

In 1977-78 foundation settling was identified on the southern part of the building. This was rectified with additional concrete reinforcement at the foundation level.

The building's current tenant is the Mong-Em Hospital which has operated for 30 years.

== Architecture ==
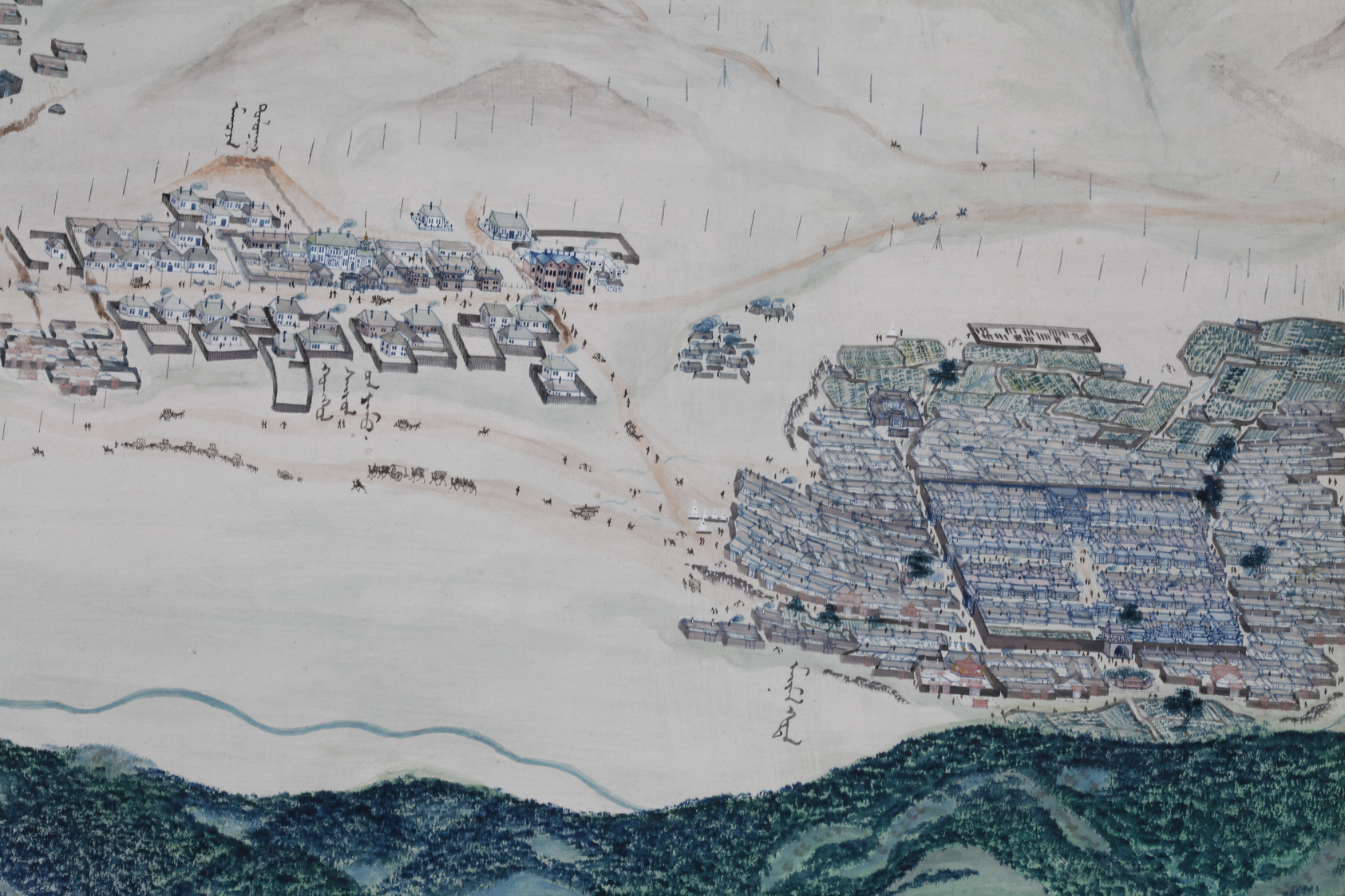
The Mongolor Building seen in Judger's 1913 painting of Niislel Khuree (Ulaanbaatar)

The building is two stories with an eastern and western wing. The door is framed by Dutch-style ornamentation.
