= List of tallest buildings in Mongolia =

Ulaanbaatar skyline viewed from Sükhbaatar Square in July 2025

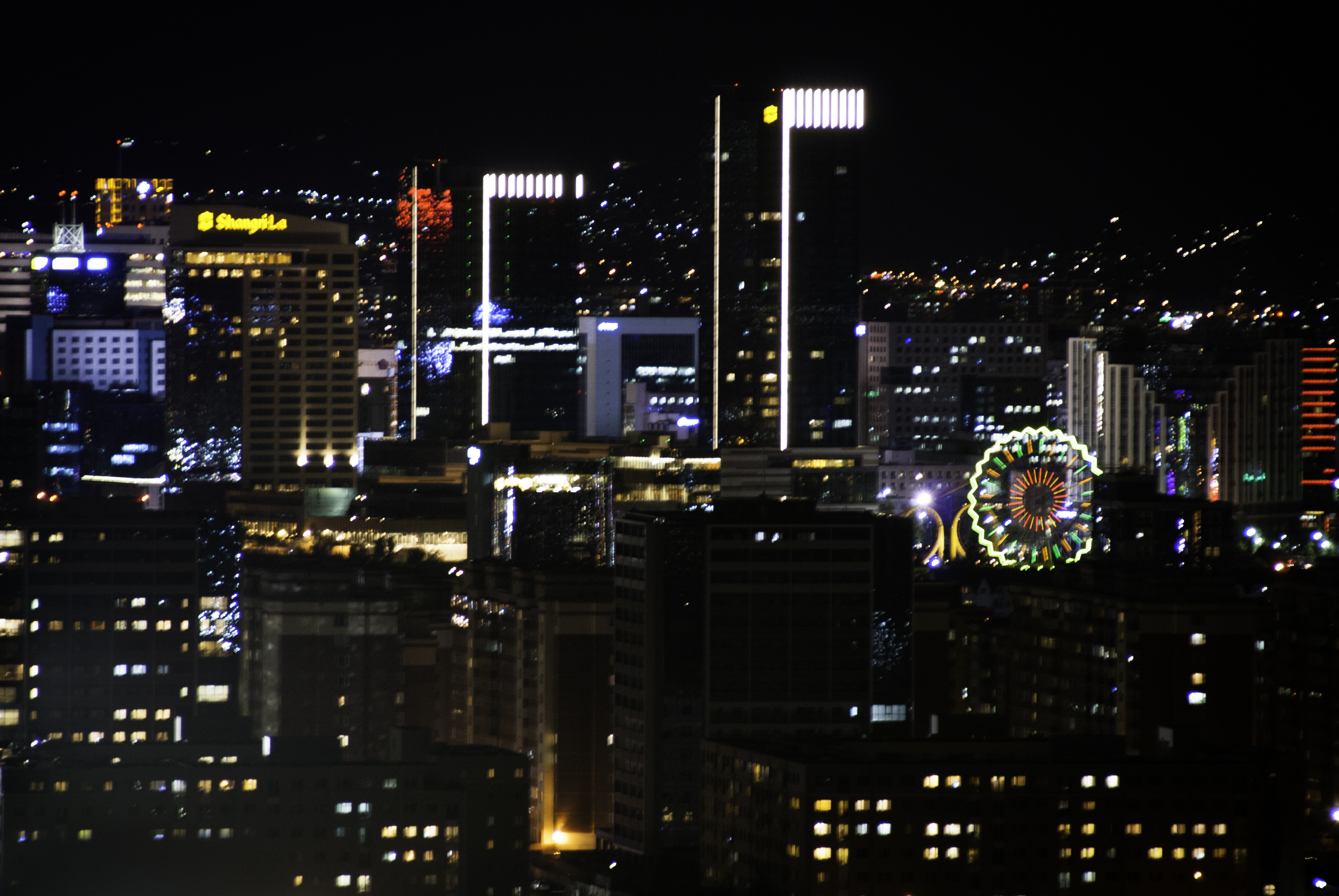
Ulaanbaatar skyline at night

This list of the tallest buildings in Mongolia ranks skyscrapers and high-rises in the country by their height.

The history of industrialization in Mongolia officially commenced during the 1930s under the administration of the Mongolian People's Republic. This movement led to a significant expansion of large-scale building construction throughout the 1960s and 1970s, which ultimately established the modern urban core of the capital city, Ulaanbaatar.

By the conclusion of the socialist era, the tallest building in Mongolia was a 16-story residential apartment complex located in the industrial city of Darkhan, which reached completion in 1985. It held the title of the tallest building in the country for 24 years until 2009, when the Central Tower in Ulaanbaatar surpassed it.

Unlike other countries in East Asia, Mongolia has a very limited number of skyscrapers and the fewest skyscrapers in the region, featuring fewer than 20 buildings taller than 100 m (328 ft) and only two taller than 150 m (492 ft). It is also the only country in East Asia without a single supertall skyscraper, which is defined as a building over 300 m (984 ft). This is primarily due to a low population, challenging ground conditions, and high engineering costs. As of 2026, the tallest building in Mongolia is Eco Tower One. Having topped out in September 2026, the skyscraper reaches a height of 243 m (797 ft) and encompasses 55 floors.

Following the Mongolian Revolution of 1990, the construction of urban structures containing between 9 and 12 floors increased significantly across the country, while larger developments exceeding 16 floors began appearing more frequently after 2010. Under official Mongolian building code legislation and urban planning standards, high-rise buildings are explicitly defined as those reaching a minimum height of 17 floors or more.

The Kherlen Bars Khot archaeological site in Dornod Province features an 11th-century Khitan period brick pagoda that stands as the tallest surviving pre-modern building in Mongolia. Although the octagonal tower missing its original top section historically stood higher across seven floors, it reaches a current physical height of 16.5 m (54 ft) following comprehensive structural restoration efforts.

== Tallest buildings ==
Was the tallest building in Mongolia upon completion
Indicates buildings that have been topped out but not yet completed

This list ranks skyscrapers and high-rises in Mongolia that stand at least 300 ft (91 m) tall, based on standard height measurement. This includes spires and architectural details but excludes antenna masts. The "Year" column indicates the year in which a building was completed. An equal sign following a rank indicates the same height between two or more buildings. Estimated heights are shown in italics.

Rank	Name	Image	City	Height m (ft)	Floors	Year	Notes	References
1	Eco Tower One		Ulaanbaatar	243 m (797 ft)	55	2028	Tallest building in Mongolia since topping out in September 2026. Formerly known as Hero Palace Tower.	
2	Encanto Trade Center		Ulaanbaatar	150 m (492 ft)	35	2026	Tallest building in Mongolia for a brief period in 2026. Tallest completed building in Mongolia. Tallest building completed in Mongolia in the 2020s.	
3	Shangri-La Ulaanbaatar Tower C		Ulaanbaatar	136 m (446 ft)	34	2016	Tallest building in Mongolia from 2016 to 2026. Tallest building completed in Mongolia in the 2010s. Also known as Peak Vue Residences. Part of the Shangri-La Ulaanbaatar.	
4	MCS Tower		Ulaanbaatar	121 m (397 ft)	23	2025	Tallest office building in Mongolia.	
5	Soyombo Tower		Ulaanbaatar	120 m (394 ft)	32	2015	Tallest building in Mongolia from 2015 to 2016.	
6	Eco International Tower		Ulaanbaatar	119 m (390 ft)	26	2022		
7	Altan Joloo Tower		Ulaanbaatar	115 m (377 ft)	26	2024		
8	Khan Bank Tower		Ulaanbaatar	112 m (367 ft)	24	2017		
9	Best Western Premier Tuushin Hotel		Ulaanbaatar	109 m (358 ft)	25	2013	Tallest hotel in Mongolia. Tallest building in Mongolia from 2013 to 2015.	
10=	Shangri-La Ulaanbaatar Tower B		Ulaanbaatar	108 m (354 ft)	24	2016	Part of the Shangri-La Ulaanbaatar.	
10=	Khurd Tower		Ulaanbaatar	108 m (354 ft)	24	2015		
12	Central Tower		Ulaanbaatar	107.5 m (353 ft)	17	2009	Originally planned to open as a Shangri-La hotel, it was later converted into an office building before completion. Tallest building in Mongolia from 2009 to 2013. Tallest building completed in Mongolia in the 2000s.	
13	Blue Sky Tower		Ulaanbaatar	105 m (344 ft)	25	2010	2nd-tallest building in Mongolia at the time of its completion.	
14=	Bella Vista Tower 1		Ulaanbaatar	100 m (328 ft)	22	2014	Tallest residential building in Mongolia, tied in height with Towers 2, 3, and 4.	
14=	Bella Vista Tower 2		Ulaanbaatar	100 m (328 ft)	22	2014		
14=	Bella Vista Tower 3		Ulaanbaatar	100 m (328 ft)	22	2014		
14=	Bella Vista Tower 4		Ulaanbaatar	100 m (328 ft)	22	2014		
14=	International Commercial Center		Ulaanbaatar	100 m (328 ft)	21	2013	Also known as Tsat Building.	
19	Mandala Tower		Ulaanbaatar	98.6 m (323 ft)	25	2022		
20	Shangri-La Ulaanbaatar Tower A		Ulaanbaatar	91.5 m (300 ft)	19	2015	Fire broke out on the 7th floor on September 30, 2014, during construction. Part of the Shangri-La Ulaanbaatar.	

== Under construction ==
Indicates that construction on the building is currently halted

Name	City	Height m (ft)	Floors	Estimated Completion	Notes
MAK Tower	Ulaanbaatar	203.5 m (668 ft)	44	2029	Upon completion, it will become the second-tallest building in Mongolia after Eco Tower One.
Zaisan Tower	Ulaanbaatar	130+ m (427+ ft)	30+	—	
Ulaanbaatar International Finance Center	Ulaanbaatar	113 m (371 ft)	26	—	
Vision Business Tower	Ulaanbaatar	104 m (341 ft)	25	2027	

== Proposed ==
Name	City	Height m (ft)	Floors	Estimated Completion	Notes
Mongol Tower	Ulaanbaatar	301 m (988 ft)	68	—	If built, it would become Mongolia's first supertall skyscraper and tallest building. Designed by Nikken Sekkei, the skyscraper will feature luxury residences, a top-class hotel, Grade A offices, and an observation deck. As of 2026, the project remains in the proposal stage with no groundbreaking date announced.
Ulaanbaatar Complex Center	Ulaanbaatar	200+ m (656+ ft)	44	—	Designed by Mooyoung Architects & Engineers.
Stella Vista Tower 1	Ulaanbaatar	200 m (656 ft)	45	—	
Stella Vista Tower 2	Ulaanbaatar	200 m (656 ft)	45	—	
Stella Vista Tower 3	Ulaanbaatar	200 m (656 ft)	45	—	
Stella Vista Tower 4	Ulaanbaatar	200 m (656 ft)	45	—	
International Cultural Park Tower	Ulaanbaatar	150+ m (492+ ft)	40+	—	Designed by GanGoo Architects and Engineers LLC.
UB Capital Tower 1	Ulaanbaatar	104 m (341 ft)	20	—	
UB Capital Tower 2	Ulaanbaatar	104 m (341 ft)	20	—	

== Unbuilt ==
Name	City	Height m (ft)	Floors	Notes
Morin Khuur Tower	Ulaanbaatar	309 m (1,014 ft)	30	Designed by D. Erdembileg to promote and honor Mongolia's unique cultural heritage and the spiritual significance of the morin khuur. Construction of the project was originally scheduled to begin in 2013 and be completed by 2017, but due to severe structural delays, the project never moved forward and was ultimately scrapped. As of 2026, the Tsengeldekh Apartment Complex now occupies the site.
One UB Plaza	Ulaanbaatar	300.8 m (987 ft)	66	Envisioned by Cagni Williams in 2011, the building was planned to feature 180,000 m^{2} (1,937,504 sq ft) of premium residential, office, hotel, retail, and parking space, alongside a large enclosed leisure and recreational area. The project is classified as an unrealized conceptual proposal.
Hero Palace Tower	Ulaanbaatar	201 m (659 ft)	50	Now built as Eco Tower One.
Hyatt Regency Hotel Mongol	Ulaanbaatar	200 m (656 ft)	41	Replaced by MAK Tower.

== Timeline of tallest buildings ==
This section provides a list of buildings that once held the title of tallest building in Mongolia. Prior to 2009, the tallest building in the nation was a 16-story residential apartment complex located in Darkhan, which reached completion in 1985. This socialist-era record was broken by the completion of the Central Tower, a commercial office skyscraper rising to a height of 107.5 m (353 ft) in downtown Ulaanbaatar.

Name	City	Image	Years As Tallest	Height m (ft)	Floors	Notes
16 Davhar	Darkhan		1985–2009	~50 m (164 ft)	16	Tallest building in Mongolia outside of Ulaanbaatar. Although its exact height remains unknown, it is widely considered to have been the tallest building in Mongolia at the time of its completion.
Central Tower	Ulaanbaatar		2009–2013	107.5 m (353 ft)	17	First building in Mongolia to reach 100 m (328 ft) in height.
Best Western Premier Tuushin Hotel	Ulaanbaatar		2013–2015	109 m (358 ft)	25	
Soyombo Tower	Ulaanbaatar		2015–2016	120 m (394 ft)	32	
Shangri-La Ulaanbaatar Tower C	Ulaanbaatar		2016–2026	136 m (446 ft)	34	
Encanto Trade Center	Ulaanbaatar		2026–2026	150 m (492 ft)	35	First building in Mongolia to reach 150 m (492 ft) in height.
Eco Tower One	Ulaanbaatar		2026–Present	243 m (797 ft)	55	First building in Mongolia to reach 200 m (656 ft) in height.

== See also ==
- List of tallest structures in Mongolia
