= Shangri-La Ulaanbaatar Complex =

Skyscrapers in Sükhbaatar, Ulaanbaatar, Mongolia

Shangri-La Ulaanbaatar
- Шангри-Ла Улаанбаатар
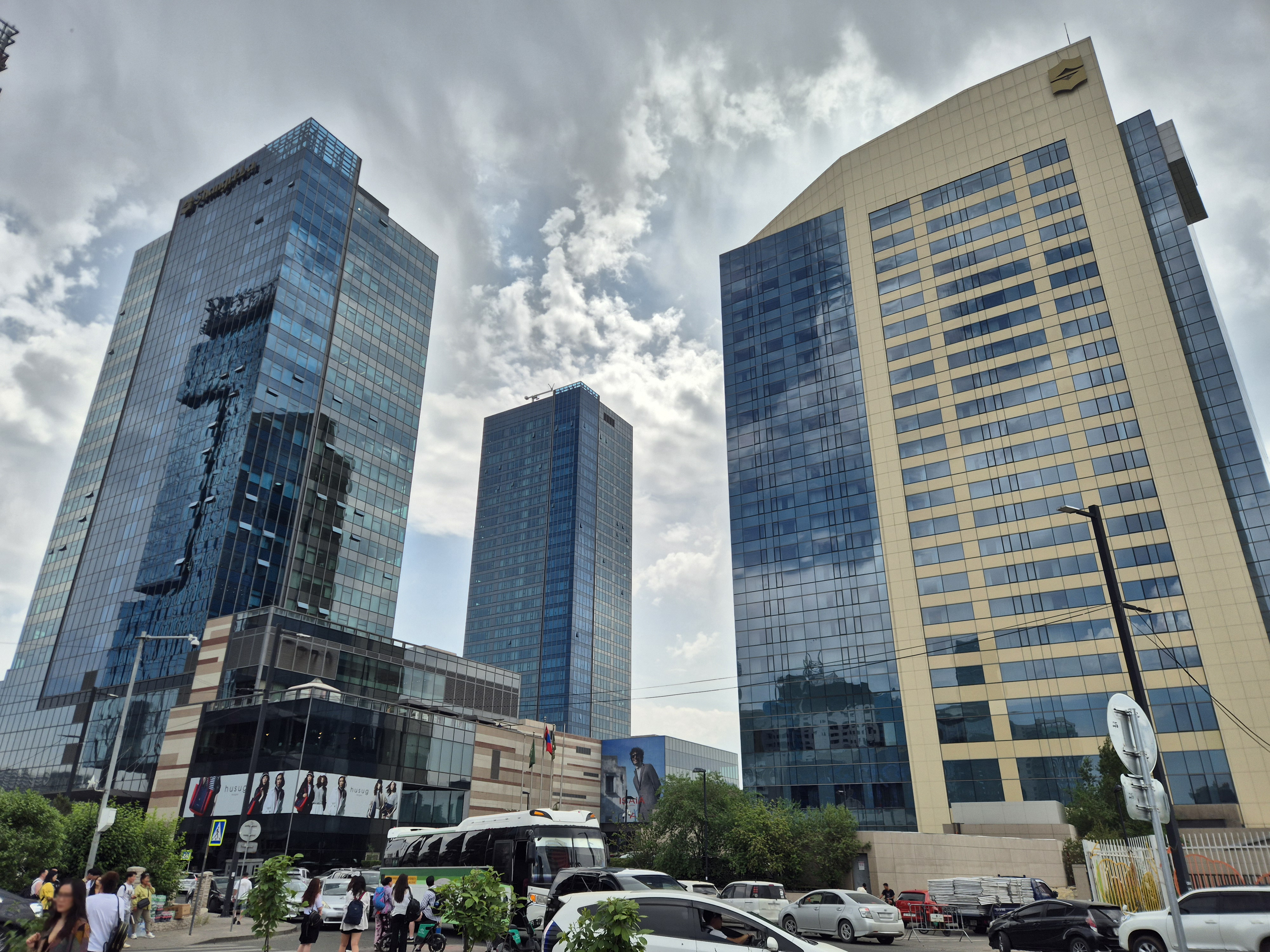
- Interactive map of the Shangri-La Ulaanbaatar area

General information
- Status: Completed
- Type: Mixed-use
- Location: Sükhbaatar, Ulaanbaatar, Mongolia, Olympic Street 19, Ulaanbaatar 14241
- Coordinates: 47°54′47.1″N 106°55′15.9″E
- Completed: 2016
- Cost: $500,000,000
- Owner: Shangri-La Hotels and Resorts

Height
- Roof: Tower C: 136 m (446 ft); Tower B: 108 m (354 ft); Tower A: 91.5 m (300 ft)

Technical details
- Floor count: Tower C: 34; Tower B: 24; Tower A: 19

Design and construction
- Architects: Wong Tung & Partners (Tower A); Farrells (Tower C)
- Structural engineer: WSP Hong Kong Ltd. (Tower C)

Website
- Official Website

The Shangri-La Ulaanbaatar (Mongolian: Шангри-Ла Улаанбаатар) is a mixed-use hotel and commercial complex located within the Sükhbaatar District of Ulaanbaatar, Mongolia. The complex comprises three primary skyscrapers configured around a central retail podium. Among these structures, Tower C reached completion in 2016 and ranks as the second-tallest building in Mongolia. It is surpassed only by the Encanto Trade Center, which stands at a height of 150 m (492 ft). Tower C rises to an architectural height of 136 m (446 ft) and encompasses 34 stories. Tower A reaches an architectural height of 91.5 m (300 ft) across 19 floors, while Tower B stands at 108 m (354 ft) and encompasses 24 floors. The integrated shopping mall occupies the intersecting base levels of the development.

== History ==
The comprehensive master plan for the development was structured for execution across two primary phases. The initial phase reached completion in 2014, anchored by the opening of Tower A, a 91.5 m (300 ft) building configured as a 275-room luxury hotel asset. The subsequent phase rolled out between 2015 and 2016, delivering the 108 m (354 ft) commercial corporate facility designated as Tower B, the 136 m (446 ft) hospitality tower operating as a 300-room hotel variant under Tower C, and the adjoining five-story retail shopping center. The complete real estate asset portfolio is owned by Shangri-La Hotels and Resorts, representing a total capital investment of 500 million dollars.

In September 2014, a structural fire broke out within Tower A during its active construction phase. Emergency response teams successfully extinguished the blaze within two hours, and the local authorities reported no injuries or fatalities resulting from the incident.

== See also ==
- List of tallest buildings in Mongolia
