= List of tallest structures in Mongolia =

This is a list of the tallest structures in Mongolia.

Rank	Name	Name in Mongolian	Pinnacle height	Location	Coordinates	Remarks	Reference
1	Bayan-Ölgii Province longwave radio broadcast mast	Баян-Өлгий аймгийн радио өргөн нэвтрүүлгийн урт долгионы цамхаг	352.5 m	Ölgii, Bayan-Ölgii	48.956814 N 89.970276 E	used for broadcasting on 207 kHz	
2	National Radio Broadcasting Center, Longwave Mast	Хонхор дахь Улсын радио нэвтрүүлэх төвийн цамхаг	305.8 m	Ulaanbaatar	47.798584 N 107.187416 E	used for broadcasting on 162 kHz	
3	Dornod Province Longwave Mast	Дорнод аймгийн радио өргөн нэвтрүүлгийн станцын цамхаг	271.4 m	Dornod	48.004752 N 114.454880 E	used for broadcasting on 207 kHz	
4	Dornod Province Mediumwave Mast		260.7 m	Dornod	48.005766 N 114.435198 E		
5	Dalanzadgad Longwave Broadcasting Mast		260.7 m	Dalanzadgad	43.531815 N 104.411569 E	used for broadcasting on 207 kHz	
6	Govi-Altai Province Longwave Mast	Говь-Алтай аймгийн радио өргөн нэвтрүүлгийн станцын цамхаг	260.4 m	Govi-Altai	46.319730 N 96.251966 E		
7	National Radio Broadcasting Center, Mediumwave Mast	Хонхор дахь Улсын радио нэвтрүүлэх төвийн цамхаг	258.1 m	Ulaanbaatar	47.801333 N 107.182260 E		
8	Thermal Power Plant No. 4 chimney	Улаанбаатар хотын 4 дүгээр Дулааны цахилгаан станцын яндан	250 m	Ulaanbaatar	47.894755 N 106.803830 E		
9	Eco Tower One	Эко Тауэр Ван	243 m	Ulaanbaatar	47°54'57.4"N 106°54'53.2"E	Tallest building in Mongolia	
10	Mongolian National Public Radio and Television antenna	Монголын үндэсний олон нийтийн радио телевизийн антен	193 m	Ulaanbaatar	47.928291 N 106.888363 E	Lattice tower of 3803 KM type	

== See also ==
- List of tallest buildings in Mongolia
