= National Garden Park (Ulaanbaatar) =

Park in Bayanzürkh, Ulaanbatar, Mongolia

- Үндэсний Цэцэрлэгт Хүрээлэн
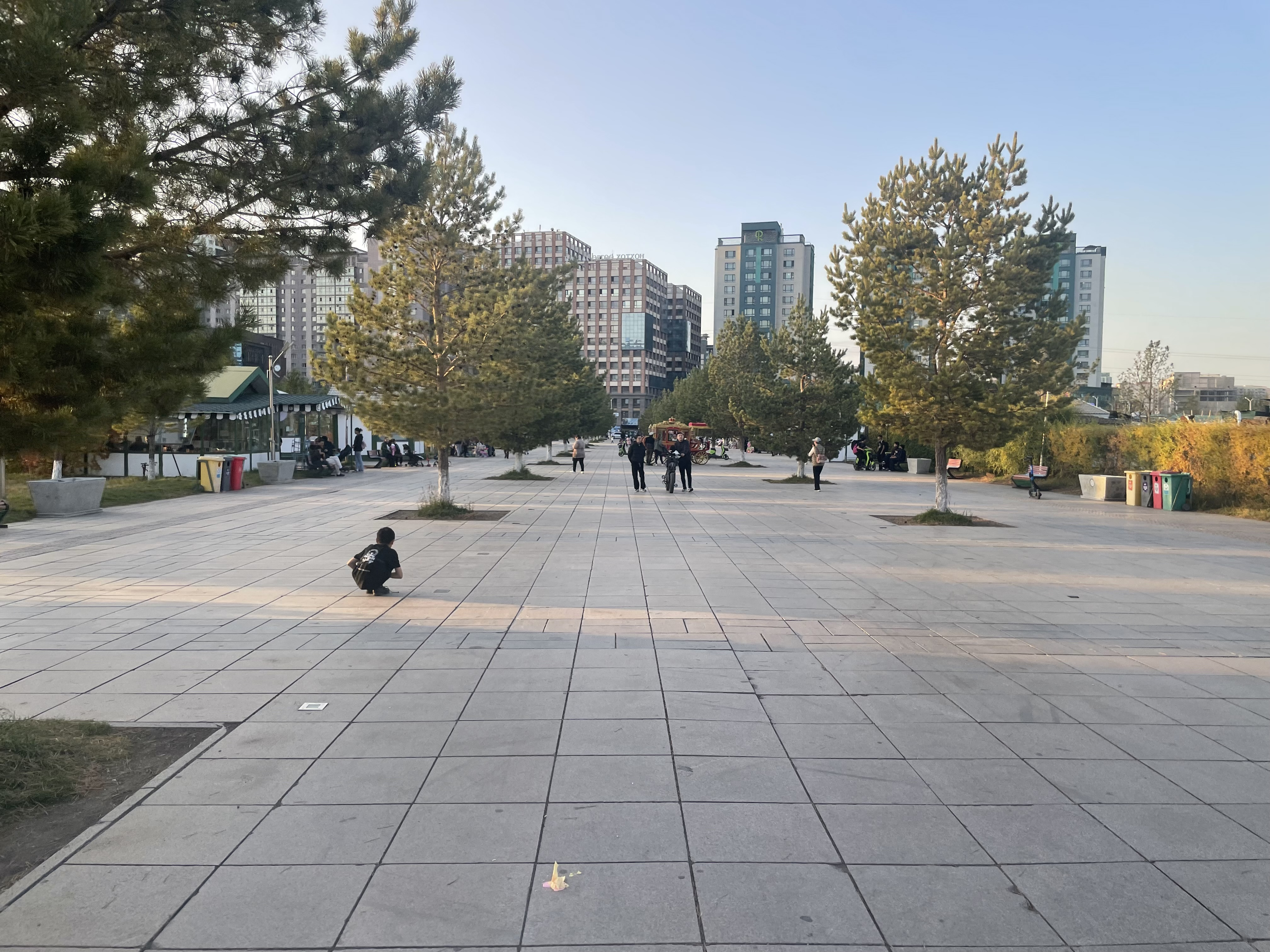
- Interactive map of National Garden Park
- Type: park
- Location: Bayanzürkh, Ulaanbaatar, Mongolia
- Coordinates: 47°54′01″N 106°56′36″E
- Area: 183 hectares (450 acres)
- Established: 2009

The National Garden Park (Mongolian: Үндэсний Цэцэрлэгт Хүрээлэн) is a park in Bayanzürkh, Ulaanbaatar, Mongolia. It is the largest park in the city.

== History ==
The planning to establish the park started with the decision of the Capital City Citizens' Representatives' Meeting and Decree No. 230 of 2009 issued by the Capital Governor and the mayor of Ulaanbaatar. The park was then established in 2009.

On 12 October 2019, around 1,500 trees were planted at the park. The event was attended by Parliament Speaker Gombojavyn Zandanshatar. In 2016, the park was designed as a local property budgetary enterprise under the administration of the Assembly of Citizen's Representatives. On 21 May 2020, the Garden of Friendship was established at the park to commemorate 60th anniversary of the diplomatic relations between Mongolia and Cuba. The ceremony was attended by Mongolia Minister of Foreign Affairs and Ambassador of Cuba to Mongolia. In 2022, the groundbreaking ceremony to construct a Miner's Garden in the park was held to mark the 100th anniversary of the mining in Mongolia.

== Geography ==
The park has a total area of 183 hectares. It covers 23% of the greenspace of the city.

== Architecture ==
The park features various facilities, such as jogging track, bicycle lane, sport areas, children playground, shops etc.

== Gallery ==
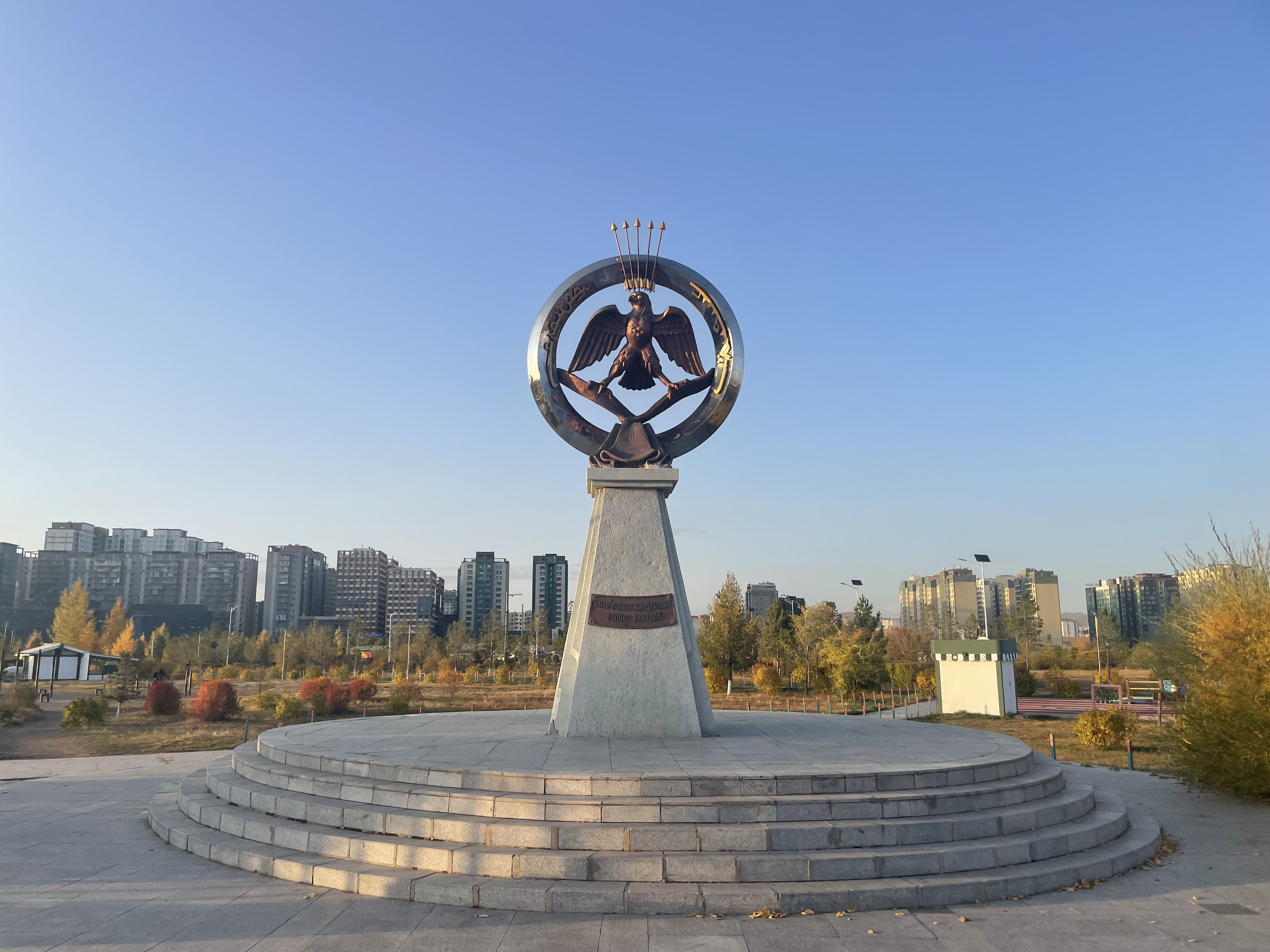
Monument

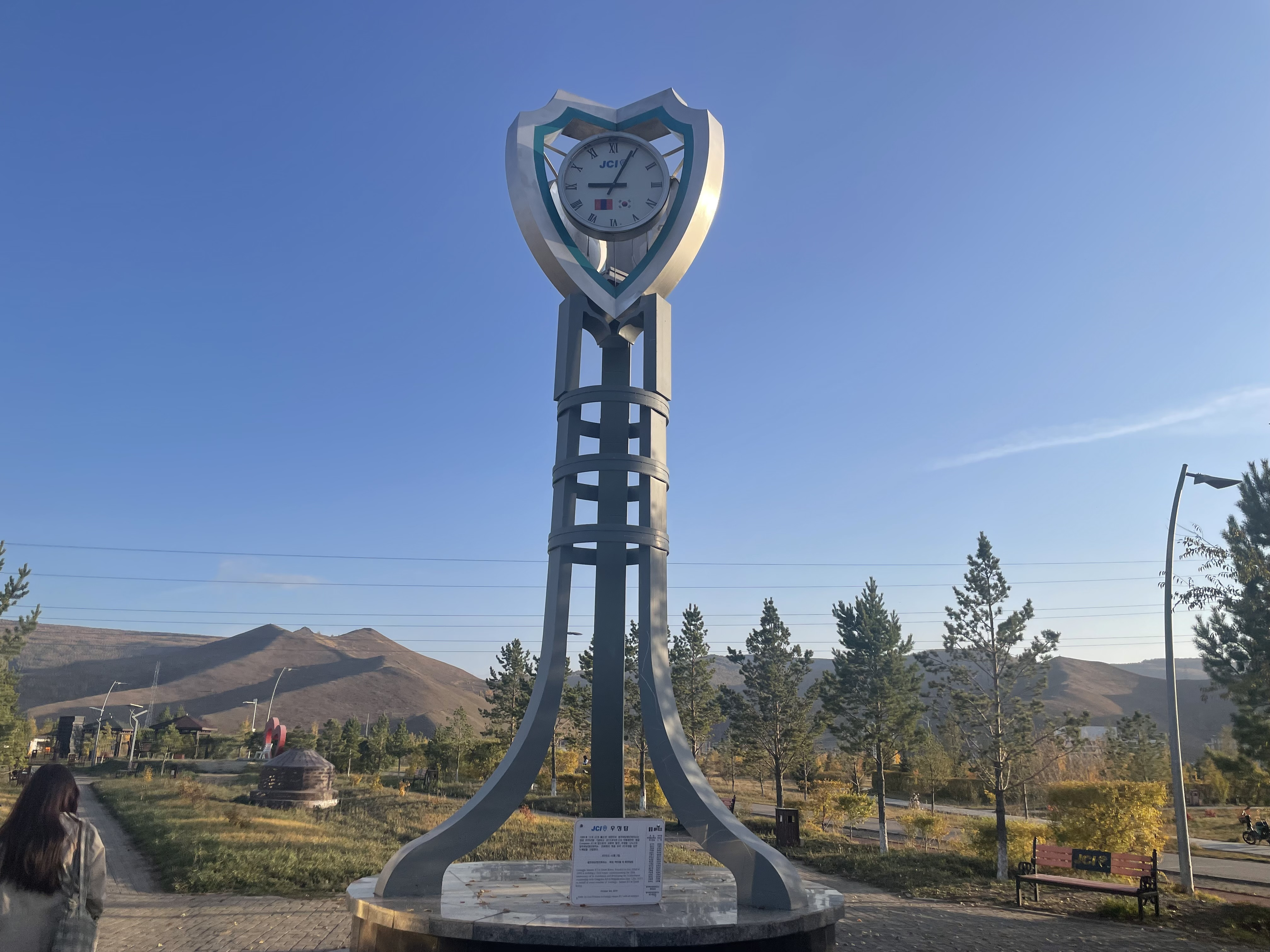
Clock monument

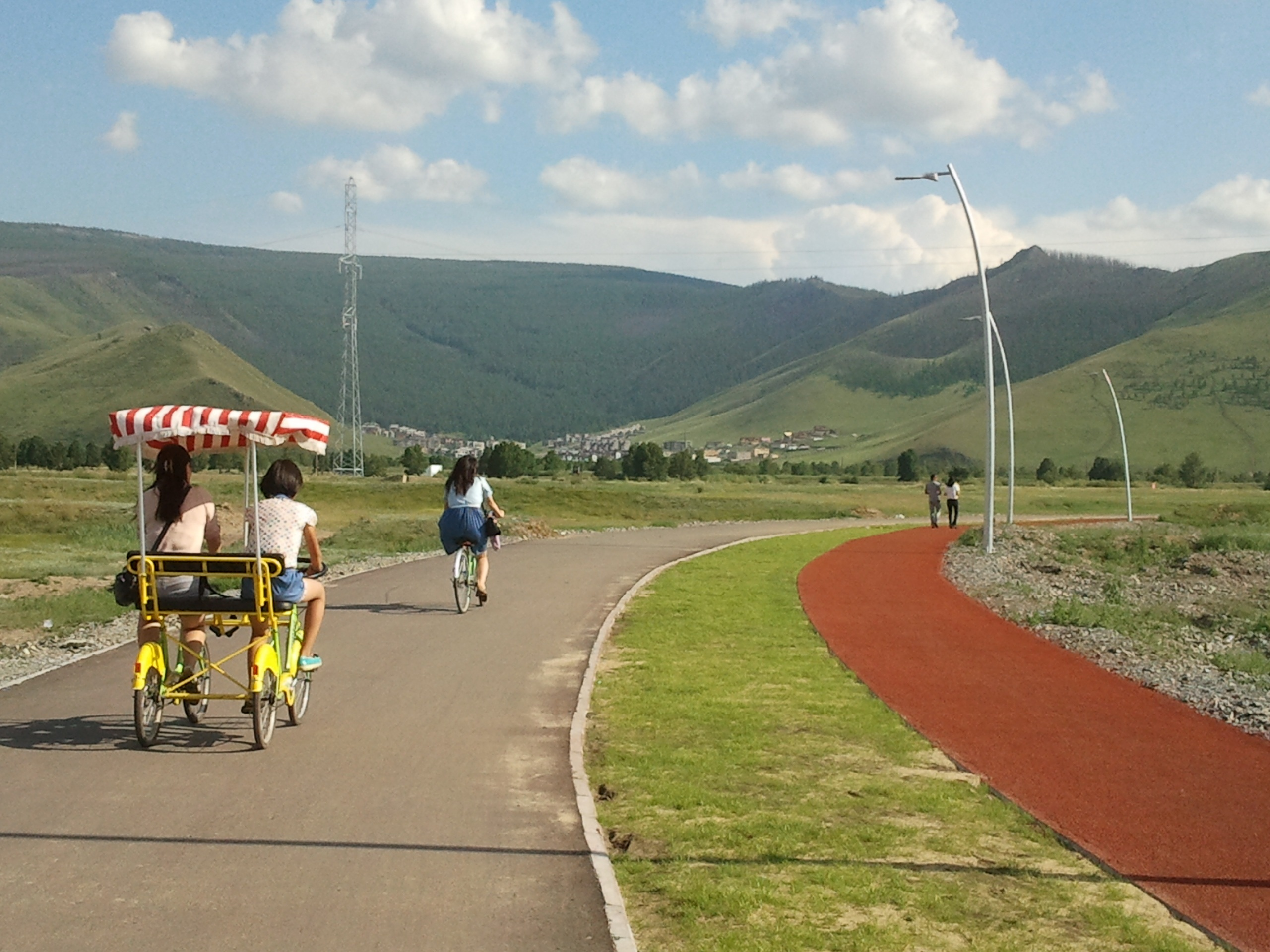
Cycling and walking path

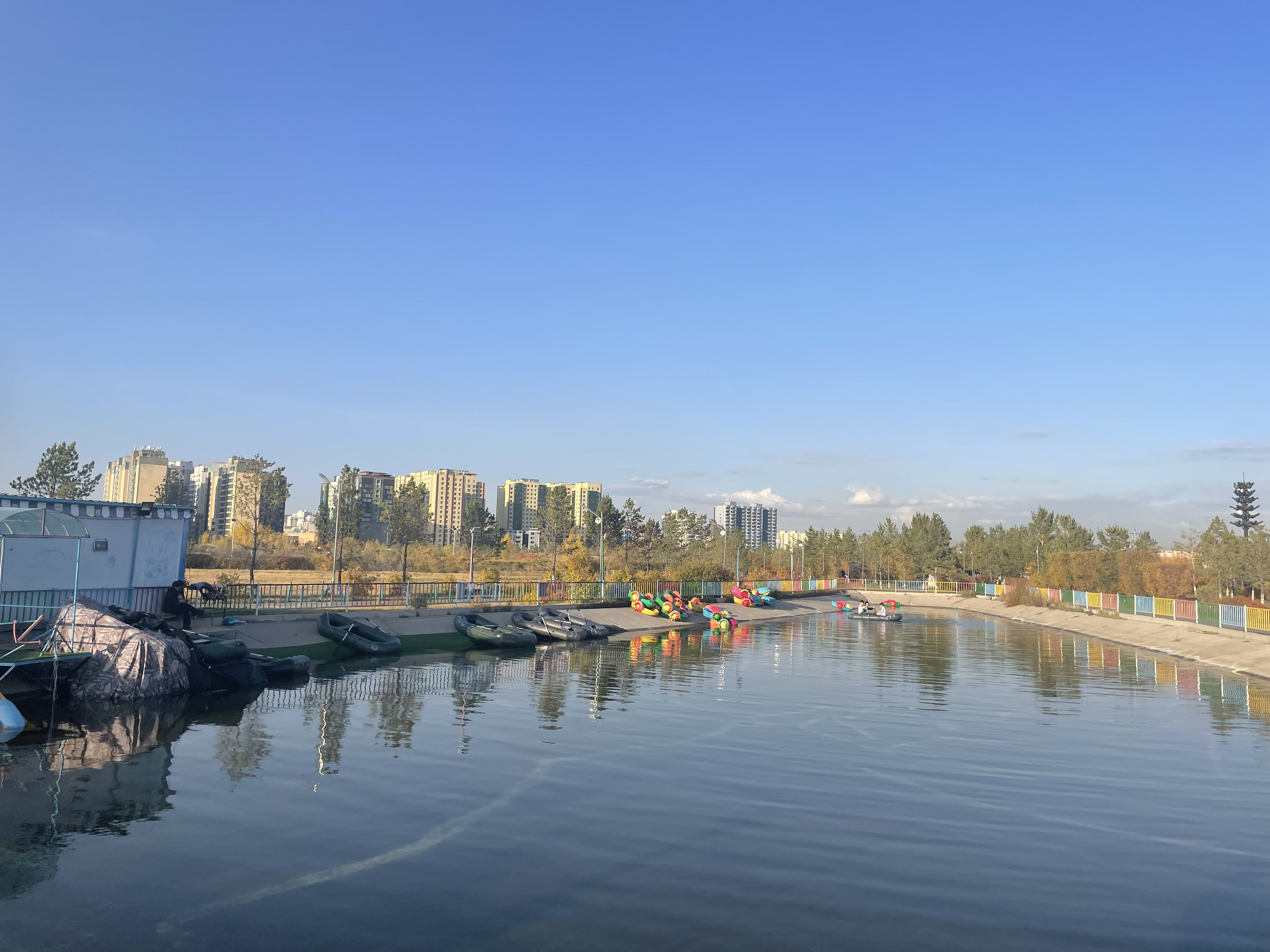
Boating lake

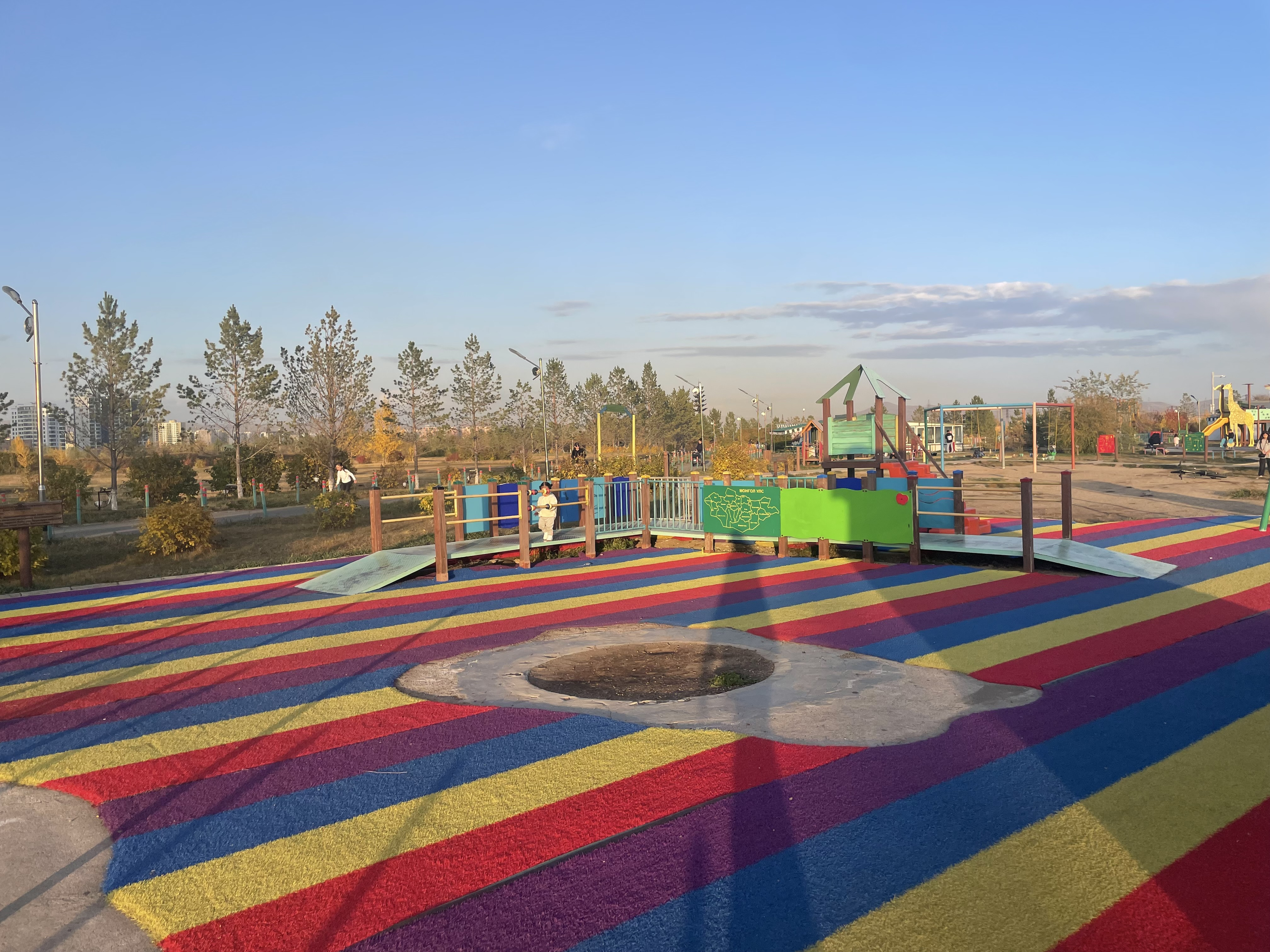
Playground

== See also ==
- Geography of Mongolia
