= Mongolia–Japan Hospital of MNUMS =

University hospital in Bayanzürkh, Ulaanbaatar, Mongolia

Mongolia–Japan Hospital of MNUMS Монгол-Япон Эмнэлэг

Geography
- Location: Bayanzürkh, Ulaanbaatar, Mongolia
- Coordinates: 47°54′42.1″N 106°59′43.6″E

Organisation
- Type: university hospital
- Affiliated university: Mongolian National University of Medical Sciences

History
- Founded: 1 October 2019

Links
- Website: Official website

The Mongolia–Japan Hospital of MNUMS (Mongolian: Монгол-Япон Эмнэлэг) is a university hospital in Bayanzürkh, Ulaanbaatar, Mongolia. It is the first university hospital in Mongolia.

== History ==
The hospital was originally opened on 1 October 2019 with the name Mongolia–Japan Teaching Hospital as the first university hospital in Mongolia. The opening ceremony of the hospital was attended by Vice Minister of Health Byambasuren Lamjav. On 9 February 2022, the hospital was transferred from the Ministry of Education and Science to Mongolian National University of Medical Sciences. In September 2024, the hospital received various medical equipment and ambulance.

== Finance ==
The hospital was built with funds from the Japan International Cooperation Agency.

== See also ==
- List of hospitals in Mongolia
- Health in Mongolia
- Japan–Mongolia relations
