= Darkhan General Hospital =

Public hospital in Darkhan, Darkhan-Uul, Mongolia

Darkhan General Hospital Дархан нэгдсэн эмнэлэг
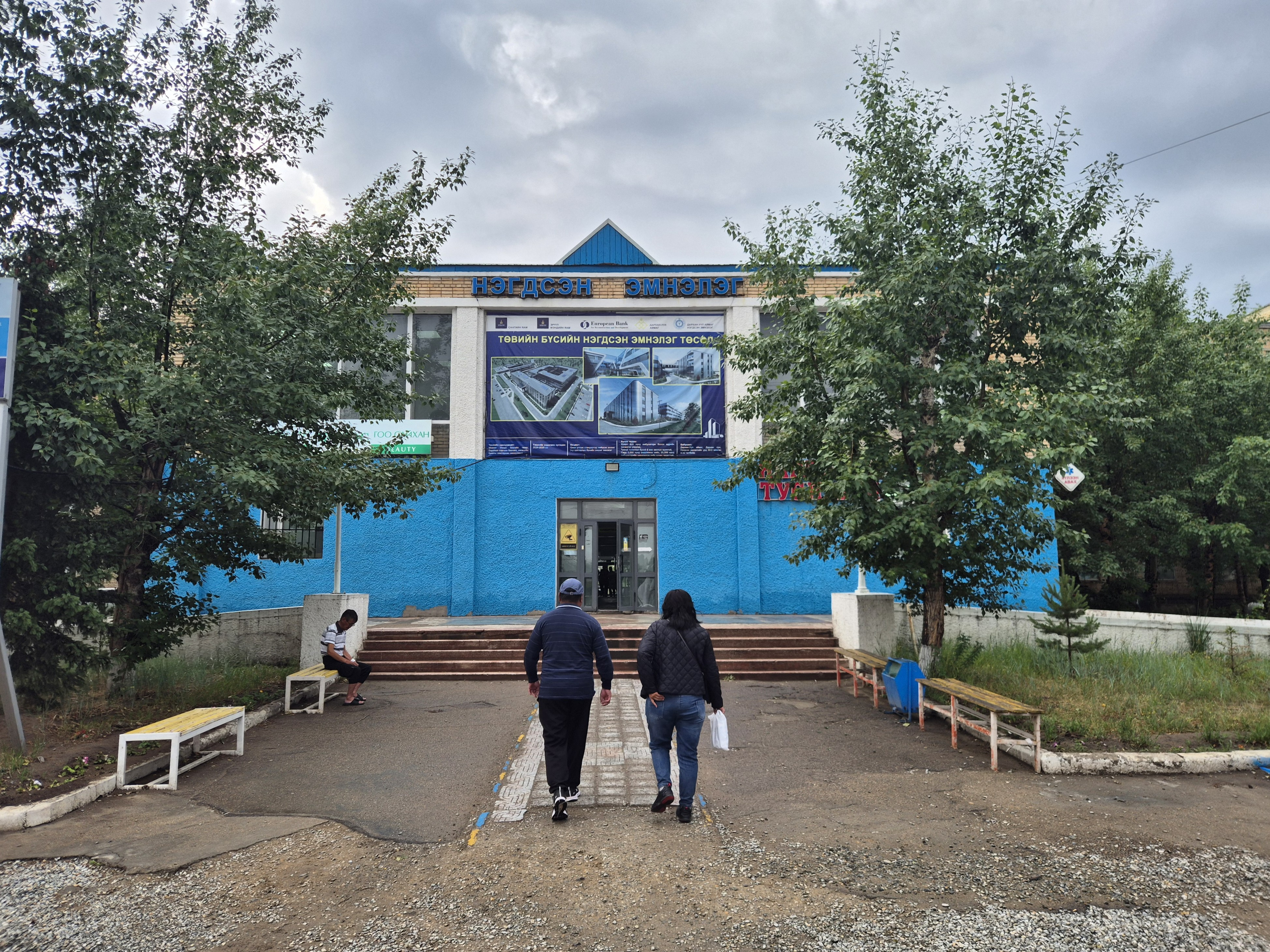

Geography
- Location: Darkhan, Darkhan-Uul, Mongolia
- Coordinates: 49°27′22.6″N 105°57′58.5″E

Organisation
- Type: public hospital

History
- Founded: 1972

Links
- Website: Official website (in Mongolian)

The Darkhan General Hospital (Mongolian: Дархан нэгдсэн эмнэлэг) is a public hospital in Darkhan, Darkhan-Uul Province, Mongolia.

== History ==
The hospital was built in 1972.

== See also ==
- List of hospitals in Mongolia
- Health in Mongolia
