= Children's Palace (Ulaanbaatar) =

Educational center in Sükhbaatar, Ulaanbaatar, Mongolia

- Монголын Хүүхдийн Ордон
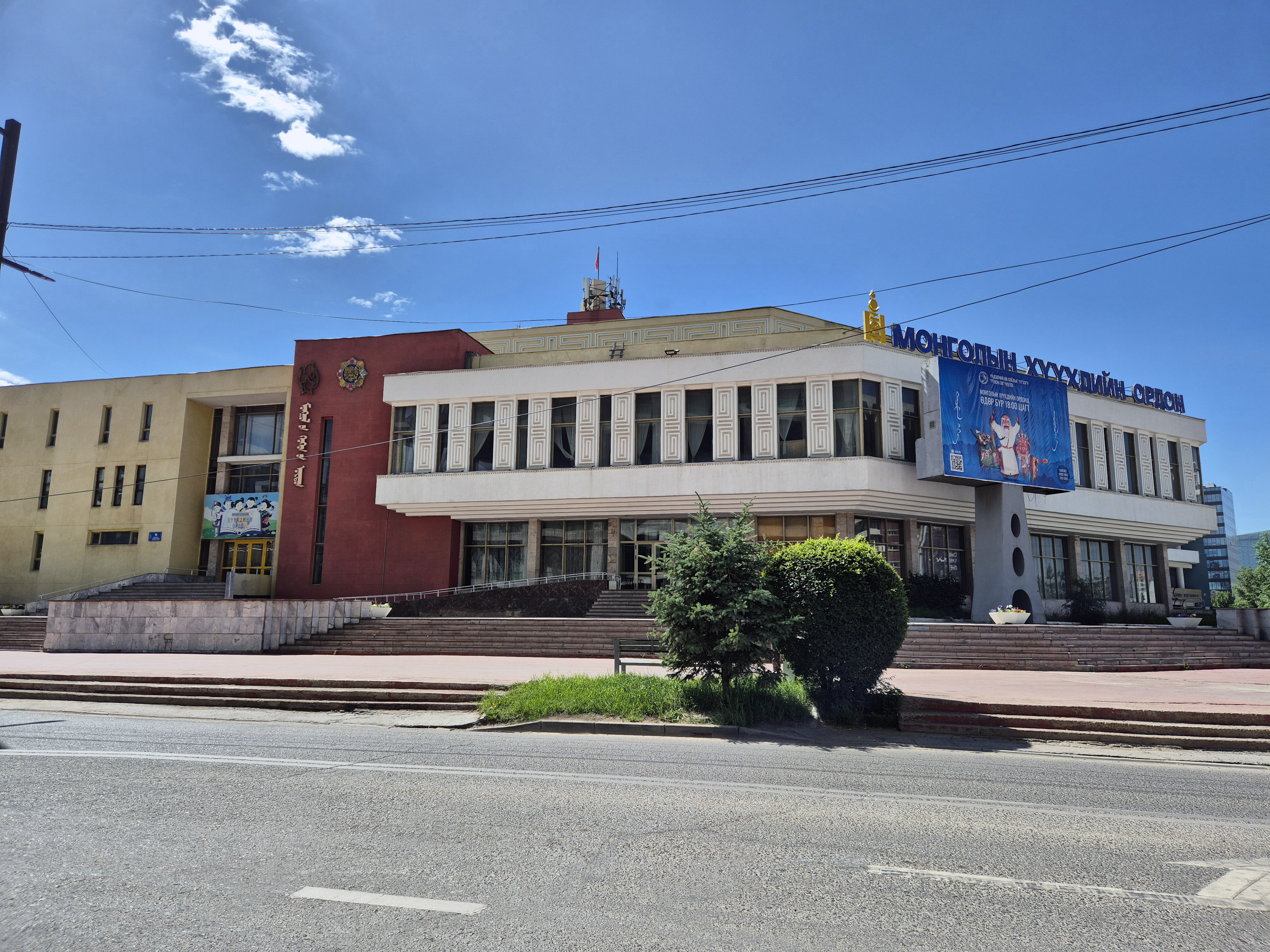
- Interactive map of the Children's Palace area

General information
- Location: Sükhbaatar, Ulaanbaatar, Mongolia
- Coordinates: 47°34′24.1″N 107°47′40.3″E
- Opened: 19 October 1958

The Children's Palace (Mongolian: Монголын Хүүхдийн Ордон) is an educational center in Sükhbaatar, Ulaanbaatar, Mongolia.

== History ==
The center was opened on 19 October 1958. On 19 October 2018, the government announced the allocation of MNT200 million for the repair works and renovation of the center.

== Programs ==
The center offers various type of education to children, ranging from pure arts, performing arts, foreign languages etc. with a total of 32 courses.

== See also ==
- Education in Mongolia
