= Khövsgöl Province General Hospital =

Public hospital in Mörön, Khövsgöl, Mongolia

Khövsgöl Province General Hospital Хөвсгөл Aймгийн Нэгдсэн Эмнэлэг

Geography
- Location: Mörön, Khövsgöl, Mongolia

Organisation
- Type: public hospital

Services
- Beds: 355

History
- Founded: 1971

Links
- Website: Official website (in Mongolian)

The Khövsgöl Province General Hospital (Mongolian: Хөвсгөл Aймгийн Нэгдсэн Эмнэлэг) is a public hospital in Mörön, Khövsgöl Province, Mongolia.

== History ==
The hospital was established in 1971. On 9 January 2024, the hospital signed an agreement with the Government of Japan, who will fund the cost for the renovation of the hospital with a cost of MNT853 million.

== Technical specifications ==
The hospital consists of 18 departments. It has 355 beds and employs 344 medical staffs.

== See also ==
- List of hospitals in Mongolia
- Health in Mongolia
