= Beatles Square =

Beatles Square may refer to:

- Beatles-Platz, a public square in Hamburg, Germany
- Beatles Square (Ulaanbaatar), a public square in Ulaanbaatar, Mongolia
