= General Hospital of Bayan-Ölgii Province =

Public hospital in Ölgii, Bayan-Ölgii, Mongolia

General Hospital of Bayan-Ölgii Province Баян-Өлгий Aймгийн нэгдсэн эмнэлэг

Geography
- Location: Ölgii, Bayan-Ölgii, Mongolia
- Coordinates: 48°57′56.5″N 89°58′32.9″E

Organisation
- Type: public hospital

History
- Founded: 1974

Links
- Website: Official website (in Mongolian)

The General Hospital of Bayan-Ölgii Province (Mongolian: Баян-Өлгий Aймгийн нэгдсэн эмнэлэг) is a public hospital in Ölgii, Bayan-Ölgii Province, Mongolia.

== History ==
The hospital was built in 1974.

== See also ==
- List of hospitals in Mongolia
- Health in Mongolia
