= MRCS =

MRCS can refer to:

- Mongolian Red Cross Society
- Malaysian Red Crescent Society
- Myanmar Red Cross Society
- Membership of the Royal Colleges of Surgeons of Great Britain and Ireland
