= Dashchoilin Monastery =

Monastery in Sükhbaatar, Ulaanbaatar, Mongolia

Dashchoilin Monastery Дашчойлин хийд 达希柴隆寺
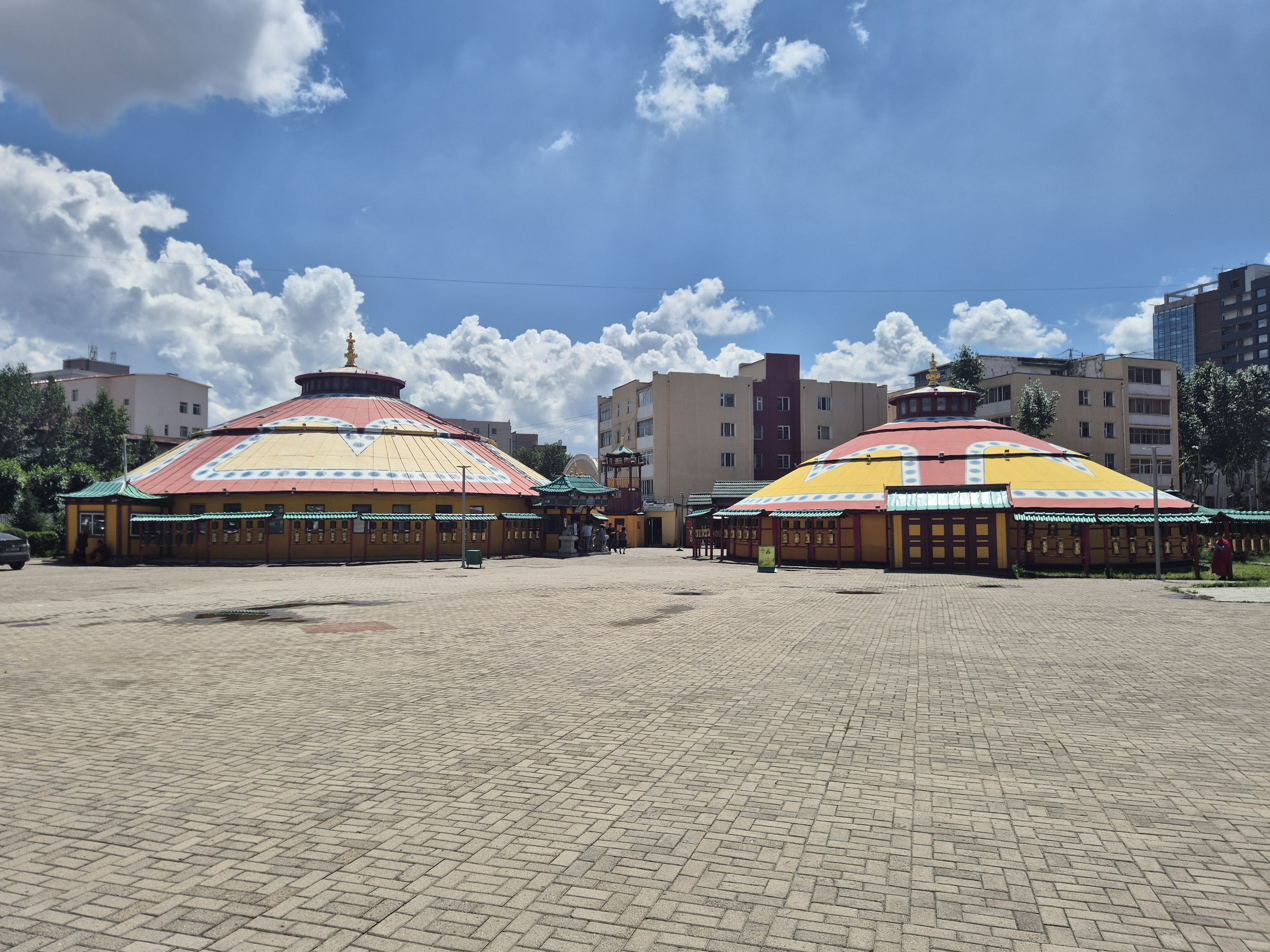

- Location within Mongolia

Religion
- Affiliation: Tibetan Buddhism

Location
- Location: Sükhbaatar, Ulaanbaatar, Mongolia
- Country: Mongolia
- Interactive map of Dashchoilin Monastery; Дашчойлин хийд 达希柴隆寺
- Coordinates: 47°35′39″N 106°55′14″E

Architecture
- Style: Chinese, Mongol and Tibetan influences
- Established: 1737

The Dashchoilin Monastery (Mongolian: Дашчойлин хийд) is a Buddhist monastery in Sükhbaatar District, Ulaanbaatar, Mongolia, the second largest in the city.

== History ==
The modern Dashchoilin Monastery traces its roots to one of the two largest monastic complexes of old Urga — Gandantegchinlen and the Eastern Khure—and was built on the site of two temples belonging to the latter—Erkhem and Vangai. In 1737 , ten years after Tsambeldorj, the third son of the Dzasak-noyon of the Tüsheet Khan aimag, succeeded his father, Rampildorj, due to illness and became a monk under the name Danzanyarimpil. Because he founded a temple with a permanent service, in which he placed all the relics inherited from his ancestors, the 2nd Jebtsundamba Khutuktu bestowed upon him the title of Erkhem-toyn ("Venerable Monk"), and the temple became known by this title. The main yidam of this temple was Vajrayogini, and the main dharmapala was Tsambashadag.

In 1740, Sanzaidorj, the dzasak of the Tushetu Khan aimag, founded a temple in Ikh-Khure, which he presented to the 2nd Jebtsundamba Khutuktu in 1757. A monastic aimag (a community of monks) was assigned to it, initially founded by a man with the title of zhongwan. This aimag became known as the aimag of Wang-guai, and this name eventually evolved into "Wangai." The temple's main yidam was Vajrapani, and its guardian dharmapala was the six-armed Mahakala; the aimag at the temple numbered up to 400 people.

The buildings of these temples, like all other structures of the Eastern Khure, were destroyed during the repressions of the 1930s. After the democratic reforms in the country, three concrete yurts, originally built for the State Circus on the site of the old monastery, were given over to the monastery.

== Current state ==
The modern Dashchoilin Monastery, also known as Dzun-khure (Eastern Khure), is currently the second largest in Mongolia's capital and includes three temples—the cathedral (formerly Vangai), the Dharmapala Temple (formerly Erkhem-toiny-aimag), and the Gandanchoinkhorlin Temple (founded in 2000), as well as a primary Buddhist school and a library. In the monastery courtyard are three stupas, built in 2000, surrounding the Sahyusan Temple, a large complex of nine stupas built in 1990. To the right of the Sahyusan Temple is a Buddha statue, built in 2007. Opposite the cathedral temple is a small building for butter lamps. The monastery plans to restore the 16-metre-tall Maitreya statue and the temple that housed it, which were destroyed during the repressions of the 1930s.
