= Khuree Maternity Hospital =

Maternity hospital in Sükhbaatar, Ulaanbaatar, Mongolia

Khuree Maternity Hospital Хүрээ Aмаржих Газар
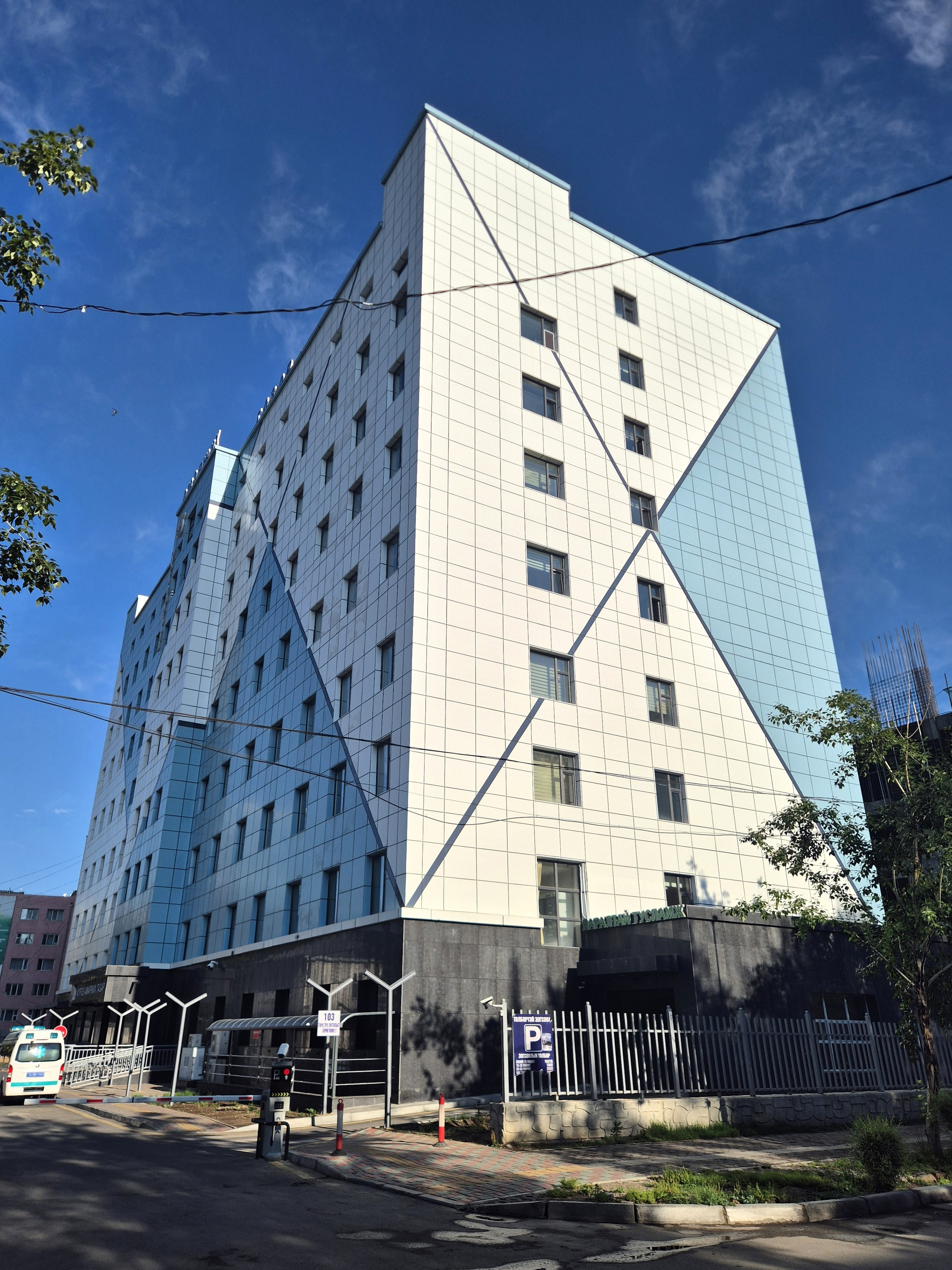

Geography
- Location: Sükhbaatar, Ulaanbaatar, Mongolia
- Coordinates: 47°54′51.0″N 106°54′06.1″E

Organisation
- Type: maternity hospital

Services
- Beds: 180

History
- Founded: 1959

Links
- Website: Official website (in Mongolian)

The Khuree Maternity Hospital (Mongolian: Хүрээ Aмаржих Газар) or Second Maternity Hospital is a maternity hospital in Sükhbaatar District, Ulaanbaatar, Mongolia.

== History ==
The hospital was originally established in 1959. On 7 October 2022, the hospital started to undergo expansion with a total budget of MNT45 billion. In November 2024, a new nine-story building of the hospital was put into operation.

== Technical specifications ==
The hospital has a total of 180 beds.

== See also ==
- List of hospitals in Mongolia
- Health in Mongolia
