= Arkhangai General Hospital =

Public hospital in Tsetserleg, Arkhangai, Mongolia

Arkhangai General Hospital Архангай Нэгдсэн Эмнэлэг

Geography
- Location: Tsetserleg, Arkhangai, Mongolia

Organisation
- Type: public hospital

Services
- Beds: 200

History
- Founded: 1979

Links
- Website: Arkhangai General Hospital on Facebook

The Arkhangai General Hospital (Mongolian: Архангай Нэгдсэн Эмнэлэг) is a public hospital in Tsetserleg, Arkhangai Province, Mongolia.

== History ==
The hospital was established in 1979. In 2019, the hospital signed an agreement with Japan for a renovation of the building. In 2023, the new building of the hospital is being constructed. The current old hospital building will be turned into nursing training, research, health care and service complex.

== Technical specifications ==
The hospital has a total capacity of more than 200 beds.

== See also ==
- List of hospitals in Mongolia
- Health in Mongolia
