= National Art Gallery of Mongolia =

Art museum in Sükhbaatar, Ulaanbaatar, Mongolia

Coordinates: 47°55′10.9″N 106°55′16.4″E

- Монголын Уран Зургийн Галерей
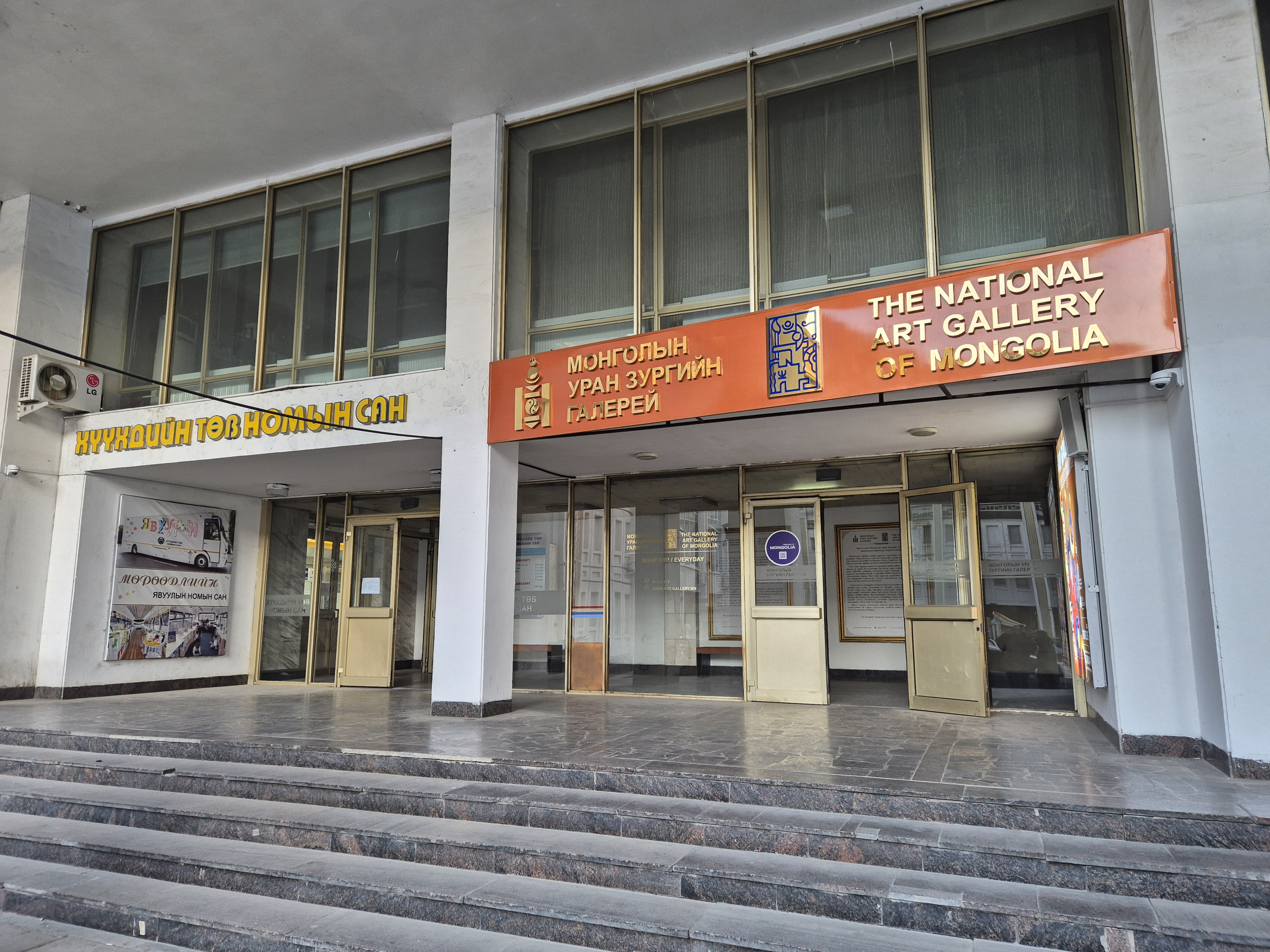
- Location: Sükhbaatar, Ulaanbaatar, Mongolia
- Type: Modern art gallery
- Website: art-gallery.mn/en

The National Art Gallery of Mongolia (Mongolian: Монголын Уран Зургийн Галерей) is a government-supported art gallery in Sükhbaatar District, Ulaanbaatar, Mongolia. It exhibits Mongolian modern art. There are about 4200 pieces in the museum's permanent collection, with only 7-8% being on display. The museum is constantly collecting new pieces. In addition, the museum also organizes temporary exhibitions and also shows them aboard.

== History ==
The gallery separated from the Fine Arts Museum of Mongolia in 1991. In 2020, 17 paintings were transferred here from the Green Palace, where they had been kept since 1986. Prior to 1986, the 17 works were located at the Fine Arts Zanabazar Museum.
