= Mongolian Railway History Museum =

Museum in Sükhbaatar, Ulaanbaatar, Mongolia

- Монголын төмөр замын түүхийн музей
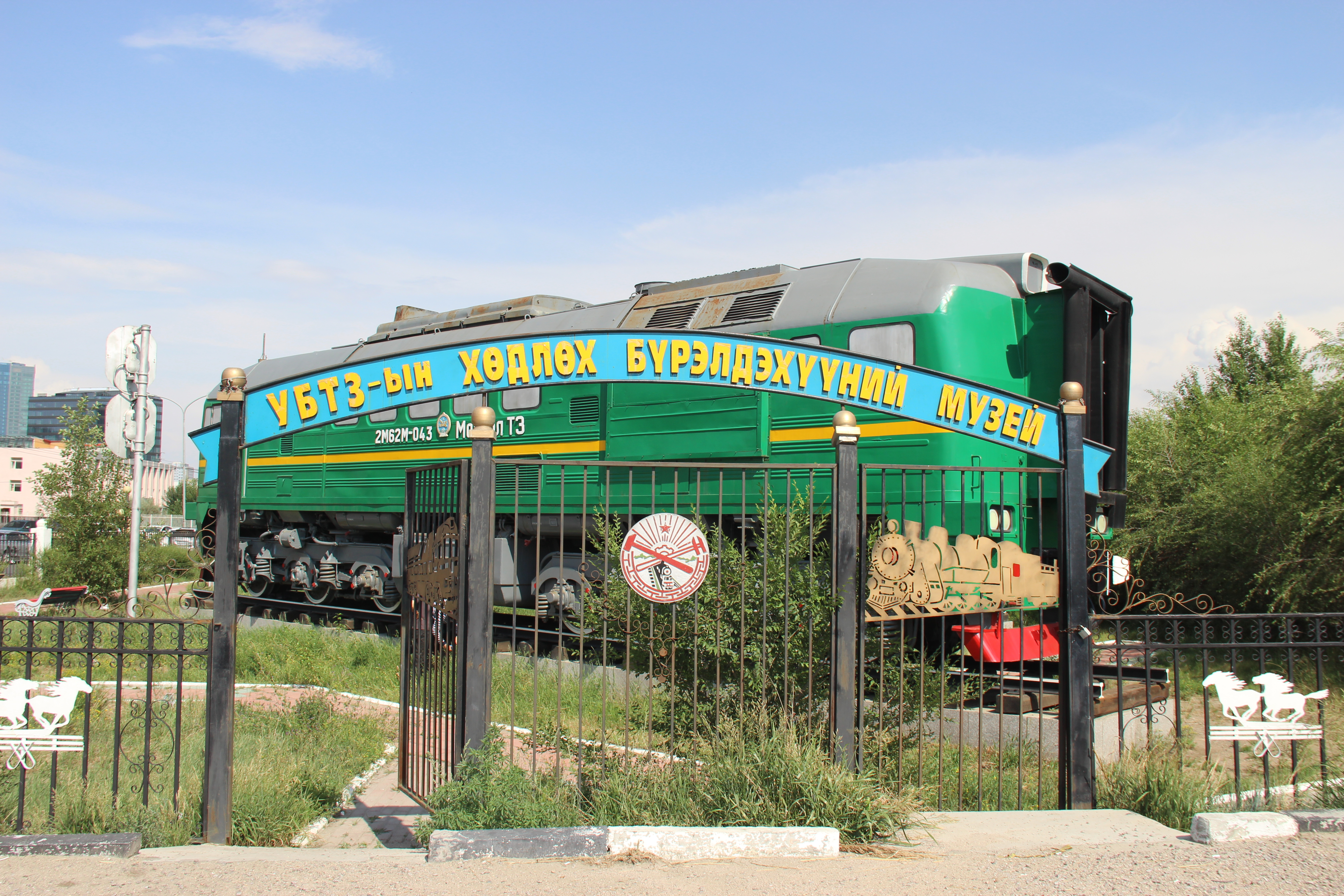
- Established: 1970
- Location: Sükhbaatar, Ulaanbaatar, Mongolia
- Coordinates: 47°54′29.2″N 106°54′31.6″E
- Type: railway museum

The Mongolian Railway History Museum (Mongolian: Монголын төмөр замын түүхийн музей) is a railway museum in Sükhbaatar, Ulaanbaatar, Mongolia.

== History ==
The museum was originally opened in 1970. In 1983, the museum was closed and relocated to its current location. In 2019, the museum was renovated.

== Exhibitions ==
The museum showcases a number of old locomotives which were used throughout Mongolian railway history. It also houses various collections of artifacts, photographs and interactive displays about the rail transport of the country over the years.

== Transportation ==
The museum is accessible within walking distance east of Ulaanbaatar railway station.

== See also ==
- List of museums in Mongolia
- Trans-Mongolian Railway
