= Lkhagvyn Tsedevsuren =

Mongolian politician

Lkhagvyn Tsedevsuren Мember of Government

(Mongolia) Minister of Education and Science
- In office 8 July 2020 – 21 January 2021
- Prime Minister: Ukhnaagiin Khürelsükh
- Preceded by: Yondonperenlein Baatarbileg (Minister of Education, Culture, Science and Sports of Mongolia)

(Mongolia) State Secretary of Ministry of Education, Culture, Science and Sports
- In office 31 December 2019 – 8 July 2020
- Preceded by: Baljinnyamyn Bayarsaikhan
- Succeeded by: Daadankhuugiin Batbaatar (State Secretary of Ministry of Education, Culture, Science and Sports of Mongolia)

Personal details
- Born: 1967 (age 58–59) Mongolia, Govi-Altai Province
- Party: Mongolian People's Party
- Education: Irkutsk State University; National University of Mongolia

Lkhagvyn Tsedevsuren (Mongolian: Лхагвын Цэдэвсүрэн) is a Mongolian politician currently serving as Minister of Education and Science since July 2020.
