= First Central Hospital of Mongolia =

Public hospital in Sükhbaatar, Ulaanbaatar, Mongolia

First Central Hospital of Mongolia Улсын Нэгдүгээр Төв Эмнэлэг
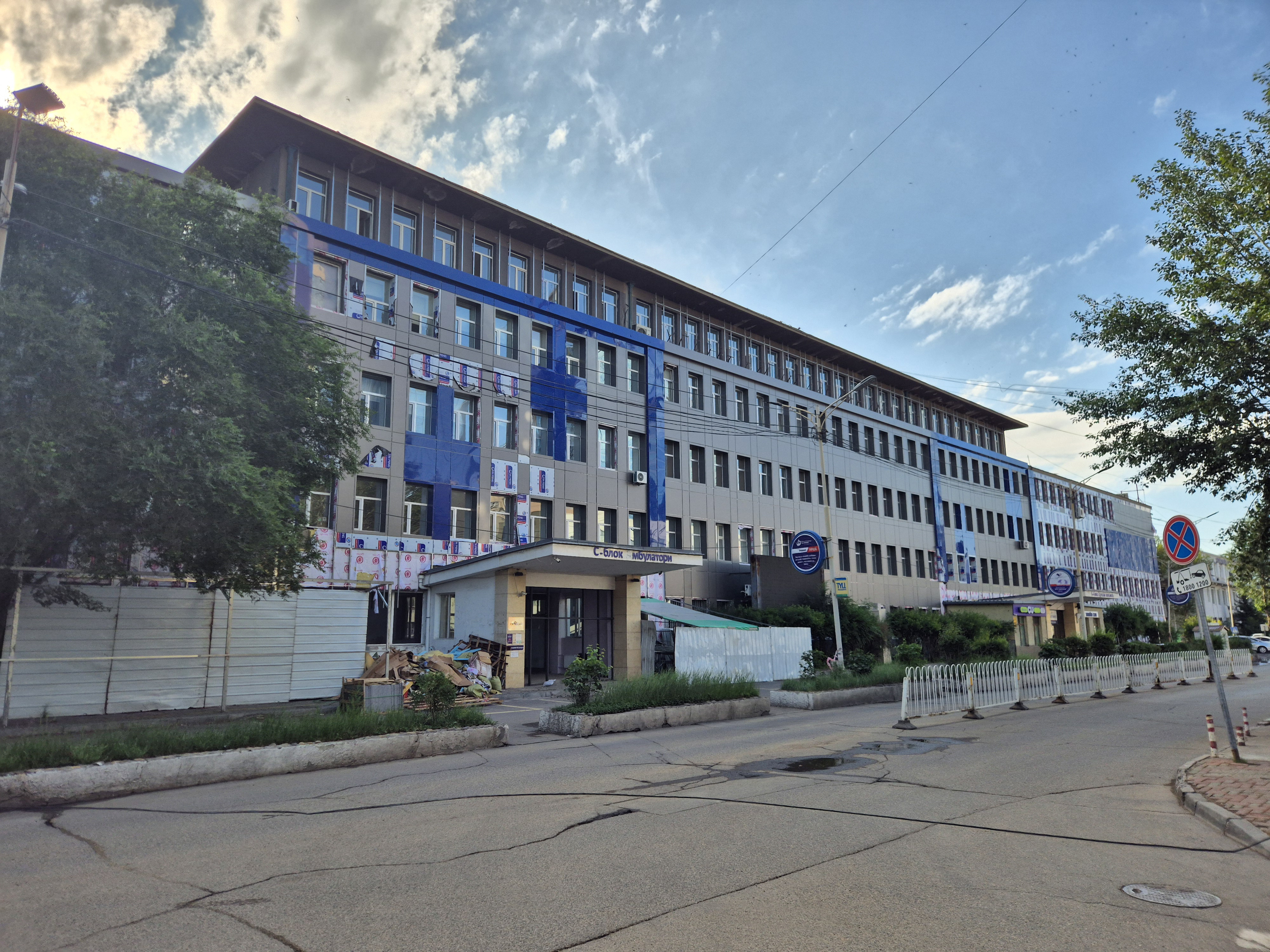

Geography
- Location: Sükhbaatar, Ulaanbaatar, Mongolia
- Coordinates: 47°54′59.0″N 106°55′28.1″E

Organisation
- Type: public hospital

Services
- Beds: 568

History
- Founded: 1925

Links
- Website: Official website

The First Central Hospital of Mongolia (Mongolian: Улсын Нэгдүгээр Төв Эмнэлэг) is a public hospital in Sükhbaatar District, Ulaanbaatar, Mongolia.

== History ==
The hospital was established in 1925. In January 2020, the hospital opened its clinical research and training center. In June 2020, the hospital opened its hospital ambulatory pharmacy. On 22 June 2020, the hospital opened its health promotion center, diagnostic and treatment center.

== Capacity ==
The hospital has a total of 568 beds. It employs around 800 staffs.

== See also ==
- List of hospitals in Mongolia
- Health in Mongolia
