= National Cancer Center of Mongolia =

Medical center in Bayanzürkh, Ulaanbaatar, Mongolia

National Cancer Center of Mongolia Хавдар Судлалын Үндэсний Төв
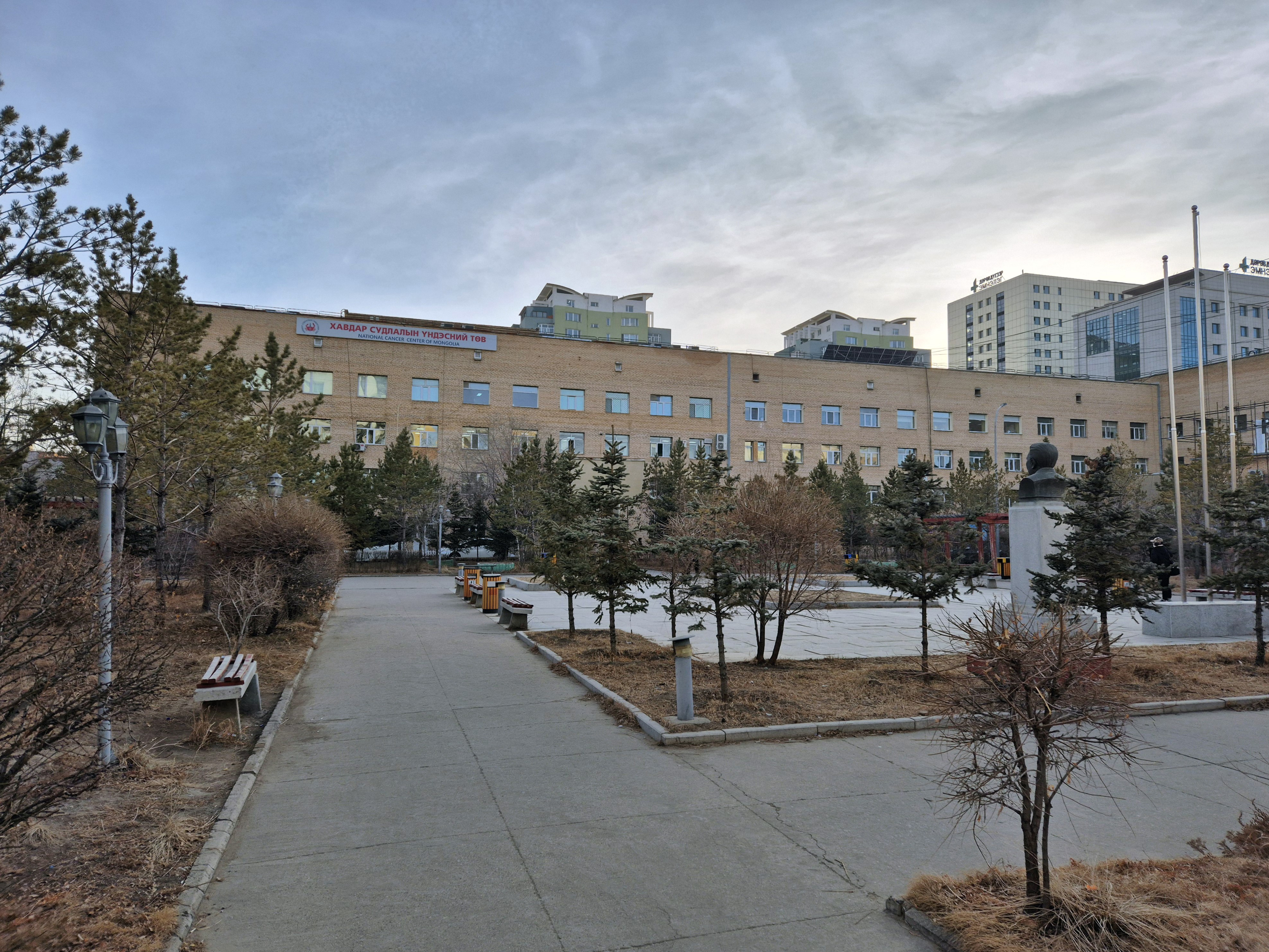

Geography
- Location: Bayanzürkh, Ulaanbaatar, Mongolia
- Coordinates: 47°54′50.1″N 106°56′29.4″E

History
- Former name: State Radiotherapy Hospital
- Opened: 1961

Links
- Website: Official website

The National Cancer Center of Mongolia (NCC; Mongolian: Хавдар Судлалын Үндэсний Төв) is a medical center in Bayanzürkh District, Ulaanbaatar, Mongolia.

== History ==
The center was originally established in 1961 as State Radiotherapy Hospital. In 1982, the center moved to its current building.

== Architecture ==
The center covers a total area of 6,118 m^{2}.

== See also ==
- Health in Mongolia
