= Galleria Ulaanbaatar =

Shopping mall in Sükhbaatar, Ulaanbaatar, Mongolia

- Галлериа Улаанбаатар
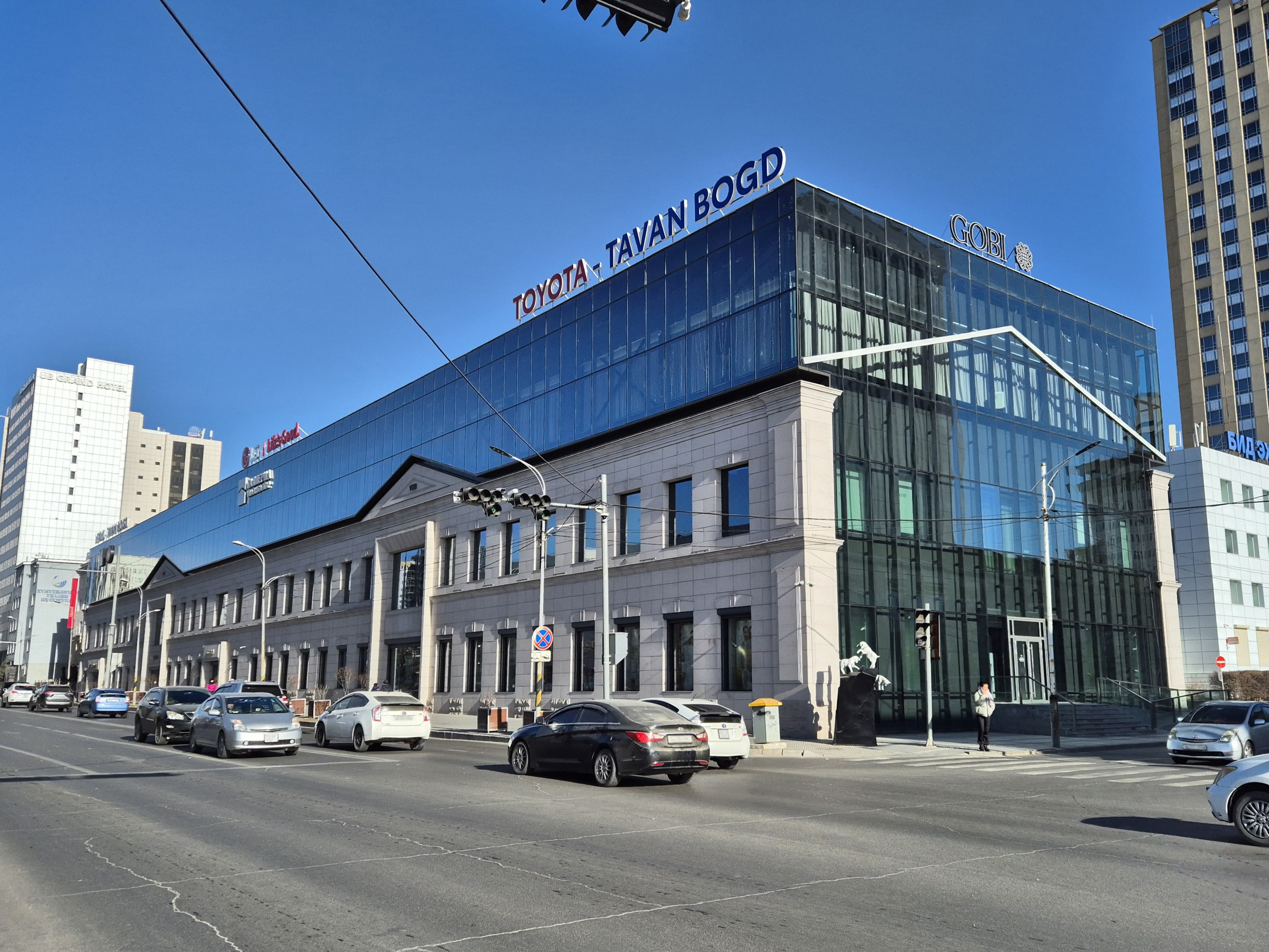
- Location: Sükhbaatar, Ulaanbaatar, Mongolia
- Coordinates: 47°55′14″N 106°55′09″E
- Opened: 2018
- Previous names: Sukhbaatar Printing Building
- Owner: Tavan Bogd Group
- Architect: Gradon Architecture
- Floors: 2

The Galleria Ulaanbaatar (Mongolian: Галлериа Улаанбаатар) is a shopping mall in Sükhbaatar District, Ulaanbaatar, Mongolia.

== History ==
The shopping mall building was originally a printing center named Sukhbaatar Printing Building which was constructed in 1929. In 2015, the building was purchased by Tavan Bogd Group through an auction with a cost of MNT24 billion. In March 2017, it was renovated to be a shopping mall. The shopping mall was then opened in 2018.

== Architecture ==
The building stands at an area of 5,244 m^{2} with a total of two floors. It was designed by Gradon Architecture.

== Finance ==
The shopping mall is owned by Tavan Bogd Group. It was renovated from the former printing center with a cost of £20 million.
