= List of hospitals in Mongolia =

Hospitals in Mongolia include:

== Arkhangai Province ==
- Arkhangai General Hospital

== Bayan-Ölgii Province ==
- General Hospital of Bayan-Ölgii Province

== Darkhan-Uul Province ==
- Darkhan General Hospital

== Khövsgöl Province ==
- Khövsgöl Province General Hospital

== Ulaanbaatar ==
- Central Military Hospital
- First Central Hospital of Mongolia
- Intermed Hospital
- Khuree Maternity Hospital
- Mongolia–Japan Hospital of MNUMS
- Second State Central Hospital
- Third State Central Hospital
