= Ulaanbaatar Department Store =

Shopping mall in Sükhbaatar, Ulaanbaatar, Mongolia

- Улаанбаатар Их Дэлгүүр
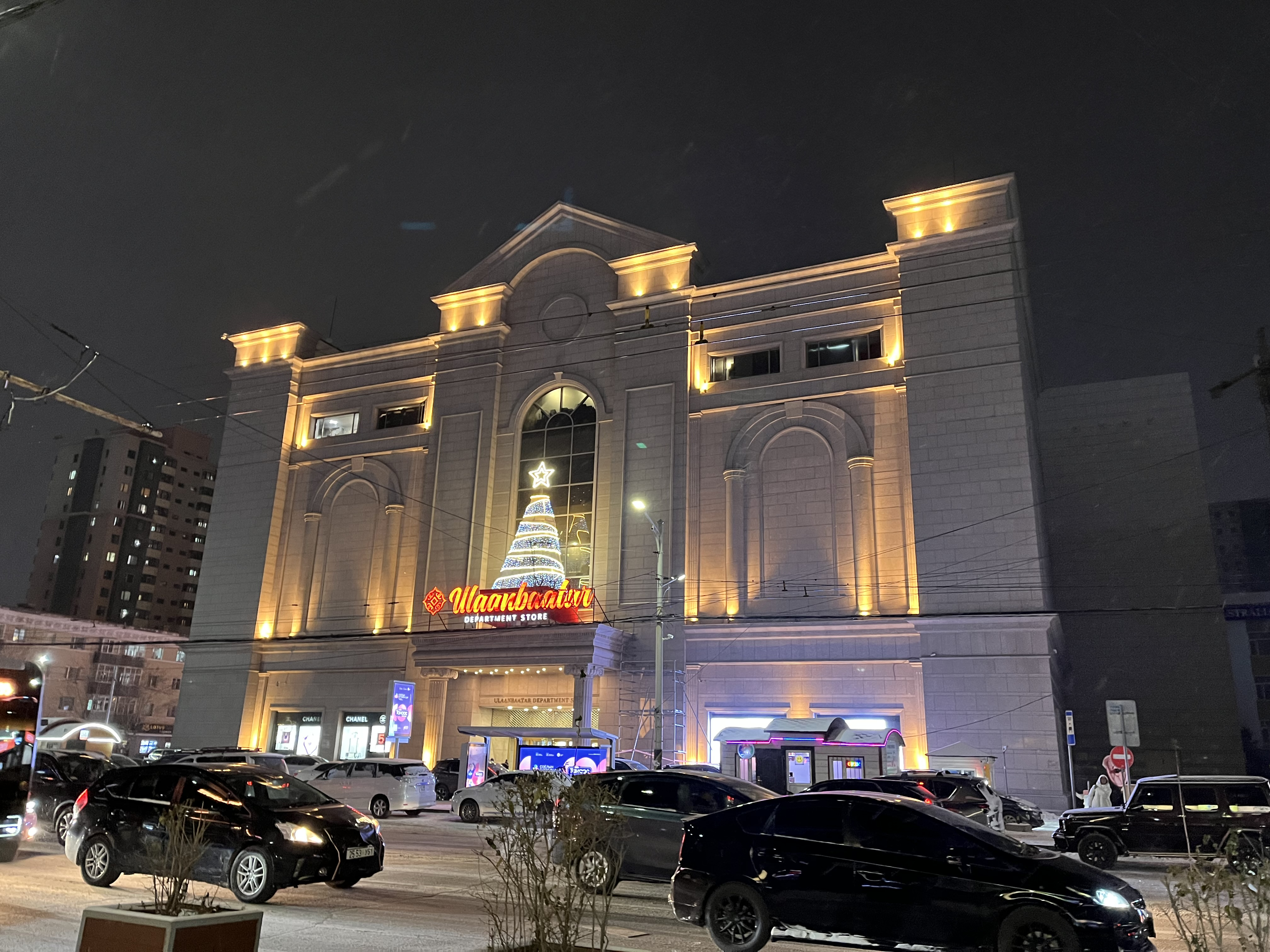
- Location: Sükhbaatar, Ulaanbaatar, Mongolia
- Coordinates: 47.9150°N 106.9016°E
- Opened: 11 January 2010
- Floors: 6
- Website: Official website (in Mongolian)

The Ulaanbaatar Department Store (Mongolian: Улаанбаатар Их Дэлгүүр) is one of the largest and most well-known shopping centers in Ulaanbaatar, Mongolia, located in Sükhbaatar District.

== History ==
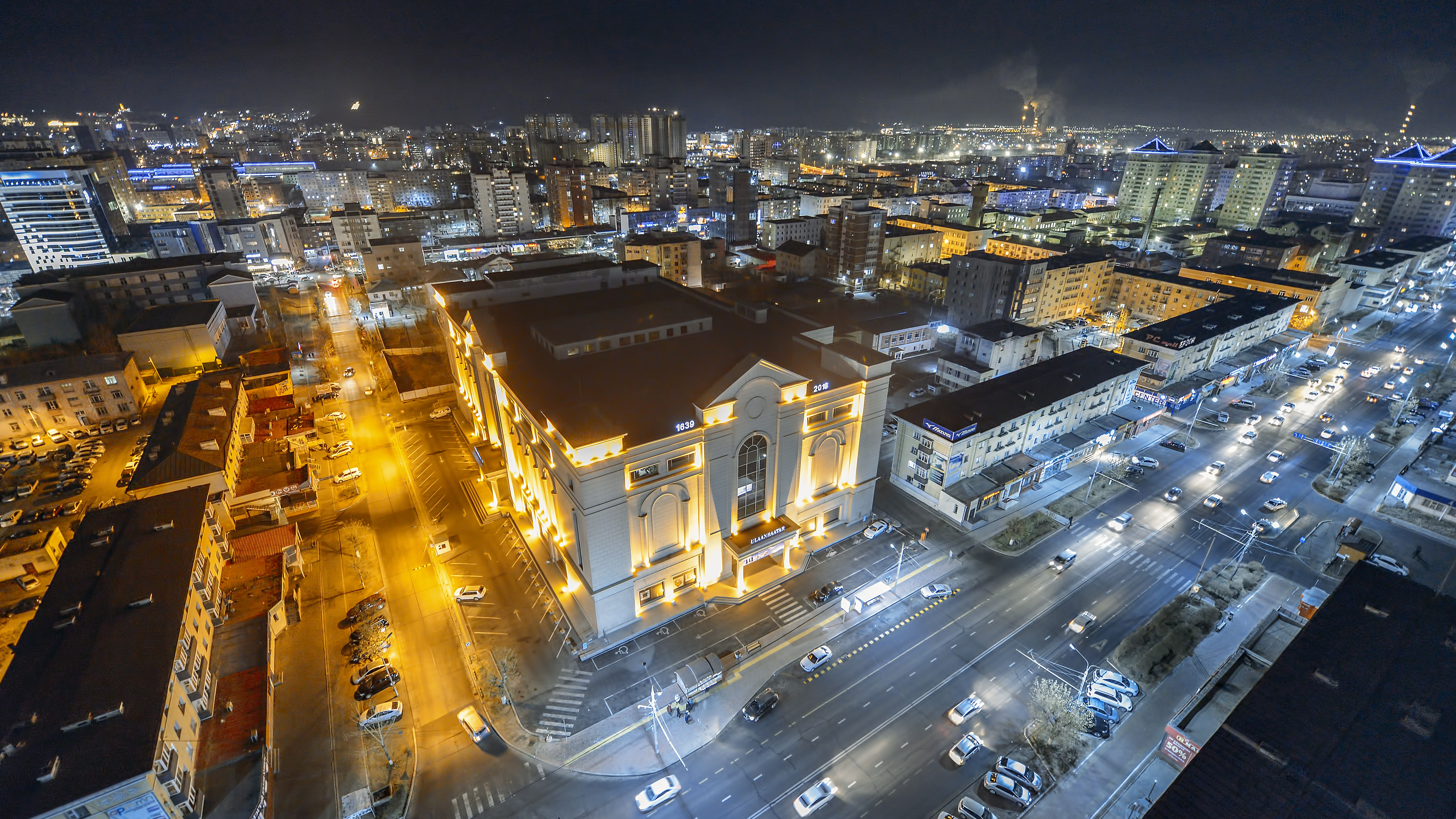
Aerial view

The department store was officially opened on January 11, 2010.

== Features ==
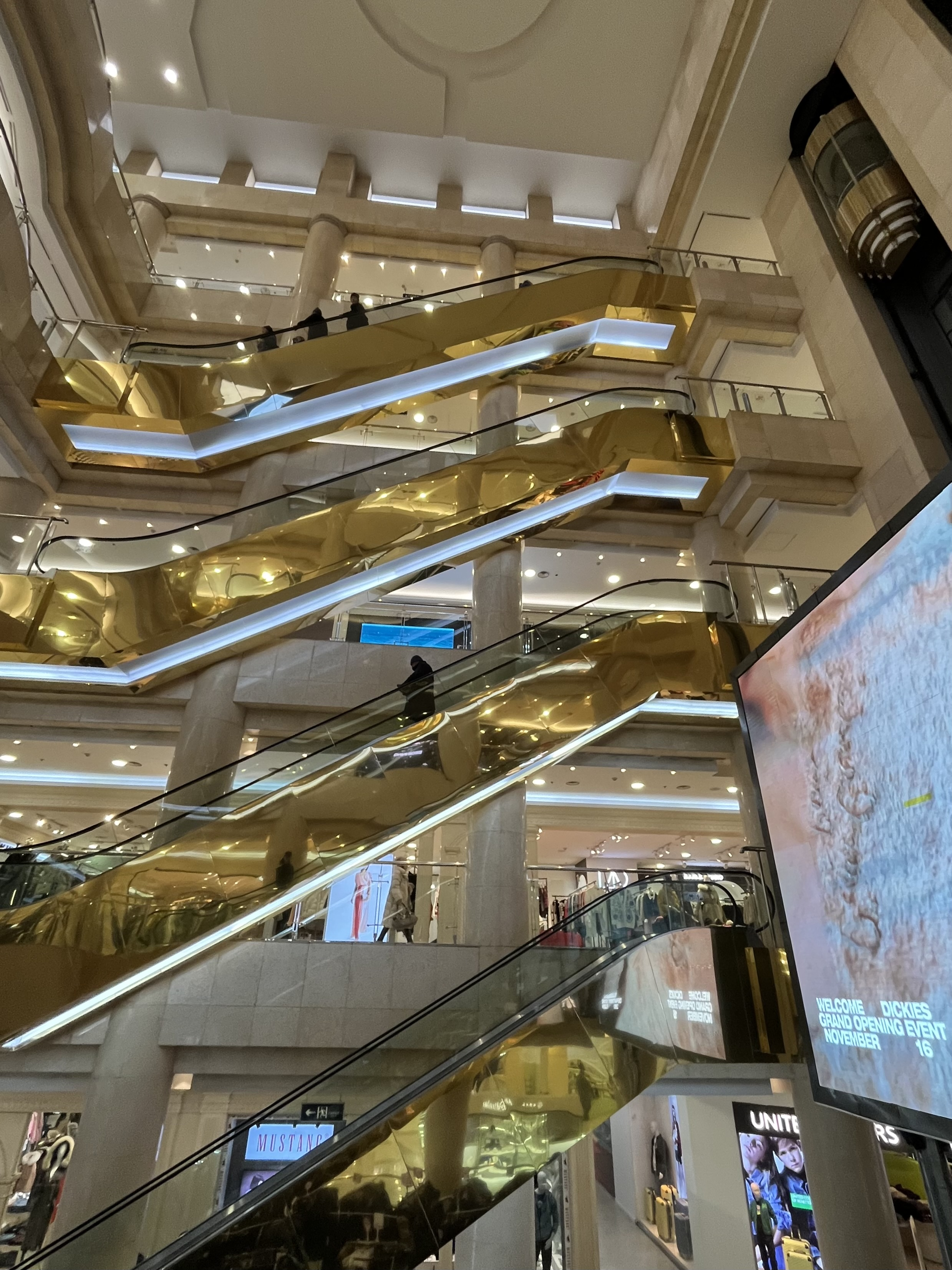
Interior view

The Ulaanbaatar Department Store spans six floors and includes a variety of retail outlets and services:

- Retail: Offers clothing, electronics, and beauty supplies.
- Supermarket
