= Second State Central Hospital =

Public hospital in Bayanzürkh, Ulaanbaatar, Mongolia

Second State Central Hospital Улсын Хоёрдугаар Төв Эмнэлэг
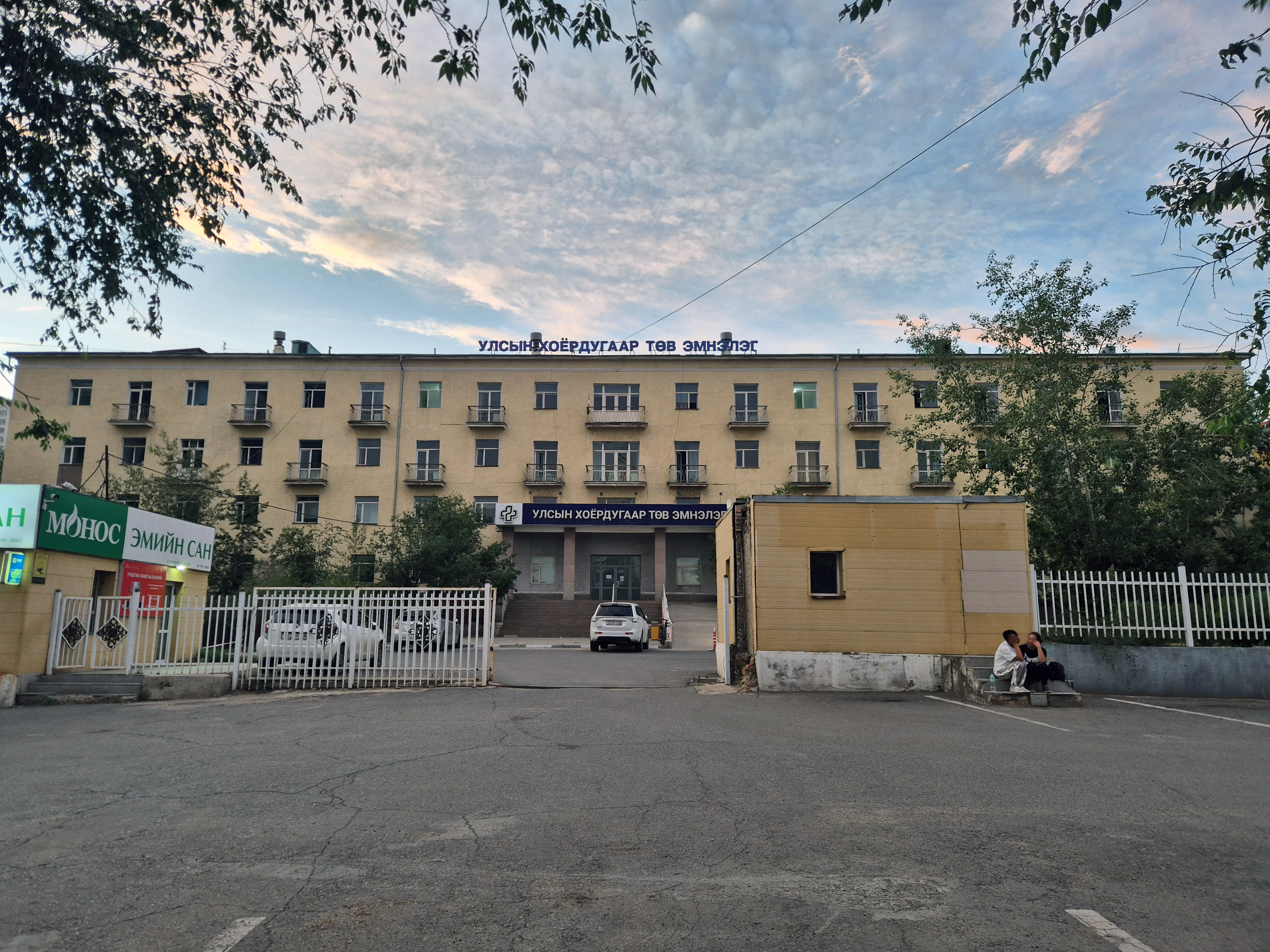

Geography
- Location: Bayanzürkh, Ulaanbaatar, Mongolia
- Coordinates: 47°55′10.9″N 106°56′15.8″E

Organisation
- Type: public hospital

History
- Founded: 1931

Links
- Website: Official website

The Second State Central Hospital (Mongolian: Улсын Хоёрдугаар Төв Эмнэлэг) is a public hospital in Bayanzürkh District, Ulaanbaatar, Mongolia.

== History ==
The hospital was originally established in 1931 with the name Activist Hospital. In 1946, the hospital was named Hospital for Officials with 25 beds. In 1991, the hospital became present hospital with 209 beds. In November 2020, the hospital opened a 50-bed children hospital section.

== See also ==
- List of hospitals in Mongolia
- Health in Mongolia
