= Third State Central Hospital =

Public hospital in Bayangol, Ulaanbaatar, Mongolia

Third State Central Hospital Улсын Гуравдугаар Төв Эмнэлэг

Geography
- Location: Bayangol, Ulaanbaatar, Mongolia
- Coordinates: 47°55′10.9″N 106°56′15.8″E

Organisation
- Type: public hospital

History
- Founded: 1954

Links
- Website: Official website (in Mongolian)

The Third State Central Hospital (Mongolian: Улсын Гуравдугаар Төв Эмнэлэг) or Shastin Central Hospital is a public hospital in Bayangol District, Ulaanbaatar, Mongolia.

== Name ==
The hospital is named after a Soviet doctor Pavel Nikolaevich Shastin.

== History ==
The hospital was opened in 1954. In 2020, the hospital received laser treatment equipment from the World Health Organization. On 7 October 2021, the hospital received another 30 types of medical equipment for diagnosis and emergency care.

== Capacity ==
The hospital has a total of 350 beds.

== See also ==
- List of hospitals in Mongolia
- Health in Mongolia
