= Education in Mongolia =

Mongolia's education system has undergone colossal changes in the 20th century. The education reforms during communist times were a stark break with traditional education that was often religious and esoteric. These reforms were modeled on the Soviet education system and greatly expanded access to education for Mongolian citizens. Among the changes was a transition from the traditional Mongolian script, from 1941 to 1946, to the Cyrillic alphabet. Literacy was greatly expanded as most of the population enjoyed free primary school. However, the move to democracy and free markets in the 1990s has had some negative impacts on education in Mongolia, though these setbacks have been ameliorated somewhat by an improving economy and policy reforms. Many adults benefit from the non-formal distance education programmes sponsored by the government in conjunction with foreign NGOs. Today education in Mongolia is overseen by the Ministry of Education, Culture, and Science.

In 2020, the Ministry of Education announced its collaboration with Cambridge Assessment International Education to reform the secondary education on par with international standards.

== Education today ==
In June 2011, VSO Mongolia published a report on the education sector which looked at progress, challenges, and future priorities given the current socio-economic changes in Mongolia. The report, which was launched to commemorate IYV+10 (10th Anniversary of the International Year of Volunteers), showed that there were numerous opportunities presented by the high level of economic growth, which has brought more resources into the sector. However, it showed that as Mongolia emerges onto the world stage, the disparity between rich and poor could leave many marginalized when it comes to benefiting from education. The report argued that the Mongolian government has made an immense effort to develop the education sector at all levels since its transition to democracy with an admirable openness and willingness to progress towards its further development. This was particularly noted in accommodating for Mongolia's unique country characteristics such as the nomadic lifestyle, low population density in remote areas, and striving toward meeting international standards.

The report also showed that Mongolian people have always valued education over other attributes and have habitually made it their priority to educate their children. Due to these efforts, the findings showed that overall the parents were satisfied with their children’s progress at school. However, there were still many challenges that remain to be tackled. The findings also showed that amongst all stakeholders, there was an overwhelming majority who gave a negative response when asked about the performance of the sector at present; this was in the quality of education (68%), access to education (83%), and the inclusiveness of the system for disadvantaged groups (76%).

In concluding what VSO Mongolia achieved in its education program over the last 20 years, the report showed that international volunteers have and continue to make a significant impact in the development of the education sector. Stakeholders who took part in this research generally held a positive view of the role and influence of the international volunteers, with 67% of respondents regarding them as having played a crucial role in education. While just over half of respondents had an experience of working with international volunteers, 94% of respondents were willing to work with them in the future. At this stage in Mongolia’s development, the relevance and impact of international volunteering were highlighted when addressing these challenges and future priorities in taking the education sector forward to achieve its ultimate goal of "Education for All."

== Pre-school education ==
Mongolia has an extensive, state-financed pre-school education system. There are over 700 state and private kindergartens (name for daycare). During socialist times, every sum had at least one nursery school and a kindergarten. Currently, there are only kindergartens that enroll children over the age of 3. In Ulaanbaatar, there are some privately run nursery schools and kindergartens; many offer language training, for example, Russian.

== Primary and secondary education ==
The system for lower-level education in Mongolia has been similar to the one used during communist times, though the government has begun reforms to expand it. The original system included four years of compulsory schooling followed by a further four years of compulsory lower-secondary education. There were then two years of upper-secondary non-compulsory education that either have a vocational, technical, or general education focus. The expansion began in 2004 with the official school entry age dropping from age 8 to 7. A further expansion was set to take place in 2008 with the entry grade level dropping one more year to age 6. The goal is to have a 12-year 6-4-2 system for primary and secondary education.

As of 2003, there were 688 primary and secondary schools with about 528,000 students and 20,725 teachers. There were 32 vocational and technical training centers with 20,000 students and over 800 teachers. General education starts at age 6. In 2015, Mongolian children enroll in school at the age of six for 12 years (5-4-3) of education.

== Schools ==
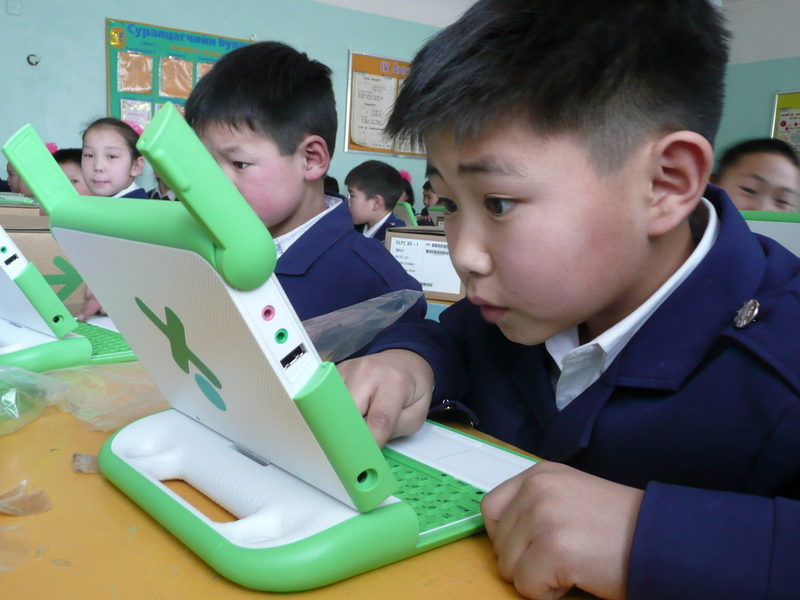
School children in Ulaanbaatar

As in many post-socialist countries, Mongolia's school system, previously based on the ten-year school, has been shifting towards twelve-year education. The official school entrance age was lowered to six starting in 2008. Compulsory education is nine years. The school year begins on 1 September.

Schools in sum centers usually have boarding schools for pupils from the countryside. Many of these sum schools only go to the ninth grade. Pupils who want to complete secondary school have to attend schools in the aimag centers.

In Ulaanbaatar and cities like Erdenet, there are private schools, though of mixed quality. Ulaanbaatar also has some foreign-language themed public schools, for example for Russian, Chinese, Turkish, English, and German.

In collaboration with Cambridge Assessment International Education, the Ministry of Education has undergone a major educational reform to match with international standards. As a result, numerous public and private schools have been established, offering Cambridge Pathway (Primary, Checkpoint, IGCSE, AS and A levels). Currently, there are three public schools with Cambridge programs, providing the opportunity for students nationwide to access international education while experimenting with and implementing the reform.

According to the ranking of Mongolia's high schools based on university entrance exam results, nine out of ten schools were private (with tuition), while three were Turkish schools. In Ulaanbaatar, there are several private secondary schools that have instruction in English and Mongolian, and just a few that have English-only instruction.

== Adult education ==
=== Higher education ===
Higher education in Mongolia came with the communist revolution in the early 20th century and was based on a Soviet model. Since its inception the higher education system has seen significant growth to this day. As of 2003 there were 178 colleges and universities, though only 48 of those were public. However, there were 98,031 students at the public universities compared to 31,197 private students, indicating the continued importance of publicly funded higher education in Mongolia. Under communist rule all higher education was provided free of charge. Since the early 1990s, fees have been introduced, though the government offers grants and scholarships. The quality of education in the privately owned institutions is usually perceived as inferior.

There are many universities in Mongolia. The most prominent one is the National University of Mongolia in Ulaanbaatar, which was founded in 1942 (as Choybalsan University) with three departments: education, medicine, and veterinary medicine. The faculty was Russian, as was the language of instruction. In 1983 the university's engineering institute and Russian-language teacher training institute became separate establishments, called the Polytechnic Institute and the Institute of Russian Language, respectively. The Polytechnic Institute, with 5,000 students, concentrated on engineering and mining. Mongolian State University, with about 4,000 students, taught pure science and mathematics, social science, economics, and philology. More than 90 percent of the faculty were Mongolian; teachers also came from the Soviet Union, Eastern Europe, France, and Britain. Much instruction was in Russian, reflecting the lack of Mongol-language texts in advanced and specialized fields.

Besides Mongolian State University there were seven other institutions of higher learning: the Institute of Medicine, the Institute of Agriculture, the Institute of Economics, the State Pedagogical Institute, the Polytechnic Institute, the Institute of Russian Language, and the Institute of Physical Culture. In the summer, all students had a work semester, in which they helped with the harvest, formed "shock work" teams for construction projects, or went to work in the Soviet Union or another Com-econ country. In early 1989, the education authorities announced that third-year and fourth-year engineering students would be told which enterprise they would be assigned to after graduation, so that their training could be focused on practical ends in mind.

==== Research and scholarship ====
Scholars suffer from Mongolia’s isolation from the world's knowledge society. Mongolian scholars tend to be dissatisfied with their access to information in general and some are still uncomfortable with online databases. In many cases, university library resources are underdeveloped and not satisfactory to scholars. Furthermore, it may not be possible for scholars to subscribe to professional journals because of cost and language barriers. The most popular ways for scholars to find information are to borrow articles from colleagues, use a library copy, or get a copy from colleagues abroad. About 83% of scholars use the Internet for research, which is about the same percentage of English speakers. The increasing importance of the Internet in research and global academic exchanges has pushed more scholars to favor English over the language that used to dominate Mongolia's academia, Russian.

== Science ==
Mongolia has a tradition of respect for knowledge and wisdom. Chinggis Khaan summoned scholars to The Council of Sages, highly respected helping run the state and domestic and foreign policies. Members were ranked according to function; for instance, some had to record the Khaan’s orders or announce them to the people. In 1264, Chinggis’s grandson Khubilai Khaan founded the Institute of Learned Scholars, from which came the concept of the Academy. Here, all the wise with their own tasks and duties were ranked and named.

=== Non-formal distance education ===
The government through its Ministry of Education, Culture, and Science, and often in conjunction with NGOs and outside government organizations, has implemented non-formal distance education programs promoting basic skill development. About 100,000 of Mongolia's 1,200,000 adults are taking part in some form of distance education. The program often uses radio communications to overcome the problem of distance. This is particularly suitable to nomads, since their mobile lifestyles are not conducive to landline communications. The focus of these distance education programs is on rural populations that need more skills than their urban counterparts. The radio classes are conducted using booklets sent to the participants and video instruction at learning centres. They are designed to help adults learn about topics that they might find useful in everyday life. Subjects such as nutrition, first aid, and hygiene are taught to help improve health. Classes ranging from wool production to cooking to saddle-making are taught as ways to help rural people improve skills and possibly generate income. Likewise, basic business classes on production, accounting, and marketing are taught to improve rural residents' financial situation. There are courses using classic fairy tales to teach literacy, and classes on math and current events. Non-formal education is one of the only ways for students who dropped out of school to attain a primary school equivalency education. From 2000 to 2004, 28,356 students earned this equivalency through the non-formal programme.

Each of Mongolia's 21 aimags has its own Education and Culture Department which administers formal and non-formal education programs within its borders. Each aimag is responsible for developing the content of their programs and implementing them. For non-formal distance education, there are two country-wide programs: "The National Program of Non-Formal Education Development" and the "National Program for Distance Education." Pedagogical training for the instructors is taken care of by the Center for Non-formal Education, which is part of Ministry of Education, Culture, and Science (Mongolia). There is a National Education Inspection Service that monitors the programs, so it is not clear how much control the national-level of the Ministry of Education is compared to the aimag-level.

The non-formal distance education program makes use of "enlightenment centers," often in schools or government offices, to distribute educational materials.

==== Specific projects ====
Gobi Nomadic Women's Project

==== Funding and support sources ====
- UNICEF program to help children who drop out from school.
- Government of Denmark (funded the Gobi Nomadic Women’s Project)

== History ==
=== Pre-modern times ===
Education in Mongolia traditionally was controlled by the Buddhist monasteries and was limited to monks. Tibetan was the language of instruction, the canonical, and liturgical language, and it was used at the lower levels of education. Higher-level education was available in the major monasteries, and often many years were required to complete formal degrees, which included training in logic and debate. With the exception of medicine, which involved extensive pharmacopeia and training in herbal medicines, higher education was esoteric and unworldly. Major monasteries supported four colleges: philosophy, doctrine, and protocol; medicine; mathematics, astrology, and divination; and demonology and demon suppression. In the early 20th century, officials and wealthy families hired tutors for their children. Government offices operated informal apprenticeships that taught the intricacies of written records, standard forms, and accounting. Official Mongolian sources, which tended to depict the prerevolutionary period as one of total backwardness, probably underestimated the level of literacy, but it was undoubtedly low.

The earliest example of public education in Mongolia is a secular school set up by the Buddhist monk and poet Dazan Ravjaa at the Khamar Monastery in the 1820s.

=== Independence (1911–1921) ===
Secular education began soon after the collapse of the Manchu Qing authority in 1911. A Mongol-language school under Russian auspices opened in Yihe Huree in 1912; much of the teaching of the 47 pupils was done by Buryat Mongols from Siberia. In the same year, a military school with Russian instructors opened. By 1914, a school teaching Russian to Mongolian children were operating in the capital. Its graduates, in a pattern that was to become familiar, went to cities in Russia for further education. Perhaps in response to the challenge of the few secular schools, monasteries in the 1920s ran schools for boys who did not have to take monastic vows. Such schools used the Mongol language and the curricula had heavily religious content.

=== Creation of a public school system ===
Education expanded slowly throughout the 1920s. As late as 1934, when 55 percent of all party members were illiterate, secular state schools enrolled only 2.7 percent of all children between the ages of eight and seventeen, while 13 percent of that age group were in monastic schools. Suppression of the monasteries in 1938 and 1939 closed the monastic schools, and the state schools expanded steadily throughout the 1940s and the 1950s. In 1941 the traditional Mongol script, based on the Uighur script, was replaced by Cyrillic. It took from 1941 to 1946—sources differ on the date—to implement the change completely. Mongolian authorities announced that universal adult literacy had been achieved by 1968. A Russian-owned printing shop, opened in Yihe Huree in the early twentieth century, turned out Mongolian translations of Russian novels and political tracts; in 1915 it printed Mongolia's first newspaper, Niysleliyn Hureeniy Sonon Bichig (News of the Capital Huree).

== Literacy ==
Mongolia has a high literacy rate, consistently rated around 98%. For comparison, the World Bank, which supports the above figure, puts Mongolia’s more prosperous neighbor China’s literacy rate at 91%. Mongolia benefited from compulsory primary education under the communist regime in the 20th century, continuing in a similar form today. The fact that 90% of the population speaks Khalka Mongolian as their primary language may help literacy in that resources can be largely focused on one language. The Mongolian government's non-formal distance education programs also provide opportunities for citizens to learn to read and write.

Mongolian literacy has its start near the beginning of the Mongolian Empire in 1204 when Genghis Khan commissioned the Uyghur scribe Tatar-Tonga to create what became the traditional Mongolian script, or "Mongol Bichig."

Historically most of the Mongolian population could not read. As late as 1934, 55% of communist party members were illiterate.

== Issues ==
Primary education has experienced some turbulence with the rise of free markets and increasing urbanization. As more families move to the cities urban schools are suffering from overcrowding while rural schools suffer from low attendance. After the communist regime stepped down and free markets were introduced, the Mongolian education system was reformed through decentralization and handing control over to local provincial governments. Before this, the government highly subsidized education, with education spending, consuming 27% of the budget in 1985 (by 1999 this number dropped below 15% of the total budget). Every child, no matter how rural, could go to well-equipped schools that had some of the lowest student-to-teacher ratios in the world.

This situation changed when the privatization of herds and the economic downturn of the 1990s put pressure on the financial stability of families and strained school budgets. This led to an increasing number of children being taken from school and put to work helping their families. The introduction of capitalism led 36.3% of the Mongolian population below the poverty line by 1995. At one point more than 15% of rural children were being put to work herding every year, and over 8% of urban children were working in cities rather than attending school. Some herders questioned the need for education if their children were only going to be tending flocks. The dropout phenomenon was exacerbated by the fact that many children needed to attend distant boarding schools. At one point these schools implemented a "Meat Requirement" to help cover the cost of feeding students. A family had to pay 70 kg of meat per child a year. The "Meat Requirement" was in essence a school fee that some families could not afford; it has since been rescinded.

Boys suffered the most from the dropout rates because they were more likely to be needed tending herds and were often seen as problem students. Fortunately, primary education in Mongolia has largely rebounded and school dropout rates are decreasing. However, the quick growth of dropouts during the economically turbulent 1990s illustrates how fragile access to education can be in Mongolia. And while legal safeguards guarantee eight years of primary education, there is no way to enforce these laws.

== Further reading and links ==
- Choijoo, Altangerel. "Mongolia Teacher Training Survey." Global Strategic Planning Meeting on Teacher Training in Human Rights Education, June 2005. Accessed from the University of Minnesota Human Rights Library, 9 July 2008.
- Mongolia Dossiers. UNESCO International Bureau of Education. Retrieved 3 July 2008.
- Developing the Mongolia Education Sector Strategy 2000-2005. John C. Weidman, 2001. Current Issues in Comparative Education. Retrieved 3 July 2008.
- Education in Mongolia. World Education News and Reviews, 2003. Retrieved 3 July 2008.
- Higher Education Systems. International Association of Universities online database. Retrieved 3 July 2008.
- Mongolia. Okhidoi Otgonjargal, 2003. The International Comparative Higher Education Finance and Accessibility Project. Retrieved 3 July 2008.
- Mongolian Higher Education in Transition. John. C. Weidman, 1999. International Higher Education. Retrieved 3 July 2008.
- The Changing Structure of Higher Education in Mongolia. World Education News and Reviews, July 2003. Retrieved 3 July 2008.
- Mongolia entry in World Data on Education website: International Bureau of Education – United Nations Educational, Scientific, and Cultural Organization (IBE-UNESCO). Retrieved 3 July 2008.
- Robinson, B. (1995). Mongolia in transition: a role for distance education. Open Learning, 10, 3-14. Retrieved 7 July 2008.
- Krätli, Saverio. Education Provision to Nomadic Pastoralists: A Literature Review. Brighton, U.K.: Institute of Development Studies, 2001. 84 p. Retrieved 5 July 2008.
- "Education for All." Asian Development Bank. Adb.org, 2008. Retrieved 21 May 2013.
- Steiner-Khamsi and Stolpe (2005). Non-Traveling "Best Practices" for a Traveling Population: The Case of Nomadic Education in Mongolia. European Educational Research Journal. Retrieved 9 July 2008.
