= Ministry of Education (Mongolia) =

Government ministry of Mongolia

Ministry of Education of Mongolia
- Монгол Улсын Боловсролын Яам
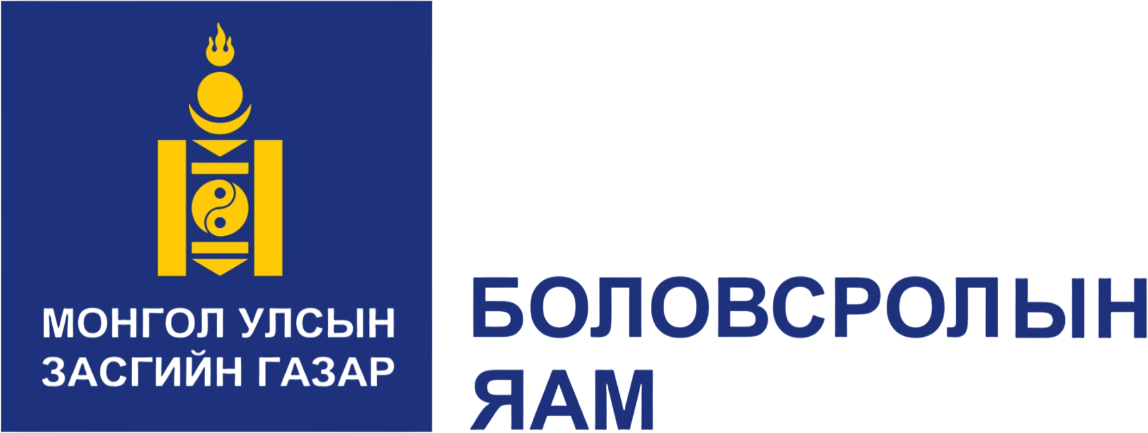

Ministry overview
- Jurisdiction: Government of Mongolia
- Headquarters: Baga Toiruu-44, Government Building III, Ulaanbaatar, Mongolia
- Employees: 86
- Minister responsible: Purevsurengiin Naranbayar
- Deputy Minister responsible: Ganbayar Ganbold
- Ministry executive: Lkhagvyn Tsedevsuren, State Secretary of Ministry of Education and Science
- Parent department: Government of Mongolia
- Child agencies: Education Quality Assessment Center; Institute for Educational Development; Education Quality Assessment Center; Educational Research Institute; Education Development Fund
- Website: Official website

The Ministry of Education (MOE; Mongolian: Боловсролын Яам) is the central state administering body which is responsible for the creation of nationwide policies relating to education, academic activities and science. The Ministry sets standards for education levels, schedules the school year, approves secondary education textbooks, administers the national entrance exam, provides support to regional education agencies, and issues licenses to establish higher education institutions. The current minister since 11 July 2024 is Purevsurengiin Naranbayar.
