= Intermed Hospital =

Hospital in Khan Uul, Ulaanbaatar, Mongolia

Coordinates: 47°53′55.4″N 106°54′19.7″E

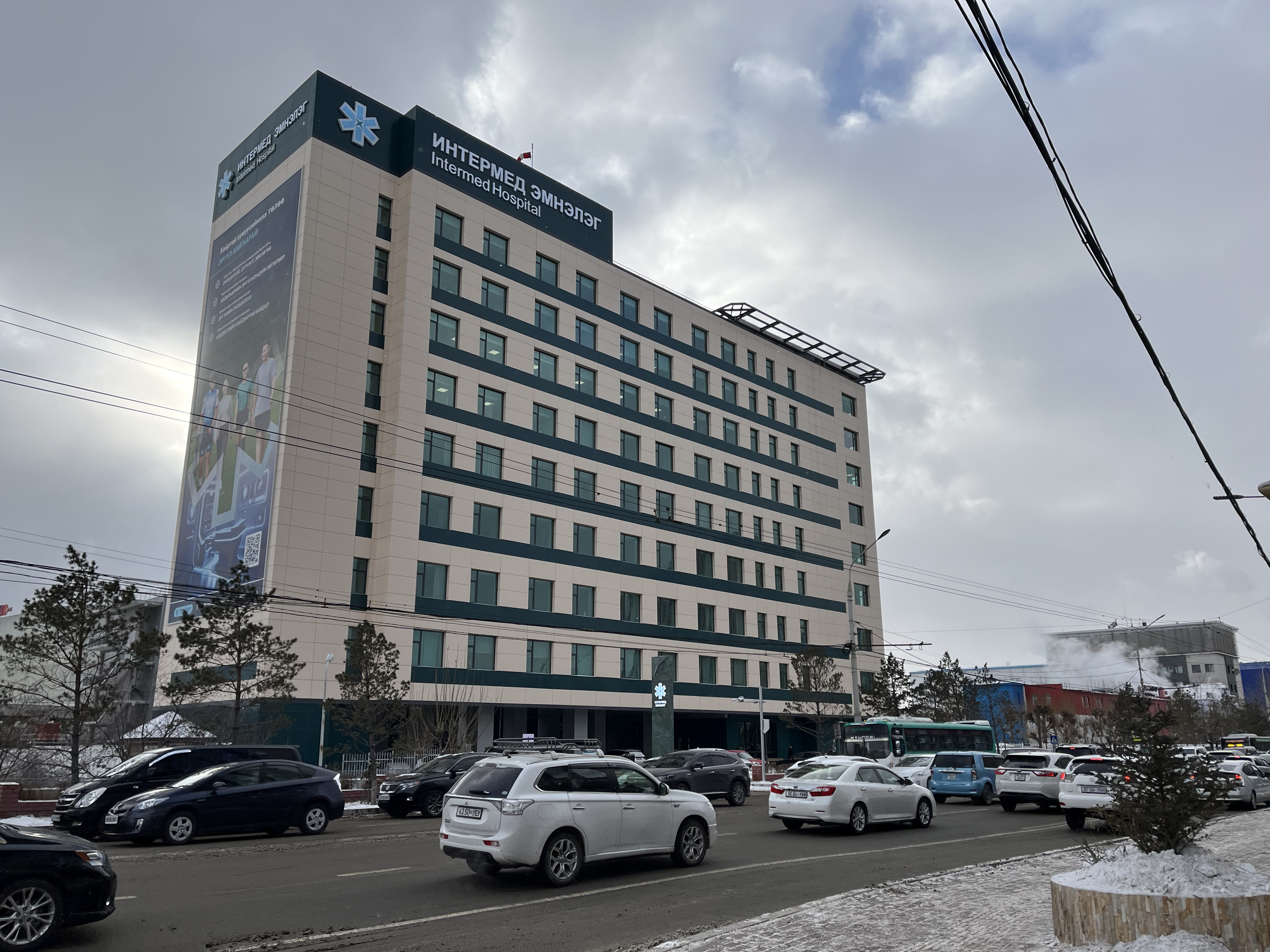

Geography
- Location: Khan Uul, Ulaanbaatar, Mongolia

Services
- Standards: Joint Commission International
- Emergency department: Yes
- Beds: 91

History
- Founded: May 7, 2014

Links
- Website: www.intermed.mn
- Lists: Hospitals in Mongolia

Intermed Hospital (Mongolian: Интермед Эмнэлэг) is a private hospital in Khan Uul District, Ulaanbaatar, Mongolia. It is owned by MCS Group, Energy Resources and Shunkhlai Group. The hospital has the capacity to receive around 90 inpatients at a time, and has 16 outpatient clinics (except spinal). Annually, the hospital can receive up to 5,000 inpatients and 100,000 outpatients visits.

== History ==
In 2005, the hospital project was first initiated and planning started. In June 2010, a joint company has been established by the name "International Medical Center LLC". Then the commissioning stage of the project continued. By acquiring hospital license, it officially opened on 7 May 2014, and Intermed Center LLC was established.

In September 2014, the hospital's name was changed, as well as the logo, to United Family Intermed Hospital (UFIH), as the management contract was made with United Family Healthcare Group.

In August 2016, UFIH was accredited by JCI and received its Gold Seal of Approval. An on-site survey was held between 15 and 19 August 2016. Out of 1100 indicators 39 were insufficient, and with 96% of performance UFIH was accredited. Then, starting from 1 January 2017, the hospital changed its name to Intermed Hospital. Intermed Hospital is the first and only JCI Accredited hospital in Mongolia.

== Location and facilities ==
The hospital is located in Ulaanbaatar city, Mongolia. To be more specific, it is located on the Northwest of Green Palace and the East of APU Company, in Khan-Uul district. Bogd Khan's personal doctor's building was used to be on the current location of the hospital.

The hospital is on 12,624.1 square metres (135,885 sq ft) of land. For laboratory purposes, Intermed Hospital uses technologies including Sysmex, Roche, BioMérieux, Leica and Siemens.

== Specialties ==
Intermed hospital has the following specialties: Surgery, Obstetrics and Gynecology(OB&GY), Pediatric care, Cardiovascular care, Kidney care, Endocrinology, Pulmonary, Gastroenterology, Endoscopy, Intensive Care Unit (ICU) & Anesthesiology, Dental clinic, ENT(Ear, nose and throat care), Eye care (ophthalmology), Neurology, Rehabilitation center, Health Promotion Center, Emergency, Daycare, Laboratory and Radiology.

Intermed hospital is one of the two hospitals in Mongolia that deliver aircraft Medical evacuation (medevac) service to the people with urgent need. There is also SOS Medica that deliver aircraft medevac service. Intermed hospital does not own any aircraft but they work with airline companies and health insurance companies.

== Partnerships ==
Intermed Hospital works with both domestic and foreign organizations. It has a partnership with Korea University Medical Center and its affiliated hospitals. They train their doctors and nurses regularly through conference, meeting, and courses by using their connection with foreign organizations.
