= Fountain Square (Ulaanbaatar) =

Town square in Sükhbaatar, Ulaanbaatar, Mongolia

- town square
- Усан Оргилуурт Талбай
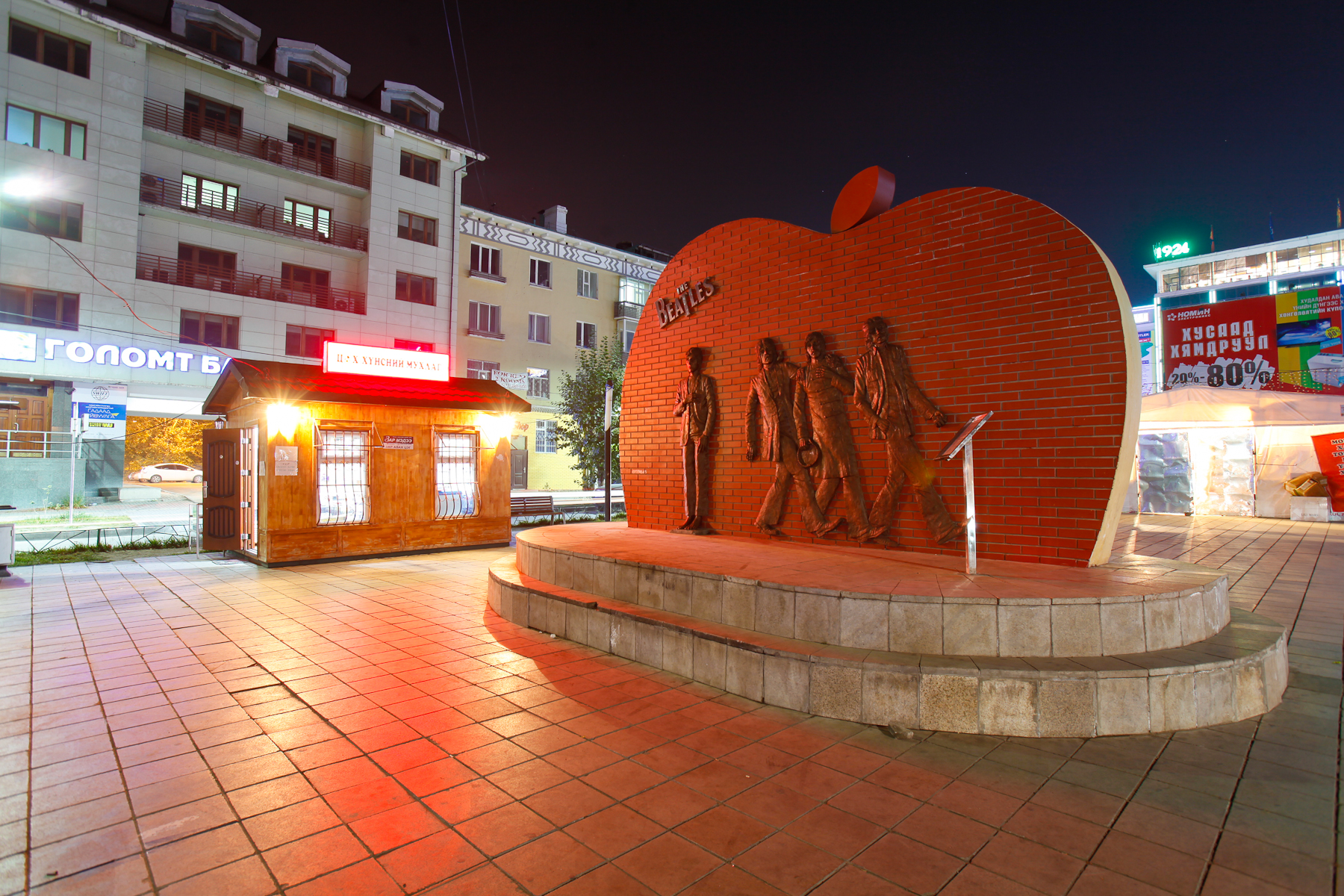
- Opened: 1947
- Location: Sükhbaatar, Ulaanbaatar, Mongolia
- Location within Mongolia
- Coordinates: 47°54′55.6″N 106°54′23.4″E

The Fountain Square (Mongolian: Усан Оргилуурт Талбай) or Beatles Square is a town square in Sükhbaatar, Ulaanbaatar, Mongolia.

== History ==
The square was originally constructed in 1947. A monument of the Beatles was erected in 2008 on the square. In August 2017, local residents protested the demolition plan of the area, despite the local government said that the construction works were done to redevelop the area.

== See also ==
- Tourism in Mongolia
