= Sükhbaatar (district) =

District in Ulaanbaatar, Mongolia

Coordinates: 48°4′44.4″N 106°57′24.7″E

Sükhbaatar District Сүхбаатар дүүрэг (Mongolian) ᠰᠦᠬᠡᠪᠠᠭᠠᠲᠤᠷᠲᠡᠭᠦᠷᠭᠡ
- Municipal District
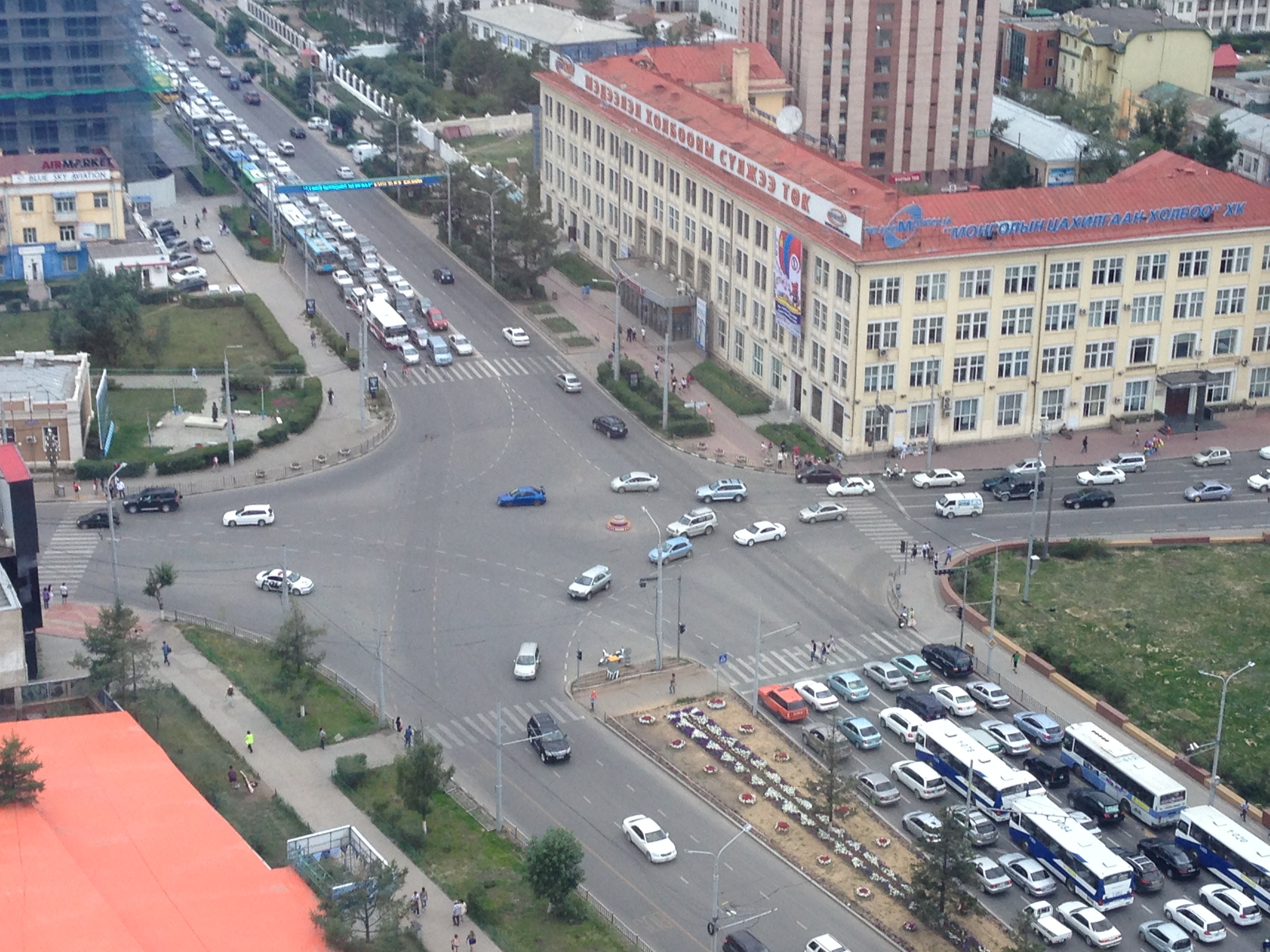
- The intersection of Chinggis Khan Avenue and Peace Avenue, a major intersection, in Sukhbaatar District.

- Flag Coat of arms
- Interactive map of Sükhbaatar District
- Country: Mongolia
- Municipality: Ulaanbaatar
- Sükhbaatar raion of Ulaanbaatar: 1965
- Reorganized as district: 1992

Government
  - Body: Citizens' Representatives Khural of the Sükhbaatar district
  - Governor of District: K. Bolormaa, DP

Area
  - Total: 208.4 km^{2} (80.5 sq mi)

Population (1 January 2024)
  - Total: 141,537
  - Density: 679.2/km^{2} (1,759/sq mi)
- Time zone: UTC+8 (UTC + 8)
- Website: Official website

Sükhbaatar District (Mongolian: Sükhbaatar düüreg) is one of nine districts of the Mongolian capital Ulaanbaatar. It is subdivided into 18 subdistricts. The district was established in 1965 and named after revolutionary hero Damdin Sükhbaatar. As of 2004, it had an approximate population of 112,533 in 24,568 households.

This district marks the center of the city. Most government, educational and cultural organizations are located here: The Mongolian Government house, The Parliament house, 13 Embassies, Government Ministries, the World Bank, the United Nations Development Programme (UNDP), the National University of Mongolia, and the University of Science and Technology.

The head office of the airline Hunnu Air (formerly Mongolian Airlines) is in the district.

== Education ==
- Banking and Finance Academy
- Children's Palace
- Mongolian University of Science and Technology
- School No.1 of Ulaanbaatar

== Infrastructure ==
- First Central Hospital of Mongolia
- Khuree Maternity Hospital

== Tourist attractions ==
- ASA Arena
- Fountain Square
- Galleria Ulaanbaatar
- Korea-Mongolia Friendship Forest
- Mongolian Railway History Museum
- Mongolian State Academic Drama Theatre
- Mongolian Theatre Museum
- National Art Gallery of Mongolia
- Sükhbaatar Square
- Ulaanbaatar Department Store
