= Mongolian Red Cross Society =

Mongolian humanitarian organization

Mongolian Red Cross Society Монголын улаан загалмай нийгэмлэг
- Formation: 1939
- Type: Aid agency
- Purpose: Humanitarian aid
- Headquarters: Ulaanbaatar
- Region served: Mongolia
- Members: International Federation of Red Cross and Red Crescent Societies
- Website: redcross.mn

The Mongolian Red Cross Society (MRCS; Mongolian: Монголын улаан загалмай нийгэмлэг, romanized: Mongolyn ulaan zagalmai niigemleg) is the largest humanitarian organization in Mongolia. It was established in 1939 as part of the International Red Cross and Red Crescent Movement and is an auxiliary to the Mongolian Government.

MRCS serves vulnerable Mongolians through a volunteer-based network which promotes humanitarianism values and the principles of the Red Cross Red Crescent movement. With 33 midlevel branches and over 800 primary level branches across Mongolia, MRCS is able to service communities nationwide.

== Programs ==
The Mongolian Red Cross Society has seven core program areas.

=== Disaster Management ===
The MRCS Disaster Management program helps communities to build resilience to natural and man-made disasters such as dzud, earthquakes and floods. They do this by assisting communities to prepare for disasters through training and awareness campaigns and providing timely disaster relief and rehabilitation activities.

=== Health and First Aid program ===
The MRCS Health and First Aid program aims to strengthen community health by providing first aid education and practical skills. MRCS conducts first aid training for volunteers as well as commercial first aid to raise funds for the national society.

=== Social Care program ===
The MRCS Social Care program provides services to support the well-being and livelihood of vulnerable groups in Mongolian society such as elderly, migrants and disabled people. Volunteers are mobilised to provide psychosocial support and help vulnerable people with everyday tasks such as preparing wood for heating and collecting drinking water, as well as accessing government care services. MRCS has a large volunteer base, with over 15,000 people offering their services each year.

=== Youth program ===
The MRCS Youth program educates Mongolian youth on humanitarian values and principles to further develop voluntary service and youth participation at all levels of society. Red Cross youth clubs are established in many Mongolian kindergartens, schools and universities to engage youth in humanitarian activities and further promote these principles to the community. Activities include peer training in health and first aid, earthquake preparedness, water and sanitation, HIV/AIDS awareness, youth camps and intercultural exchange. There are 75,000 MRCS youth members.

=== Water and Sanitation program ===
The MRCS Water and Sanitation program aims to help decrease infectious diseases transmitted through dirty hands by supplying the community with access to safe and clean drinking water, improving toilet and sanitation conditions as well as providing hygiene education.

=== Blood Donor program ===
The MRCS Blood Donor program works with related government and non government organisations to recruit and increase the number of voluntary, non-remunerated blood donors.

=== HIV/AIDS program ===
The MRCS HIV/AIDS program aims to decrease the prevalence of HIV/STIs in Mongolia and alleviate discrimination against infected people.
