= Health in Mongolia =

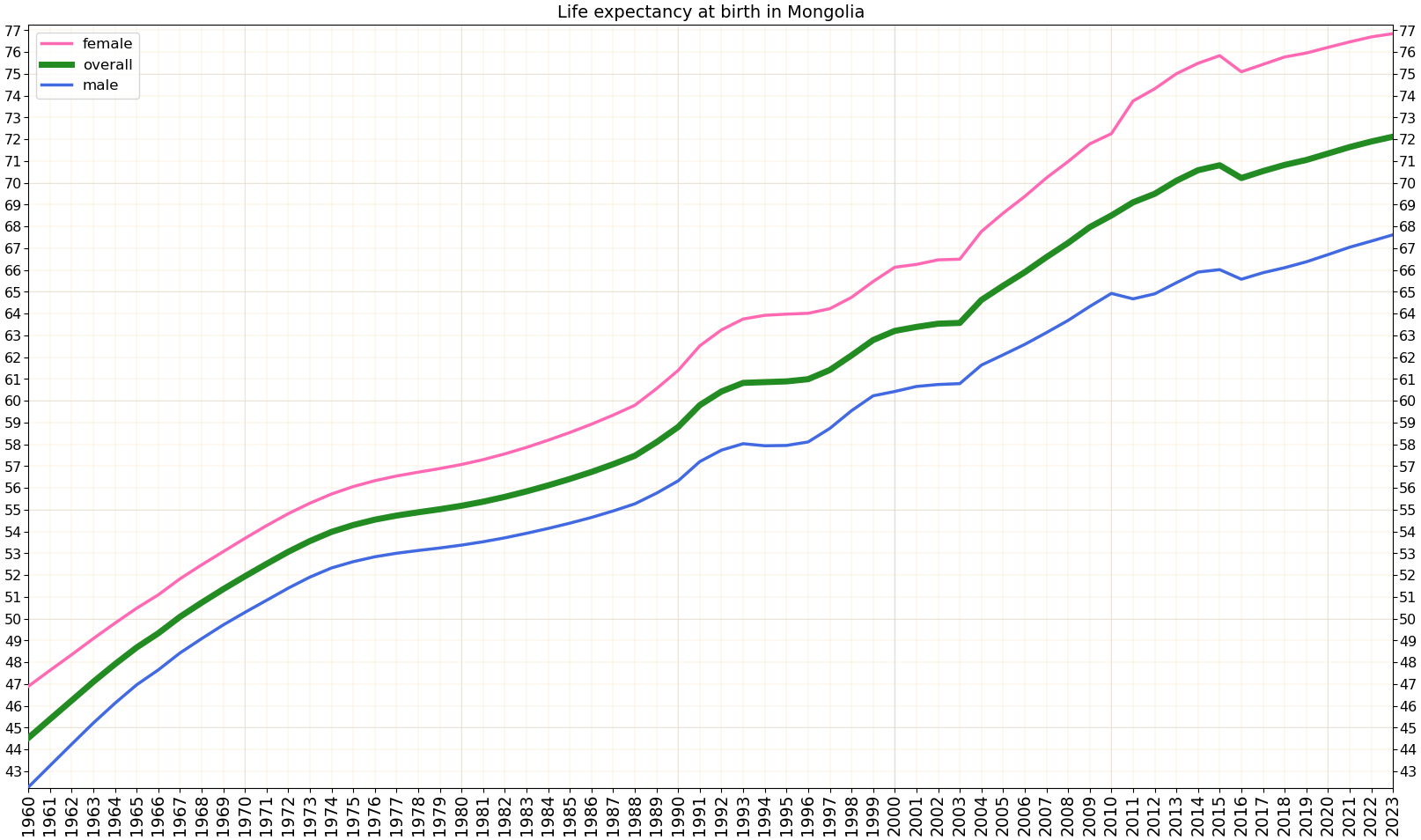
Life expectancy in Mongolia

Modern Mongolia inherited a relatively good healthcare system from its socialist period. A World Bank report from 2007 notes "despite its low per capita income, Mongolia has relatively strong health indicators; a reflection of the important health gains achieved during the socialist period." On average Mongolia's infant mortality rate is less than half of that of similarly economically developed countries, its under-five mortality rate and life expectancy are all better on average than other nations with similar GDP per capita. Since 2024 Mongolia has declared 7 April as Official Health Day, which is not a public holiday, but still is an Observance Day.

Since 1990, key health indicators in Mongolia like life expectancy and infant and child mortality have steadily improved, both due to social changes and to improvement in the health sector. Echinococcosis was one of the commonest surgical diagnoses in the 1960s, but now has been greatly reduced. Yet, adult health deteriorated during the 1990s and the first decade of the 21st century and mortality rates increased significantly. By 1981, Mongolia claimed to have eliminated smallpox, typhus, plague, poliomyelitis, and diphtheria. The Mongolian Red Cross Society focuses on preventive work. The Confederation of Mongolian Trade Unions established a network of sanatoriums.

Serious problems remain, especially in the countryside. According to a 2011 study by the World Health Organization (WHO), Mongolia's capital city, Ulaanbaatar, has the second highest level of fine particle pollution of any city in the world. Poor air quality is also the largest occupational hazard, as over two-thirds of occupational disease in Mongolia is dust induced chronic bronchitis or pneumoconiosis.

Average childbirth (fertility rate) is around 2.25–1.87 per woman (2007) and average life expectancy is 68.5 years (2011). Infant mortality is at 1.9% to 4% and child mortality is at 4.3%.

Mongolia has the highest rate of liver cancer in the world. Liver cancer remains the leading cause of death in Mongolia, and the alcohol-attributable DALY (disability-adjusted life-years) are 29 times higher than the global average respectively. Liver cancer deaths in 2019 accounted for 9.51% of total deaths in Mongolia. Almost ten times higher than the global average (0.86%.) Over the last 30 years there has been a steady incline of liver cancer attributable deaths.

The Human Rights Measurement Initiative finds that Mongolia is fulfilling 78.7% of what it should be fulfilling for the right to health based on its level of income. Regarding children's rights to health, Mongolia achieves 96.2% of what is expected based on its current income. Amongst the adult population, the country achieves only 79.2% of what is expected based on the nation's level of income. Mongolia falls into the "very bad" category when evaluating the right to reproductive health because the nation is fulfilling only 60.8% of what the nation is expected to achieve based on the resources (income) it has available.

The HRMI has yet to evaluate education and civil rights within Mongolia. Mongolia has been a subject of global scrutiny from various human rights advocacy groups, particularly uneven policing, and a lack of general population civic understanding regarding the legal system.

== Population ==
As of 2024, Mongolia had a population of 3,544,835. Ulaanbaatar, the capital and largest city, accounted for approximately 1,751,500 inhabitants, representing nearly half of the country’s total population. Roughly half the population of Mongolia has become more urbanized, while the remainder continues nomadic and semi-nomadic lifestyles. Mongolia's population growth rate is estimated at 1.6%.

Mongolia's projected to reach a population size of 4.3 million by 2060.

== Health indicators ==
Health indicators in Mongolia have improved substantially since 1990. Life expectancy has increased by more than a decade, fertility rates have declined, and maternal and child mortality have fallen sharply.

Year	Life Expectancy(years)	Fertility rate(births)	Child Mortality(%)	Maternal Mortality (per 100,000 live births)
1990	58.8	4.21	11%	276
2000	63.5	2.25	6.3%	144
2010	67.1	2.52	2.6%	71
2023	71.7	2.69	1.4%	41

Data source: Our World in Data.

== Disease prevalence ==
Since the 1990s, Mongolia has experienced an epidemiological transition, including a decrease in mortality from infectious and parasitic diseases and an increase in diseases such as cardiovascular disease, of which hypertension and ischemic heart disease are the most commonly.

Mongolia lacks an equivalent to the Centers for Disease Control and Prevention and government capabilities are limited.

=== Non-communicable ===
In 2005, Mongolia implemented a national program on the prevention and control of non-communicable diseases. Implementation was divided into two stages, 2006-2009 and 2010-2013. Indicators in the program included blood glucose levels and blood pressure.

=== Communicable ===
Mongolia has been and continues to be affected by emerging infectious diseases, including echinococcosis, rabies, tularemia, anthrax, foot-and-mouth disease, and plague. Since 1980, the WHO has received case reports of human plague cases in Mongolia; each year, approximately 40 people are diagnosed with plague caused by Yersinia pestis, primarily in rural areas.

==== Measles outbreak of 2025 ====
In April 2025, Mongolia experienced a significant measles outbreak, with 758 laboratory-confirmed cases reported as of 24 April by the National Center for Communicable Diseases. Of those affected, 171 individuals required hospitalization, 24 were receiving home treatment, and 563 had recovered. An additional 38 suspected cases remained under observation, and health authorities identified 11,539 close contacts. The outbreak has been notably concentrated in secondary schools, prompting public health officials to recommend vaccination for students, teachers, and staff to curb the spread.

== Potential future impact of climate change on health ==
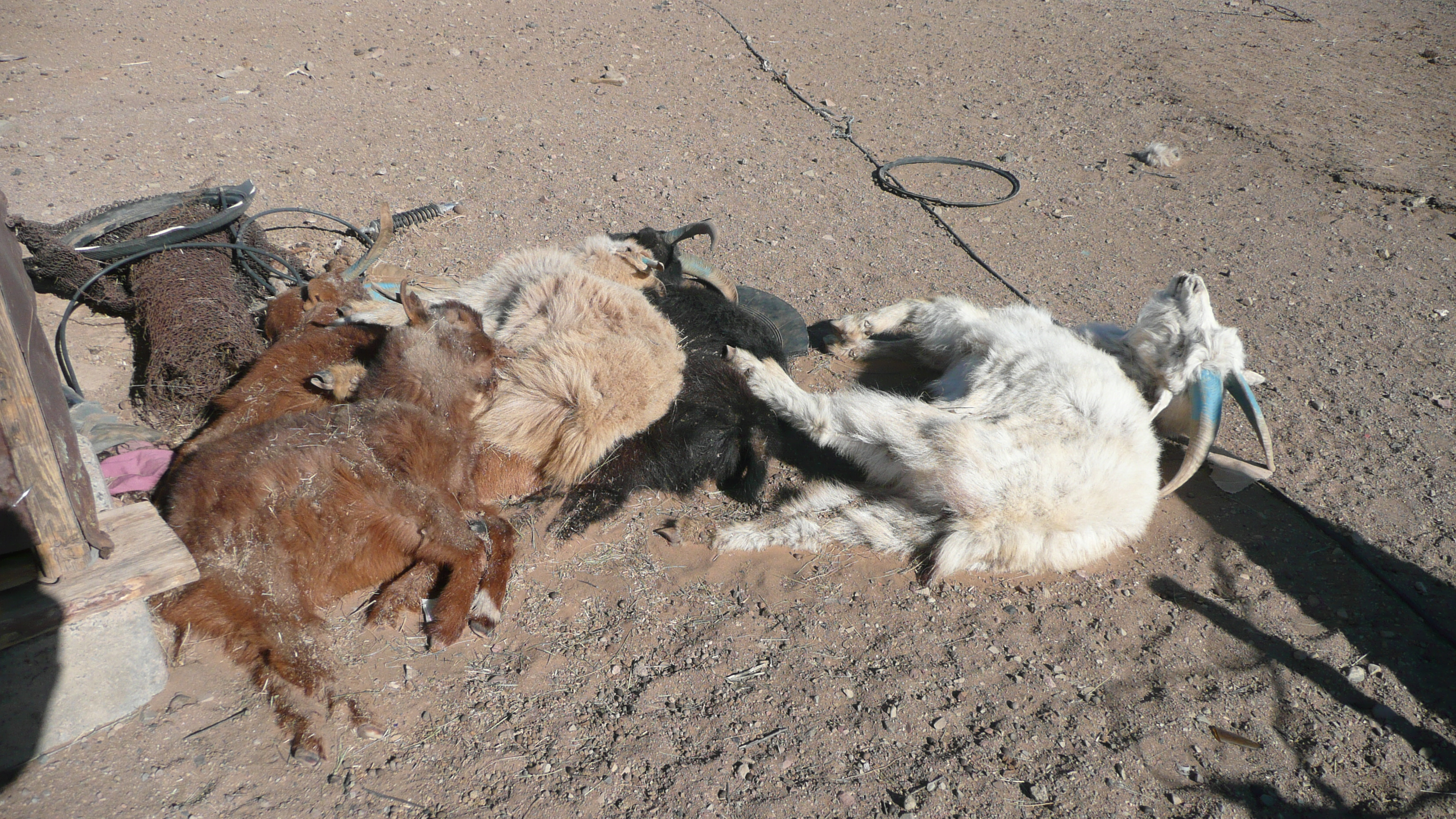
Livestock losses during a dzud in Mongolia

Mongolia, a vast, landlocked country in East Asia, is experiencing climate change impacts at a faster rate than the global average. One of the most severe consequences is the increasing frequency and intensity of dzuds, extreme winter events involving heavy snow, freezing rain, or prolonged cold. The 2023–2024 dzud affected about 90% of the national territory and killed more than 5.9 million livestock, representing over 9% of the national herd.

Climate-related environmental changes have direct and indirect consequences for health and livelihoods:

- Nutrition and poverty: Loss of livestock undermines food security and household income, increasing the risk of poverty and malnutrition. A study projected that climate change may raise food prices in Mongolia by up to 38% by 2050.
- Respiratory and Cardiovascular Disease: Migration to urban areas has expanded ger districts in Ulaanbaatar, where households rely heavily on coal and wood for heating. This contributes to hazardous indoor and outdoor air pollution.
  - Each year in Mongolia, an estimated 3,010 people die from diseases attributable to indoor air pollution and a further 1,123 people die from diseases attributable to outdoor air pollution. These include:
    - ischaemic heart disease
    - stroke
    - lung cancer
    - pneumonia
    - chronic obstructive pulmonary disease
- Mental health: Extreme weather events such as dzuds place considerable strain on herding households. The risk of livestock loss and economic insecurity, combined with occasional separation of children from caregivers during herd protection efforts, are factors contributing to mental health concerns in rural communities.
- Zoonotic and infectious disease: Mass livestock mortality leaves carcasses that may contaminate water sources during spring thaws, increasing risks of waterborne disease outbreaks in rural communities with limited healthcare access.

Adaptation measures have been initiated by government and partners. In 2025, UNICEF Mongolia and the Bayangol District Governor’s Office launched a joint project to install insulation and ventilation systems in ger-area homes. The initiative aims to reduce heat loss, lower heating costs, and significantly cut indoor air pollution.

== Healthcare ==
=== History ===
Before the 1920s Mongolia had no medical services aside from what was provided by the Lamas. Healthcare in Mongolia was developed from 1922 under the Soviet Semashko model with a large hospital and clinical network. This needed a large supply of clinically trained staff, which was not forthcoming. The isolation of the country meant that developments in medicine were slow to reach it. The ratio of doctors to the general population increased dramatically, so that in 1990, there were more than 6,000 physicians, three-quarters of whom were women.The medical care system was accessible at little or no cost even in the most remote areas. State-sponsored maternity rest homes for pastoral women in the last stages of pregnancy helped to lower infant mortality from 109 per 1,000 live births in 1960 to 57.4 in 1990, and maternal mortality by about 25 percent from 1960 to 1990. As recently as 2000 there were only 106 anaesthetists in the country.

=== Legal framework ===
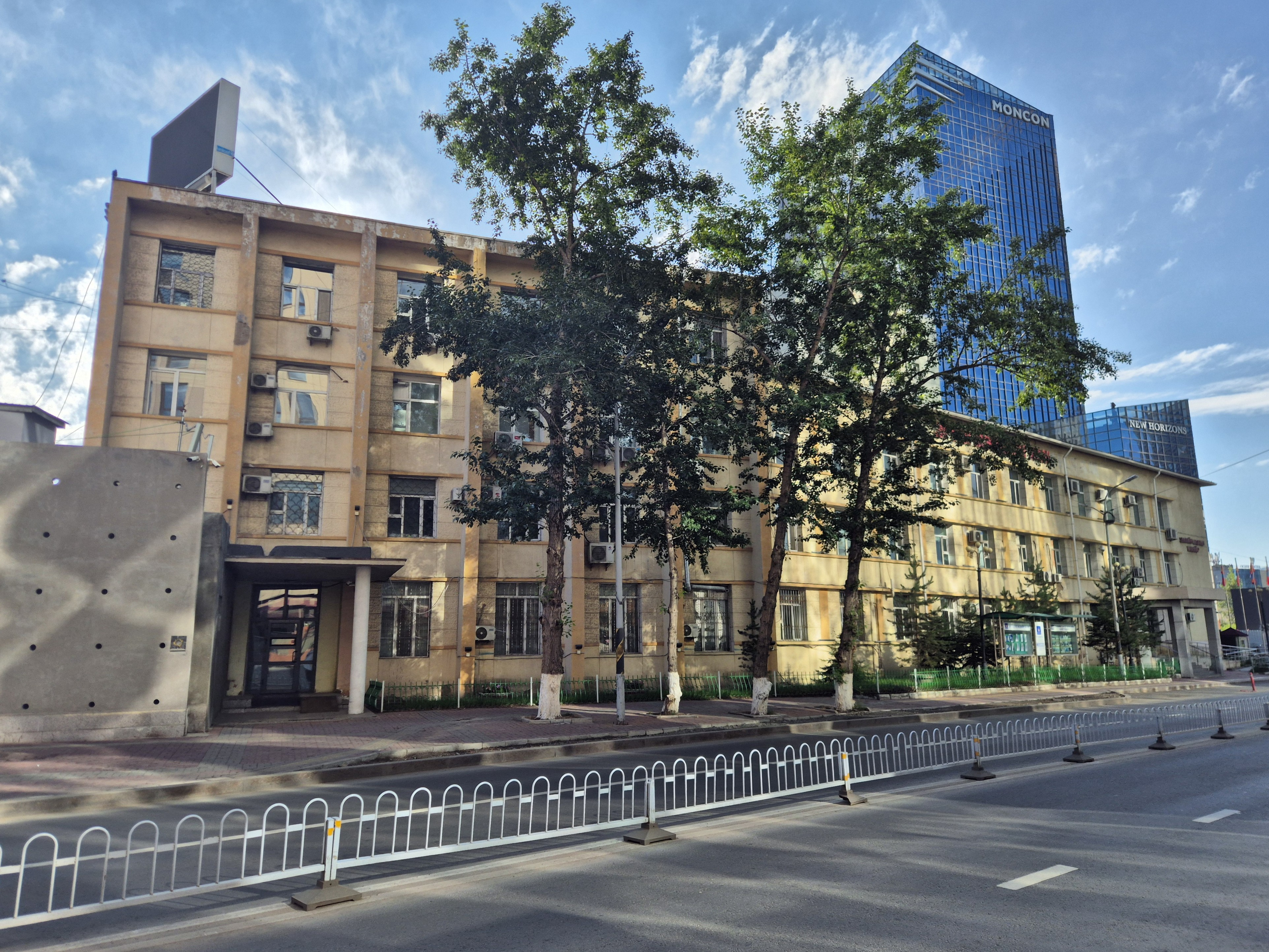
Ministry of Health of Mongolia

The Ministry of Health is responsible for the provision of Public healthcare under the Citizen's Health Insurance Law. Citizens are legally required to register and have annual check-ups. Finance is through the Health Insurance Fund established in 1994. Patients are required to make copayments of 10% for secondary care and 15% for tertiary care. in 2009 out-of-pocket payments made up 49% of total health expenditure.

=== Traditional medicine ===
Until the end of the 19th century, medical services were provided by Buddhist monks who practised traditional medicine and knew Chinese, Tibetan, and Indian remedies.

Mongolian traditional medicine was repressed after 1922 but is now recognized. The Institute of Traditional Medicine was established in 1961, and the Institute of Natural Compounds in 1973. The National Specialized Hospital caters for traditional medicine patients and has 100 beds. It sees 40-50 outpatients daily. In 2006 about 5% of all hospital in-patients were treated by traditional medicine. In 2012 there were 82 private traditional medicine clinics, 63 of them in Ulaanbaatar. Since 1990 the Mongolian National University of Medical Sciences has had a Traditional Medicine Faculty. In 2007 there were 1,538 doctors trained in traditional medicine.

=== Antibiotics ===
Mongolia had the highest consumption of antibiotics of any country in the world in 2015 with a rate of 64.4 defined daily doses per 1,000 inhabitants per day.

=== Facilities ===
A hierarchy of clinics and hospitals was established in the 1980s. A sum (district) medical station, with a doctor, then an inter-district hospital, covering a wider area and above that an aimag (provincial) general hospital covering an area of about a 200-kilometre radius. A provincial hospital would have more than 100 beds. An inter-district hospital has 10 to 20 beds and 1 or 2 general practitioners. There were 4,600 physicians in the country in 1985, 24.8 per 10,000 people. About half of them were in Ulaanbaatar where there was an oncology centre and a 600-bed isolation hospital for infectious diseases. There were about 8,500 nurses and 3,800 physician's assistants. In 1986 there were 112 hospitals. The Health Insurance Fund will not pay for people who go directly to hospitals without a referral.

The health sector comprises 17 specialized hospitals and centers, 4 regional diagnostic and treatment centers, 9 district and 21 provincial general hospitals, 323 soum hospitals, 18 feldsher posts, 233 family group practices, 536 private hospitals, and 57 drug supply companies/pharmacies. In 2002, the total number of health workers was 33,273, of whom 6823 were doctors, 788 pharmacists, 7802 nurses, and 14,091 mid-level personnel. At present, there are 27.7 physicians and 75.7 hospital beds per 10,000 inhabitants.

==== Military medicine ====
The Mongolian armed forces run a Hospital Unit in Darfur with 68 personnel, 34 men and 34 women, which provides health care, emergency resuscitation and stabilization, surgical interventions, and basic dental care for UN personnel. It administers vaccinations and other preventive measures. It has also treated more than 10,000 people from the local communities.

=== Hospitals ===
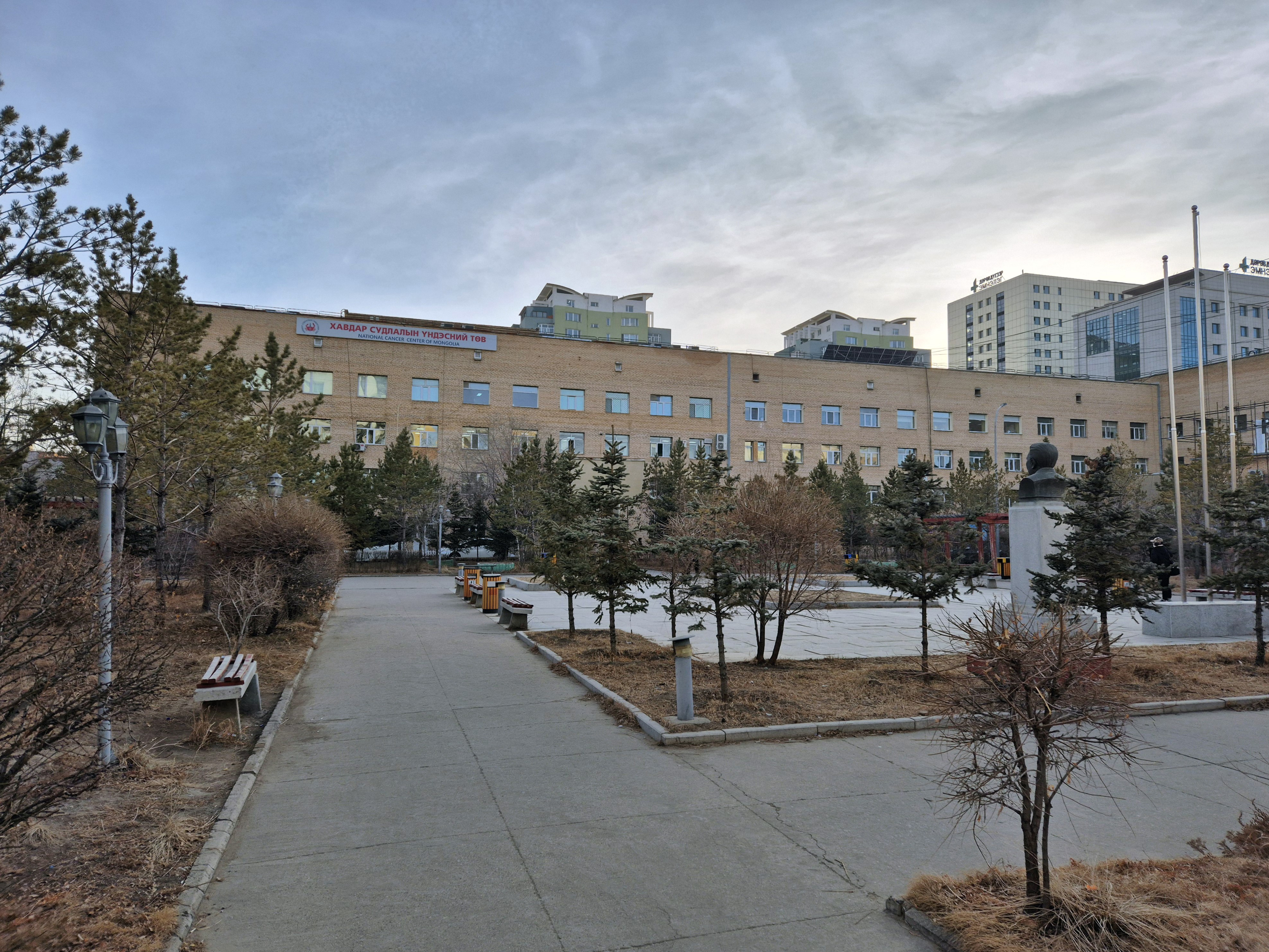
National Cancer Center of Mongolia

There has been a reduction in the number of public hospitals since 1998. The number of private hospitals (mostly very small) and clinics has increased from 683 in 2005 to 1184 in 2011.

==== Hospitals in Ulaanbaatar ====
- Intermed Hospital a private hospital established in 2014
- Achtan Hospital
- Grand Med Hospital
- Second State Central Hospital
- Songdo Hospital, private, associated with the Bumrungrad International Hospital
- First Central Hospital of Mongolia, established in 1925. Formerly known as Hospital-1. Rebuilt 1971 with assistance of the Czech Republic. A tertiary centre with 13 departments, 180 doctors and 544 beds.
- National Traumatology and Orthopedics Research Center, single largest trauma center in the country
- Yonsei Friendship Hospital
- Third State Central Hospital, the only hospital with a stroke center.

=== Pharmacies ===
132 items are included on the Essential Drugs List. If they are prescribed in the public health system pharmacies are reimbursed for 50-80% of the price, which is controlled. Medication is not always available in rural areas. There are 5 traditional medicine manufacturing units and they produce more than 200 types of traditional medicine. The total value in 2009 was US$1.4 million. 30 traditional products have been registered and some are included on the Essential Drugs List.
