= List of Buddhist temples in Mongolia =

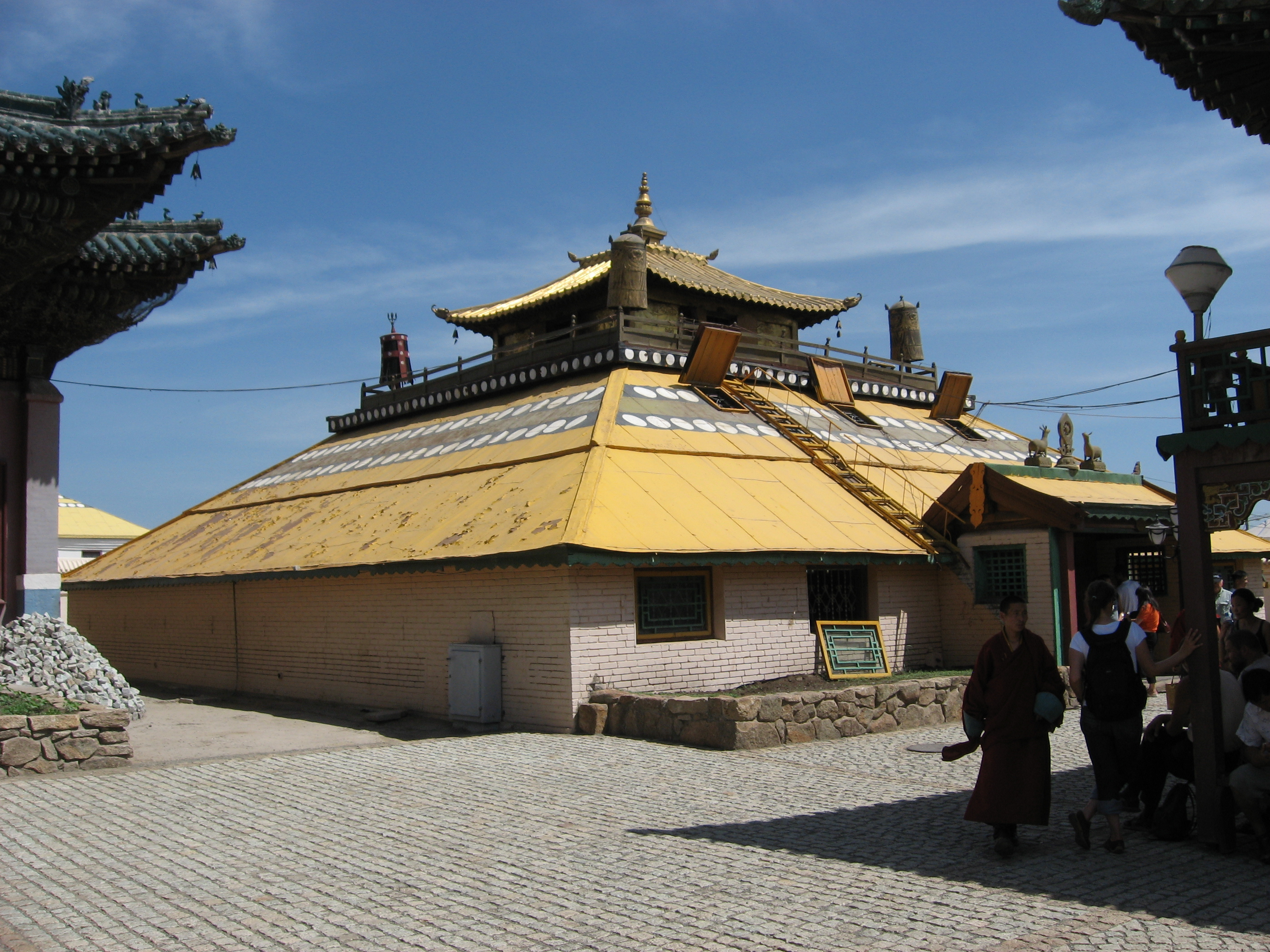
Golden Temple at Gandan Monastery in Ulaanbaatar

This is a list of Buddhist temples, monasteries, stupas, and pagodas in Mongolia for which there are Wikipedia articles, sorted by location.

== Dornogovi ==
- Khamar Monastery

== Khentii ==
- Baldan Bereeven Monastery

== Khövsgöl ==
- Danzandarjaa Monastery

== Övörkhangai ==
- Erdene Zuu Monastery
- Shankh Monastery
- Tövkhön Monastery

== Selenge ==
- Amarbayasgalant Monastery
- Shankh Monastery

== Ulaanbaatar ==
- Brown Palace
- Choijin Lama Temple
- Gandantegchinlen Monastery
- Green Palace
- Yellow Palace

== See also ==
- Buddhism in Mongolia
- Jebtsundamba Khutuktu
- Khambo Lama
- List of Buddhist temples
