= List of historical cities and towns of Mongolia =

This is a List of historical cities and towns of Mongolia. Mongolia is a landlocked country in East and Central Asia. It is bordered by Russia to the north and China to the south, east and west. Ulaanbaatar, the capital and largest city, is home to about 45% of the population.

== Special characteristics ==
"Mongolian cities" means those cities that were built in Mongolia as well those built in areas directly under Mongol influence. The special characteristic of Mongolian historical cities is that they came into being amidst a predominantly nomadic society. It is a misunderstanding to assume that there were no cities in Mongolia, or that all of the people were entirely nomadic all through their history. Based on current research, Mongolia's tradition of cities goes back over 2000 years.

== Historical towns and settlements ==
=== Prehistoric settlements ===
- Tamsagbulag Neolithic Settlement, Khalkhgol sum, Dornod Province
- Norovlin Neolithic Settlement, Bulgan sum, Dornod Province

=== Xiongnu period (209 BC-AD 93) ===
- Lungtang
- Lungcheng (Mongolian: Luut; Dragon City), capital of the Xiongnu Empire, Orkhon River valley
- Lungzi
- City built by Zhaoxin in 120 BC as ordered by the Shanyu
- Kherlen Tsagaan Aral
- Terelj Hasar Balgas
- Bayanbulag Balgas
- Tsenkher Gol Kherem
- Shuvuutiin Gol Kherem

=== Rouran period (AD 330 - 555) ===
- Mume, capital of the Rouran Khaganate, Orkhon River valley
- Lungcheng

=== Göktürk and Uighur period (AD 555-840) ===
- Toba Khan's Ord
- Bilge Khan's Ord
- Khar Els
- Khar Balgas
- Baibalyk
- Kharkhurem

=== Khitan Liao period (AD 907-1125) ===
- Zuun kherem
- Baruun kherem
- Bars khot
- Chin Tolgoin Balgas (Zhenzhou, built in AD 994)
- Khar Bukhyn Balgas

=== Mongol Empire and Yuan period (AD 1206-1368) ===
- Khaidu Khan's Ord
- Tenduk
- Tataryn Kherem
- Genghis Khan's Four Ordos
- Karakorum, capital of the Mongol Empire
- Suurin
- Tosokh
- Shar Ord
- Khokh nuuriin Ord
- Ongiin Ord
- Khogshin Teeliin Balgas
- Tsagaan Balgas
- Arlyn Balgas

=== Northern Yuan period (AD 1368-1635) ===
- Choir - 1691
- Tsagaan Baishin (or White Palace of Tsogt Taij)
- Ikh Khuree (now the capital city Ulaanbaatar) - 1639
- Khovd (city) - In 1685 founded by Galdan Boshugtu Khan on the bank of the Khovd River.
- Tsetserleg (city) - 1631. In 1586 the first monastery founded.
- Ulaangom - 1686?

=== Qing period (AD 1691-1911) ===
- Mörön (city) - 1809
- Choibalsan (city) - 1823
- Uliastai - 1833

...

== Architectural heritages in Mongolia ==
- Choijin Lama Temple
- Brown Palace
- Green Palace
- Yellow Palace
- White Palace
- Erdene Zuu Monastery
- Gandantegchinlen Monastery
- Manjusri Monastery
- Category:Buddhist monasteries in Mongolia

== See also ==
- Architecture of Mongolia
- Culture of Mongolia
- History of Mongolia
- List of cities in Mongolia
