= Bogd Khaan Memorial Garden =

Memorial garden in Khan Uul, Ulaanbaatar, Mongolia

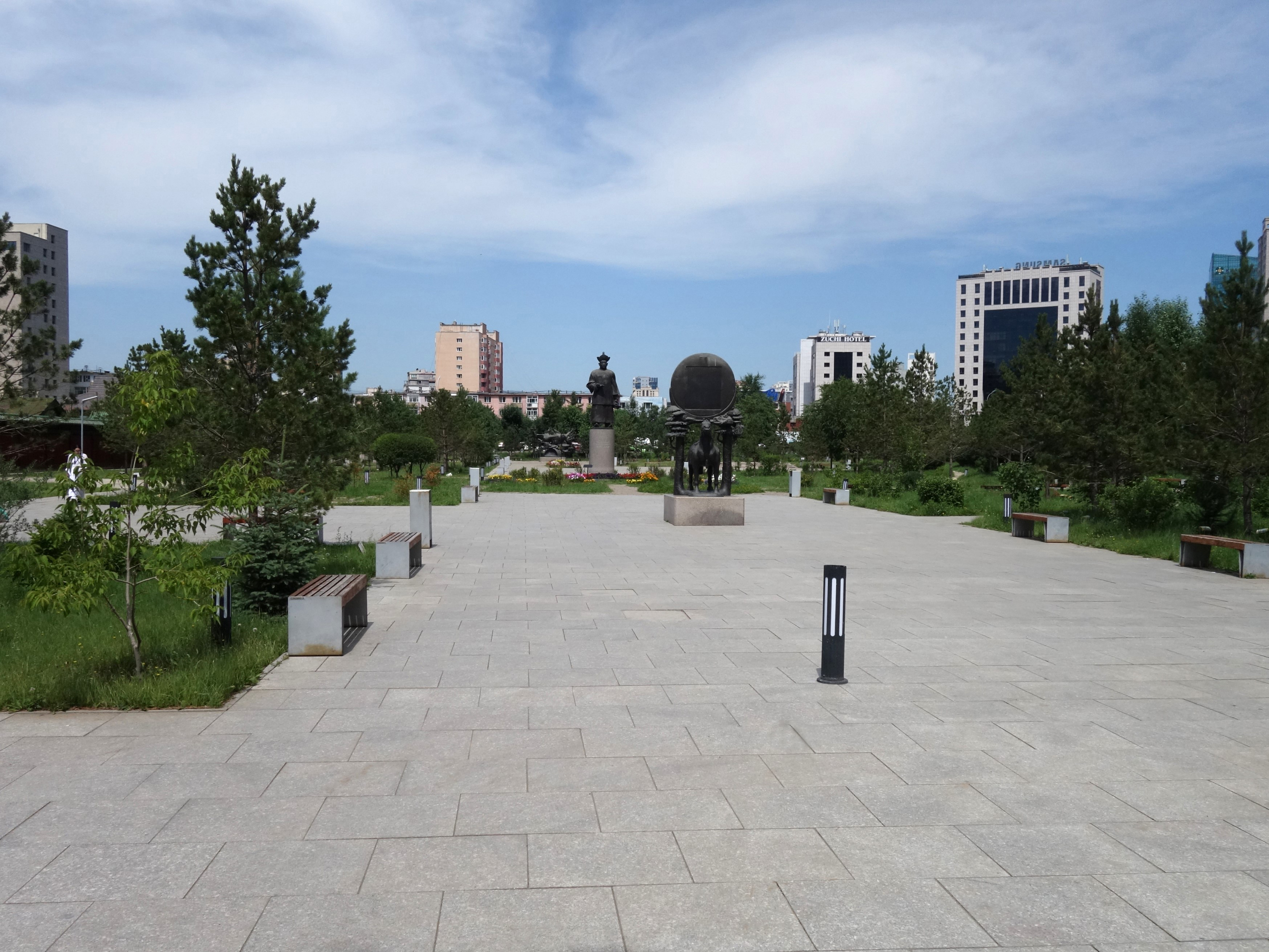
- Interactive map of Bogd Khaan Memorial Garden
- Type: memorial garden
- Location: Khan Uul, Ulaanbaatar, Mongolia
- Coordinates: 47°53′54″N 106°54′29″E
- Area: 1.4 hectares (3.5 acres)
- Opening: 24 September 2020
- Designer: L. Gankhuyag

The Bogd Khaan Memorial Garden is a memorial garden in Khan Uul District, Ulaanbaatar, Mongolia dedicated to Bogd Khan.

== History ==
The statue of Bogd Khan was erected at the garden in 2019. The opening ceremony of the memorial garden was held on 24 September 2020. The ceremony was attended by Prime Minister Ukhnaagiin Khürelsükh and other government officials.

== Architecture ==
The memorial garden consists of pedestrian paths, green area, flower field, sculptures and the statue of Bogd Khan. It is designed by L.Gankhuyag. The memorial garden spreads over an area of 1.4 hectares. It sits beside the Green Palace.

== See also ==
- Geography of Mongolia
