= Zaysan =

Zaysan or Zaisan (Cyrillic: Зайсан) can refer to:

- Lake Zaysan in eastern Kazakhstan
- Zaysan (town) or Zaisan, Kazakhstan
- Zaysan District in East Kazakhstan Province, Kazakhstan
- Zaisan Airport, Kazakhstan
- Zaisan Bridge in Ulaanbaatar, Mongolia
- Zaisan Memorial in Ulaanbaatar, Mongolia
- Zaisan (title)

== See also ==
- Zaisan mole vole
