= Winter Palace (disambiguation) =

The Winter Palace in St. Petersburg, Russia, was the winter residence of the Russian tsars and now part of the State Hermitage Museum.

Winter Palace may also refer to:

- Winter Palace of the Bogd Khan, Ulan Bator
- Winter Palace of Prince Eugene, Vienna
- Winter Palace Hotel, Luxor, a hotel on the banks of the River Nile in Egypt
- Abbasid Palace in Baghdad, Iraq as mentioned in Assassin's Creed Mirage
- "Winter Palace", a song from Trans-Siberian Orchestra's 2012 EP Dreams of Fireflies (On a Christmas Night)
- Hasmonean royal winter palaces
