= List of cities in Mongolia =

Major cities in Mongolia and outer Düüregs of Ulaanbaatar

This list includes cities in Mongolia of more than 7,500 inhabitants. The results are from the census of January 5, 2000 as well as from a population estimation for the end of 2008. If 2008 year data was not accessible, the closest and most reliable data was used and noted by an index.

The population for previous years show the historical significance of population growth and urbanisation throughout Mongolia.

== Population data ==
The higher level administrative unit is the aimag, except for Ulaanbaatar which administers its own district (Nalaikh and Baganuur are administered by Ulaanbaatar). The numbers of inhabitants relate to the cities proper without surrounding districts.

List of Mongolian cities
Rank	Name	1979 est.	1989 est.	2000 census	2010 Census	Change since 2000 Census	Province/Municipality
1	Ulaanbaatar (Note: Includes Nalaikh, Baganuur and Bagakhangai)	396,300	540,600	760,077	1,144,954	▲299,715	Ulaanbaatar
2	Erdenet	29,100	-	70,950	83,379	▲12,429	Orkhon Province
3	Darkhan	49,100	-	65,791	74,738	▲8,947	Darkhan-Uul Province
4	Choibalsan	28,500	37,300	40,123	38,537	▼1,586	Dornod Province
5	Mörön	16,500	21,300	28,903	35,789	▲6,886	Khövsgöl Province
6	Nalaikh	-	-	23,600	30,049	▲6,449	Ulaanbaatar
7	Bayankhongor	16,300	21,200	22,066	29,817	▲7,751	Bayankhongor Province
8	Ölgii	18,700	27,200	25,791	29,392	▲3,601	Bayan-Ölgii Province
9	Khovd	17,500	24,100	25,765	29,012	▲3,247	Khovd Province
10	Arvaikheer	12,300	16,900	19,058	27,162	▲8,104	Övörkhangai Province
11	Ulaangom	17,900	22,900	25,993	27,152	▲1,159	Uvs Province
12	Baganuur	-	-	21,100	22,210	▲1,110	Ulaanbaatar
14	Sainshand	11,100	10,300	18,290	20,515	▲2,225	Dornogovi Province
13	Tsetserleg	14,700	20,300	18,519	20,604	▲2,085	Arkhangai Province
15	Sükhbaatar	14,300	19,600	22,374	19,662	▼2,712	Selenge Province
16	Öndörkhaan	11,100	14,400	18,003	19,000	▲997	Khentii Province
17	Dalanzadgad	10,000	14,300	14,050	18,740	▲4,690	Ömnögovi Province
18	Züünkharaa	11,400	-	15,000^{(2004)}	18,002	Steady	Selenge Province
19	Uliastai	15,400	20,300	18,154	17,468	▼686	Zavkhan Province
20	Altai	13,700	18,800	15,741	16,542	▲801	Govi-Altai Province
21	Baruun-Urt	11,600	16,100	15,133	16,130	▲997	Sükhbaatar Province
22	Mandalgovi	10,200	16,100	14,517	13,660	▼857	Dundgovi Province
23	Zuunmod	9,800	15,800	14,837	13,330	▼1,507	Töv Province
24	Zamyn-Üüd	-	-	5,486	13,285	▲7,799	Dornogovi Province
25	Bulgan	11,300	12,800	12,681	11,320	▼1,361	Bulgan Province
26	Kharkhorin	-	-	13,648	10,847	▼2,801	Övörkhangai Province
27	Choir	4,500	-	8,983	9,708	▲725	Govisümber Province
28	Bor-Öndör	-	-	6,406^{(2001)}	8,080	Steady	Khentii Province
29	Sharyngol	-	-	8,902	7,795	▼1,107	Darkhan-Uul Province

Colour key:

- Salmon cells indicate that the population has declined or experienced minimal (<1%) growth.
- Light green cells indicate a growth between 1-2%.
- Dark green cells indicate a growth of greater than or equal to 2%.

== See also ==
- History of Mongolia
- List of historical cities and towns of Mongolia
- List of city listings by country
