= Khan Uul =

District in Ulaanbaatar, Mongolia

Coordinates: 47.9167°N 106.9167°E

Khan-Uul District Хан-Уул дүүрэг ᠬᠠᠨᠠᠭᠤᠯᠠᠲᠡᠭᠦᠷᠭᠡ
- Municipal District
- Flag Coat of arms
- Interactive map of Khan-Uul District
- Country: Mongolia
- Municipality: Ulaanbaatar
- Ajilchin raion of Ulaanbaatar: 1965
- Reorganized as district: 1992

Government
  - Body: Citizens' Representatives Khural of the Khan-Uul district
  - Governor of District: B.Tseren, MPP

Area
  - Total: 503.51 km^{2} (194.41 sq mi)

Population (2025)
  - Total: 283,010
  - Density: 562.07/km^{2} (1,455.8/sq mi)
- Time zone: UTC+8 (UTC + 8)
- Website: khanuul.mn

Khan-Uul (Mongolian: Хан-Уул [χaɴ‿ʊ́ːɬ]; lit. 'Mount Khan') is one of nine districts of Ulaanbaatar. It is subdivided into 24 subdistricts. This district is located in the south, at the foot of one of the four hills of Ulaanbaatar—the Bogd Khan Uul.

== Educational institutions ==
- Orkhon University

== Tourist attractions ==
- AIC Steppe Arena
- Art Space 976+
- Bogd Khaan Memorial Garden
- Buyant Ukhaa Sport Palace
- G-Mobile Arena
- Green Palace (Winter Palace of the Bogd Khan)
- Khan-Uul Stadium
- Misheel Botanical Garden
- National Sports Stadium
- Zaisan Memorial

== Transportation ==
- Yarmag Bridge
- Zaisan Bridge
