= Winter Palace of the Bogd Khan =

Museum in Khan Uul, Ulaanbaatar, Mongolia

- Богд хааны ордон музей (Mongolian)
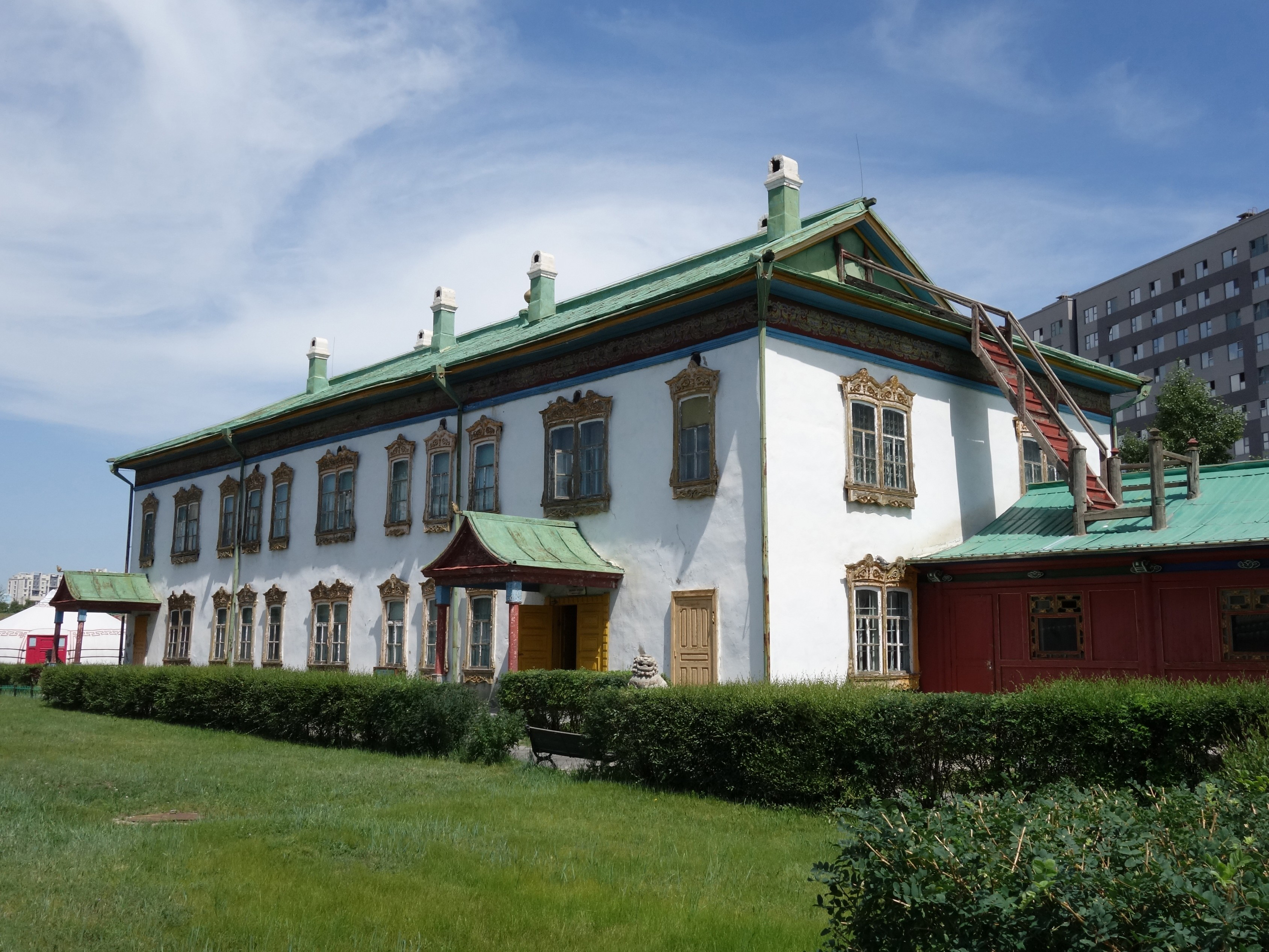

- Location within Mongolia
- Established: 1903
- Location: Zaisan Street, Khan Uul, Ulaanbaatar, Mongolia
- Coordinates: 47°53′51″N 106°54′24″E
- Collection size: 8,600 exhibits
- Visitors: average of 40,000 annually
- Director: O.Mendsaikhan
- Website: Official website

The Winter Palace of the Bogd Khan, or the Bogd Khan Palace Museum, is a museum complex located in Khan Uul District, Ulaanbaatar, Mongolia. It was part of a larger complex called the "Green Palace", an imperial residence of the eighth Jebtsundamba Khutughtu, who was later proclaimed Bogd Khan, or ruler of Mongolia. Alongside being the oldest museum, it is also considered to hold the biggest collection in Mongolia. The palace is the only one left of four original residences of the Bogd Khan.

== History ==
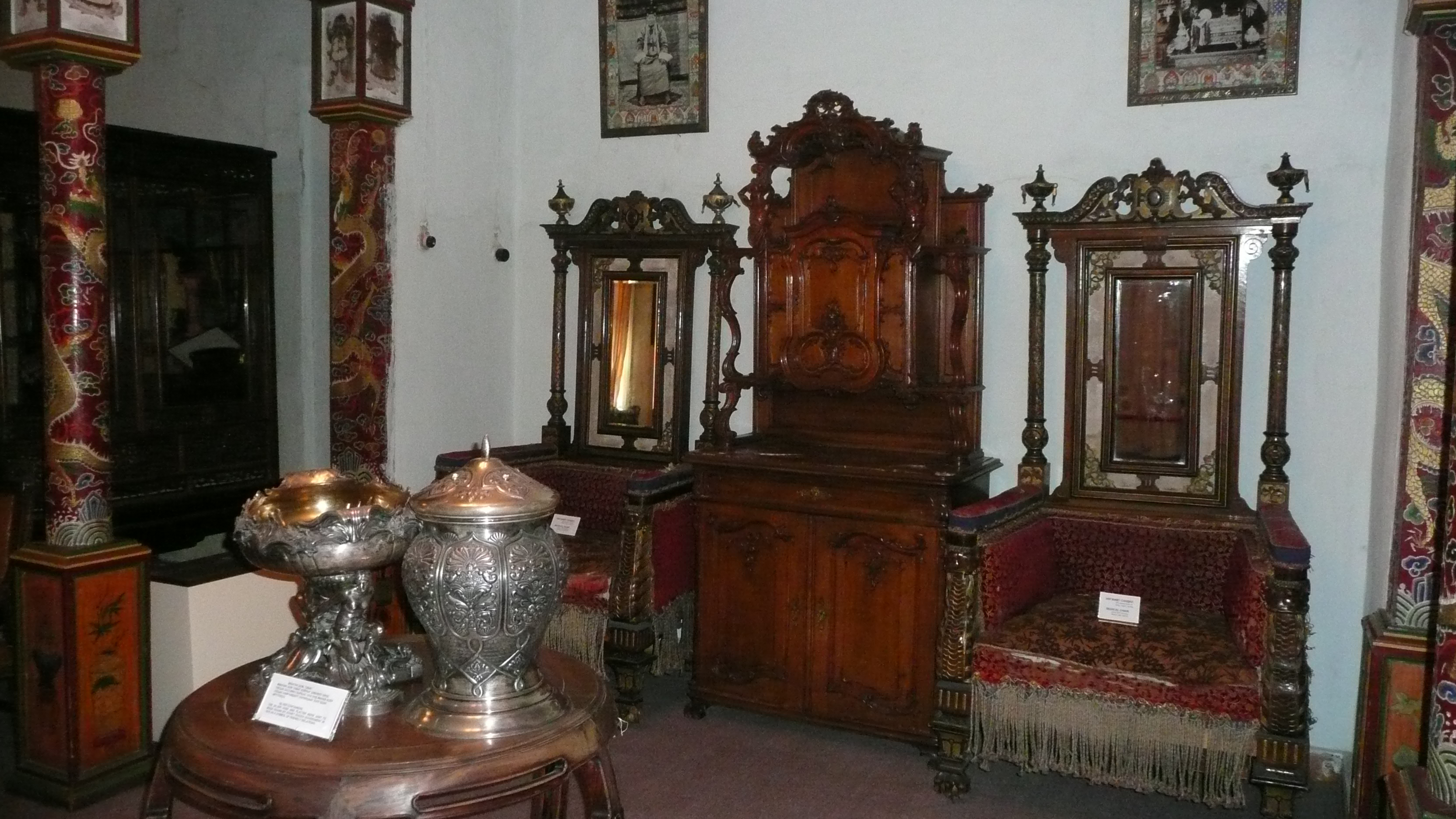
Museum displays inside the palace

The old city of Ikh Khüree, once it was set up as a permanent capital, had a number of palaces and noble residences in an area called Öndgiin sürgiin nutag. The Bogd Khan had four main imperial residences, which were located between the Middle (Dund gol) and Tuul rivers. The summer palace was called Erdmiin dalai buyan chuulgan süm or Bogd khaanii serüün ord. Other palaces were the White Palace (Tsagaan süm, or Gьngaa dejidlin), and the Pandelin Palace (also called Naro Kha Chod süm), which was situated on the left bank of the Tuul River. Some of the palaces were also used for religious purposes.

Built between 1893 and 1903, the complex is one of the few Mongolian historical attractions which have neither been destroyed by the Soviets or the Communist forces. With the Winter Palace, the Gate of Peace and Happiness, the Cooling Pavilion as well as 6 temples, each containing Buddhist artwork, scripture and thangka, such as Naidan Temple and Makhranz Temple, the palace complex consists of a total of about 20 structures. The museum has about 8,600 exhibits and receives over 40,000 visitors annually. On display are many of the Bogd Khan's possessions, such as his throne and bed, his collection of art and stuffed animals, his ornate ceremonial ger, a pair of ceremonial boots given to the Khan by Russian Tsar Nicholas II, and also a jewelled regalia worn by the Bogd Khan's pet elephant. It currently runs its operations under the Ministry of Education, Culture, Science and Sports of Mongolia.
