= Yarmag Bridge =

Bridge in Khan-Uul, Ulaanbaatar, Mongolia

Yarmag Bridge Яармагийн гүүр
- Coordinates: 47°53′14.9″N 106°51′51.4″E
- Carries: land vehicle
- Crosses: Tuul River
- Locale: Khan Uul, Ulaanbaatar, Mongolia
- Official name: Яармагийн гүүр
- Other name: Гүүр

Characteristics
- Material: Concrete
- Total length: 250 m
- Width: 20.5 m
- Load limit: 20t
- No. of lanes: 5
- Capacity: 20,000–30,000 cars per day

History
- Constructed by: China Railway 20 Bureau Group Co.
- Construction start: April 2017
- Construction cost: US$30.26 million
- Opened: 2 November 2018

Statistics
- Daily traffic: Not that much midday, lots of traffic during the morning and the evening

The Yarmag Bridge (Mongolian: Яармагийн гүүр) is a bridge in Khan Uul, Ulaanbaatar, Mongolia. It connects the main route from the city center of Ulaanbaatar to Chinggis Khaan International Airport.

== History ==
The construction of Yarmag Bridge was done to add the traffic capacity of the old Yarmag Bridge. The construction of the bridge stated in April 2017 with its groundbreaking ceremony was held on 5 June 2017. It was built by the construction team who worked 24 hours a day in shifts. The bridge was opened on 2 November 2018 from the original deadline 31 January 2019. In 2020, a bike lane was planned to be built alongside the bridge.

== Technical specifications ==
The bridge was built by China Railway 20 Bureau Group Co. and the construction was supervised by Ulaanbaatar Road Development Office. The bridge spans over a length of 250 meters with a width of 20.5 meters. There is also a 50-meter wide tunnel constructed under the bridge. It has two lanes on one given direction with a total capacity of 20,000–30,000 cars per day. Both the old and new bridge cross the Tuul River. The bridge connects the main route from the city center of Ulaanbaatar to Chinggis Khaan International Airport.

== Finance ==
The construction of the bridge is part of the larger Yarmag Overpass project. It was financed by the Government of China on aid loan and export buyer's credit for US$30.26 million.

== See also ==
- Transport in Mongolia
