= Misheel Botanical Garden =

Botanical garden in Khan Uul, Ulaanbaatar, Mongolia

- Мишээл байгаль орчин, танин мэдэхүйн хүрээлэн
- Interactive map of Misheel Botanical Garden
- Type: botanical garden
- Location: Khan Uul, Ulaanbaatar, Mongolia
- Coordinates: 47°53′19″N 106°53′23″E
- Area: 11 hectares (27 acres)
- Established: 2021
- Founder: Misheel Group LLC

The Misheel Botanical Garden (Mongolian: Мишээл байгаль орчин, танин мэдэхүйн хүрээлэн) is a botanical garden in Khan Uul District, Ulaanbaatar, Mongolia.

== History ==
The plan to establish the garden started in 2019 between Misheel Group and Ulaanbaatar City Council. It was established in 2021, at a cost of MNT2.1 billion.

== Geography ==
The garden spans over an area of 11 hectares. It is located at the bank of Tuul River.

== Architecture ==
The garden features an observation view over the Tuul River.

== See also ==
- Geography of Mongolia
