= Zaisan Bridge =

Bridge in Khan-Uul, Ulaanbaatar, Mongolia

Zaisan Bridge Зайсангийн гүүр
- Coordinates: 47°53′25.2″N 106°54′34.9″E
- Carries: Land vehicles
- Crosses: Tuul River
- Locale: Khan Uul, Ulaanbaatar, Mongolia

Characteristics
- Total length: 225 m

History
- Opened: 1968 (old bridge); September 2023 (new bridge)

Location
- Interactive map of Zaisan Bridge

The Zaisan Bridge (Mongolian: Зайсангийн гүүр) is a bridge in Khan Uul, Ulaanbaatar, Mongolia.

== History ==
The bridge was originally constructed in 1968 for single lane one-way traffic. The construction process was interrupted by a flood. A new bridge, west of the earlier one, was designed in 2012 and completed in September 2023. It carries one-way traffic on two lanes. On 1 November 2024, the original bridge was closed and began to be dismantled.

== Technical specifications ==
The bridge has a length of 225 metres. The new bridge is a steel cable-stayed reinforced concrete structure with three sets of 36 cables.

== See also ==
- Transport in Mongolia
