= Choijin Lama Temple =

Temple in Sükhbaatar, Ulaanbaatar, Mongolia

Choijin Lama Temple Чойжин ламын сүм 興仁寺
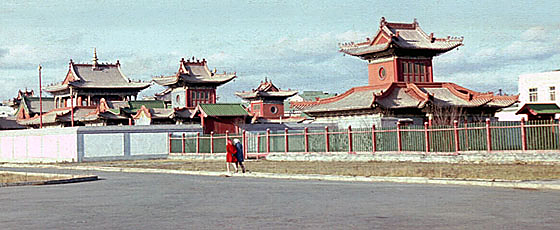

- Location within Mongolia

Religion
- Affiliation: Tibetan Buddhism

Location
- Location: Sükhbaatar, Ulaanbaatar, Mongolia
- Country: Mongolia
- Interactive map of Choijin Lama Temple; Чойжин ламын сүм 興仁寺
- Coordinates: 47°54′54″N 106°55′06″E

Architecture
- Style: Chinese, Mongol and Tibetan influences
- Established: 1908

The Choijin Lama Temple (Mongolian: Чойжин ламын сүм; Official name given by Manchu Qing Emperor Guangxu (1871 – 1908): Mongolian: Өршөөлийг хөгжүүлэгч сүм, ᠥᠷᠥᠰᠢᠶᠡᠯ ᠢ
ᠬᠥᠭᠵᠢᠭᠦᠯᠦᠭᠴᠢ
ᠰᠦᠮ᠎ᠡ; Manchu: ᡤᠣᠰᡳᠨ ᠪᡝ
ᠶᡝᠠᡩᠠᠪᡡᡥᡝ
ᠵᡠᡴᡨᡝᡥᡝᠨ Gosimbin Jadenblh juktenen, Tibetan: བརྩེ་འཕེལ་གླིང་།།, ZWPY: Brtse'phel gling, English; Compassion Perfection Temple, Chinese:興仁寺) is a Buddhist monastery in Sükhbaatar District, Ulaanbaatar, Mongolia.

The complex consists of six temples originally occupied by the brother of the ruler the Eighth Bogd Jetsun Dampa Khan, Choijin Lama Luvsankhaidav, who was the state oracle and 'Precious Wisdom and Clear Devotion' Khutugtu at the time. The complex was begun in 1904 and completed in 1908, in honor of the State Oracle Lama Lubsanhaidub /Losang Kedrup/, brother of the eighth Bogd Khan. The Choijin Lama Museum was originally a Buddhist temple complex, consisting of one main and five branch temples. It was active until 1937, when it was closed during the height of Communist repression against Buddhism and other religious traditions. In 1938 the complex was re-established as museum due to skillful efforts of wise people. This was how it was saved throughout communism.

The main temple features an 18th-century gilt statue of Buddha Sakyamuni with a statue of Choijin Lama Luvsankhaidav on the Buddha's right and the embalmed corpse of Baldan Choephel on his left. In addition, the temple boasts a copious collection of religious instruments, thangka paintings, silk embroideries, wood carvings, statues, and a biggest collection of cham dance masks).

The annex to the temple contains another temple, named 'Zankhang' and a central square in which Choijin Lama Luvsankhaidav performed Oracle trance rituals.

The Zuu Temple, dedicated to the Buddha Shakyamuni features papier-mache sculptures of Buddha in the past, present, and future. The 16 arhat disciples of Buddha appear on the temple walls with four Maharajas protectors shown sitting in caves on either side of the door.

The Yidam Temple was used as a place of prayer by Choijin Lama Luvsankhaidav, and therefore closed to the public. Now, it is open to public for sightseeing. In its center is a gilt bronze sculpture of one of the 84 Indian yogis, or Mahasiddha. Also depicted are the tantric gods Kalacakra, Mahamaya, Vajradhara and others with their shakti or consorts in postures of meditation that symbolize power and strength.

The fourth temple, the temple of amugulang or peace, is dedicated to the first Mongolian reincarnation of Boghda Jevzundamba, Undur Gegeen Zanabazar, (1635–1724).

Choijin Lama Temple

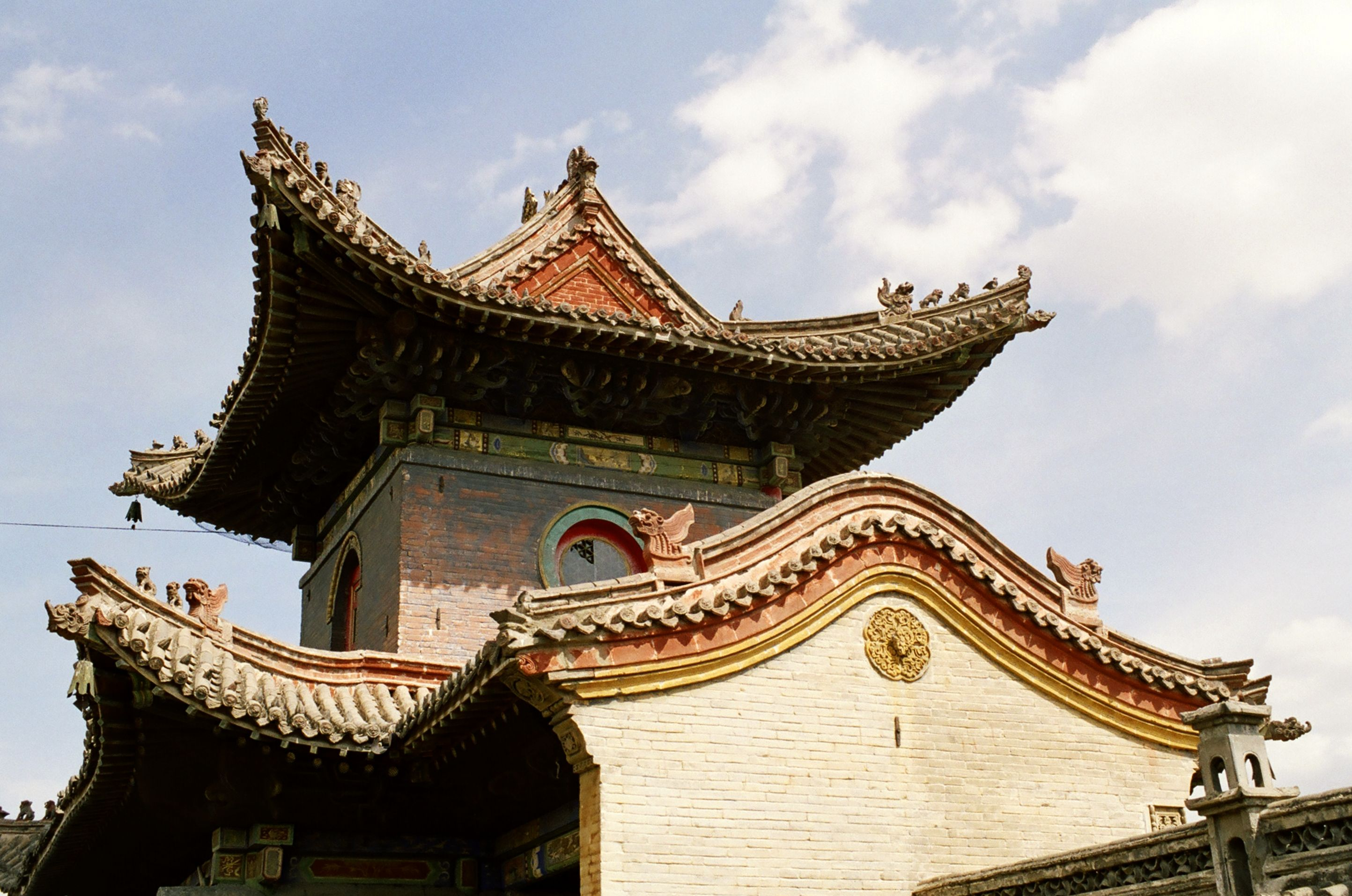
Choijin Lama Temple

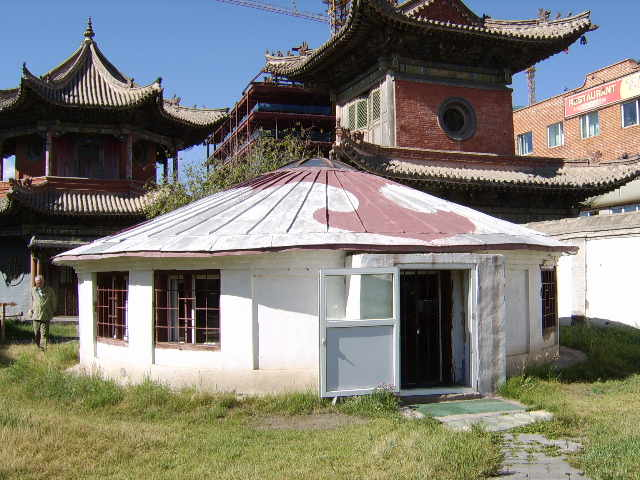
One of the prayer halls is in the shape of a ger

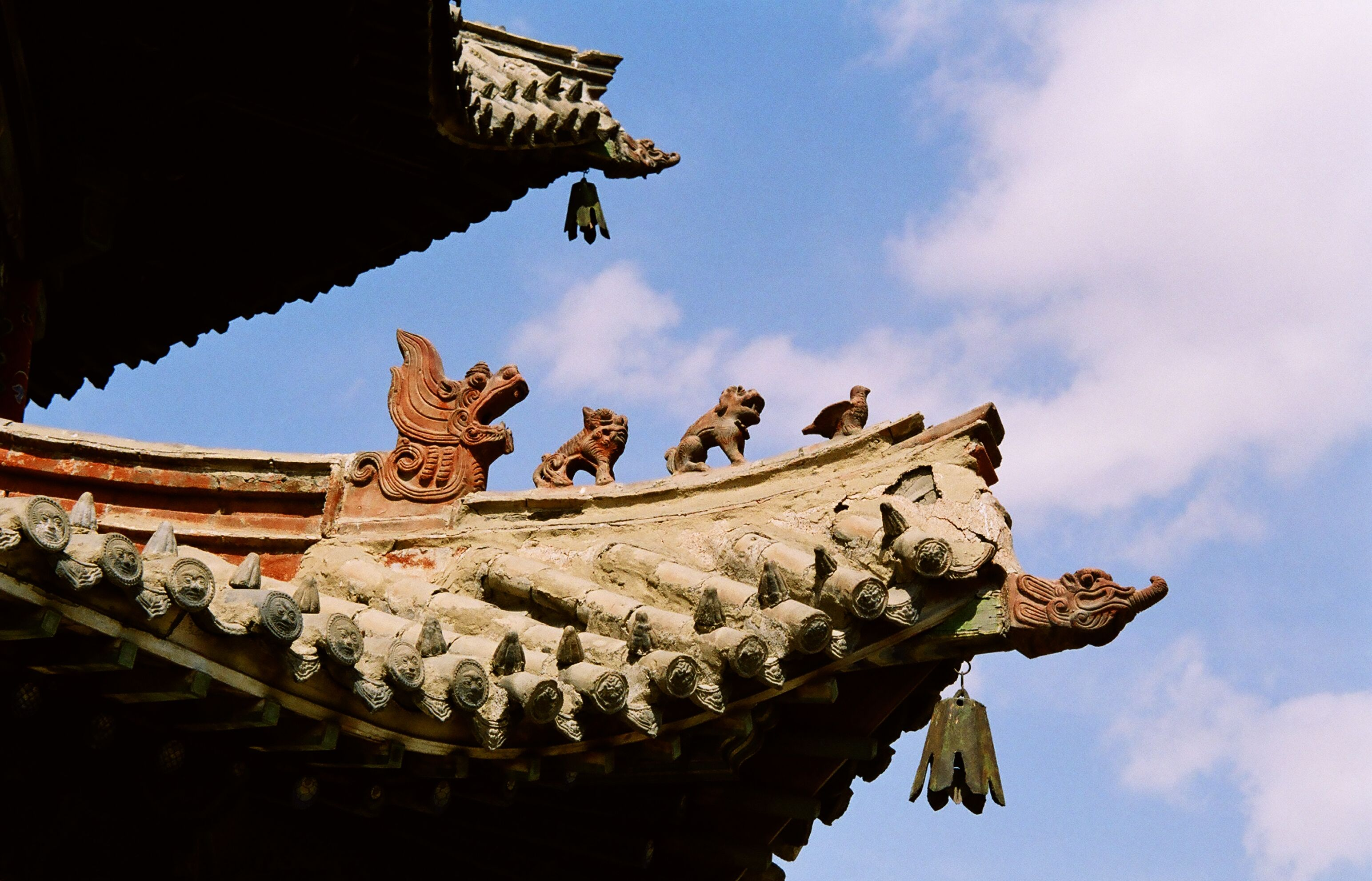
Richly decorated roof on one of the halls

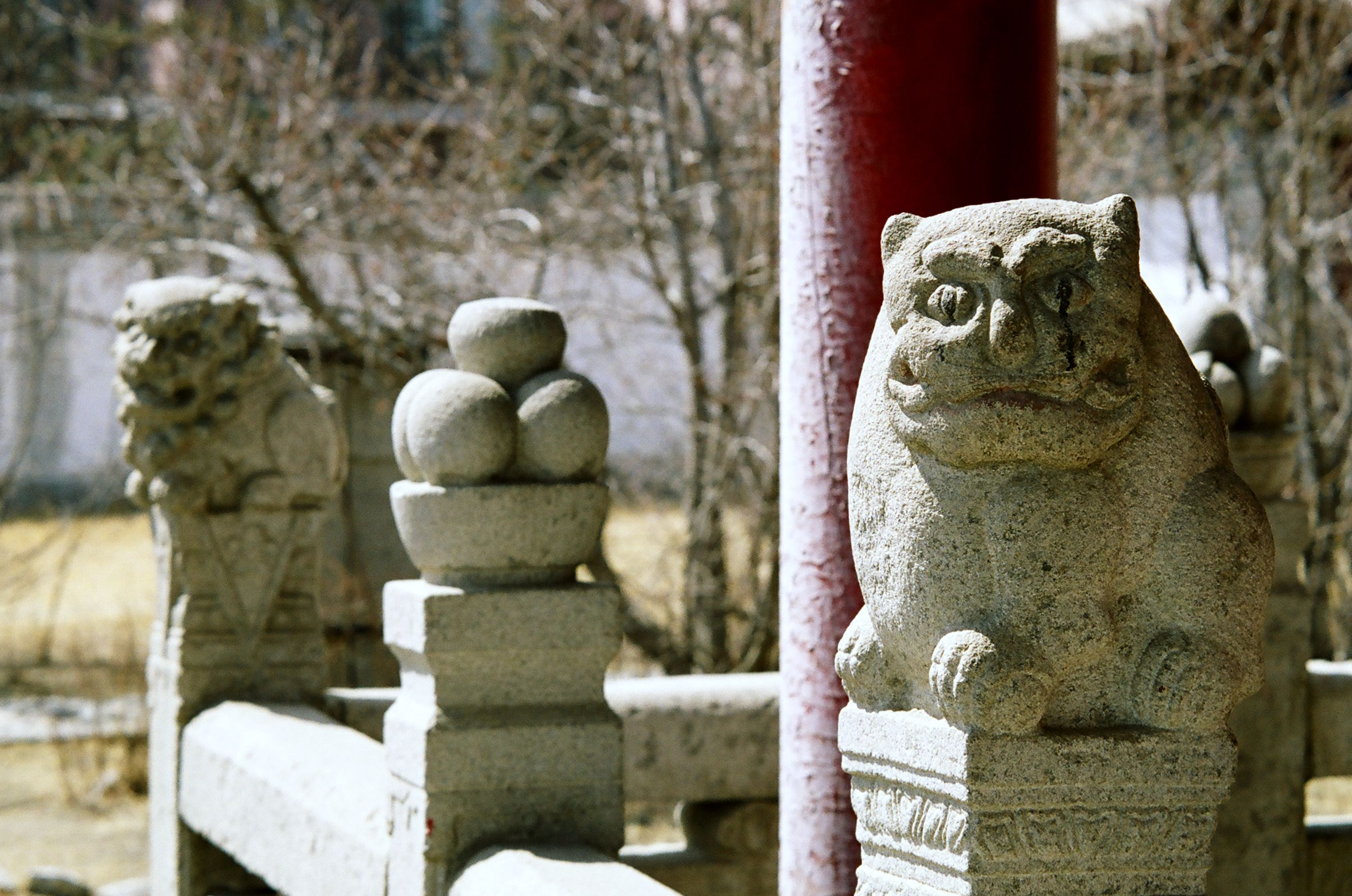
Stone lions and beasts protect the temple

== Museum ==
The museum preserves a rich heritage of Buddhist artifacts. When the monasteries were being built in Mongolia, nearly over 700 monasteries had been built but among them, Choijin Lama Temple has highly distinctive features and history. This is a sublime heritage of Mongolians' history of handcrafts, fine arts, and sculpting of the late 19th century and the beginning of the 20th century. Located in central Ulaanbaatar directly south of Sukhbaatar Square, the museum is open year-round (with reduced hours during the winter months). Explanations of the almost overwhelming collection are not as detailed as they could be, but each temple has room attendants who can provide additional material. The museum itself and its objects also show the re-emergence of Buddhism in Mongolia after Communist repression, with a particularly interesting display on Buddhist cham dancing and its modern revival.
