= Brown Palace =

Imperial summer residence in Ulaanbaatar, Mongolia

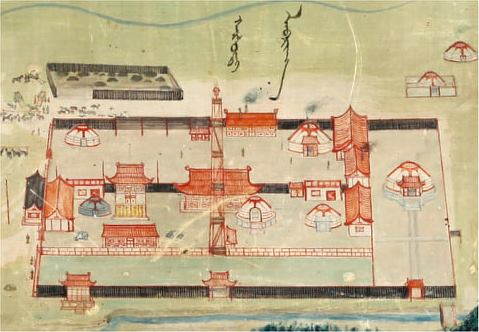
Aerial view of the palace, painting by Jugder (1913)

The Brown Palace (ᠬᠦᠷᠢᠨ ᠣᠷᠳᠣᠨ Khüren ordon) was an imperial summer residence of the Bogd Khan, ruler of Mongolia, located in Ulaanbaatar. It was also known as the Haistai Temple (ᠬᠠᠶᠢᠰᠤ ᠲᠠᠢ ᠯᠠᠪᠷᠤᠩ Great Temple of Knowledge).

== History ==
It was constructed at the Tuul River at the end of the 19th century and the beginning of the 20th century. The palace was transferred in 1924 to the communist Mongolian People's Revolutionary Party Academy and most structures were subsequently lost. The complex consisted of a main court within a wider fenced enclosure. Along with the main hall and residential yurts, it had a landmark clock tower.

A large monumental painting of it was done by Marzan Sharav and housed in the Fine Arts Zanabazar Museum.

== See also ==
- Green Palace
- Yellow Palace
- Government Palace
- Karakorum
