= Yellow Palace =

Palace in Ulaanbaatar, Mongolia

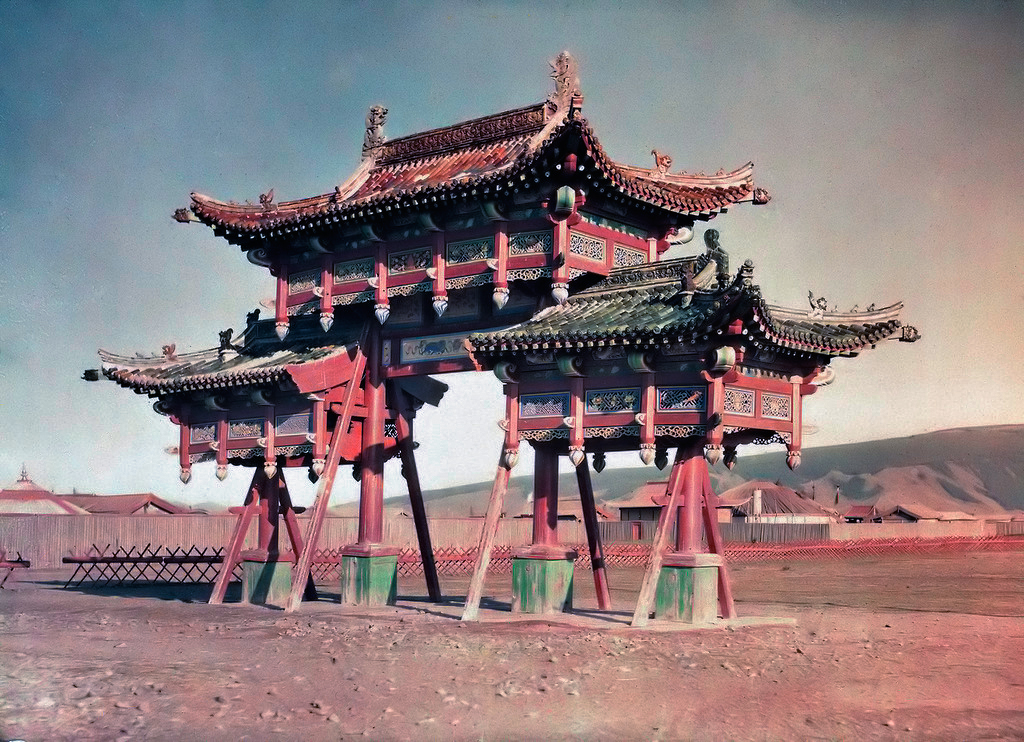
Main gate of the Yellow Palace

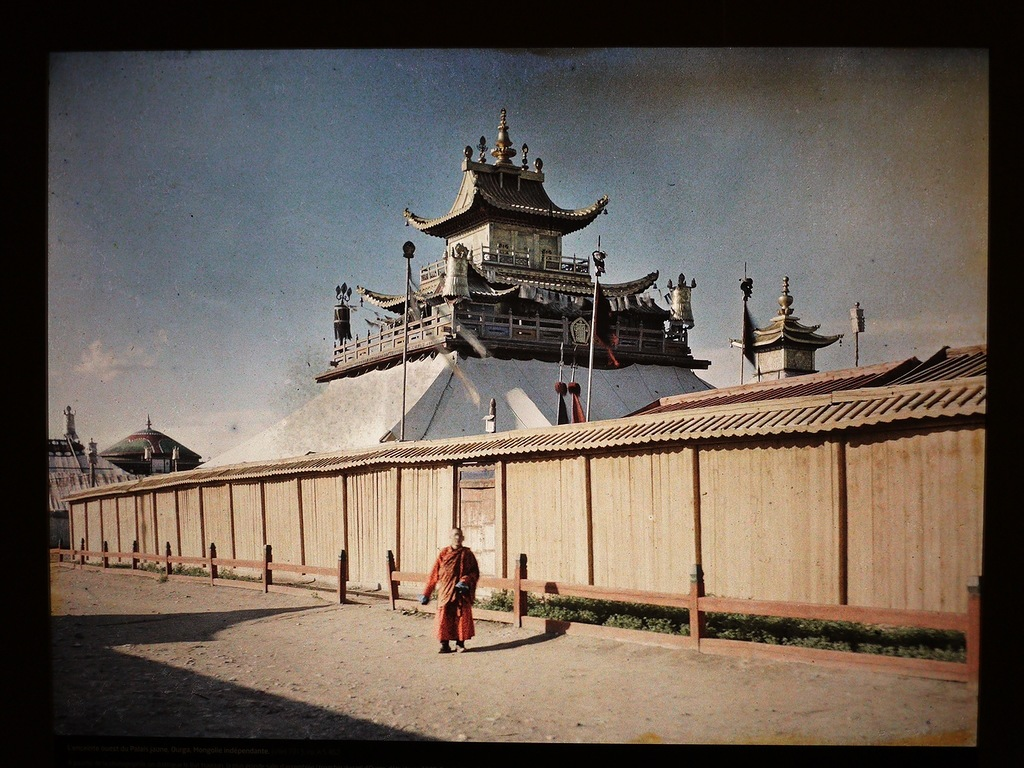
The gilded Maidar Temple and to the right the smaller roof of the Abtai Khan ger Temple

The Yellow Palace (ᠰᠢᠷ᠎ᠠ ᠣᠷᠳᠣᠨ Shar ordon) was an imperial residence of the Bogd Khan, ruler of Mongolia. It was located in the centre of Urga, today Ulaanbaatar. It was also known as the Dechingalav Temple. The structure originated in 1739.

It was one of the main residences used for state ceremonies. The site dates back to the 17th century. A new residence called the "Green Palace" was built starting in 1893. Other residences were the "White Palace" and the "Brown Palace". The Yellow Palace complex existed until the late 1930's when it was demolished by the authorities.

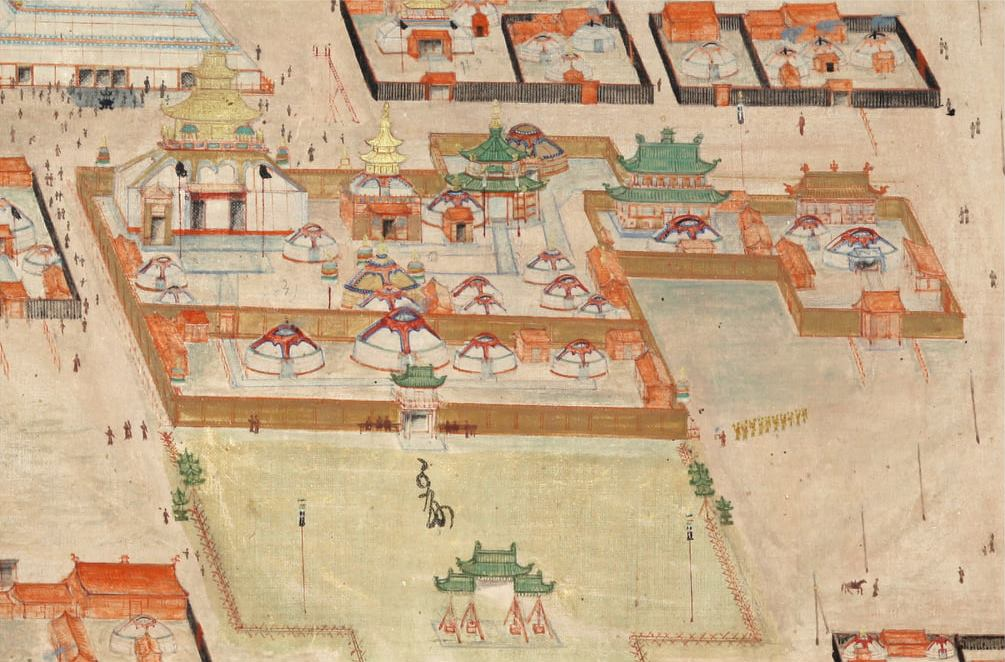
Bird's eye view drawing of the Yellow Palace complex, by Jugder (1913)

The layout consisted of a main gate towards the south in front of a large central square. Behind it was a secondary gate that led to the first enclosure where a number of large yurts were located. This was followed by the main enclosure in which the gilded three-storied Maidar Temple stood to the west, dating to 1833. To the east of it was the smaller gilded Abtai Khan ger Temple from 1585, and another eight-sided temple. A number of yurts were also located in this main enclosure. Two residential palaces were located further to the east. Located to the back of the Yellow Palace towards the northwest was the large Bat Tsagaan Temple, constructed in 1654.
