= Green Palace =

Palace in Khan-Uul, Ulaanbaatar, Mongolia

Coordinates: 47.8976°N 106.9070°E

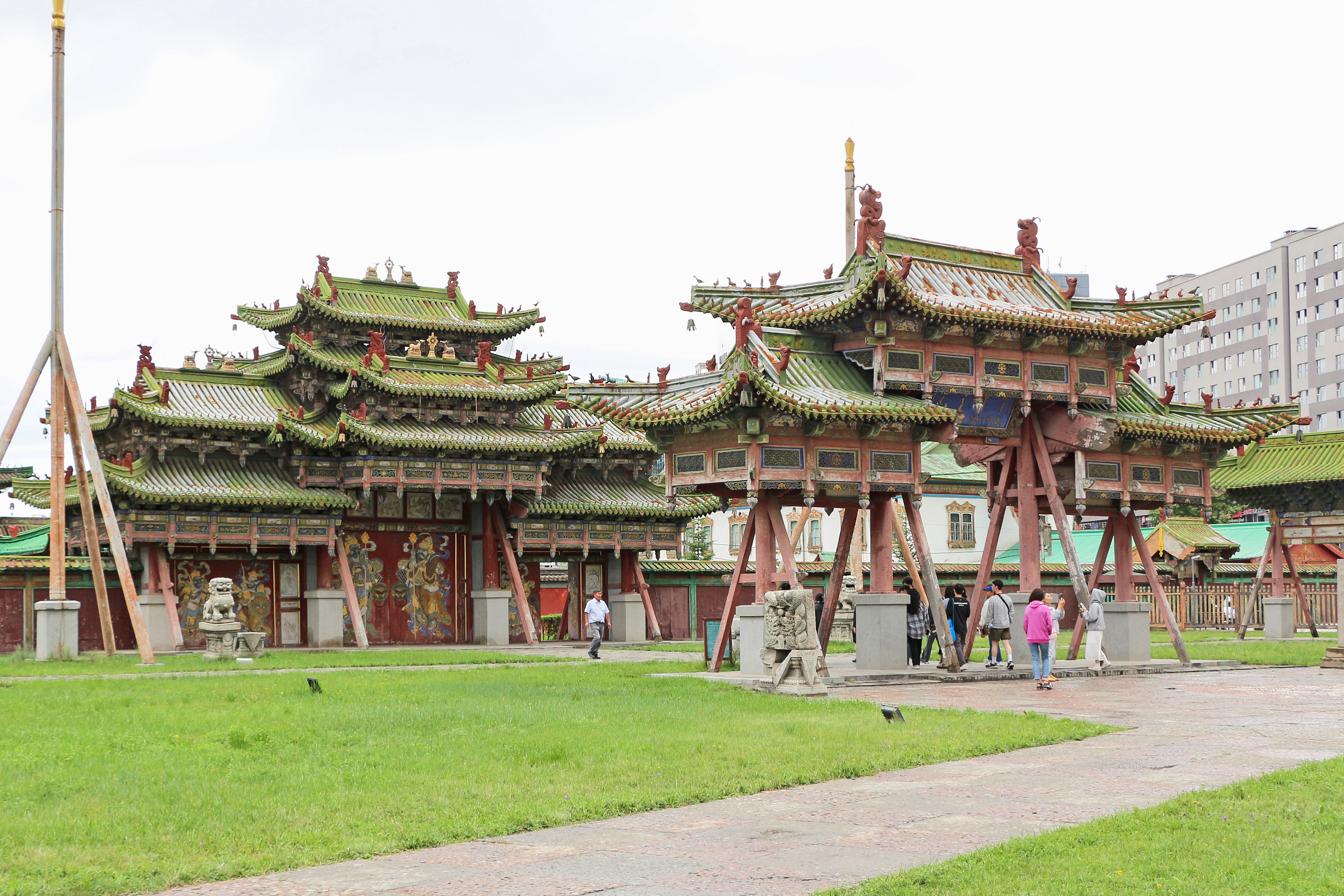
Southern gate and main gate of the Green Palace

The Green Palace (ᠨᠣᠭᠣᠭᠠᠨ ᠣᠷᠳᠣᠨ Nogoon Ordon) is the former imperial winter residence of the Bogd Khan, the former autocratic ruler of Mongolia, located in Khan Uul, Ulaanbaatar. It was also called the "Green Temple of the River" due its location.

Inside the complex is the Bogd Khan Palace Museum, housed in the Winter Palace building. Alongside being the oldest museum, it is also considered as one with the biggest collection in Mongolia. The palace is the only one left from originally four residences of the Bogd Khan.

== History ==
The old city of Ikh Khüree, once it was set up as a permanent capital, had a number of palaces and noble residences in an area called Öndgiin sürgiin nutag. The Bogd Khan had four main imperial residences, which were located between the Middle (Dund gol) and Tuul rivers. The main residence was the Yellow Palace (ᠰᠢᠷ᠎ᠠ ᠣᠷᠳᠣᠨ Shar ordon) in the centre. The summer palace was called Erdmiin dalai buyan chuulgan süm or Bogd khaanii serüün ord. Other palaces were the White Palace (Tsagaan süm, or Gьngaa dejidlin), and the Pandelin Palace (also called Naro Kha Chod süm), which was situated on the left bank of the Tuul River. Some of the palaces were also used for religious purposes.

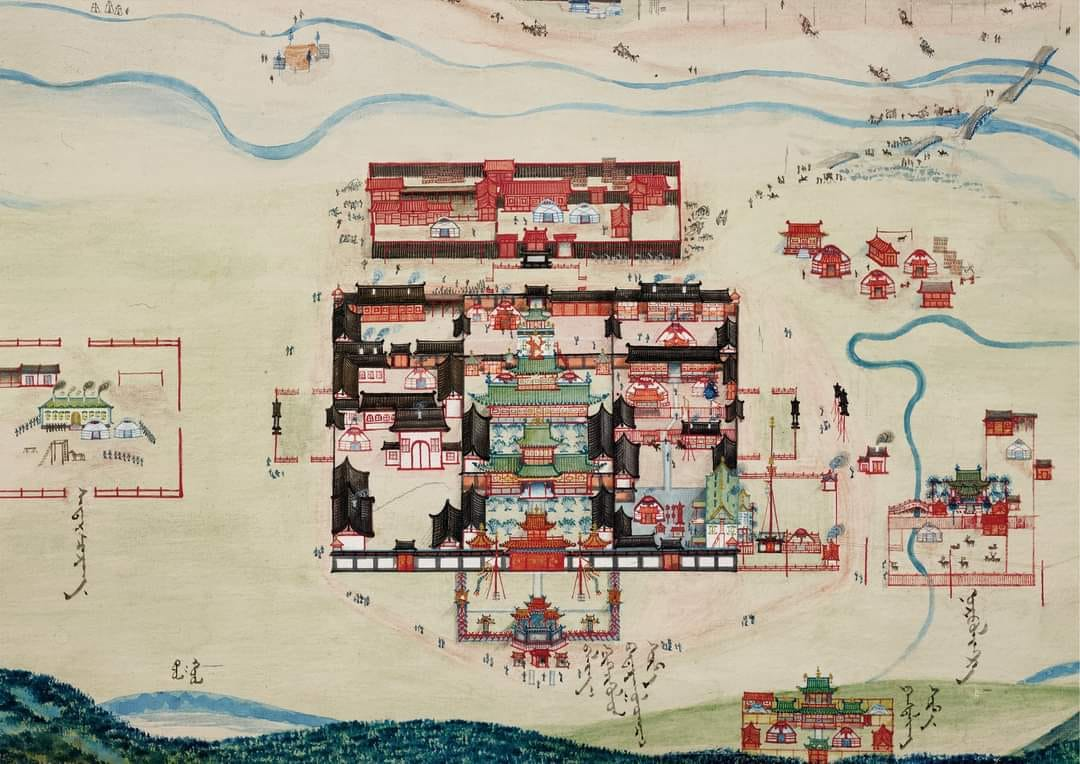
Aerial view of the palace, painting by Jugder (1913)

Built between 1893 and 1903, the complex consisted of the main gate to the south and a fenced courtyard, a central court with the main audience hall and temple, and two side courts on either east and west. Across the street to the north lay another complex. The last structure added was the Winter Palace in the eastern court, a two-storey white building as the modern residence for the Bogd Khan. It was constructed in 1905 and now houses the museum with items relating to the imperial Mongol court.

A large monumental painting of it was done by Marzan Sharav and housed in the Zanabazar Museum of Fine Arts.

The Green Palace is one of the few Mongolian historical attractions which has not been completely destroyed. However most structures on the eastern and western courtyard were lost, only the central court survived.

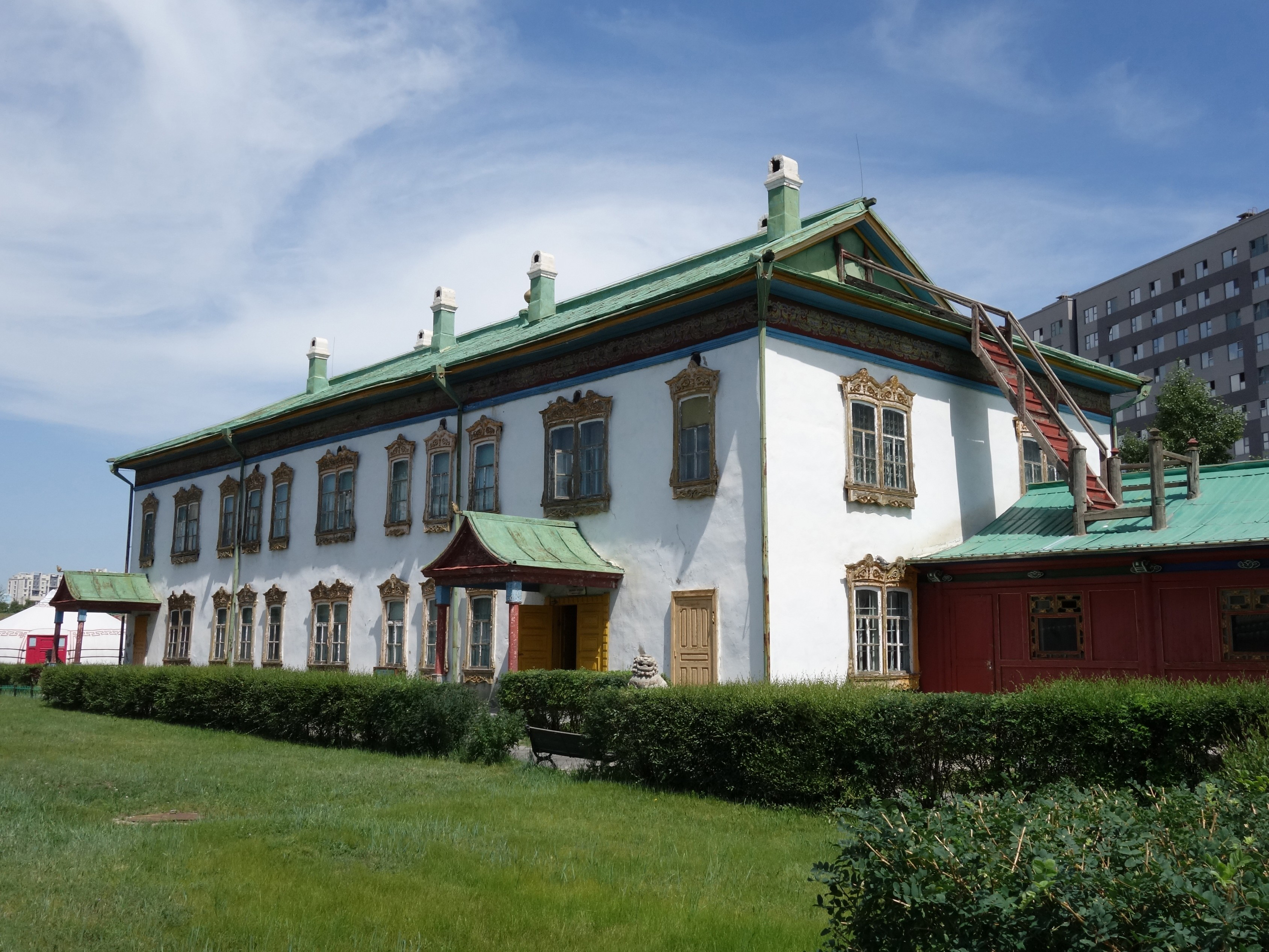
The Winter Palace

With the Winter Palace, the Gate of Peace and Happiness, the Cooling Pavilion as well as six temples, each containing Buddhist artwork, scripture and thangka, such as Naidan Temple and Makhranz Temple, the palace complex consists of a total of about 20 structures. The museum has about 8,600 exhibits and receives over 40,000 visitors annually. On display are many of the Bogd Khan's possessions, such as his throne and bed, his collection of art and stuffed animals, his ornate ceremonial ger, a pair of ceremonial boots given to the Khan by Russian Tsar Nicholas II, and also a jewelled regalia worn by the Bogd Khan's pet elephant. It currently runs its operations under the Ministry of Education, Culture, Science and Sports of Mongolia.

== Images ==
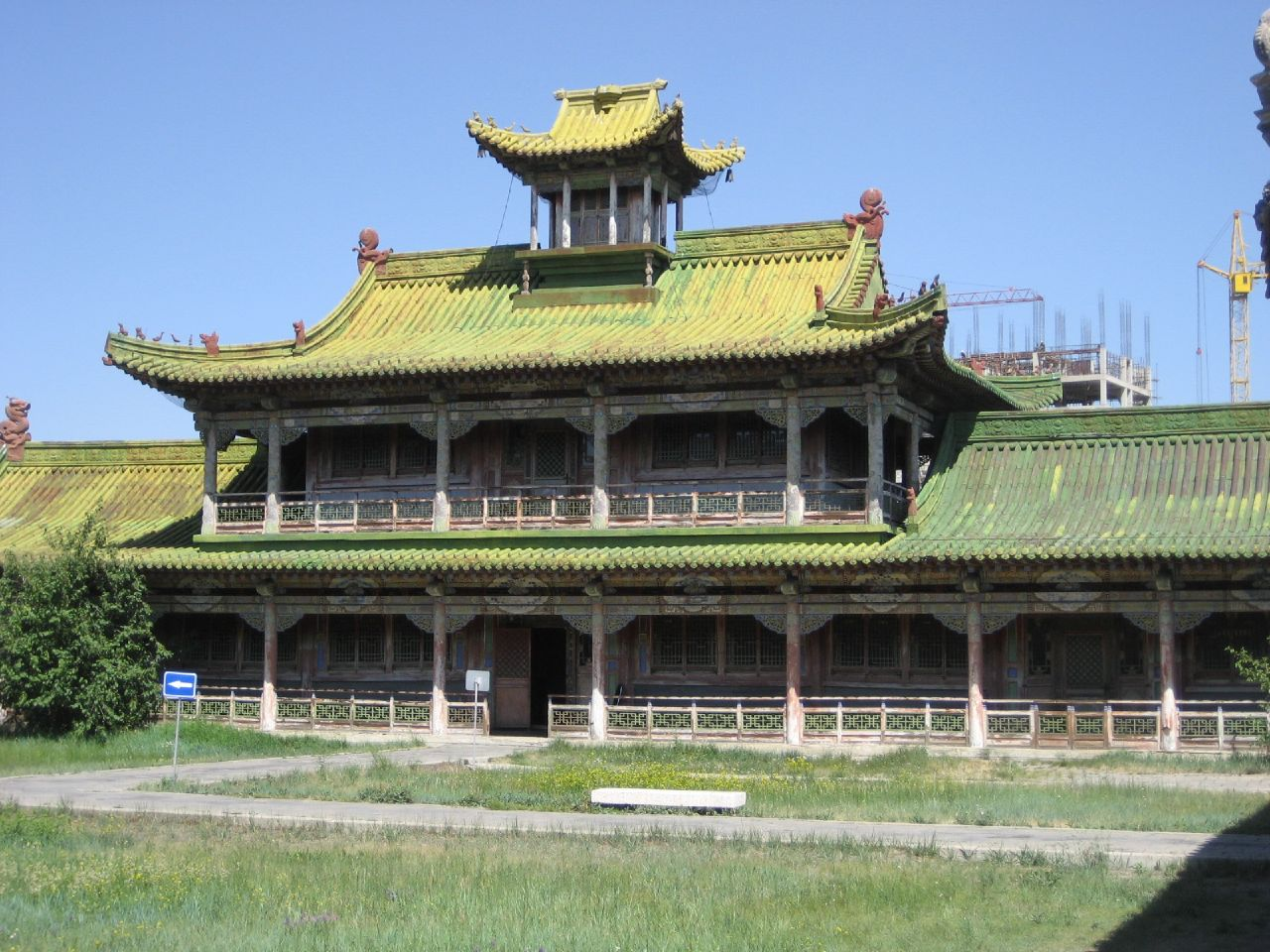
Main hall

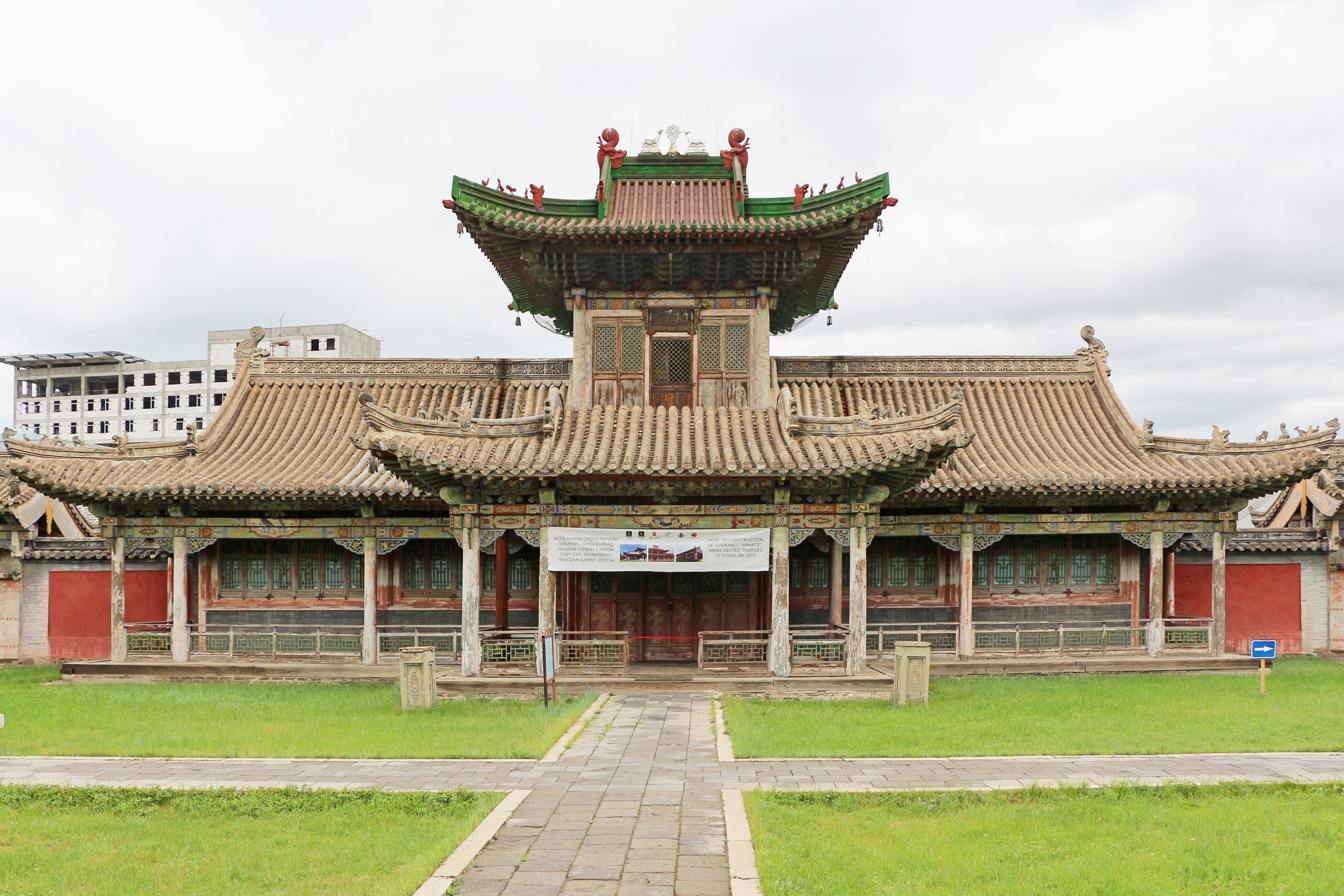
Naidan Temple

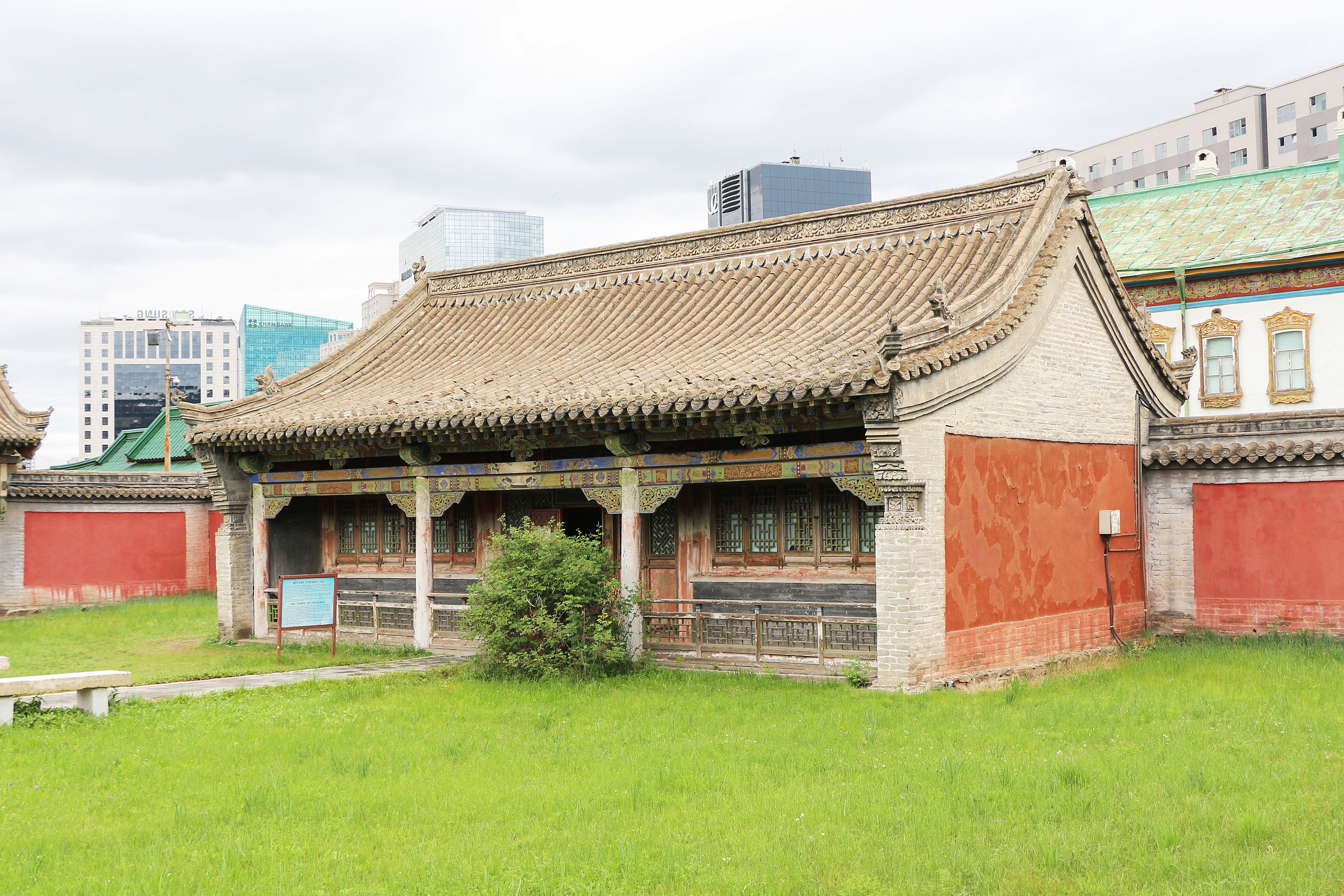
Temple of thangkas

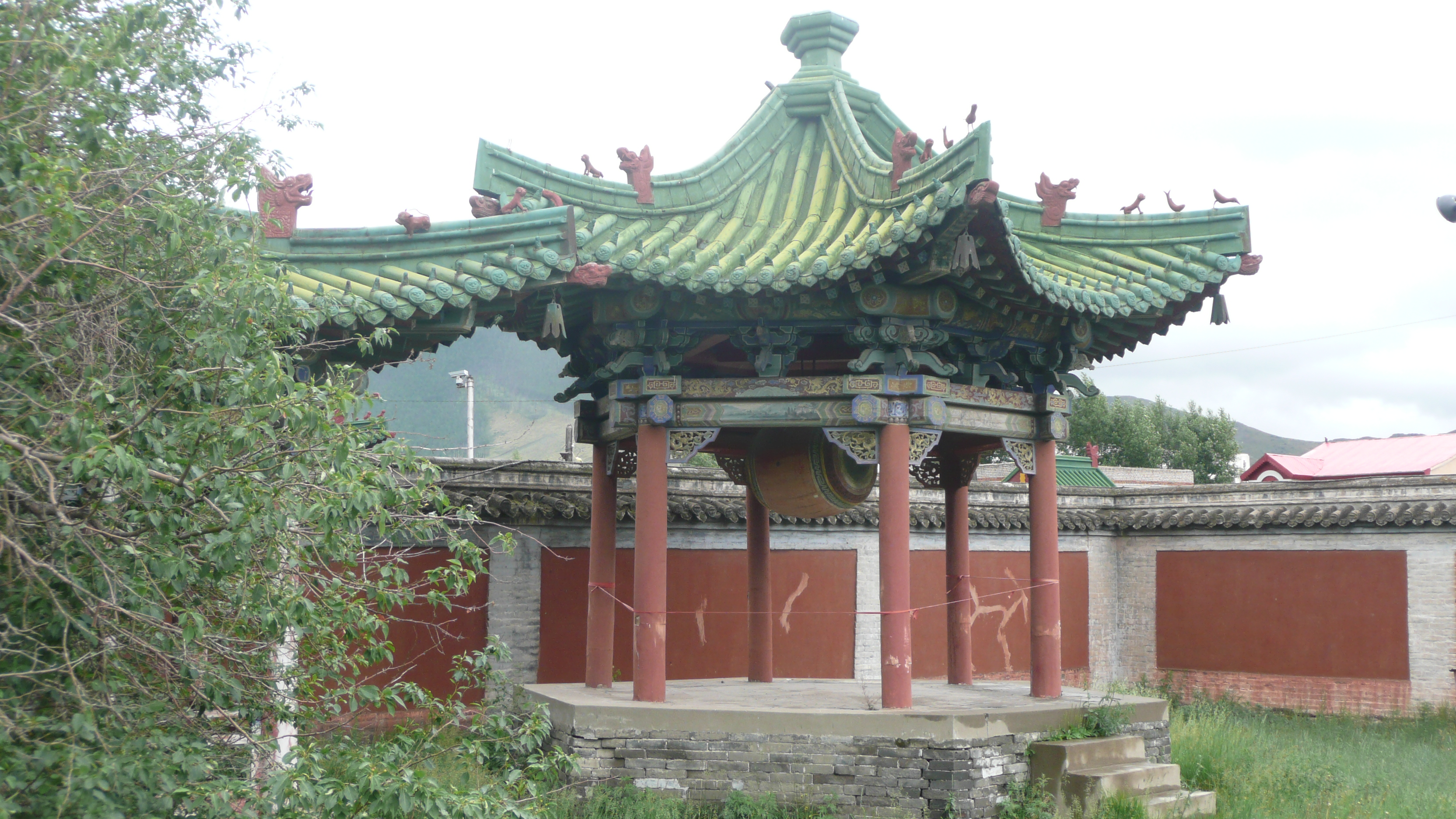
Pavillon

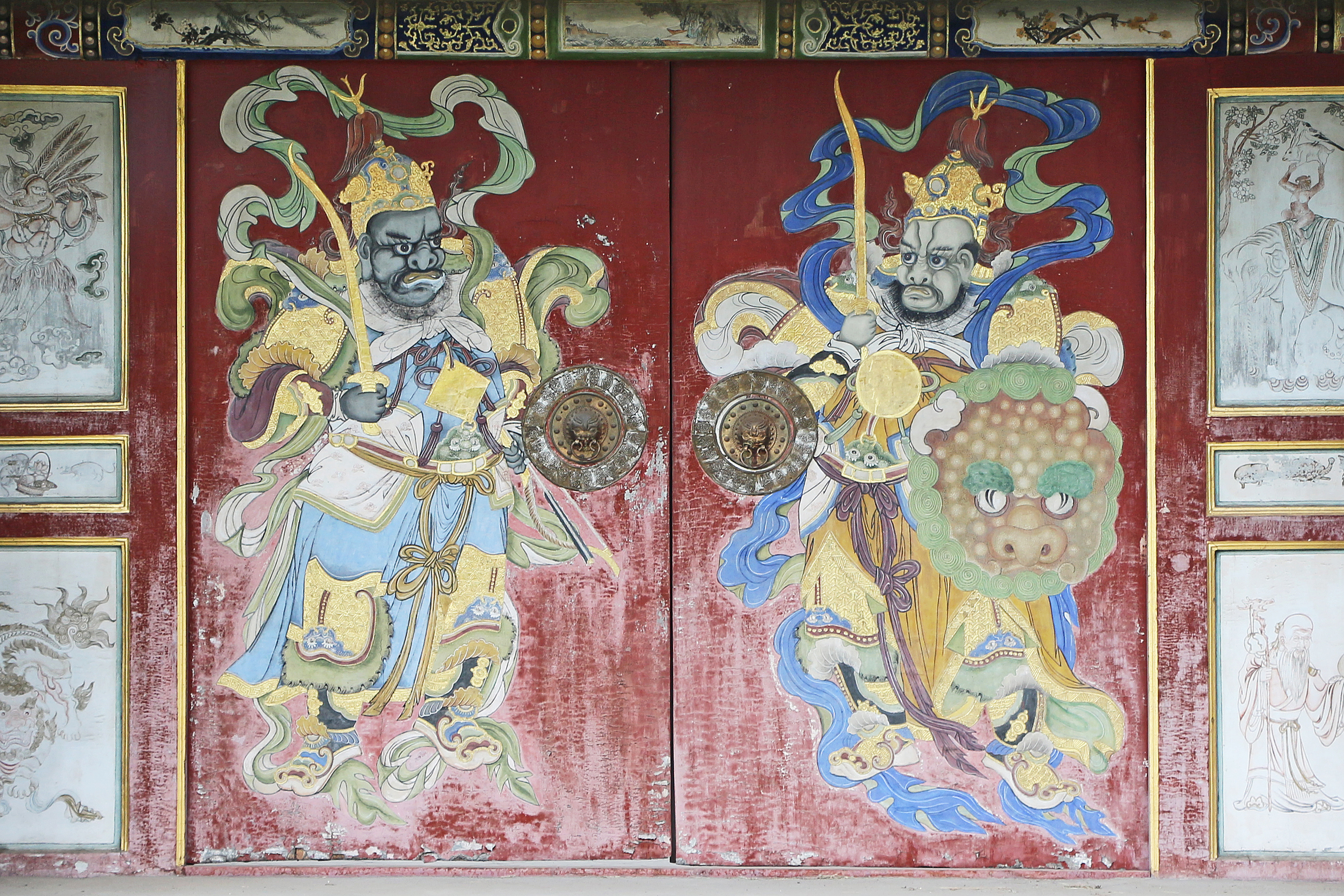
Doors of the main gate

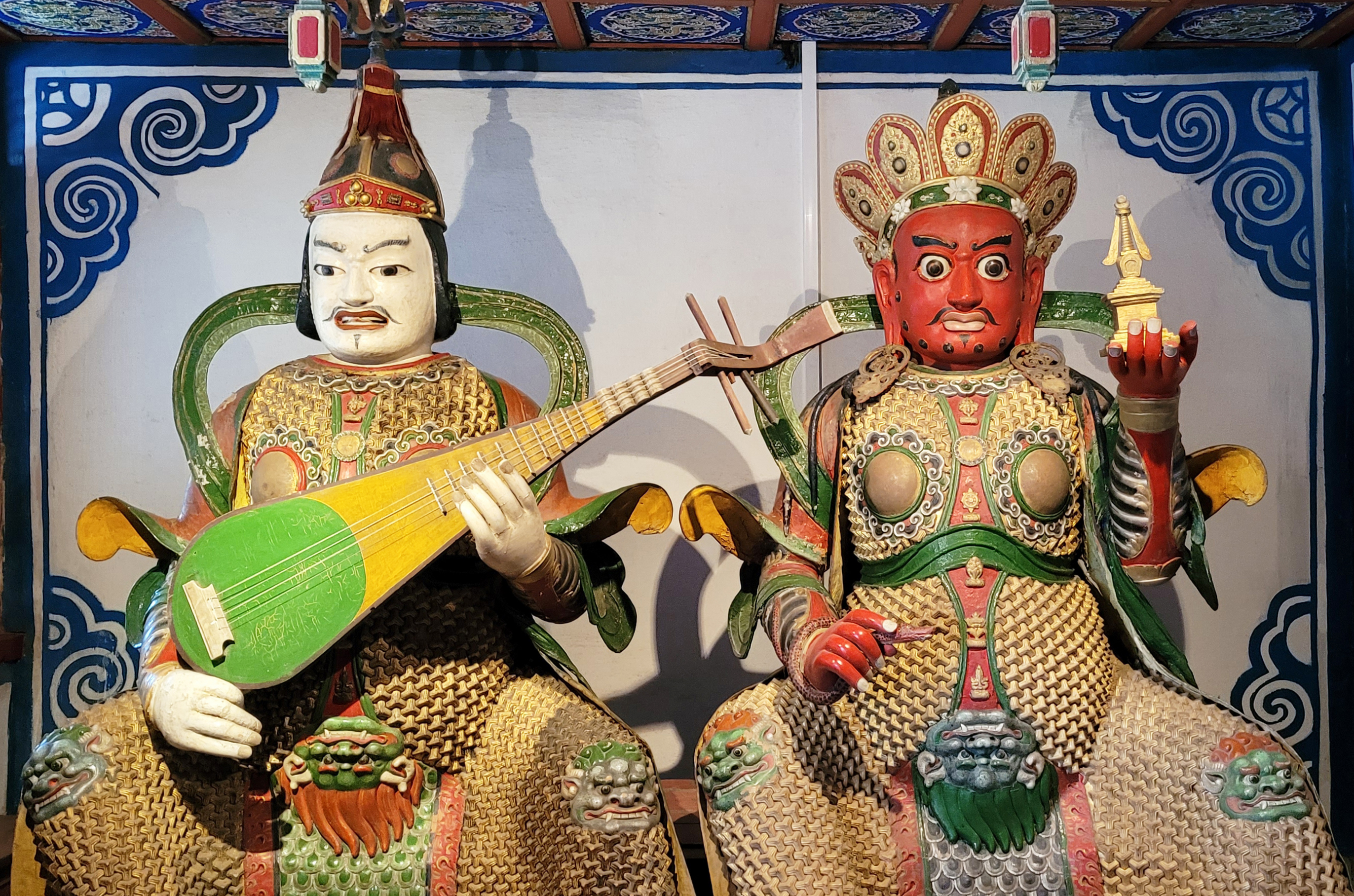
Two of the Four Heavenly Kings in the main gate

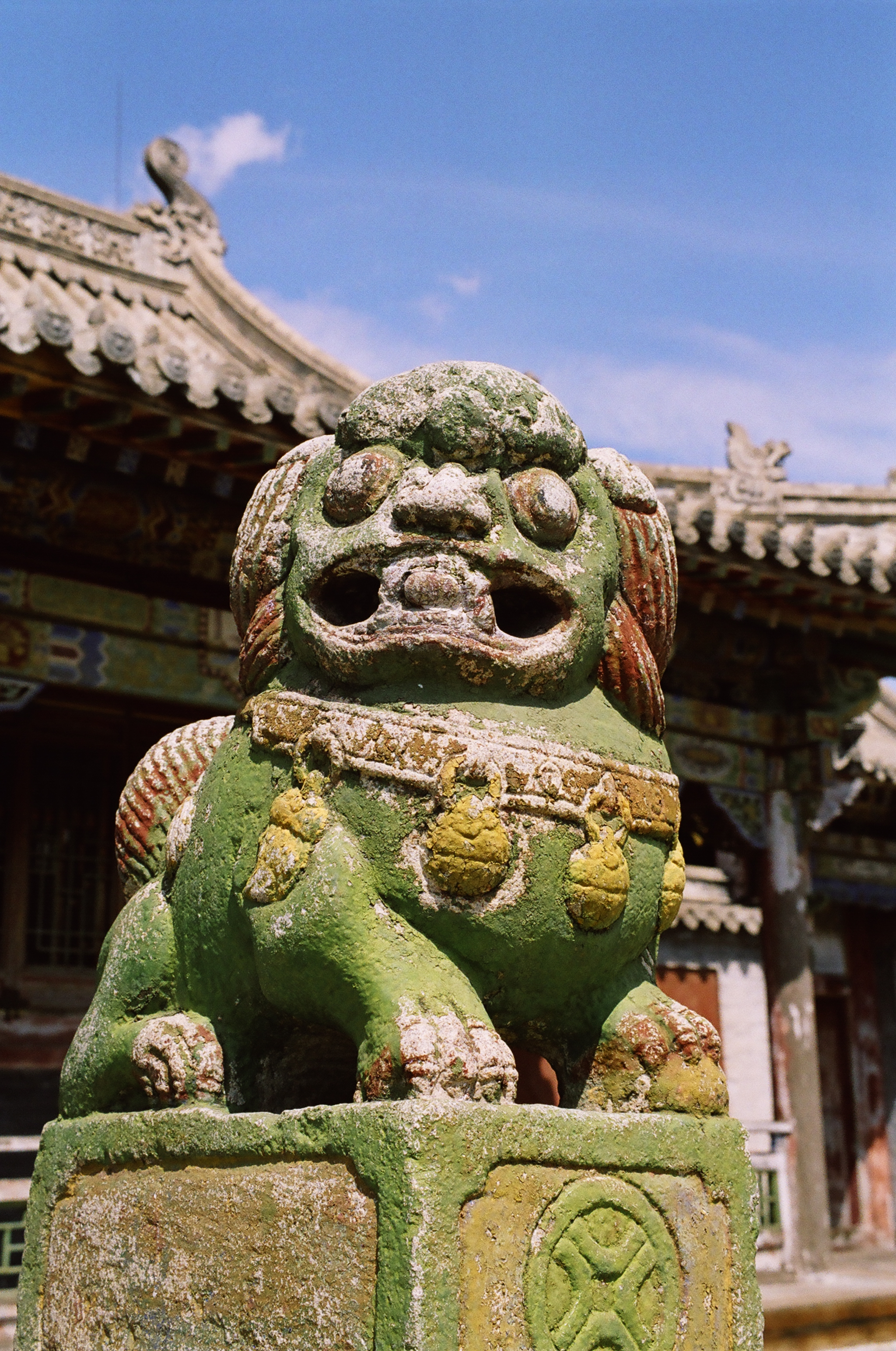
Guardian stone lion

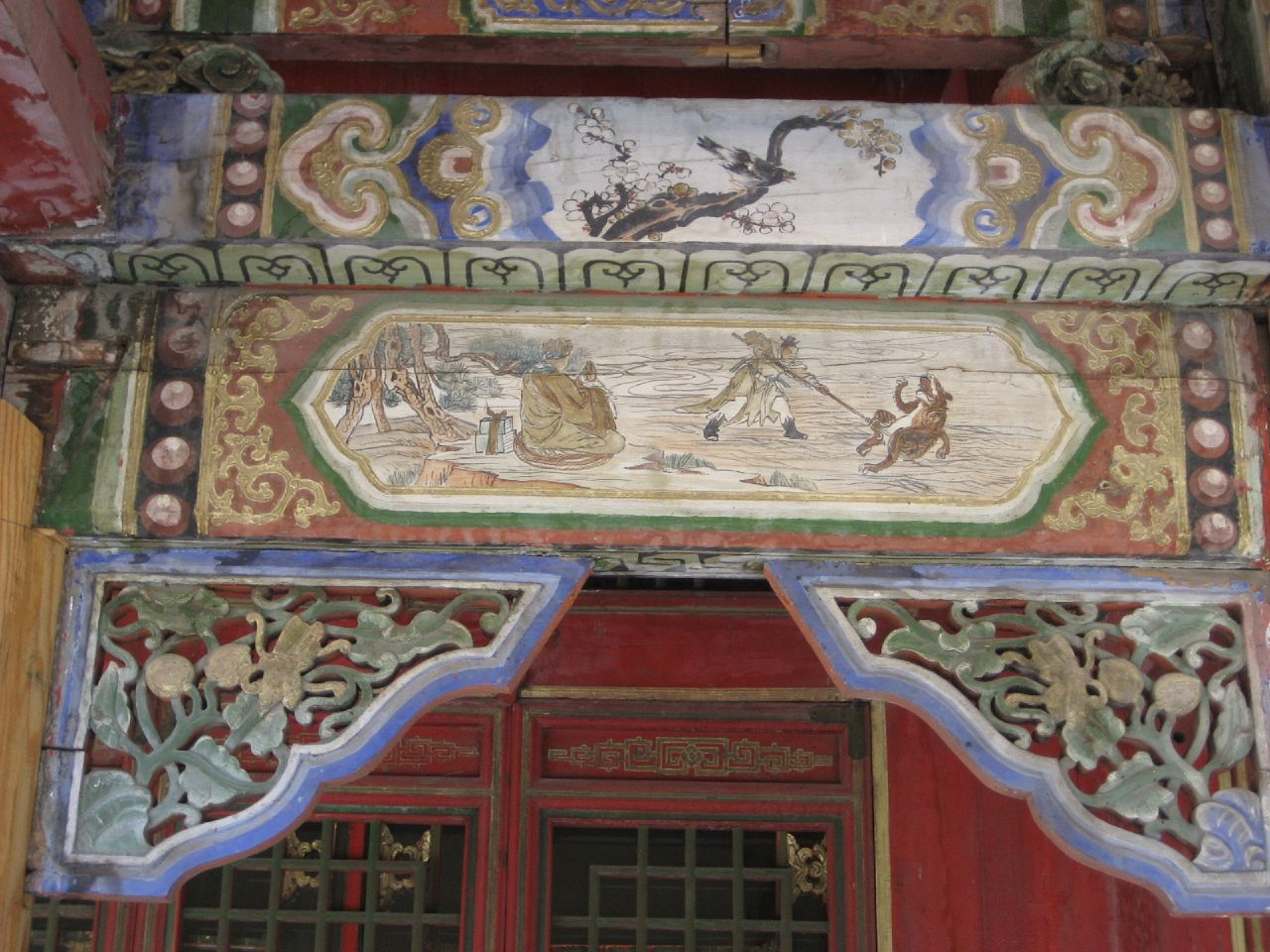
Detail of paintings in hall

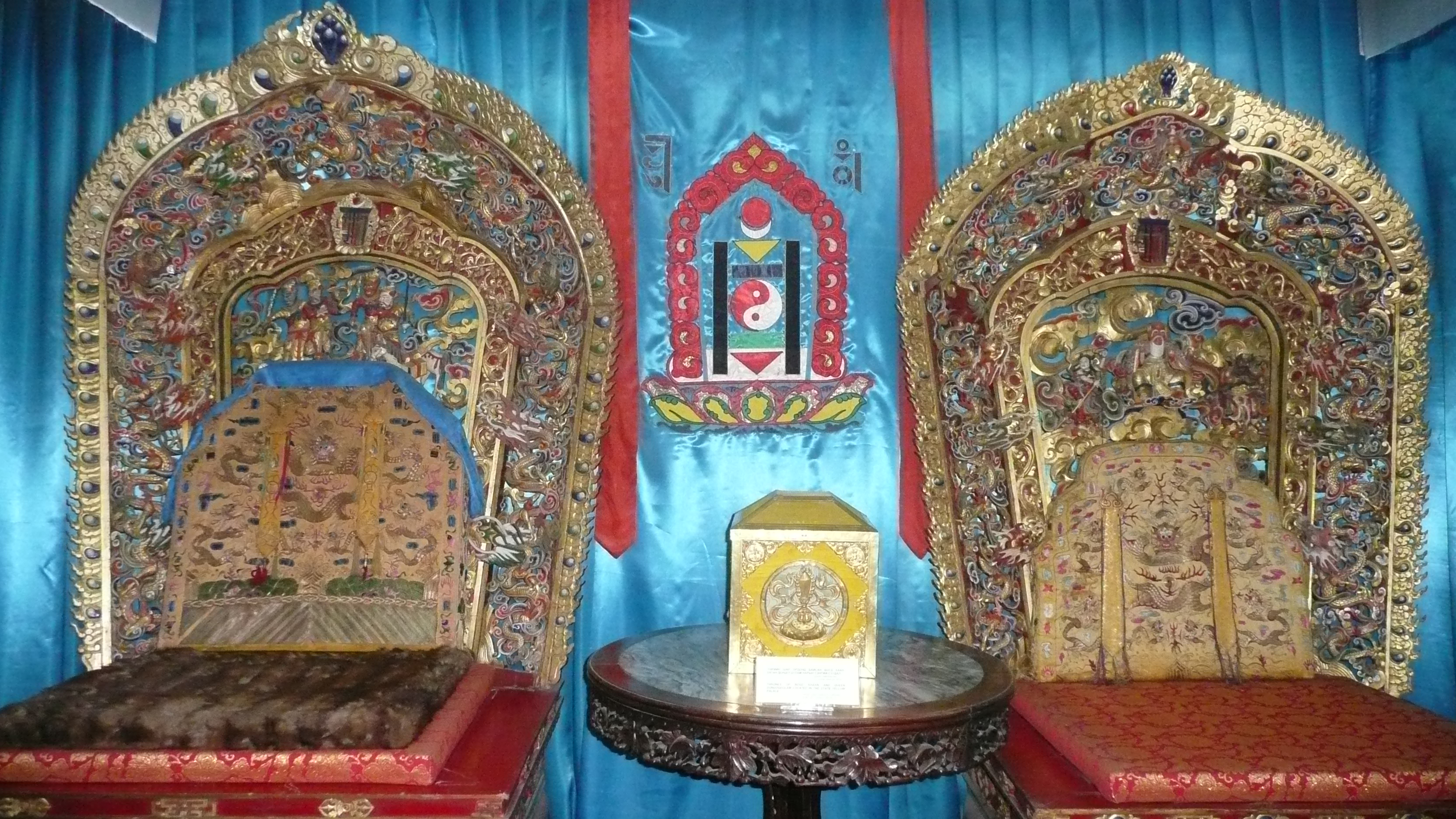
Throne of the Bogd Khan and the queen

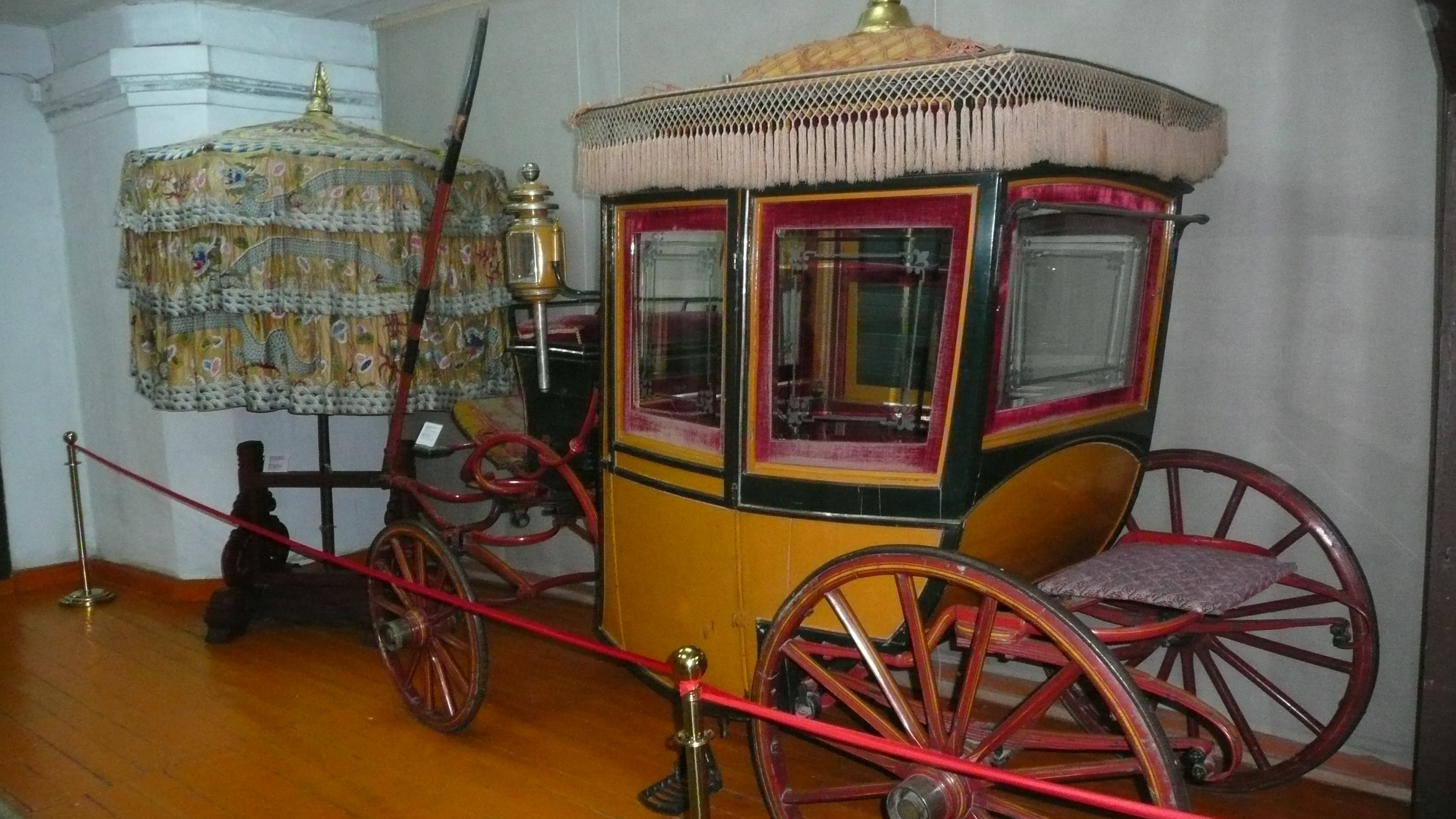
Royal Carriage and yellow state parasol

== See also ==
- Brown Palace
- Government Palace
- Karakorum
