= Ulaanbaatar Book Fair =

Book fair in Ulaanbaatar, Mongolia

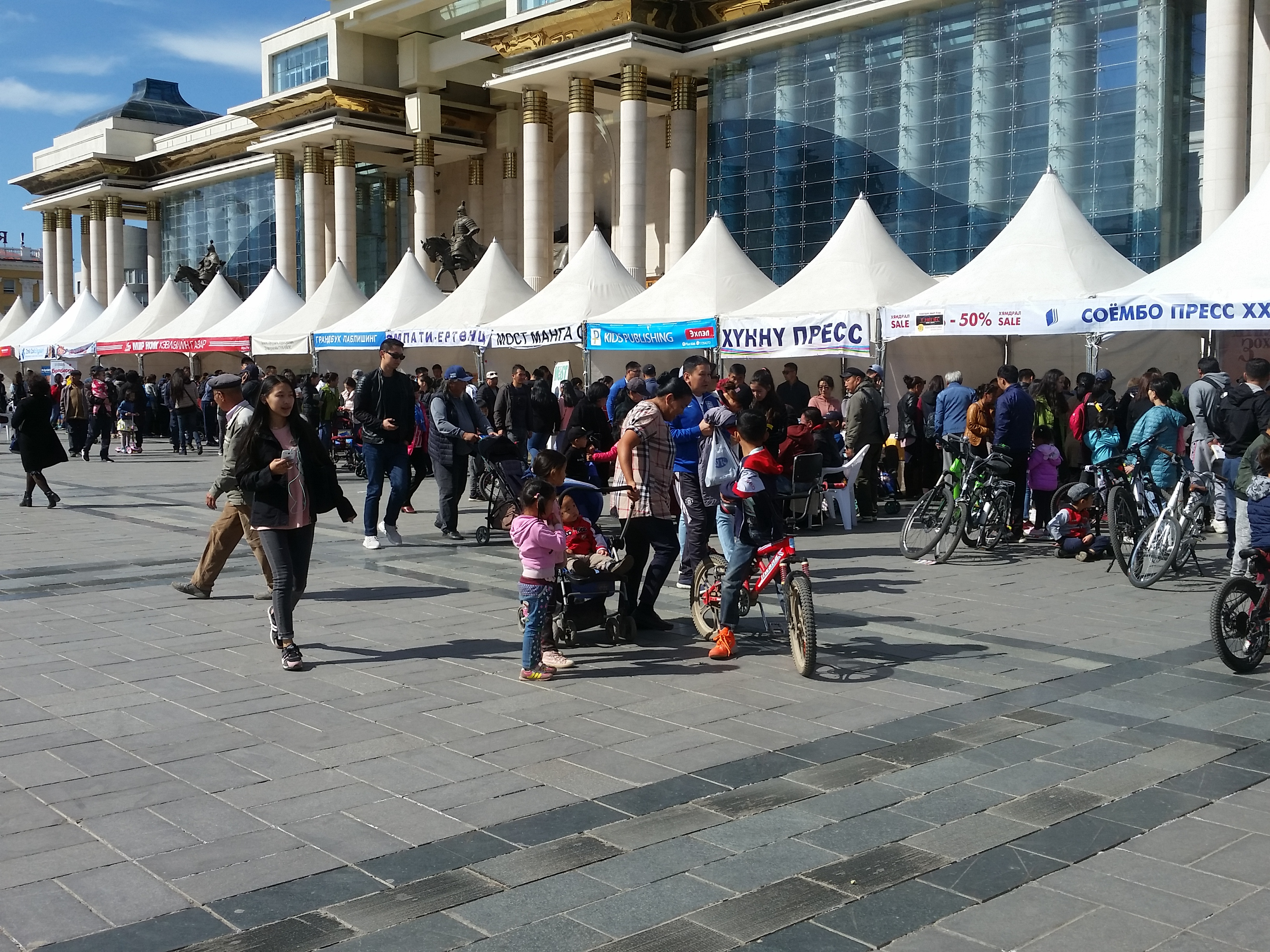
The Ulaanbaatar book fair main venue

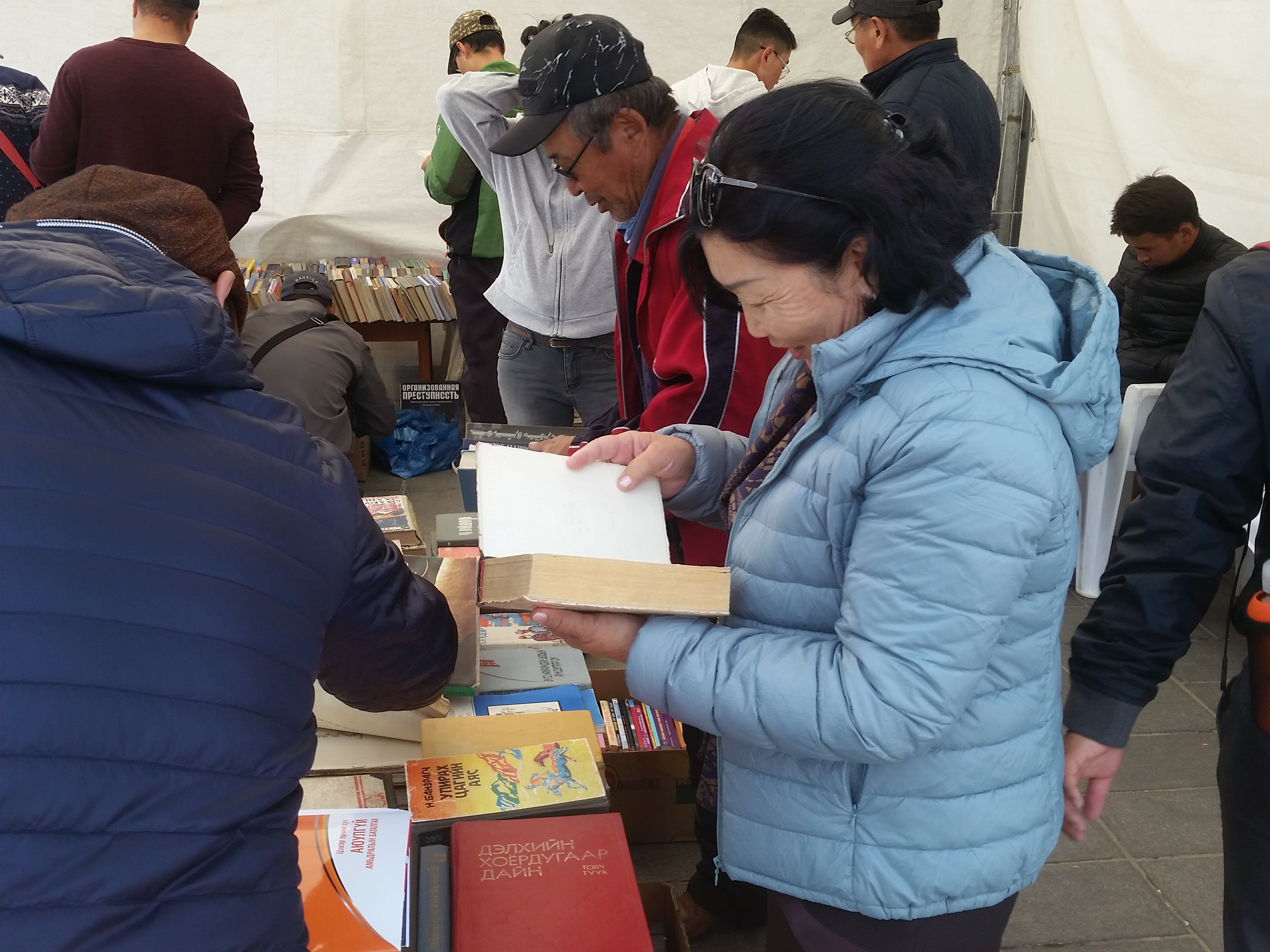
Readers checking books at the book fair

The Ulaanbaatar Book Fair (Mongolian: Улаанбаатарын номын баяр) is a book fair organized every year in May and September in Ulaanbaatar, Mongolia. More than 300 authors and more than 120 publishing houses and related organizations attend the event along with thousands of book readers. This event has been organized by the Nomiin Soyolt Ertonts, a non-government organization, since 2007. The fair introduces new books; authors give book talks and meet with attendees.
