= Cape Verde women's national football team results =

The Cape Verde women's national football team is the representative women's association football team of Cape Verde. Its governing body is the Cape Verdean Football Federation (FCF) and it competes as a member of the Confederation of African Football (CAF).

The national team's first activity was in 2018, when they played a friendly game against Guinea-Bissau in which they lost, goal to nil. Cape Verde is currently unranked in the FIFA Women's World Rankings. Czpe Verde is yet to participate in a major tournament, having only participated in 2020 WAFU Zone A Women's Cup finishing fourth.

== Record per opponent ==
Key

Positive balance (more wins than losses)
Neutral balance (as many wins as losses)
Negative balance (more losses than wins)

The following table shows Cape Verde' all-time official international record per opponent:

Opponent	Pld	W	D	L	GF	GA	GD	W%	Confederation
Gambia	1	1	0	0	2	1	+1	100.00	CAF
Guinea	3	2	1	0	9	3	+6	66.67	CAF
Guinea-Bissau	3	2	0	1	6	2	+4	66.67	CAF
Liberia	3	2	0	1	6	3	+3	66.67	CAF
Luxembourg	1	0	0	1	1	2	−1	00.00	UEFA
Mali	1	0	0	1	0	4	−4	00.00	CAF
Mauritania	1	1	0	0	6	0	+6	100.00	CAF
Nigeria	2	0	0	2	1	7	−6	00.00	CAF
Senegal	4	0	0	4	0	5	−5	00.00	CAF
Sierra Leone	1	0	1	0	0	0	0	00.00	CAF
Total	20	8	2	10	31	27	+4	40.00	—

== Results ==
=== 2018 ===
16 November 2018 Friendly	Cape Verde	0–1	Guinea-Bissau	Praia, Cape Verde
--:-- UTC+0				Stadium: National Stadium

=== 2019 ===
11 May 2019 Friendly	Guinea-Bissau	1–2	Cape Verde	Bissau, Guinea-Bissau
--:-- UTC+0			Silva ?'; Semedo ?'	Stadium: Estádio Lino Correia

=== 2020 ===
25 February 2020 2020 WAFU Zone A Women's Cup GS	Sierra Leone	0–0	Cape Verde	Bo, Sierra Leone
14:00 UTC+0				Stadium: Bo Stadium

26 February 2020 2020 WAFU Zone A Women's Cup GS	Cape Verde	0–2	Senegal	Bo, Sierra Leone
14:00 UTC+0			Sow 36'; Diop 67'	Stadium: Bo Stadium

1 March 2020 2020 WAFU Zone A Women's Cup GS	Cape Verde	3–0	Guinea	Makeni, Sierra Leone
16:00 UTC+0	Lopes 2', 72', 78'			Stadium: Wusum Sports Stadium

4 March 2020 2020 WAFU Zone A Women's Cup SF	Mali	4–0	Cape Verde	Makeni, Sierra Leone
16:00 UTC+0	A. Diarra 31', 41'; Sidibe 56', 87'	Report		Stadium: Wusum Sports Stadium

4 March 2020 2020 WAFU Zone A Women's Cup 3rd place	Liberia	1–0	Cape Verde	Makeni, Sierra Leone
16:00 UTC+0	Kieh 59'			Stadium: Wusum Sports Stadium

=== 2021 ===
15 September 2021 Friendly	Senegal	1–0	Cape Verde	Toubab Dialaw, Senegal
	Niang 15'	Report		Stadium: centre technique jules françois bocandé

18 September 2021 Friendly	Senegal	1–0	Cape Verde	Toubab Dialaw, Senegal
	Sow 63'	Report		Stadium: centre technique jules françois bocandé

=== 2022 ===
19 June 2022 International Friendly	Luxembourg	2–1	Cape Verde	Bettembourg, Luxembourg
19:15	Dos Santos 8'; Jorge 15'	Report (FLF) Report (FLF IG)	Pereira 7'	Stadium: Stade Municipal; Attendance: 880; Referee: Viki De Cremer (Belgium)

=== 2023 ===
20 January 2023 2023 WAFU Zone A Women's Cup GS	Cape Verde	4–0	Guinea-Bissau	Sal, Cape Verde
16:00	Moreira 10', 45'; Fernandes 20'; Whannon 55'	Report (FCF)		Stadium: Estádio Marcelo Leitão

24 January 2023 2023 WAFU Zone A Women's Cup GS	Mauritania	0–6	Cape Verde	Sal, Cape Verde
16:00		Report (FCF)	Moreira 7' (pen.), 17', 28', 62', 71'; Borges 59'	Stadium: Estádio Marcelo Leitão; Referee: Ngum Fatou (Gambia)

27 January 2023 2023 WAFU Zone A Women's Cup SF	Cape Verde	2–1	Gambia	Sal, Cape Verde
15:00	da Luz 14'; Tavares Cardoso 82'	Report (FCF)	Jatta 66'	Stadium: Estádio Marcelo Leitão

29 January 2023 2023 WAFU Zone A Women's Cup Final	Cape Verde	0–1	Senegal	Sal, Cape Verde
18:00		Report (FCF)	Fall 60' (pen.)	Stadium: Estádio Marcelo Leitão; Referee: Sylvina Garnett (Liberia)

22 September 2023 2024 AFWCON qualification First round 1st leg	Cape Verde	3–0	Liberia	Praia, Cape Verde
16:00 UTC−1	Moreira 15', 90+5'; Pereira 53'	Report (FCF)		Stadium: Estádio Nacional de Cabo Verde

26 September 2023 2024 AFWCON qualification First round 2nd leg	Liberia	2–3 (2–6 agg.)	Cape Verde	Monrovia, Liberia
15:30 UTC+0	Agbotsu 13'; Kpan 70' (pen.)	Report (FCF)	Pereira 10'; Santos 23'; Borges 38'	Stadium: Samuel Kanyon Doe Sports Complex
Note: Cape Verde won 6–2 on aggregate.

30 November 2023 2024 AFWCON qualification Second round 1st leg	Nigeria	5–0	Cape Verde	Lagos, Nigeria
16:00 UTC+1	Kanu 7', 45+1'; Monday 25'; Okoronkwo 66', 77'	Report (NFF)		Stadium: Onikan Stadium

5 December 2023 2024 AFWCON qualification Second round 2nd leg	Cape Verde	1–2 (1–7 agg.)	Nigeria
Note: Nigeria won 7–1 on aggregate.

=== 2025 ===
21 February 2025 2026 WAFCON qualifying	Guinea	2–2	Cape Verde	Thiès, Senegal
15:30 UTC+0	A. Camara 62'; Moreira 90+5' (o.g.)	Report	Fortes 42'; da Luz 45+1'	Stadium: Stade Lat-Dior; Referee: Ghada Mehat (Algeria)

26 February 2025 2026 WAFCON qualifying	Cape Verde	4–1 (6–3 agg.)	Guinea	Praia, Cape Verde
16:00 UTC−1	Moreira 11'; Pereira 22', 28'; da Luz 87'	Report	Mar. Camara 30'	Stadium: Estádio Nacional de Cabo Verde
Note: Cape Verde won 6–3 on aggregate.

15 June 2025 International Friendly	Morocco	1–0	Cape Verde	Rabat, Morocco
17:00 UTC−1	Jraïdi 66'			Stadium: Prince Moulay Abdellah Stadium

24 October 2025 2026 WAFCON qualifying	Cape Verde	0–1	Mali	Praia
15:00 UTC−1		Report (FIFA)	C. Dembele 81'	Stadium: Estádio Nacional de Cabo Verde; Referee: Aicha Bit Oumarou (Chad)

28 October 2025 2026 WAFCON qualifying	Mali	2–4	Cape Verde	Bamako
17:00 UTC+0	Kone 55', 88'	Report; Report (FIFA)	Melo 14'; Moreira 17'; Vieira 24'; Pereira 72'	Stadium: Stade du 26 Mars; Referee: Kindédji Edoh (Togo)
Note: Cape Verde won 4–3 on aggregate.'

Source :globalsportsarchive

== See also ==
- Cape Verde national football team results
