= Guinea-Bissau women's national football team results =

The Guinea-Bissau women's national football team is the representative women's association football team of Guinea-Bissau. Its governing body is the Football Federation of Guinea-Bissau (FFGB) and it competes as a member of the Confederation of African Football (CAF).

The national team's first activity was in 2006, when they played a friendly game against Guinea. Guinea-Bissau is currently ranked 169th in the FIFA Women's World Rankings.

== Record per opponent ==
Key

Positive balance (more wins than losses)
Neutral balance (as many wins as losses)
Negative balance (more losses than wins)

The following table shows Guinea-Bissau' all-time official international record per opponent:

Opponent	Pld	W	D	L	GF	GA	GD	W%	Confederation
Burkina Faso	2	0	0	2	0	7	−7	0.00	CAF
Cape Verde	2	1	0	1	2	2	0	50.00	CAF
Gambia	5	0	2	3	5	13	−8	0.00	CAF
Guinea	2	0	1	1	2	4	−2	0.00	CAF
Liberia	1	0	0	1	0	4	−4	0.00	CAF
Mali	1	0	0	1	0	2	−2	0.00	CAF
Mauritania	2	2	0	0	2	0	+2	100.00	CAF
Senegal	1	0	0	1	0	3	−3	0.00	CAF
Total	16	3	3	10	11	35	−24	18.75	—

== Results ==
=== 2006 ===
28 October 2006 Friendly	Guinea-Bissau	1–1	Guinea	Bissau, Guinea-Bissau
--:-- UTC+0

12 November 2006 Friendly	Guinea	3–1	Guinea-Bissau	Conakry, Guinea
--:-- UTC+0

=== 2017 ===
16 September 2017 Friendly	Gambia	2–0	Guinea-Bissau	Bakau, Gambia
--:-- UTC+0

=== 2018 ===
26 February 2018 Friendly	Guinea-Bissau	1–4	Gambia	Bissau, Guinea-Bissau
--:-- UTC+0

16 November 2018 Friendly	Cape Verde	0–1	Guinea-Bissau	Praia, Cape Verde
--:-- UTC+0

=== 2019 ===
11 May 2019 Friendly	Guinea-Bissau	1–2	Cape Verde	Bissau, Guinea-Bissau
--:-- UTC+0

16 June 2019 Friendly	Gambia	1–1	Guinea-Bissau	Bakau, Gambia
--:-- UTC+0

18 June 2019 Friendly	Gambia	1–1	Guinea-Bissau	Bakau, Gambia
--:-- UTC+0

=== 2020 ===
26 February 2020 2020 WAFU Zone A Women's Cup Group B	Liberia	4–0	Guinea-Bissau	Makeni, Sierra Leone
16:30 UTC+0	Massaquio 13'; Willie 43'; Kieh 45+1' (pen.); Kikeh 72'			Stadium: Wusum Sports Stadium

28 February 2020 2020 WAFU Zone A Women's Cup Group B	Gambia	5–2	Guinea-Bissau	Makeni, Sierra Leone
16:30 UTC+0	Tamba 7', 48', 66', 77'; Buwuro 88'		Mane 4'; Te 44'	Stadium: Wusum Sports Stadium

2 March 2020 2020 WAFU Zone A Women's Cup Group B	Guinea-Bissau	0–2	Mali	Bo, Sierra Leone
16:00 UTC+0			Sidibe 60'; A. Diarra 90+'	Stadium: Bo

=== 2021 ===
20 October 2021 2022 AFWCON qualification first round 1st leg	Guinea-Bissau	1–0	Mauritania	Bissau, Guinea-Bissau
20:00 UTC+0	Mané 73'	Report		Stadium: Estádio 24 de Setembro; Referee: Sylvina Garnett (Liberia)

26 October 2021 2022 AFWCON qualification first round 2nd leg	Mauritania	0–1 (0–2 agg.)	Guinea-Bissau	Nouakchott, Mauritania
20:00 UTC+0	Mané 73'	Report		Stadium: Stade Olympique; Referee: [[Félicité Kourouma (Guinea)]]
Note: Guinea-Bissau won 2–0 on aggregate.

=== 2022 ===
16 February 2022 AFWCON qualification Second round 1st leg	Guinea-Bissau	0–6	Burkina Faso	Bissau, Guinea-Bissau
		Report		Stadium: Estádio 24 de Setembro; Referee: Zomadre Sonia Lire (Ivory Coast)

23 February 2022 AFWCON qualification Second round 2nd leg	Burkina Faso	1–0 (7–0 agg.)	Guinea-Bissau	Porto-Novo (Benin)
		Report		Stadium: Stade Charles de Gaulle; Referee: Patience Madu (Nigeria)
Note: Burkina Faso won 7–0 on aggregate.

23 June Friendly	Senegal	3–0	Guinea-Bissau	Thiès, Senegal
	Ndiaye ??'; Fall ??'; Diakhaté ??'	Report		Stadium: Stade Lat Dior

=== 2023 ===
20 January 2023 2023 WAFU Zone A Women's Cup GS	Cape Verde	4–0	Guinea-Bissau	Sal, Cape Verde
16:00	Moreira 10', 45'; Fernandes 20'; Whannon 55'	Report (FCF); Report (CAF)		Stadium: Estádio Marcelo Leitão

22 January 2023 2023 WAFU Zone A Women's Cup GS	Guinea-Bissau	1–0	Mauritania	Sal, Cape Verde
16:00	Paulo Mendes 55'	Report (FCF)		Stadium: Estádio Marcelo Leitão

27 January 2023 2023 WAFU Zone A Women's Cup SF	Senegal	4–0	Guinea-Bissau	Sal, Cape Verde
18:00	Ndiaye 13'; Diallo 51' (pen.), 68'; Fall 82'	Report (FCF)		Stadium: Estádio Marcelo Leitão; Referee: Aissata Diarra (Mali)

29 January 2023 2023 WAFU Zone A Women's Cup 3rd place	Gambia	3–2	Guinea-Bissau	Sal, Cape Verde
15:00	Buwaro 28', 37'; Jarju 90+1'		Da Silva 50'; Mendes 90+5'	Stadium: Estádio Marcelo Leitão

14 July 2023 2024 Olympic qualifying	Guinea-Bissau	2–2	Benin	Bissau, Guinea-Bissau
	Quade 45'; Soares 60'		Gnammi 14'; Gbedjissi 76'	Stadium: Estádio 24 de Setembro

18 July 2023 2024 Olympic qualifying	Benin	3–2 (5–4 agg.)	Guinea-Bissau	Cotonou, Benin
				Stadium: Stade de l'Amitié
Note: Benin won 5–4 on aggregate.

21 September 2023 2024 AFWCON qualification First round 1st leg	Guinea-Bissau	0–1	Congo	Bissau, Guinea-Bissau
--:-- UTC+0		Report	Indira 89' (o.g.)	Stadium: Estádio 24 de Setembro

26 September 2023 2024 AFWCON qualification First round 2nd leg	Congo	2–0 (3–0 agg.)	Guinea-Bissau	Brazzaville, Congo
15:30 UTC+1	Senga 58'; Dembélé 78'			Stadium: Stade Alphonse Massemba-Débat
Note: Congo won 3–0 on aggregate.

== See also ==
- Guinea-Bissau national football team results
