= Melany Fortes =

Cape Verdean footballer (born 2000)

Personal information
- Full name: Melany Maria Monteiro Fortes
- Date of birth: 12 May 2000 (age 26)
- Place of birth: Cape Verde
- Position: Forward

Team information
- Current team: S.C. Braga
- Number: 13

Senior career*
| Years | Team | Apps | (Gls) |
| –2021 | Llana FC | | |
| 2021–2022 | C.F. Benfica | 37 | (27) |
| 2022–2024 | S.F. Damaiense | 50 | (8) |
| 2024– | S.C. Braga | 11 | (2) |

International career^{‡}
| 2020– | Cape Verde | 6 | (2) |
- * Club domestic league appearances and goals ‡ National team caps and goals as of 22 February 2025

Melany Maria Monteiro Fortes (Portuguese: [me.lɐ.ˈni mɐˈɾi.ɐ mõ.ˈtej.ɾu ˈfɔɾ.tɨʃ], born 12 May 2000), nicknamed Melatcha (Kabuverdianu: [me.ˈla.ʧɐ]), is a Cape Verdean professional footballer who plays as a forward for Campeonato Nacional Feminino club S.C. Braga and the Cape Verde national football team.

== Club career ==
In Cape Verde, the young Criolo talent played for Llana FC, where she earned multiple individual accolades, including Cape Verde's Young Prospect at the Cabo Verdean Sports Gala, Best Breakthrough Athlete at the Gala Sal Campeão, Top Scorer, Young Breakthrough Player of the National League for the 2018–19 season, and Top Scorer of the Taça Dja D'Sal 2018–19.

In February 2021, Melany moved to Portugal where she joined the Lisbon-based club C.F. Benfica. She played a key role in the club's promotion to the Campeonato Nacional Feminino, scoring the decisive goal that secured Benfica's ascent.

On 27 June 2024, Melatcha announced her departure from S.F. Damaiense after two seasons with the club, during which she was one of the team's key players, tallying eight goals and three assists in 50 matches.

In July 2024, S.C. Braga announced the signing of Fortes. On 29 September 2024, She scored her first goal for the club in a 4–1 win over Torreense.

== International career ==
Melany first represented Cape Verde in beach soccer, playing as a goalkeeper for the national team in the 2019 African Beach Games held in Sal, where they won gold, and in the 2019 World Beach Games.

In February 2020, Fortes was called up to the senior national football team to compete in the 2020 WAFU Zone A Women's Cup held in Sierra Leone. On 1 March 2020, she made her debut for the Crioulos Feminino against Guinea, coming on as a substitute for Irlanda Lopes. On 5 December 2023, She scored her first goal for the country against Nigeria in a 1–2 loss.

== Career statistics ==
=== International ===
As of match played 26 February 2025

Appearances and goals by national team and year
| National team | Year | Apps | Goals |
|---|---|---|---|
| Cape Verde | 2020 | 2 | 0 |
| Cape Verde | 2023 | 3 | 1 |
| Cape Verde | 2025 | 2 | 1 |
| Total | | 7 | 2 |

Scores and results list Cape Verde's goal tally first, score column indicates score after each Fortes goal.

List of international goals scored by Melany Fortes
| No. | Date | Venue | Opponent | Score | Result | Competition |
|---|---|---|---|---|---|---|
| 1 | 5 December 2023 | Estádio Nacional de Cabo Verde, Praia, Cape Verde | Nigeria | 1–0 | 1–2 | 2024 WAFCON qualifiers |
| 2 | 21 February 2025 | Stade Lat-Dior, Thiès, Senegal | Guinea | 1–0 | 2–2 | 2026 WAFCON qualifiers |
