= Adriana Semedo =

Cape Verdean footballer (born 1999)

Personal information
- Full name: Adriana Filipa Vieira Semedo
- Date of birth: 30 October 1999 (age 26)
- Place of birth: Mozelos, Santa Maria da Feira, Portugal
- Height: 1.68 m (5 ft 6 in)
- Position: Forward

Team information
- Current team: Al Ahli
- Number: 18

Youth career
- 2016–2017: Relâmpago UFC Nogueirense
- 2017–2018: Ja Rio Meão

Senior career*
Years	Team	Apps	(Gls)
2018–2019	Boavista	19	(2)
2019–2021	Fiães	31	(19)
2021–2022	Racing Power	14	(3)
2022–2023	Gil Vicente	22	(5)
2023	Zaragoza CFF		
2023–2024	Gil Vicente	10	(1)
2024–2026	Porto	14	(4)
2026–	Al Ahli	2	(0)

International career
2023–	Cabo Verde		(0)
- * Club domestic league appearances and goals as of 11 September 2026

Adriana Filipa Vieira Semedo, commonly known as Adriana Semedo and nicknamed Dri (born 30 October 1999) is a professional footballer who plays as a forward for Saudi Women's Premier League (SWPL) club Al Ahli Club. Born in Portugal she represents the Cabo Verdean national team.

== Club career ==
On 15 August 2023, Zaragoza CFF announced the signing of Semedo, marking her first move abroad from Portugal.

In August 2024, FC Porto unveiled Semedo and five other new signings to strengthen the squad. On 22 September 2024, She scored her first goal for the club in a Taça de Portugal Feminina match against Académico.

In May 2025, Semedo renewed her contract with the club for another season. In July 2026, she announced her departure from the club.

== International career ==
Born in Portugal, Semedo is of Cape Verdean descent, making her eligible to represent either national team.

In September 2023, she received her first call-up to the Cape Verde women's national football team for the 2024 Women's Africa Cup of Nations qualification double-header against Liberia, making her international debut during the tie. On 8 February 2025, She became the first player of Porto to be called to a national team when she was included in Cabo Verde squad for the 2026 Women's Africa Cup of Nations qualification matches against Guinea.
