= 2026 Women's Africa Cup of Nations qualification =

Tournament details
- Dates: 19 February – 28 October 2025
- Teams: 36 (from 1 confederation)

Tournament statistics
- Matches played: 50
- Goals scored: 131 (2.62 per match)
- Top scorer(s): (Algeria) Ghoutia Karchouni (Burkina Faso) Adèle Kabré (Ghana) Doris Boaduwaa (Zambia) Racheal Kundananji (4 goals each)

The 2026 Women's Africa Cup of Nations qualification was a women's football competition to determine the teams joining the automatically qualified host Morocco in the 2026 Women's Africa Cup of Nations final tournament.

Though CAF planned for a final tournament of 12 teams, reports surfaced in early October 2025 that the final tournament would be expanded to 16 teams. CAF apparently refuted those reports on 25 October by clarifying that 11 teams would qualify, but announced on 3 November that the four teams defeated in the second round that were ranked highest in the FIFA Women's World Ranking of 7 August 2025 would also play in the final tournament.

== Format ==
The African qualifiers commenced in February 2025 and featured two rounds of competition. In the first round, the 32 teams ranked 7th and below played home-and-away two-legged ties. The 16 winners advanced to the second round, where they were joined by the six teams that received a bye. The winners of the 11 second round home-and-away ties qualified for the final tournament in Morocco. After the completion of the second round, CAF announced four additional teams had qualified based on their FIFA ranking.

== Schedule ==
Round	Dates
First round	19–26 February 2025
Second round	22–28 October 2025

== Entrants ==
Fifty-two CAF national women's teams were eligible to enter qualification as Morocco had already qualified as hosts, though only 38 teams registered. The six teams ranked highest in the FIFA Women's World Ranking were given a bye to the second round, and the next 16 highest-ranked teams were seeded in the first round and played the second leg at home.

Final tournament hosts
Team	Rank
**Morocco**	59

Teams entering qualifying rounds (Note: Teams in bold qualified for the final tournament)

Bye to second round
Team	Rank
Nigeria	36
South Africa	50
Zambia	62
Ghana	66
Cameroon	69
Ivory Coast	71

First round seeded teams
Team	Rank
Tunisia	78
**Mali**	81
Equatorial Guinea	82
**Senegal**	83
**Algeria**	84
**Egypt**	93
DR Congo	102
Congo	112
Togo	120
Ethiopia	123
Zimbabwe	124
Namibia	125
Gambia	127
**Cape Verde**	130
**Burkina Faso**	136
Sierra Leone	141

First round unseeded teams
Team	Rank
Guinea	142
Gabon	143
**Tanzania**	145
Angola	148
Uganda	150
**Kenya**	151
Benin	152
Botswana	153
**Malawi**	156
Niger	166
Rwanda	167
Burundi	178
Eswatini	182
South Sudan	192
Chad	NR
Djibouti	NR

Did not enter
Team	Rank
Central African Republic	144
Liberia	165
Seychelles	170
Mozambique	171
Lesotho	176
Guinea-Bissau	177
Comoros	188
Madagascar	190
Mauritius	194
Libya	NR
Eritrea	NR
Sudan	NR
Mauritania	NR
São Tomé and Príncipe	NR

=== Pots ===
The 32 teams playing in the first round were allocated into six pots based on a combination of their FIFA Ranking and geographical considerations, with neighboring zones paired together where possible according to the number of teams. The seedings, pots, and draw procedure were confirmed by CAF on 12 December 2024.

Pot 1 / Unseeded (COSAFA & CECAFA)
Team	Rank
Angola	151
Botswana	153
Malawi	156
Eswatini	182
Tanzania	145
Uganda	148

Pot 2 / Seeded (COSAFA, CECAFA & UNIFFAC)
Team	Rank
Ethiopia	124
Zimbabwe	127
Namibia	122
Equatorial Guinea	82
DR Congo	109
Congo	112

Pot 3 / Unseeded (CECAFA)
Team	Rank
Kenya	149
Rwanda	168
Burundi	178
South Sudan	193
Djibouti	NR

Pot 4 / Seeded (UNAF & WAFU B)
Team	Rank
Tunisia	78
Algeria	84
Egypt	92
Togo	120
Burkina Faso	137

Pot 5 / Unseeded (WAFU & UNIFFAC)
Team	Rank
Guinea	142
Benin	152
Niger	167
Gabon	143
Chad	NR

Pot 6 / Seeded (WAFU A)
Team	Rank
Mali	81
Senegal	83
Gambia	126
Cape Verde	129
Sierra Leone	141

=== Draw ===
The draw for the 2026 Women's Africa Cup of Nations Qualifiers took place on 12 December 2024 at 12:00 GMT.

== First round ==
=== Summary ===
Team 1	Agg.	Team 2	1st leg	2nd leg
Angola	3–3 (5–4 p)	Zimbabwe	2–1	1–2
Malawi	w/o	Congo	—	—
Botswana	0–2	DR Congo	0–2	0–0
Tanzania	4–2	Equatorial Guinea	3–1	1–1
Uganda	2–2 (4–5 p)	Ethiopia	2–0	0–2
Eswatini	0–4	Namibia	0–3	0–1
Burundi	1–5	Burkina Faso	0–1	1–4
Djibouti	0–10	Togo	0–5	0–5
South Sudan	0–8	Algeria	0–5	0–3
Rwanda	2–3	Egypt	0–1	2–2
Kenya	1–0	Tunisia	0–0	1–0
Niger	1–4	Gambia	0–2	1–2
Benin	5–2	Sierra Leone	2–1	3–1
Guinea	3–6	Cape Verde	2–2	1–4
Gabon	1–10	Mali	0–6	1–4
Chad	w/o	Senegal	—	—

=== Matches ===
20 February 2025
16:00 UTC+1

Angola	2–1	Zimbabwe
Ary Papel 1', 73'	Report	Mucherera 17'

Estádio Joaquim Dinis, Luanda
26 February 2025
15:00 UTC+2

Zimbabwe	2–1	Angola
Chinyerere 35'; Katona 44'	Report	Ary Papel 78'
Penalties
Ncube (penalty scored); Chirandu (penalty scored); Kaitano (penalty scored); Kanyai (penalty scored); Magwede (penalty missed)	4–5	(penalty scored) Cristina; (penalty scored) Margareth; (penalty scored) Ketcha; (penalty scored) Docarsia; (penalty scored) Ngonguinha

Lucas Moripe Stadium, Pretoria (South Africa)
Referee: Aline Guimbang Etong (Cameroon)

3–3 on aggregate. Angola won 5–4 on penalties.

20 February 2025
15:00 UTC+2

Malawi	Cancelled	Congo
	Report

Bingu National Stadium, Lilongwe
26 February 2025
15:30 UTC+1

Congo	Cancelled	Malawi
	Report

Stade Alphonse Massemba-Débat, Brazzaville

Malawi won on walkover and advanced to the second round after Congo withdrew prior to the first leg due to a lack of competitions and preparation.

20 February 2025
15:00 UTC+2

Botswana	0–2	DR Congo
	Report	Gaofetoge 1' (o.g.); Mabomba 90+8'

Obed Itani Chilume Stadium, Francistown
Referee: Aïssata Lam (Mauritania)
26 February 2025
17:00 UTC+1

DR Congo	0–0	Botswana
	Report

Stade des Martyrs, Kinshasa
Referee: Shamirah Nabadda (Uganda)

DR Congo won 2–0 on aggregate.

20 February 2025
16:00 UTC+3

Tanzania	3–1	Equatorial Guinea
Athumani 49'; Kasonga 55'; Msewa 90+1'	Report	Midje 42'

Azam Complex Stadium, Dar es Salaam
Referee: Zouwaira Souley Sani (Niger)
26 February 2025
19:00 UTC+1

Equatorial Guinea	1–1	Tanzania
Chuigoué 9'	Report	Kasonga 73'

Estadio de Malabo, Malabo
Referee: Mercy Mayimbo (Zimbabwe)

Tanzania won 4–2 on aggregate.

21 February 2025
16:00 UTC+3

Uganda	2–0	Ethiopia
Namuleme 90'; Ikwaput 90+3'	Report

Hamz Stadium, Kampala
Referee: Joséphine Ngo Biem (Cameroon)
26 February 2025
15:00 UTC+3

Ethiopia	2–0	Uganda
Kalsa 66'; Girma 90+6'	Report
Penalties
Addissu (penalty scored); Daniel (penalty scored); Girma (penalty scored); Feleke (penalty scored); Wakuma (penalty missed); Amare (penalty scored)	5–4	(penalty scored) Namuleme; (penalty scored) Nabirye; (penalty missed) Nabbumba; (penalty scored) Nabulime; (penalty scored) Nantongo; (penalty missed) Kobusobozi

Abebe Bikila Stadium, Addis Ababa
Referee: Patience Madu Ndidi (Nigeria)

2–2 on aggregate. Ethiopia won 5–4 on penalties.

21 February 2025
15:00 UTC+2

Eswatini	0–3	Namibia
	Report	Vliete 2'; Kooper 18'; Kanyama 90+4'

Somhlolo National Stadium, Lobamba
Referee: Suavis Iratunga (Burundi)
26 February 2025
15:00 UTC+2

Namibia	1–0	Eswatini
Blou 3'	Report

Dobsonville Stadium, Johannesburg (South Africa)

Namibia won 4–0 on aggregate.

23 February 2025
16:00 UTC+0

Burundi	0–1	Burkina Faso
	Report	M. Traoré 24'

Stade Mamadou Konaté, Bamako (Mali)
Referee: Bouchra Karboubi (Morocco)
26 February 2025
16:00 UTC+0

Burkina Faso	4–1	Burundi
Kabré 19', 44', 90'; Millogo 63'	Report	Habonimana 84'

Stade du 26 Mars, Bamako (Mali)

Burkina Faso won 5–1 on aggregate.

21 February 2025
16:00 UTC+0

Djibouti	0–5	Togo
	Report	Woedikou 9', 58'; Gnintegma 45+1'; Dogli 47'; Sama 77'

Stade de Kégué, Lomé (Togo)
Referee: Gloria Sambumba (Zambia)
26 February 2025
16:00 UTC+0

Togo	5–0	Djibouti
Sama 27'; N'djambara 58'; Gnintegma 81', 87'; Badate 85'	Report

Stade de Kégué, Lomé
Referee: Isatou Touray (Gambia)

Togo won 10–0 on aggregate.

19 February 2025
16:00 UTC+3

South Sudan	0–5	Algeria
	Report	Taleb Muller 19'; Abadou 41'; Bouhani 49'; Karchouni 56' (pen.); Lokeri 86' (o.g.)

Juba Stadium, Juba
Referee: Richy Nganda Madiamba (Gabon)
25 February 2025
19:00 UTC+1

Algeria	3–0	South Sudan
Karchouni 15', 89'; Taleb Muller 53'	Report

Mustapha Tchaker Stadium, Blida
Referee: Nonjabulo Nonhle Ndlela (South Africa)

Algeria won 8–0 on aggregate.

21 February 2025
15:00 UTC+2

Rwanda	0–1	Egypt
	Report	Essam 64'

Kigali Pelé Stadium, Kigali
Referee: Sylvina Garnett (Liberia)
25 February 2025
18:00 UTC+2

Egypt	2–2	Rwanda
Tarek 6'; Essam 68'	Report	Zawadi 26', 90+5'

Suez Canal Stadium, Ismailia
Referee: Mariétou Fall (Senegal)

Egypt won 3–2 on aggregate.

21 February 2025
15:00 UTC+3

Kenya	0–0	Tunisia
	Report

Ulinzi Sports Complex, Nairobi
26 February 2025
14:00 UTC+1

Tunisia	0–1	Kenya
	Report	Engesha 4'

Sousse Olympic Stadium, Sousse
Referee: Vincentia Amedome (Togo)

Kenya won 1–0 on aggregate.

19 February 2025
16:00 UTC+1

Niger	0–2	Gambia
	Report	Sonko 21'; Kanteh 45'

Stade Général Seyni Kountché, Niamey
Referee: Aline Umutoni (Rwanda)
24 February 2025
14:00 UTC+0

Gambia	2–1	Niger
Darboe 11'; Kanteh 25'	Report	Ahmed Sidi 23'

Stade Lat-Dior, Thiès (Senegal)
Referee: Dorsaf Ganouati (Tunisia)

Gambia won 4–1 on aggregate.

20 February 2025
17:00 UTC+0

Benin	2–1	Sierra Leone
Gbedjissi 24', 45' (pen.)	Report	K. A. Kamara 36'

Stade de Kégué, Lomé (Togo)
24 February 2025
16:00 UTC+0

Sierra Leone	1–3	Benin
K. Z. Brima 90+6'	Report	Ahouassou 38'; Honfo 44'; Gbedjissi 90+2' (pen.)

Samuel Kanyon Doe Sports Complex, Monrovia (Liberia)

Benin won 5–2 on aggregate.

21 February 2025
15:30 UTC+0

Guinea	2–2	Cape Verde
A. Camara 62'; Moreira 90+5' (o.g.)	Report	Fortes 42'; da Luz 45+1'

Stade Lat-Dior, Thiès (Senegal)
Referee: Ghada Mehat (Algeria)
26 February 2025
16:00 UTC−1

Cape Verde	4–1	Guinea
Moreira 11'; Pereira 22', 28'; da Luz 87'	Report	Mar. Camara 30'

Estádio Nacional de Cabo Verde, Praia

Cape Verde won 6–3 on aggregate.

20 February 2025
15:30 UTC+1

Gabon	0–6	Mali
	Report	A. Traoré 3', 7'; A. Diarra 20', 34'; F. Dembele 55'; F. Niakaté 74'

Stade de Franceville, Franceville
Referee: Zakia El Grini (Morocco)
25 February 2025
18:00 UTC+0

Mali	4–1	Gabon
A. Diarra 22' (pen.); S. Diarra 36'; Sogoré 43'; Tapily 82'	Report	Assengone 81' (pen.)

Stade du 26 Mars, Bamako

Mali won 10–1 on aggregate.

21 February 2025
16:00 UTC+0

Chad	Cancelled	Senegal
	Report

Stade Félix Houphouët-Boigny, Abidjan (Ivory Coast)
26 February 2025
17:00 UTC+0

Senegal	Cancelled	Chad
	Report

Stade Lat-Dior, Thiès

Senegal won on walkover and advanced to the second round after Chad withdrew prior to the first leg due to delays in the disbursement process of the funds needed for match preparations and lack of funding.

== Second round ==
=== Summary ===
Team 1	Agg.	Team 2	1st leg	2nd leg
Angola	0–2	Malawi	0–0	0–2
DR Congo	1–2	South Africa	1–1	0–1
Tanzania	3–0	Ethiopia	2–0	1–0
Namibia	2–7	Zambia	2–4	0–3
Burkina Faso	3–0	Togo	2–0	1–0
Algeria	3–1	Cameroon	2–1	1–0
Egypt	0–7	Ghana	0–3	0–4
Kenya	4–1	Gambia	3–1	1–0
Benin	1–3	Nigeria	0–2	1–1
Cape Verde	4–3	Mali	0–1	4–2
Senegal	0–0 (5–4 p)	Ivory Coast	0–0	0–0

=== Matches ===
23 October 2025
16:00 UTC+1

Angola	0–0	Malawi
	Report (FIFA)

Estádio 11 de Novembro, Luanda
Referee: Aline Umutoni (Rwanda)
28 October 2025
15:00 UTC+2

Malawi	2–0	Angola
Chinzimu 82', 84'	Report (FIFA)

Bingu National Stadium, Lilongwe
Referee: Rachel Zihindula (DR Congo)

Malawi won 2–0 on aggregate.

22 October 2025
17:00 UTC+1

DR Congo	1–1	South Africa
Kipoyi 45+1'	Report (FIFA)	Mohlakoana 42'

Stade des Martyrs, Kinshasa
28 October 2025
19:00 UTC+2

South Africa	1–0	DR Congo
Kgatlana 90+1'	Report (FIFA)

Dobsonville Stadium, Johannesburg

South Africa won 2–1 on aggregate.

22 October 2025
17:00 UTC+3

Tanzania	2–0	Ethiopia
Mnunka 7'; Mnunduka 54'	Report (FIFA)

Azam Complex Stadium, Chamazi
Referee: Aminata Fullah (Sierra Leone)
28 October 2025
15:00 UTC+3

Ethiopia	0–1	Tanzania
	Report (FIFA)	Msewa 15'

Dire Dawa Stadium, Dire Dawa
Referee: Agnes Ngoma (Congo)

Tanzania won 3–0 on aggregate.

22 October 2025
15:00 UTC+2

Namibia	2–4	Zambia
Kooper 52'; Coleman 59' (pen.)	Report (FIFA)	Kundananji 13', 71', 90+4'; Nachula 17'

Dobsonville Stadium, Johannesburg (South Africa)
Referee: Tatu Malogo (Tanzania)
26 October 2025
15:00 UTC+2

Zambia	3–0	Namibia
Kundananji 21'; E. Phiri 33'; Chuilufya 47'	Report (FIFA)

Levy Mwanawasa Stadium, Ndola
Referee: Dorsaf Ganouati (Tunisia)

Zambia won 7–2 on aggregate.

24 October 2025
16:00 UTC+0

Burkina Faso	2–0	Togo
R. Sawadogo 65' (pen.); Kabré 89' (pen.)	Report (FIFA)

Stade du 4 Août, Ouagadougou
Referee: Mariétou Fall (Senegal)
28 October 2025
16:00 UTC+0

Togo	0–1	Burkina Faso
	Report (FIFA)	Congo 45+4'

Stade de Kégué, Lomé
Referee: Zakia El Grini (Morocco)

Burkina Faso won 3–0 on aggregate.

23 October 2025
19:00 UTC+1

Algeria	2–1	Cameroon
Karchouni 23'; Dafeur 35'	Report (FIFA)	Nchout 90+4' (pen.)

Miloud Hadefi Stadium, Oran
Referee: Awa Ilboudo (Burkina Faso)
28 October 2025
15:30 UTC+1

Cameroon	0–1	Algeria
	Report (FIFA)	Dafeur 23'

Stade de la Réunification, Douala
Attendance: 0 (Behind closed doors)
Referee: Diana Murungi (Uganda)

Algeria won 3–1 on aggregate.

23 October 2025
18:00 UTC+2

Egypt	0–3	Ghana
	Report (FIFA)	Boaduwaa 42'; Amponsah 85'; Asantewaa 90+2'

Suez Canal Stadium, Ismailia
Referee: Akhona Makalima (South Africa)
28 October 2025
15:30 UTC+0

Ghana	4–0	Egypt
Boaduwaa 52', 55', 90+2'; Yeboah 57'	Report (FIFA)

Accra Sports Stadium, Accra
Referee: Antsino Twanyanyukwa (Namibia)

Ghana won 7–0 on aggregate.

24 October 2025
16:00 UTC+3

Kenya	3–1	Gambia
Jereko 12' (pen.); Adhiambo 19'; Opisa 45+2'	Report (FIFA)	Kanteh 2'

Nyayo National Stadium, Nairobi
Referee: Aline Guimbang Etong (Cameroon)
28 October 2025
16:00 UTC+0

Gambia	0–1	Kenya
	Report (FIFA)	Jereko 51'

Stade Lat-Dior, Thiès (Senegal)

Kenya won 4–1 on aggregate.

24 October 2025
15:00 UTC+1

Benin	0–2	Nigeria
	Report (FIFA)	Ihezuo 25'; Okoronkwo 45+2'

Stade de Kégué, Lomé (Togo)
Referee: Fatou Ngum (Gambia)
28 October 2025
16:00 UTC+1

Nigeria	1–1	Benin
Plumptre 12'	Report (FIFA)	Djibril 61'

MKO Abiola Stadium, Abeokuta
Referee: Dominique Hanjavola (Madagascar)

Nigeria won 3–1 on aggregate.

24 October 2025
15:00 UTC−1

Cape Verde	0–1	Mali
	Report (FIFA)	C. Dembele 81'

Estádio Nacional de Cabo Verde, Praia
Referee: Aicha Bit Oumarou (Chad)
28 October 2025
17:00 UTC+0

Mali	2–4	Cape Verde
Kone 55', 88'	Report; Report (FIFA)	Melo 14'; Moreira 17'; Vieira 24'; Pereira 72'

Stade du 26 Mars, Bamako
Referee: Kindédji Edoh (Togo)

Cape Verde won 4–3 on aggregate.

24 October 2025
17:00 UTC+0

Senegal	0–0	Ivory Coast
	Report (FIFA)

Stade Lat-Dior, Thiès
Referee: Mercy Mayimbo (Zimbabwe)
28 October 2025
19:00 UTC+0

Ivory Coast	0–0	Senegal
	Report (FIFA)
Penalties
Kakounan (penalty scored); Kreto (penalty scored); Gbehi (penalty missed); Elloh (penalty scored); Kouassi (penalty scored)	4–5	(penalty scored) Diop; (penalty scored) Diakhaté; (penalty scored) N. Ndiaye; (penalty scored) Diallo; (penalty scored) Babou

Stade Felix Houphouet-Boigny, Abidjan
Referee: Shahenda El Maghrabi (Egypt)

0–0 on aggregate. Senegal won 5–4 on penalties.

== Repechage ==
The best four second round losers chosen by repechage according to the FIFA Women's World Ranking (as of 7 August 2025) below:

Team	Ranking
Cameroon	66
Ivory Coast	71
Mali	79
Egypt	95
DR Congo	116
Togo	120
Namibia	123
Gambia	124
Ethiopia	128
Benin	144
Angola	152

== Qualified teams ==
The following teams qualified for the final tournament.

Team	Qualified as	Qualified on	Previous appearances in Women's Africa Cup of Nations^{1}
Morocco	Hosts	17 October 2024	4 (1998, 2000, 2022, 2024)
Zambia	Second round winners	26 October 2025	4 (2014, 2018, 2022, 2024)
Tanzania	Second round winners	28 October 2025	2 (2010, 2024)
Malawi	Second round winners	28 October 2025	0 (debut)
Algeria	Second round winners	28 October 2025	6 (2004, 2006, 2010, 2014, 2018, 2024)
Nigeria	Second round winners	28 October 2025	13 (**1998**, **2000**, **2002**, **2004**, **2006**, 2008, **2010**, 2012, **2014**, **2016**, **2018**, 2022, **2024**)
Ghana	Second round winners	28 October 2025	11 (1998, 2000, 2002, 2004, 2006, 2008, 2010, 2014, 2016, 2018, 2024)
Burkina Faso	Second round winners	28 October 2025	1 (2022)
Kenya	Second round winners	28 October 2025	1 (2016)
South Africa	Second round winners	28 October 2025	13 (1998, 2000, 2002, 2004, 2006, 2008, 2010, 2012, 2014, 2016, 2018, **2022**, 2024)
Cape Verde	Second round winners	28 October 2025	0 (debut)
Senegal	Second round winners	28 October 2025	3 (2012, 2022, 2024)
Cameroon	Second round lucky losers	3 November 2025	12 (1998, 2000, 2002, 2004, 2006, 2008, 2010, 2012, 2014, 2016, 2018, 2022)
Ivory Coast	Second round lucky losers	3 November 2025	2 (2012, 2014)
Mali	Second round lucky losers	3 November 2025	8 (2002, 2004, 2006, 2008, 2010, 2016, 2018, 2024)
Egypt	Second round lucky losers	3 November 2025	2 (1998, 2016)

^{1} Bold indicates champions for that year. Italic indicates hosts for that year.

== Goalscorers ==
There were 131 goals scored in 50 matches, for an average of 2.62 goals per match.

4 goals

- (Algeria women's national football team) Ghoutia Karchouni
- (Burkina Faso women's national football team) Adèle Kabré
- (Ghana women's national football team) Doris Boaduwaa
- (Zambia women's national football team) Racheal Kundananji

3 goals

- (Angola women's national football team) Ary Papel
- (Benin women's national football team) Aude Gbedjissi
- (Cape Verde women's national football team) Evy Pereira
- (Gambia women's national football team) Fatou Kanteh
- (Mali women's national football team) Agueissa Diarra
- (Togo women's national football team) Odette Gnintegma

2 goals

- (Algeria women's national football team) Marine Dafeur
- (Algeria women's national football team) Laura Taleb Muller
- (Cape Verde women's national football team) Varsénia da Luz
- (Cape Verde women's national football team) Ivânia Moreira
- (Egypt women's national football team) Habiba Essam
- (Kenya women's national football team) Mwanalima Adam Jereko
- (Malawi women's national football team) Faith Chinzimu
- (Mali women's national football team) Oumou Kone
- (Mali women's national football team) Aïssata Traoré
- (Namibia women's national football team) Ivone Kooper
- (Rwanda women's national football team) Usanase Zawadi
- (Tanzania women's national football team) Enekia Kasonga
- (Tanzania women's national football team) Diana Msewa
- (Togo women's national football team) Koudjoukalo Sama
- (Togo women's national football team) Mafille Woedikou

1 goal

- (Algeria women's national football team) Léa Abadou
- (Algeria women's national football team) Naïma Bouhani
- (Benin women's national football team) Marguérite Ahouassou
- (Benin women's national football team) Yasminath Djibril
- (Benin women's national football team) Germaine Honfo
- (Burkina Faso women's national football team) Adama Congo
- (Burkina Faso women's national football team) Charlotte Millogo
- (Burkina Faso women's national football team) Rasmata Sawadogo
- (Burkina Faso women's national football team) Madina Traoré
- (Burundi women's national football team) Esperance Habonimana
- (Cameroon women's national football team) Ajara Nchout
- (Cape Verde women's national football team) Melany Fortes
- (Cape Verde women's national football team) Larissa Melo
- (Cape Verde women's national football team) Eleia Vieira
- (DR Congo women's national football team) Ruth Kipoyi
- (DR Congo women's national football team) Gloria Mabomba
- (Egypt women's national football team) Menna Tarek
- (Equatorial Guinea women's national football team) Dorine Chuigoué
- (Equatorial Guinea women's national football team) Shalma Midje
- (Ethiopia women's national football team) Etsegenet Girma
- (Ethiopia women's national football team) Aregash Kalsa
- (Gabon women's national football team) Laschwana Assengone
- (Gambia women's national football team) Mbassey Darboe
- (Gambia women's national football team) Fatou Sonko
- (Ghana women's national football team) Mary Amponsah
- (Ghana women's national football team) Grace Asantewaa
- (Ghana women's national football team) Comfort Yeboah
- (Guinea women's national football team) Aminata Camara
- (Guinea women's national football team) Marie Camara
- (Kenya women's national football team) Fasila Adhiambo
- (Kenya women's national football team) Terry Engesha
- (Kenya women's national football team) Shalyne Opisa
- (Mali women's national football team) Coumba Dembele
- (Mali women's national football team) Fatou Dembele
- (Mali women's national football team) Salimata Diarra
- (Mali women's national football team) Fatoumata Niakaté
- (Mali women's national football team) Coulouba Sogoré
- (Mali women's national football team) Aïssata Tapily
- (Namibia women's national football team) Juliana Blou
- (Namibia women's national football team) Zenatha Coleman
- (Namibia women's national football team) Hilma Kanyama
- (Namibia women's national football team) Fiola Vliete
- (Niger women's national football team) Faouzia Ahmed Sidi
- (Nigeria women's national football team) Chinwendu Ihezuo
- (Nigeria women's national football team) Esther Okoronkwo
- (Nigeria women's national football team) Ashleigh Plumptre
- (Sierra Leone women's national football team) Kadiatu Abdulai Kamara
- (Sierra Leone women's national football team) Kumba Zainab Brima
- (South Africa women's national soccer team) Thembi Kgatlana
- (South Africa women's national soccer team) Kgalebane Mohlakoana
- (Tanzania women's national football team) Stumai Athumani
- (Tanzania women's national football team) Jamila Mnunduka
- (Tanzania women's national football team) Aisha Mnunka
- (Togo women's national football team) Nathalie Badate
- (Togo women's national football team) Amiratou N'djambara
- (Togo women's national football team) Afi Rifela Dogli
- (Uganda women's national football team) Fazila Ikwaput
- (Uganda women's national football team) Zainah Namuleme
- (Zambia women's national football team) Prisca Chilufya
- (Zambia women's national football team) Racheal Nachula
- (Zambia women's national football team) Eneless Phiri
- (Zimbabwe women's national football team) Ethel Chinyerere
- (Zimbabwe women's national football team) Christabel Katona
- (Zimbabwe women's national football team) Ruvimbo Mucherera

1 own goal

- (Botswana women's national football team) Lone Gaofetoge (against DR Congo)
- (Cape Verde women's national football team) Ivânia Moreira (against Guinea)
- (South Sudan women's national football team) Dorka Lokeri (against Algeria)
