= Ivânia Moreira =

Cape Verden footballer (born 1993)

Personal information
- Full name: Ivânia Tavares Moreira
- Date of birth: 13 May 1993 (age 33)
- Position: Striker

Team information
- Current team: Amora

Senior career*
Years	Team	Apps	(Gls)
2023–2024	Racing Power	2	(0)
2024–	Amora	0	(0)

International career
- Cape Verde
- * Club domestic league appearances and goals as of 14 January 2024

Ivânia Tavares Moreira (Portuguese: [i.ˈvɐ.ni.ɐ tɐ.ˈva.ɾɨʒ mu.ˈɾej.ɾɐ], born 13 May 1993), also known by the nickname Vá Moreira (Kabuverdianu: [va mu.ˈɾej.ɾɐ]) , is a Cape Verdean footballer who plays as a striker for Campeonato Nacional II Divisão Feminino club Amora and the Cape Verde women's national team.

== Early life ==
Moreira started playing football at a young age with her brother. She grew up in Santa Cruz, Cape Verde.

== Career ==
Moreira has been described as a "a reference in women's football in Cape Verde". She was the top scorer of the 2023 Santiago Sul Regional with eighteen goals.

== International goals ==
No.	Date	Venue	Opponent	Score	Result	Competition
1.	20 January 2025	Estádio Marcelo Leitão, Espargos, Cape Verde	Guinea-Bissau	1–0	4–0	2023 WAFU Zone A Women's Cup
2.	20 January 2025	Estádio Marcelo Leitão, Espargos, Cape Verde	Guinea-Bissau	3–0	4–0	2023 WAFU Zone A Women's Cup
3.	24 January 2023	Estádio Marcelo Leitão, Espargos, Cape Verde	Mauritania	1–0	6–0	2023 WAFU Zone A Women's Cup
4.	24 January 2023	Estádio Marcelo Leitão, Espargos, Cape Verde	Mauritania	2–0	6–0	2023 WAFU Zone A Women's Cup
5.	24 January 2023	Estádio Marcelo Leitão, Espargos, Cape Verde	Mauritania	3–0	6–0	2023 WAFU Zone A Women's Cup
6.	24 January 2023	Estádio Marcelo Leitão, Espargos, Cape Verde	Mauritania	5–0	6–0	2023 WAFU Zone A Women's Cup
7.	24 January 2023	Estádio Marcelo Leitão, Espargos, Cape Verde	Mauritania	6–0	6–0	2023 WAFU Zone A Women's Cup
8.	22 September 2023	Estádio Nacional de Cabo Verde, Praia, Cape Verde	Liberia	1–0	3–0	2024 Women's Africa Cup of Nations qualification
9.	22 September 2023	Estádio Nacional de Cabo Verde, Praia, Cape Verde	Liberia	3–0	3–0	2024 Women's Africa Cup of Nations qualification
10.	26 February 2025	Estádio Nacional de Cabo Verde, Praia, Cape Verde	Guinea	1–0	4–1	2026 Women's Africa Cup of Nations qualification
11.	28 October 2025	Stade du 26 Mars, Bamako, Mali	Mali	2–0	4–2	2026 Women's Africa Cup of Nations qualification

== Personal life ==
Moreira is nicknamed "Vá".
