= Irlanda Lopes =

Cape Verdean footballer (born 1996)

Personal information
- Full name: Irlanda Tavares Spínola Lopes
- Date of birth: 6 October 1996 (age 30)
- Place of birth: Fogo, Cape Verde
- Position: Forward

Team information
- Current team: Vitória de Guimarães
- Number: 25

Senior career*
Years	Team	Apps	(Gls)
2016–2017	Beira Baixa		
2017–2018	Águias Vermelhas		
2020–2022	Seven Stars		
2022–2023	Torreense	3	(0)
2023–2025	Amora	39	(18)
2025–	Vitória de Guimarães	2	(2)

International career^{‡}
2018–	Cape Verde	15	(3)
- * Club domestic league appearances and goals as of 19 February 2025 ‡ National team caps and goals as of 26 February 2025

Irlanda Tavares Spínola Lopes (Portuguese: [iɾ.ˈlɐ̃.dɐ tɐ.ˈva.ɾɨʃ ˈspi.nu.lɐ ˈlɔ.pɨʃ], born 6 October 1996), commonly known as Irlanda Lopes and is nicknamed Irlas Messi (Kabuverdianu: [ˈiɾ.lɐs ˈmɛ.si]), is a Cape Verdean professional footballer who plays as a forward for Campeonato Nacional II Divisão Feminino club Vitória de Guimarães and the Cape Verde national team.

== Club career ==
In July 2021, she represented the Praia-based club in the inaugural 2021 CAF Women's Champions League WAFU Zone A Qualifiers, scoring twice to secure the club's first and only points in the competition.

On 2 September 2022, Lopes returned to Portugal and signed for Liga BPI side Torreense.

In August 2023, Irlas joined Amora in the Campeonato Nacional II Divisão Feminino. On 9 September 2023, she debuted for the club in a 6–0 win over Vitória. 21 days later she scored her first goal for the club against CF Benfica.

In February 2025, Vitória de Guimarães announced the signing of Lopes to strengthen the squad for the second half of the promotion phase to the league. On 8 February 2025, She made her debut for the club in a 3–0 win over CF Benfica. The following week, she made her first start and scored twice in a 6–0 victory over U.D. Leiria.

== International career ==
In November 2018, Lopes was called up to Cape Verde's first-ever women's national team for a friendly against Guinea-Bissau. In February 2020, she was called up for the Crioulos' debut in the 2020 WAFU Zone A Women's Cup. Her hat-trick on the final day of the group stage against Guinea, which included her first international goal, secured Cape Verde's spot in the semi-finals.

== Career statistics ==
As of match played 26 February 2025

Appearances and goals by national team and year
National team	Year	Apps	Goals
Cape Verde	2018	1	0
Cape Verde	2019	1	0
Cape Verde	2020	5	3
Cape Verde	2021	2	0
Cape Verde	2022	1	0
Cape Verde	2023	3	0
Cape Verde	2025	2	0
Total		15	3

=== International ===
Scores and results list Cape Verde's goal tally first, score column indicates score after each Lopes goal.

List of international goals scored by Irlanda Lopes
No.	Date	Venue	Opponent	Score	Result	Competition
1	1 March 2020	Wusum Sports Stadium, Makeni, Sierra Leone	Guinea	1–0	3–0	2020 WAFU Zone A Women's Cup
2	1 March 2020	Wusum Sports Stadium, Makeni, Sierra Leone	Guinea	2–0	3–0	2020 WAFU Zone A Women's Cup
3	1 March 2020	Wusum Sports Stadium, Makeni, Sierra Leone	Guinea	3–0	3–0	2020 WAFU Zone A Women's Cup
