= Korka Fall =

Senegalese footballer (born 1990)

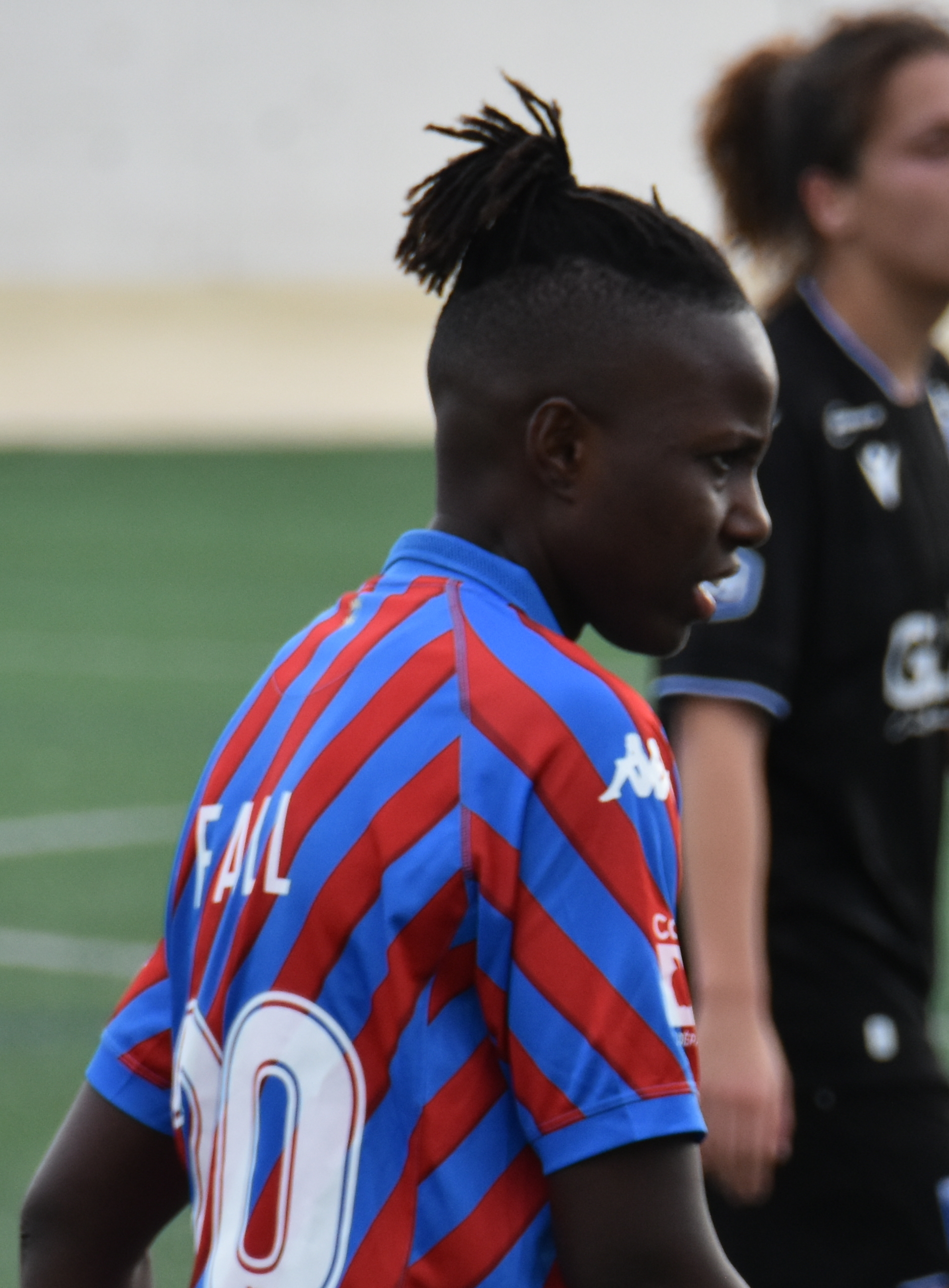
- Fall playing for Caen in 2024

Personal information
- Date of birth: 19 February 1990 (age 36)
- Place of birth: Mbour, Senegal
- Height: 1.70 m (5 ft 7 in)
- Position: Forward

Team information
- Current team: Grenoble
- Number: 25

Senior career*
Years	Team	Apps	(Gls)
- Dorades Mbour
- Zaragoza CFF
- Aigles de la Médina
- Dorades Mbour
2023–2024	Grenoble	14	(3)
2024–	Caen	30	(18)

International career^{‡}
	Senegal	8	(1)
- * Club domestic league appearances and goals as of 29 April 2026 ‡ National team caps and goals as of 21:45, 17 July 2022 (UTC)

Korka Fall (born 19 February 1990) is a Senegalese footballer who plays as a forward for Division 3 Féminine club SM Caen and the Senegal women's national team. She is a member of the Senegal women's national football team. She was part of the team at the 2012 African Women's Championship, and has continued to play for the team through to 2016. On club level she played for Zaragoza CFF in Spain, where she was the first African player in the women's Primera División, and Dorades Mbour in Senegal.

== Career ==
=== Club ===
Korka Fall joined Spanish side Zaragoza CFF from Senegalese team Dorades Mbour in April 2010, becoming the first African player to play in the Primera División, the highest level of women's football in Spain. She was signed to a three-year contract, with the move seen as strengthening the squad ready for the Copa de la Reina de Fútbol competition.

By 2012, she had moved to play for Senegalese side Aigles de la Médina. She was nominated in 2013 for African Women's Footballer of the year at the Africa Top Sports Awards, the only Senegalese player to be included in the category. By 2014, Fall was playing for Dorades Mbour once again, in the Senegalese second division. She scored a penalty to win the final match of the season against Teddungal de Vélingara, giving the second division title to Mbour.

=== International ===
Fall plays for the Senegal women's national football team, including at the 2012 African Women's Championship. She continued to play for the team, recently during the 2016 Africa Women Cup of Nations qualification when she was brought on as a substitute for Fanta Sy against Guinea.

== International goals ==
No.	Date	Venue	Opponent	Score	Result	Competition
1.	5 July 2022	Prince Moulay Abdellah Stadium, Rabat, Morocco	Burkina Faso	1–0	1–0	2022 Women's Africa Cup of Nations
2.	21 January 2023	Estádio Marcelo Leitão, Sal, Cape Verde	Guinea	3–0	4–0	2023 WAFU Zone A Women's Cup
3.	27 January 2023	Estádio Marcelo Leitão, Sal, Cape Verde	Guinea-Bissau	4–0	4–0	2023 WAFU Zone A Women's Cup
4.	29 January 2023	Estádio Marcelo Leitão, Sal, Cape Verde	Cape Verde	1–0	1–0	2023 WAFU Zone A Women's Cup
5.	18 April 2023	Stade Lat-Dior, Thiès, Senegal	Algeria	3–0	4–0	Friendly
6.	31 October 2023	Stade Municipal d'Ariana, Ariana, Tunisia	Tunisia	2–0	3–2	Friendly
7.	16 April 2026	Stade Léopold Sédar Senghor, Dakar, Senegal	Burkina Faso	1–1	3–3	Friendly
8.	16 April 2026	Stade Léopold Sédar Senghor, Dakar, Senegal	Burkina Faso	2–1	3–3	Friendly
9.	16 April 2026	Stade Léopold Sédar Senghor, Dakar, Senegal	Burkina Faso	3–3	3–3	Friendly
