= Evy Pereira =

Cape Verdean footballer (born 1994)

Personal information
- Full name: Eveline Nadine Pereira Varela
- Date of birth: March 27, 1994 (age 32)
- Place of birth: Praia, Cape Verde
- Height: 1.65 m (5 ft 5 in)
- Position: Forward

Team information
- Current team: Valadares Gaia

Senior career*
Years	Team	Apps	(Gls)
2014–2016	Atlético Ouriense		
2016–2018	Valadares Gaia	32	(14)
2018–2021	SL Benfica	35	(42)
2021–2022	SC Braga	11	(0)
2022–2024	Racing Power	53	(12)
2024–2025	Beşiktaş	15	(1)
2025	Valadares Gaia	15	(6)

International career
2022–	Cape Verde	7	(6)
- * Club domestic league appearances and goals

Eveline Nadine Pereira Varela (Portuguese: [e.vɨ.ˈli.nɨ naˈdi.nɨ pɨ.ˈɾej.ɾɐ vɐ.ˈɾɛ.lɐ], born 27 March 1994), commonly known as Evy Pereira (Kabuverdianu: [e.ˈvi]), is a Cape Verdean professional footballer who plays as a forward for Turkcell Women's Football Super League club Beşiktaş and the Cape Verde national team.

== Club career ==
Pereira started playing football at Escola de Preparação Integral de Futebol (EPIF), where she spent nearly a decade. She then joined Praia side Seven Stars, winning the championship while being named both the best player and top scorer. Her performances earned her a move to Portugal later that year, signing with Atlético Ouriense in January 2015.

On 19 March 2018, SL Benfica confirmed the signing of the Cape Verdean striker for the 2018–19 season in the National II Division. In June 2019, She renewed her contract with the club. In June 2021, she bid farewell to the club after three seasons, during which she secured the Portuguese Second Division title, the Portuguese Cup, the Super Cup, two League Cups, and played a key role in Benfica's Liga BPI victory.

On 25 July 2021, joined fellow Campeonato Nacional Feminino side SC Braga.

In July 2022, Evy moved to Campeonato Nacional II Divisão side Racing Power on a two-year contract. In her debut season, Pereira played a key role in the club's promotion to the top division, scoring eight goals to their second-division title-winning campaign. On 8 July 2024, She announced her departure from the club.

On 17 July 2024, Turkcell Women's Football Super League club Beşiktaş announced the signing of Evy.

== International career ==
In June 2022, Evy Pereira received her first call-up to the Cape Verde national team for a friendly match against Luxembourg. She made her debut on 19 June 2022, starting in a 1–2 defeat, where she scored Cape Verde's only goal in the 7th minute.

== Career statistics ==
As of match played 26 February 2025

Appearances and goals by national team and year
National team	Year	Apps	Goals
Cape Verde	2022	1	1
Cape Verde	2023	3	2
Cape Verde	2025	2	2
Total		6	5

Scores and results list Cape Verde's goal tally first, score column indicates score after each Pereira goal.

List of international goals scored by Evy Pereira
No.	Date	Venue	Opponent	Score	Result	Competition
1	19 June 2022	Stade Municipal, Bettembourg, Luxembourg	Luxembourg	1–0	1–2	Friendly
2	22 September 2023	Estádio Nacional de Cabo Verde, Praia, Cape Verde	Liberia	2–0	3–0	2024 WAFCON qualifiers
3	26 September 2023	Samuel Kanyon Doe Sports Complex, Monrovia, Liberia	Liberia	1–0	3–2	2024 WAFCON qualifiers
4	26 February 2025	Estádio Nacional de Cabo Verde, Praia, Cape Verde	Guinea	2–0	4–1	2026 WAFCON qualifiers
5	26 February 2025	Estádio Nacional de Cabo Verde, Praia, Cape Verde	Guinea	3–0	4–1	2026 WAFCON qualifiers
