= Cape Verde women's national football team =

Women's national association football team representing Cape Verde

Cape Verde
- Association: Cape Verdean Football Federation
- Confederation: CAF (Africa)
- Sub-confederation: WAFU A (West Africa)
- Head coach: Silvéria Nédio
- Top scorer: Ivânia Moreira (10)
- FIFA code: CPV
First colours	Second colours

FIFA ranking
- Current: 120 ▼1 (16 June 2026)
- Highest: 119 (December 2025)
- Lowest: 134 (June 2023)

First international
- Cape Verde 0–1 Guinea-Bissau (Praia, Cape Verde; 16 November 2018)

Biggest win
- Cape Verde 6–0 Mauritania (Sal, Cape Verde; 24 January 2023)

Biggest defeat
- Nigeria 5–0 Cape Verde (Lagos, Nigeria; 30 November 2023); Morocco 5–0 Cape Verde (Casablanca, Morocco; 21 July 2026)

Women's Africa Cup of Nations
- Appearances: 1 (first in 2026)
- Best result: Group Stage (2026)

The Cape Verde women's national football team (Portuguese: seleção nacional de futebol feminina de Cabo Verde), recognised as Cabo Verde (Kabuverdianu: Kabu Verdi) by FIFA,) represents Cape Verde in international women's association football and is governed by the Cape Verdean Football Federation.

== History ==
=== Background and development ===
Women's football in Africa in general faces several challenges, including limited access to education, poverty amongst women in the wider society, and fundamental inequality present in the society that occasionally allows for female specific human rights abuses. At the same time, if quality female players in Africa are developed, many leave their home countries to seek greater football opportunities in places like Northern Europe or the United States. Funding for women's football in Africa is also an issue: Most of the funding for women's football and for the women's national teams comes from FIFA, not the national football association.

The development of football on a national level in Cape Verde is hindered by several factors, including local definitions of femininity that discourage participation in sport, lack of adequate training, a lack of competitive spirit in matches and during training. There is also a lack of available players, with participation rates having peaked at roughly 350 a few years back to roughly 200 current players. The lack of opportunities to go further with football inside the country also discourages continued participation in the sport.

Cape Verde's FIFA trigramme is CPV. The national association, Cape Verdean Football Federation, was founded in 1982 and became affiliated with FIFA in 1986. Between 1990 and 2010, no football administrators from the country attended FIFA run courses related solely to women's football though some attended courses about both men and women's football. Facilities were built to support football for everyone in 2001 when there was a surge of interest in the sport from women and youth players. In 2004, national football umpire training took place, with six of the twenty-six enrolled participants being women, with the women being expected to referee both men and women's matches. Also that year, there were efforts to create a women's futsal competition in São Vicente. lha do Fogo had a women's futsal league in 2005 that included six teams. In July 2011 on the island of St. Nicholas, the first women's soccer national championship was held in the country with EPIF da Praia being crowned the winners and Ajax de São Nicolau coming in second. The national competition had six teams in its inaugural season including EPIF de São Vicente, Ajax de São Nicolau, EPIF da Praia, Académica do Sal, Académica da Boa Vista e Lém. Costs for the competition were covered by the national association. There were efforts to create the league by 2008. In 2011, a FIFA and the Cape Verdean Football Federation sponsored women's coaching clinic was held in the country. The training was conducted by James Doyen French from Portugal and Francisco Baptista Asselan Khan of Mozambique. The training was conducted to help demonstrate the national federation's commitment to women's football. In 2011, a women's football tournament was held in São Vicente island. Rights to broadcast the 2011 Women's World Cup in the country were bought by African Union of Broadcasting.

Some female Cape Verdan footballers have gone on to play internationally for clubs in places like the Canary Islands with some of the earliest players joining clubs around 2001. Other footballers have played abroad starting in 2004 in the Netherlands, Spain and Luxembourg.

== Team image ==
=== Home stadium ===
The Cape Verde women's national football team plays their home matches on...

== Results and fixtures ==
The following is a list of match results in the last 12 months, as well as any future matches that have been scheduled.

Partial results are shown in parentheses.

Legend

Win Draw Lose Fixture

=== 2025 ===
24 October 2025 2026 WAFCON qualifying	Cape Verde	0–1	Mali	Praia
15:00 UTC−1		Report (FIFA)	C. Dembele 81'	Stadium: Estádio Nacional de Cabo Verde; Referee: Aicha Bit Oumarou (Chad)

28 October 2025 2026 WAFCON qualifying	Mali	2–4	Cape Verde	Bamako
17:00 UTC+0	Kone 55', 88'	Report; Report (FIFA)	Melo 14'; Moreira 17'; Vieira 24'; Pereira 72'	Stadium: Stade du 26 Mars; Referee: Kindédji Edoh (Togo)
Note: Cape Verde won 4–3 on aggregate.'

=== 2026 ===
7 March International Friendly	Morocco	3–0	Cape Verde	Rabat, Morocco
21:00 UTC−1	Benzina 21'; Jraïdi 41'; Mssoudy 45+2'; Redouani (red card) 66'			Stadium: Moulay El Hassan Stadium

29 July 2026 2026 WAFCON GS	Ghana	2–0	Cape Verde	Casablanca
18:00	Boaduwaa 6'; Vieira 54' (o.g.)	Report (FIFA)		Stadium: Moulay Rachid Stadium; Referee: Zouleikha Harmasse (Morocco)

30 July 2026 WAFCON GS	Mali	3−2	Cape Verde	Fez, Morocco
21:00	Koné 29'; F. Niakaté 50'; F. Diarra 79'	Report (FIFA)	Pereira 36'; Kelly 88'	Stadium: Fez Stadium; Referee: Aminata Fullah (Sierra Leone)

6 August 2026 WAFCON GS	Cape Verde	1−1	Cameroon	Casablanca, Morocco
21:00 (UTC+01:00)	Moreira 50'	Report (FIFA)	Mendoua 28'	Stadium: Larbi Zaouli Stadium; Referee: Zakia El Grini (Morocco)

Source :globalsportsarchive

== All-time record ==
As of 26 February 2025
Key

Positive balance (more wins than losses)
Neutral balance (as many wins as losses)
Negative balance (more losses than wins)

The following table shows Cape Verde' all-time official international record per opponent:

Opponent	Pld	W	D	L	GF	GA	GD	W%	Confederation
Gambia	1	1	0	0	2	1	+1	100.00	CAF
Guinea	3	2	1	0	9	3	+6	66.67	CAF
Guinea-Bissau	3	2	0	1	6	2	+4	66.67	CAF
Liberia	3	2	0	1	6	3	+3	66.67	CAF
Luxembourg	1	0	0	1	1	2	−1	00.00	UEFA
Mali	1	0	0	1	0	4	−4	00.00	CAF
Mauritania	1	1	0	0	6	0	+6	100.00	CAF
Nigeria	2	0	0	2	1	7	−6	00.00	CAF
Senegal	4	0	0	4	0	5	−5	00.00	CAF
Sierra Leone	1	0	1	0	0	0	0	00.00	CAF
Total	20	8	2	10	31	27	+4	40.00	—

== Coaching staff ==
=== Current coaching staff ===
As of 28 August 2022

Position	Name
Head coach	(Cape Verde) Silvéria Nédio
Assistant coach	(Cape Verde) Gustavo Pires
Assistant coach	(Cape Verde) Arthur Estrela
Goalkeeping coach	(Cape Verde) Fernando Carvalho
Technical director	Rui Costa
Fitness coach	
Delegation Leader	Vacant

=== Manager history ===
Name	Period	Tournament
(Cape Verde) Luana Siqueira	2018	
(Cape Verde) Silvéria Nédio	2018–present	2020 WAFU Zone A Women's Cup: Fourth Place

== Players ==
=== Current squad ===
- The following players were called up for the 2026 WAFCON matches from 26 July through 16 August 2026. .

Note: All player data is sourced from the official CAF squad list. Club listings correspond to the official registration data provided by CAF and may not reflect recent player transfers prior to the tournament.

No.	Pos.	Player	Date of birth (age)	Club
1	GK	Jacinta Rodrigues	3 August 1992 (aged 33)	(Cape Verdean Football Federation) Fénix Talentos
2	DF	Varsénia da Luz (Captain)	19 March 1992 (aged 34)	(Cape Verdean Football Federation) Fénix Talentos
3	DF	Alivia Kelly	1 December 2001 (aged 24)	(Football Association of the Czech Republic) Slovácko
4	MF	Larissa Melo	12 July 2002 (aged 24)	(Portuguese Football Federation) Clube Albergaria
5	DF	Eleia Vieira "Léia"	3 August 2000 (aged 25)	(Portuguese Football Federation) Real Sport Clube
6	MF	Maísa Cardoso "Grampola"	2 February 1999 (aged 27)	(Portuguese Football Federation) Guia
7	FW	Ivânia Moreira "Vá"	13 May 1993 (aged 33)	(Portuguese Football Federation) Clube Albergaria
8	DF	Romina Rosário "Ró"	14 December 1992 (aged 33)	(Portuguese Football Federation) JuveForce
9	MF	Kleydiana Borges "Diana"	5 October 1995 (aged 30)	(Malta Football Association) Birkirkara
10	MF	Natasha Whanon "Sasha"	3 August 1997 (aged 28)	(Portuguese Football Federation) JuveForce
11	DF	Leonilde Rodrigues "Leo"	21 August 1998 (aged 27)	(Portuguese Football Federation) Clube Albergaria
12	GK	Lara Silva	25 February 2007 (aged 19)	(Portuguese Football Federation) Sporting Club
13	MF	Sylviane Gomes	7 December 2001 (aged 24)	(French Football Federation) Nice
14	FW	Yeiza Rodrigues	15 February 2003 (aged 23)	(Polish Football Association) Medyk Konin
15	DF	Jennifer Santos	10 December 1998 (aged 27)	(Portuguese Football Federation) Estrela da Amadora
16	DF	Leidina Semedo "Leh"	8 September 2005 (aged 20)	(Portuguese Football Federation) Racing Power
17	FW	Eveline Varela "Evy"	27 March 1994 (aged 32)	(Portuguese Football Federation) Valadares de Gaia
18	MF	Alcione Santos	26 June 2001 (aged 25)	(Cape Verdean Football Federation) Fénix Talentos
19	FW	Luriane Tavares	2 July 2007 (aged 19)	(Portuguese Football Federation) Racing Power
20	FW	Irlanda Lopes "Irlas"	6 October 1996 (aged 29)	(Portuguese Football Federation) Vitória
21	FW	Sandra Soares-Martins	25 August 1999 (aged 26)	(The Football Association) London Bees
22	FW	Adriana Semedo "Dri"	30 October 1999 (aged 26)	(Portuguese Football Federation) Porto
23	GK	Luana Gomes	3 October 2005 (aged 20)	(Cape Verdean Football Federation) Vila Nova
24	MF	Dara Monteiro	25 April 2003 (aged 23)	(Portuguese Football Federation) Real Sport Clube
25	MF	Luana Moniz	9 July 2004 (aged 22)	(Portuguese Football Federation) Estrela da Amadora
26	DF	Daniela Lopes "Dani"	4 December 2004 (aged 21)	(Portuguese Football Federation) Estrela da Amadora

=== Recent call-ups ===
The following players have been called up to a Cape Verde squad in the past 12 months.

Pos.	Player	Date of birth (age)	Caps	Goals	Club	Latest call-up
GK	Katia Duarte			0	(Portugal) Amora FC	v. Mali, 28 October 2025
MF	Carolyn Tomar			0	(Cape Verde) Liana FC	v. Mali, 28 October 2025
FW	Melany Fortes		7	2	(Portugal) SC Braga	v. Mali, 28 October 2025

=== Previous squads ===
WAFU Zone A Women's Cup

- 2023 WAFU Zone A Women's Cup squads

== Records ==
*Active players in bold, statistics correct as of 8 September 2021.

=== Most appearances ===
#	Player	Year(s)	Caps

=== Top goalscorers ===
#	Player	Year(s)	Goals	Caps
1	Ivânia Moreira	2018–Present	10	
2	Evy Pereira	2022–Present	5	6
3	Irlanda Lopes	2018–Present	3	15
3	Varsénia da Luz	2018–Present	3	20
4	Kleydiana Borges	2022–Present	2	
4	Melany Fortes	2020–Present	2	7
7	Wendy Silva	2019–Present	1	
7	Jocilene Semedo	2019–	1	
7	Sasha Whannon	2023–Present	1	
7	Joseane Fernandes	2018–Present	1	
7	Maísa Cardoso	2022–Present	1	
7	Alcione Gomes	2022–Present	1	

== Competitive record ==
=== FIFA Women's World Cup ===
FIFA Women's World Cup record
Year	Round	Position	Pld	W	D*	L	GS	GA
(China) 1991	Did not exist							
(Sweden) 1995	Did not exist							
(United States) 1999	Did not exist							
(United States) 2003	Did not exist							
(China) 2007	Did not exist							
(Germany) 2011	Did not exist							
(Canada) 2015	Did not exist							
(France) 2019	Did not exist							
(Australia) (New Zealand) 2023	Did not enter							
(Brazil) 2027	Did not qualify							
**Appearances**	**0/10**	–	–	–	–	–	–	–

=== Olympic Games ===
Summer Olympics record
Year	Round	Position	Pld	W	D*	L	GS	GA
(United States) 1996	did not exist							
(Australia) 2000	did not exist							
(Greece) 2004	did not exist							
(China) 2008	did not exist							
(United Kingdom) 2012	did not exist							
(Brazil) 2016	did not exist							
(Japan) 2020	did not enter							
(France) 2024	did not enter							
(United States) 2028	to be determined							
**Appearances**	**0/7**	–	–	–	–	–	–	–

*Draws include knockout matches decided on penalty kicks.

=== Africa Women Cup of Nations ===
Africa Women Cup of Nations record
Year	Round	Position	Pld	W	D*	L	GS	GA
1991	Did not exist							
1995	Did not exist							
(Nigeria) 1998	Did not exist							
(South Africa) 2000	Did not exist							
(Nigeria) 2002	Did not exist							
(South Africa) 2004	Did not exist							
(Nigeria) 2006	Did not exist							
(Equatorial Guinea) 2008	Did not exist							
(South Africa) 2010	Did not exist							
(Equatorial Guinea) 2012	Did not exist							
(Namibia) 2014	Did not exist							
(Cameroon) 2016	Did not exist							
(Ghana) 2018	Did not exist							
(Morocco) 2022	Did not enter							
(Morocco) 2024	Did not qualify							
(Morocco) 2026	**Group stage**	14th	3	0	1	2	3	6
**Total: 1/14**	**Group stage**	**14th**	**3**	**0**	**1**	**2**	**3**	**6**

=== WAFU Zone A Women's Cup ===
COSAFA Women's Championship record
Year	Round	Position	Pld	W	D*	L	GS	GA
(Sierra Leone) 2020	**Third Place match**	4th	5	1	1	2	3	7
(Cape Verde) 2023	**Final**	2nd	4	3	0	1	12	2
(Mauritania) 2025	Did not enter							
**Appearances**	**Final**	**2nd**	**9**	**4**	**1**	**3**	**15**	**9**

WAFU Zone A Women's Cup History
Season	Round	Opponent	Scores	Result	Venue
(Sierra Leone) 2020	Group Stage	Sierra Leone	0–0	Draw	Bo, Sierra Leone
(Sierra Leone) 2020	Group Stage	Senegal	0–2	Loss	Bo, Sierra Leone
(Sierra Leone) 2020	Group Stage	Guinea	3–0	won	Makeni, Sierra Leone
(Sierra Leone) 2020	Semi-finals	Mali	0–4	loss	Makeni, Sierra Leone
(Sierra Leone) 2020	Third place	Liberia	0–1	loss	Makeni, Sierra Leone
(Cape Verde) 2023	Group Stage	Guinea-Bissau	4–0	won	Sal, Cape Verde
(Cape Verde) 2023	Group Stage	Mauritania	6–0	won	Sal, Cape Verde
(Cape Verde) 2023	Semi-finals	Gambia	2–1	won	Sal, Cape Verde
(Cape Verde) 2023	Final	Senegal	0–1	loss	Sal, Cape Verde

== Honours ==
=== Regional ===
WAFU Zone A Women's Cup

- Runners-up (1): (silver) 2023

== See also ==
- Cape Verde national football team, the men's team
