= Shalma Midje =

Equatoguinean footballer (born 2007)

Personal information
- Full name: Gertrudis Engueme Midje Obiang
- Date of birth: 17 November 2007 (age 18)
- Place of birth: Zumaia, Basque Country, Spain
- Position: Midfielder

Team information
- Current team: Fundación CD Tenerife B

Youth career
- 2020–2021: Zumaiako
- 2021–2023: Real Sociedad

Senior career*
Years	Team	Apps	(Gls)
2023–2024	Real Sociedad C	26	(1)
2024–	Zumaiako	17	(6)

International career^{‡}
2025–	Equatorial Guinea	1	(1)
- * Club domestic league appearances and goals as of 2 February 2025 ‡ National team caps and goals as of 21 February 2025

Gertrudis Engueme Midje Obiang (born 17 November 2007), commonly known as Shalma Midje, is a professional footballer who plays as a midfielder for Tercera Federación club Fundación CD Tenerife B. Born in Spain, she plays for the Equatorial Guinea national team.

== Club career ==
In August 2021, Midje joined Real Sociedad academy from Zumaiako. In summer 2024, she departed from Real Sociedad C and returned to her first club, Zumaiako. She received a tribute from her former club in December.

Midje joined Fundación CD Tenerife B in 2026.

== International career ==
In February 2025, the Spanish-born talent received her first call-up to the Equatorial Guinea senior national team at just 17 years old. Discovered by scouts during vacation the previous year, she was selected to participate in a double-header against Tanzania in the 2026 Women's Africa Cup of Nations qualification. On 20 February 2025, she made her debut as a starter in a 3–1 away defeat to the Twiga Stars, scoring her first goal and Equatorial Guinea's only goal of the match.

== Career statistics ==
=== International ===
As of match played 20 February 2025

Appearances and goals by national team and year
National team	Year	Apps	Goals
Equatorial Guinea	2025	1	1
Total		1	1

Scores and results list Equatorial Guinea's goal tally first, score column indicates score after each Midje goal.

List of international goals scored by Midje
No.	Date	Venue	Opponent	Score	Result	Competition
1	20 February 2025	Azam Complex Stadium, Dar es Salaam, Tanzania	Tanzania	1–0	1–3	2026 WAFCON qualification
