= 2023 WAFU Zone A Women's Cup =

2023 UFOA Zona A Copa Feminina

Tournament details
- Host country: Cape Verde
- City: Espargos
- Dates: 20 January – 1 February 2023
- Teams: 7 (from 1 sub-confederation)
- Venue: 1 (in 1 host city)

Final positions
- Champions: Senegal (2nd title)
- Runners-up: Cape Verde
- Third place: Gambia
- Fourth place: Guinea-Bissau

Tournament statistics
- Matches played: 13
- Goals scored: 44 (3.38 per match)
- Top scorer(s): (Senegal) Hapsatou Malado Diallo (9 goals)
- Best player: (Cape Verde) Ivânia Moreira
- Best goalkeeper: (Senegal) Tening Séné
- Fair play award: Guinea-Bissau

The 2023 WAFU Zone A Women's Cup was the second edition of the WAFU Zone A Women's Cup, an international women's football tournament contested by the women's national association football teams of West Africa zone A organized by the West African Football Union (WAFU). The tournament was hosted by Cape Verde and took place from 20 to 29 January 2023; it was the first major WAFU A tournament to be hosted in Cape Verde. The opening match was contested between Cape Verde and Guinea-Bissau at Estádio Marcelo Leitão, Espargos, Sal Island on 20 January 2023. The final took place on 29 January 2023 at Estádio Marcelo Leitão, Espargos.

Senegal was the defending champions, having won the previous tournament. and they successfully defended their title beating hosts Cape Verde 1–0 with a penalty kick scored by Senegalese captain Korka Fall.

== Participating nations ==
The WAFU Zone A initially announced on 5 January 2023 that 9 countries would participate in the tournament, a record number with all WAFU Zone A members association sending teams. Mauritania marked their debut in the tournament after its absence from the 2020 edition.

On 10 January 2022, Liberia confirmed its non-participation in the tournament citing a lack of funding from the government, thereby reducing the number of participating countries to 8. Two days prior to the tournament start Mali's sports minister confirmed that its country won't be able to participate in the 2nd edition of the tournament citing funding issues as the main reason for their withdrawal.

Team	Appearance	Previous best performance	FIFA ranking December 2022
Cape Verde	2nd	Fourth Place (2020)	NR
Gambia	2nd	Group Stage (2020)	123
Guinea	2nd	Group Stage (2020)	136
Guinea-Bissau	2nd	Group Stage (2020)	171
Mauritania	1st	—	NR
Senegal	2nd	Champions (2020)	84
Sierra Leone	2nd	Group Stage (2020)	138

Did not enter

- Liberia (W; 164)
- Mali (W; 82)

== Venues ==
After the successful hosting of the 2021 CAF Women's Champions League WAFU A Qualifiers in Mindelo and the 2023 WAFU Zone A Schools Football Championship in Santa Cruz, the Cape Verdean Football Federation announced that this time it would host the tournament in Sal. the FCF selected the biggest stadium in Sal to host the tournament.

Sal Island	2023 WAFU Zone A Women's Cup (Cape Verde)
Estádio Marcelo Leitão	2023 WAFU Zone A Women's Cup (Cape Verde)
Capacity: 8,000	2023 WAFU Zone A Women's Cup (Cape Verde)

== Officials ==
these officials were appointed by WAFU A to officiate the tournament.

Referees

- (Burundi) Suavis Iratunga
- (The Gambia) Ngum Fatou
- (Liberia) Sylvina Garnett Welma
- (Mauritania) Yacine Samassa
- (Mali) Aissata Diarra
- (Senegal) Maimouna Danfakha

Assistant referees

- (Cape Verde) Evandra Furtado da Costa Lima
- (The Gambia) Jainaba Manneh
- (Liberia) Hannah Moses
- (Mauritania) Houleye Diba
- (Mali) Mariam Coulibaly
- (Senegal) Tabara Mbodji
- (Sierra Leone) Precious Amara

== Draw ==
The draw for the final tournament was held on 19 January 2023, on the island of Sal. the 7 teams were drawn into two groups one with four teams with the other group with three teams.

the seven teams were allocated into two pots based on the FIFA Women's World Rankings of 9 December 2022. Pot 1 contained hosts Cape Verde (who were automatically assigned to position A1) and Senegal (who were automatically assigned to position B1). Pot 2 contained the rest of the teams.

From the December 2022 FIFA World Rankings
Pot 1	Pot 2
Cape Verde (NR) (hosts); Senegal (84) (title holders)	Gambia (123); Guinea (136); Sierra Leone (138); Guinea-Bissau (171); Mauritania (NR)

== Squads ==
Each team was required by WAFU-UFOA to name a squad of a minimum of 20 players (three of whom must be goalkeepers).

== Group stage ==
Teams in each group will play one another in a round-robin, with the top two teams advancing to the knockout stage.

Tiebreakers

Teams are ranked according to points (3 points for a win, 1 point for a draw, 0 points for a loss), and if tied on points, the following tiebreaking criteria are applied, in the order given, to determine the rankings (Regulations Article 71):

1. Points in head-to-head matches among tied teams;
2. Goal difference in head-to-head matches among tied teams;
3. Goals scored in head-to-head matches among tied teams;
4. If more than two teams are tied, and after applying all head-to-head criteria above, a subset of teams are still tied, all head-to-head criteria above are reapplied exclusively to this subset of teams;
5. Goal difference in all group matches;
6. Goals scored in all group matches;
7. Drawing of lots.

All times are in CVT (UTC-1).

=== Group A ===
Pos	Team	Pld	W	D	L	GF	GA	GD	Pts	Qualification
1	Cape Verde (H)	2	2	0	0	10	0	+10	6	Knockout stage
2	Guinea-Bissau	2	1	0	1	1	4	−3	3	Knockout stage
3	Mauritania	2	0	0	2	0	7	−7	0	

Source: WAFU A
Rules for classification: Group stage tiebreakers
(H) Hosts
20 January 2023
16:00

Cape Verde	4–0	Guinea-Bissau
Moreira 10', 45'; Fernandes 20'; Whannon 55'	Report (FCF); Report (CAF); Report (WAFU A)

Estádio Marcelo Leitão, Espargos
Referee: Ngum Fatou (Gambia)

22 January 2023
16:00

Guinea-Bissau	1–0	Mauritania
Paulo Mendes 55'	Report (FCF); Report (WAFU A)

Estádio Marcelo Leitão, Espargos
Referee: Maimouna Danfakha (Senegal)

24 January 2023
16:00

Mauritania	0–6	Cape Verde
	Report (FCF); Report (WAFU A)	Moreira 7' (pen.), 17', 28', 62', 71'; Borges 59'

Estádio Marcelo Leitão, Espargos
Referee: Ngum Fatou (Gambia)

=== Group B ===
Pos	Team	Pld	W	D	L	GF	GA	GD	Pts	Qualification
1	Senegal	3	3	0	0	12	1	+11	9	Knockout stage
2	Gambia	3	2	0	1	6	5	+1	6	Knockout stage
3	Guinea	3	1	0	2	1	5	−4	3	
4	Sierra Leone	3	0	0	3	1	9	−8	0	

Source: WAFU A
Rules for classification: Group stage tiebreakers
21 January 2023
15:00

Senegal	4–0	Guinea
Diallo 5', 10'; Fall 48'; Niang 57'	Report (FCF); Report (WAFU A)

Estádio Marcelo Leitão, Espargos
21 January 2023
18:00

Sierra Leone	1–4	Gambia
Kabba 62'	Report (FCF); Report (WAFU A)	Jatta 2', 20', 56', 72'

Estádio Marcelo Leitão, Espargos
Referee: Sylvina Garnett (Liberia)

23 January 2023
15:00

Guinea	1–0	Sierra Leone
Diallo 86'	Report (FCF); Report (WAFU A)

Estádio Marcelo Leitão, Espargos
Referee: Yacine Samassa (Mauritania)
23 January 2023
18:00

Gambia	1–4	Senegal
Jatta 45+3' (pen.)	Report (FCF); Report (WAFU A)	Diallo 2', 49', 71', 83'

Estádio Marcelo Leitão, Espargos
Referee: Sylvina Garnett (Liberia)

25 January 2023
15:00

Guinea	0–1	Gambia
	Report (FCF); Report (WAFU A)	Jatta 75'

Estádio Marcelo Leitão, Espargos
25 January 2023
18:00

Sierra Leone	0–4	Senegal
	Report (FCF); Report (WAFU A)	Ndiaye 46', 76'; Diallo 79'; Niang 90+6'

Estádio Marcelo Leitão, Espargos
Referee: Yacine Samassa (Mauritania)

== Knockout stage ==
Semi-finals
27 January – Estádio Marcelo Leitão
Cape Verde	2
Gambia	1
27 January – Estádio Marcelo Leitão
Senegal	4
Guinea-Bissau	0

Final
29 January – Estádio Marcelo Leitão
Cape Verde	0
Senegal	1
Third Place
29 January – Estádio Marcelo Leitão
Gambia	3
Guinea-Bissau	2

=== Semi-finals ===
27 January 2023
15:00

Cape Verde	2–1	Gambia
da Luz 14'; Tavares Cardoso 82'	Report (FCF); Report (WAFU A)	Jatta 66'

Estádio Marcelo Leitão, Espargos
27 January 2023
18:00

Senegal	4–0	Guinea-Bissau
Ndiaye 13'; Diallo 51' (pen.), 68'; Fall 82'	Report (FCF); Report (WAFU A)

Estádio Marcelo Leitão, Espargos
Referee: Aissata Diarra (Mali)

=== Third-place match ===
29 January 2023
15:00

Gambia	3–2	Guinea-Bissau
Buwaro 28', 37'; Jarju 90+1'	Report (FCF); Report (WAFU A)	da Silva 50'; Mendes 90+5'

Estádio Marcelo Leitão, Espargos

=== Final ===
29 January 2023
18:00

Cape Verde	0–1	Senegal
	Report (FCF); Report (WAFU A)	Fall 60' (pen.)

Estádio Marcelo Leitão, Espargos
Referee: Sylvina Garnett (Liberia)

== Statistics ==
=== Goalscorers ===
There were 44 goals scored in 13 matches, for an average of 3.38 goals per match.

9 goals

- (Senegal) Hapsatou Malado Diallo

7 goals

- (Cape Verde) Ivânia Moreira
- (The Gambia) Catherine Jatta

3 goals

- (Senegal) Nguenar Ndiaye
- (Senegal) Korka Fall

2 goals

- (The Gambia) Ola Buwaro
- (Senegal) Jeanne Niang

1 goal

- (Cape Verde) Joseane Fernandes
- (Cape Verde) Sasha Whannon
- (Cape Verde) Kleydiana Borges
- (Cape Verde) Varsénia da Luz
- (Cape Verde) Maísa Tavares Cardoso
- (The Gambia) Kaddy Jarju
- (Guinea) Fatoumata Dédé Diallo
- (Guinea-Bissau) Luísa Paulo Mendes
- (Guinea-Bissau) Suraia da Silva
- (Guinea-Bissau) Júlia Mendes
- (Sierra Leone) Matilda Kabba

=== Discipline ===
A player was automatically suspended for the next match for the following offences:

- Receiving a red card (red card suspensions may be extended for serious offences)
- Receiving two yellow cards in two matches; yellow cards expire after the completion of the quarter-finals (yellow card suspensions are not carried forward to any other future international matches)

The following suspensions were served during the tournament:

Player	Offence(s)	Suspension
(Mauritania) Funmilayo Adiara Adebisi	(yellow card) (yellow-red card) in Group A vs Guinea-Bissau (matchday 2; 22 January)	Group A vs Cape Verde (matchday 3; 24 January)

== Final ranking ==
Pos	Team	Pld	W	D	L	GF	GA	GD	Pts	Final result
1	Senegal	5	5	0	0	17	1	+16	15	Champions
2	Cape Verde	4	3	0	1	12	2	+10	9	Runners-up
3	Gambia	5	3	0	2	10	9	+1	9	Third place
4	Guinea-Bissau	4	1	0	3	3	11	−8	3	Fourth place
5	Guinea	3	1	0	2	1	5	−4	3	Eliminated in group stage
6	Mauritania	2	0	0	2	0	7	−7	0	Eliminated in group stage
7	Sierra Leone	3	0	0	3	1	9	−8	0	Eliminated in group stage

Source: [ WAFU A]

== Controversies ==
=== Liberia withdrawal ===
Liberia's withdrawal from the competition after initially confirming its participation sparked high criticism among Liberians at home, especially Liberia women's National team players who showed a huge disappointment in the government and in the Liberian Football Association. Liberia's women's team's former captain Bantu Jestina Wilson stated that she felt frustrated and disappointed and that there was no lack of funding because the Ministry of youth and sports never supported the team or the women's football in the first place.

== See also ==
- 2023 UNAF Women's Tournament
