= Lassana Cassamá =

Guinea-Bissauan football manager

Personal information
- Place of birth: Guinea-Bissau

Managerial career
- Years: Team
- 201x–: Guinea-Bissau (women's)

Lassana Cassamá is a Guinea-Bissauan professional football manager. He is a coach of the Guinea-Bissau women's national football team.
