= Gambia women's national football team =

Women's national association football team representing Gambia

The Gambia
- Nickname: The Scorpions
- Association: Gambia Football Federation (GFF)
- Confederation: CAF (Africa)
- Sub-confederation: WAFU (West Africa)
- Head coach: Yahya Manneh
- FIFA code: GAM
First colours	Second colours

FIFA ranking
- Current: 134 ▲1 (16 June 2026)
- Highest: 104 (December 2020)
- Lowest: 136 (December 2025)

First international
- Gambia 2–0 Guinea-Bissau (Bakau, Gambia; 16 September 2017)

Biggest win
- Guinea-Bissau 1–4 Gambia (Bissau, Guinea-Bissau; 26 February 2018); Gambia 5–2 Guinea-Bissau (Makeni, Sierra Leone; 28 February 2020); Sierra Leone 1–4 Gambia (Espargos, Cape Verde; 21 January 2023); Sierra Leone 0–3 Gambia (Nouakchott, Mauritania; 22 May 2025)

Biggest defeat
- Cameroon 8–0 Gambia (Yaoundé, Cameroon; 18 February 2022)

The Gambia women's national football team (recognized at The Gambia by FIFA) represents the Gambia in international women's football. It is governed by the Gambia Football Federation. As of December 2019, it has only competed in one major international competition, the 2018 Africa Women Cup of Nations qualification. The Gambia has two youth teams, an under-17 side that has competed in FIFA U-17 Women's World Cup qualifiers, and an under-19 side that withdrew from regional qualifiers for an under-19 World Cup. The development of a national team faces challenges similar to those across Africa, although the national football association has four staff members focusing on women's football.

== History ==
=== The team ===
In 1985, few countries had women's national football teams. While the sport gained popularity worldwide in later decades, the Gambia's national team only played its first game in 2007. That game was not FIFA-recognized.

The Gambian Senior National Team's first appearance at a major event occurred in April 2018 when they lost a 1–2 result at Burkina Faso in the opening round of qualifying for the 2018 Africa Cup of Nations. In the second leg of the fixture, the Gambia produced a 2–1 victory of their own. As the results of both legs were identical, a penalty shoot-out was required to determine which squad would advance. The Gambia converted all five of its penalty kicks, and advanced to the second round of qualifying. The Gambia drew the defending Cup of Nations champions Nigeria as their second round opponent. They failed to score against the Super Falcons, and were eliminated from the tournament with a 0–7 aggregate line.

The country did not have a FIFA-recognised youth national team until 2012, when the Gambia under-17 women's team competed in Confederation of African Football qualifiers for the FIFA U-17 World Cup, to be held in Azerbaijan in September 2012. The Gambia fielded a team of 24 players, narrowed from an initial pool of 49 young women. Two girls from the SOS Children’s Village Bakoteh were chosen as a members of the team. The Gambia first played Sierra Leone in a pair of qualifying matches for the tournament. The Gambia won the first match 3–0 in Banjul, the Gambia's capital. The return match was delayed for 24 hours and played in Makeni. The Gambia beat Sierra Leone 4–3 to qualify for the final round. The Gambia then beat Tunisia 1–0 at home and won 2–1 in the away fixture. Adama Tamba and Awa Demba scored the Gambia's goals. Tunisia's only goal was a Gambian own goal. The win qualified the Gambia for the 2012 Azerbaijan World Cup.

The Gambia also has an Under -19 team that was to play in the 2002 African U-19 Women's Championship. That Gambian squad's first match was to be against Morocco, but the team withdrew from the competition.

=== Background and development ===
The development of women's football in Africa faces several challenges, including limited access to education, poverty amongst women, inequalities and human rights abuses targeting women. Funding is another issue impacting the game in Africa, where most financial assistance comes from FIFA and not national football associations.

Another challenge is the retention of football players. Many women footballers leave the continent to seek greater opportunity in Europe or the United States.

Gambia's national football association was founded in 1952, and became affiliated with FIFA in 1968. Football is the most popular women's sport in the country, and was first played in an organized system in 1998. A national competition was launched in 2007, the same year FIFA started an education course on football for women. Competition was active on both the national and scholastic levels by 2009. There are four staffers dedicated to women's football in the Gambia Football Association, and representation of women on the board is required by the association's charter.

=== Death of Fatim Jawara ===
In September 2016, Fatim Jawara, a member of the national team, left Serrekunda in her homeland the Gambia and crossed the Sahara Desert to Libya. In November 2016, she travelled with others on two boats across the Mediterranean Sea, heading towards the Lampedusa island of Italy. She did this as she sought to smuggle herself into Europe, where the national team was due to play Casa Sports F.C. from Senegal as part of a festival to celebrate women's football. Due to a severe storm, their boats capsized and Jawara drowned at the age of 19, with her family was contacted several days after the tragedy. Lamin Kaba Bajo, President of the Gambia Football Federation, said "We are grieving at the moment as this is a great loss to the national soccer team and the nation."

== Results and fixtures ==
The following is a list of match results in the last 12 months, as well as any future matches that have been scheduled.

Legend

Win Draw Lose Fixture

=== 2025 ===
24 October 2025 2026 WAFCON qualifying	Kenya	3–1	Gambia	Nairobi
16:00 UTC+3	Jereko 12' (pen.); Adhiambo 19'; Opisa 45+2'	Report (FIFA)	Kanteh 2'	Stadium: Nyayo National Stadium; Referee: Aline Guimbang Etong (Cameroon)

28 October 2025 2026 WAFCON qualifying	Gambia	0–1	Kenya	Thiès (Senegal)
16:00 UTC+0		Report (FIFA)	Jereko 51'	Stadium: Stade Lat-Dior
Note: Kenya won 4–1 on aggregate.

== Coaching staff ==
=== Current coaching staff ===
Position	Name	Ref.
Head coach	(The Gambia) Mariama Sowe	

=== Manager history ===
- Bubacarr Jallow (????–2022)
- (The Gambia) Bubacarr Jallow(2022–2023)
- (The Gambia) Yahya Manneh (2023–2024 )
- (The Gambia) Mariama Sowe (2024-)

== Players ==
=== Current squad ===
The following is the squad named for the 2026 Women's Africa Cup of Nations qualification against Kenya, announced in October 2025.

No.	Pos.	Player	Date of birth (age)	Club
1	GK	Mary NF Gomez		(Gambia Football Federation) TMT FC
2	GK	Aminata Gaye		(Gambia Football Federation) Police FC
3	GK	Diminga Mendy		(Gambia Football Federation) Berewuleng FC
4	DF	Wuday Colley		(Gambia Football Federation) Greater Tomorrow FC
5	DF	Bintou Ceesay		(Gambia Football Federation) Police FC
6	DF	Kaddy Sanyang		(Gambia Football Federation) Berewuleng FC
7	MF	Manyima Stevelmans	31 October 2000 (age 25)	(Hellenic Football Federation) AEK
8	DF	Juana Colley		(Gambia Football Federation) Koita FC
9	DF	Fatou Fatty		(Gambia Football Federation) Red Scorpion FC
10	DF	Jarra Jambang		(Gambia Football Federation) TMT FC
11	DF	Metta Sanneh		(Gambia Football Federation) Police FC
12	MF	Mariama Cham		(Senegalese Football Federation) AS Bambey FC
13	FW	Kaddy Jatta		(Gambia Football Federation) Red Scorpion FC
14	MF	Kaddijatou Bayo		(Gambia Football Federation) Red Scorpion FC
15	FW	Kaddijatou Jallow		(Gambia Football Federation) TMT FC
16	FW	Fatoumata Jammeh		(Gambia Football Federation) Red Scorpion FC
17	FW	Mam Drammeh		(Senegalese Football Federation) AS Bambey FC
18	MF	Penda Bah		(Estonian Football Association) Viimsi JK
19	FW	Isatou Jallow		(Gambia Football Federation) Police FC
20	MF	Fatou Kanteh (Captain)	2 July 1997 (age 29)	(Royal Spanish Football Federation) Sevilla
21	DF	Sarah Jargu		(Gambia Football Federation) Berewuleng FC
22	FW	Fatou Sonko		(Gambia Football Federation) Police FC
23	FW	Ola Buwaro		(Russian Football Union) Locomotive Moskva

=== Recent call-ups ===
The following players have been called up to a Gambia squad in the past 12 months.

Pos.	Player	Date of birth (age)	Caps	Goals	Club	Latest call-up -

=== Previous squads ===
WAFU Zone A Women's Cup

- 2023 WAFU Zone A Women's Cup squads

== Records ==
*Active players in bold, statistics correct as of 1 August 2021.

=== Most capped players ===
#	Player	Year(s)	Caps

=== Top goalscorers ===
#	Player	Year(s)	Goals	Caps

== Competitive record ==
=== FIFA Women's World Cup ===
FIFA Women's World Cup record
Year	Result	GP	W	D*	L	GF	GA	GD
(China) 1991	Did not enter							
(Sweden) 1995	Did not enter							
(United States) 1999	Did not enter							
(United States) 2003	Did not enter							
(China) 2007	Did not enter							
(Germany) 2011	Did not enter							
(Canada) 2015	Did not enter							
(France) 2019	Did not qualify							
(Australia) (New Zealand) 2023	Did not qualify							
(Brazil) 2027	Did not qualify							
**Total**	0/10	-	-	-	-	-	-	-

*Draws include knockout matches decided on penalty kicks.

=== Olympic Games ===
Summer Olympics record
Year	Result	GP	W	D*	L	GF	GA	GD
(United States) 1996	Did not enter							
(Australia) 2000	Did not enter							
(Greece) 2004	Did not enter							
(China) 2008	Did not enter							
(United Kingdom) 2012	Did not enter							
(Brazil) 2016	Did not enter							
(Japan) 2021	Did not enter							
(France) 2024	Did not enter							
**Total**	0/8	-	-	-	-	-	-	-

=== Africa Women Cup of Nations ===
Africa Women Cup of Nations record
Year	Result	Matches	Wins	Draws	Losses	GF	GA
1991	Did not enter						
1995	Did not enter						
(Nigeria) 1998	Did not enter						
(South Africa) 2000	Did not enter						
(Nigeria) 2002	Did not enter						
(South Africa) 2004	Did not enter						
(Nigeria) 2006	Did not enter						
(Equatorial Guinea) 2008	Did not enter						
(South Africa) 2010	Did not enter						
(Equatorial Guinea) 2012	Did not enter						
(Namibia) 2014	Did not enter						
(Cameroon) 2016	Did not enter						
(Ghana) 2018	Did not qualify						
2020	Cancelled due to covid						
(Morocco) 2022	Did not qualify						
(Morocco) 2024	Did not qualify						
**Total**	0/13	0	0	0	0	0	0

*Draws include knockout matches decided on penalty kicks.

=== African Games ===
African Games record
Year	Result	Matches	Wins	Draws	Losses	GF	GA
(Nigeria) 2003	Did not enter						
(Algeria) 2007	Did not enter						
(Mozambique) 2011	Did not qualify						
(Republic of the Congo) 2015	Did not qualify						
(Morocco) 2019	Did not qualify						
(Ghana) 2023	Did not qualify						
Total	0/4	0	0	0	0	0	0

=== WAFU Women's Cup record ===
WAFU Zone A Women's Cup
Year	Result	Position	Pld	W	D	L	GF	GA
(Sierra Leone) 2020	Group Stage	5th	3	1	0	2	4	10
Total	Group Stage	1/1	3	0	0	3	1	17

== Honours ==
=== Regional ===
WAFU Zone A Women's Cup

- 3rd Place (1): (bronze) 2023

== All−time record against FIFA recognized nations ==
The list shown below shows the Djibouti national football team all−time international record against opposing nations.
*As of xxxxxx after match against xxxx.

Key

Positive balance (more wins than losses)
Neutral balance (as many wins as losses)
Negative balance (more losses than wins)

Against	Pld	W	D	L	GF	GA	GD	Confederation

=== Record per opponent ===
*As ofxxxxx after match against xxxxx.

Key

Positive balance (more wins than losses)
Neutral balance (as many wins as losses)
Negative balance (more losses than wins)

The following table shows Djibouti's all-time official international record per opponent:

Opponent	Pld	W	D	L	GF	GA	GD	W%	Confederation
Total									—

== See also ==
- Sport in the Gambia
  - Football in the Gambia
    - Women's football in the Gambia
- Gambia national football team, the men's team
- Women's football
