= 2020 WAFU Zone A Women's Cup =

Tournament details
- Host country: Sierra Leone
- Dates: 25 February to 7 March
- Teams: 8 (from 1 sub-confederation)
- Venues: 2 (in 1 host city)

Final positions
- Champions: Senegal (1st title)
- Runners-up: Mali
- Third place: Liberia
- Fourth place: Cape Verde

Tournament statistics
- Matches played: 16
- Goals scored: 44 (2.75 per match)
- Top scorer: (Mali) Agueissa Diarra (6 goals)

The 2020 WAFU Zone A Women's Cup was the maiden edition of the international women's football event for teams from Zone A of the West African Football Union (WAFU). The competition was hosted by Sierra Leone at 2 match venues.7 team out of 8 had participate in this edition, only Mauritania did not participate. Senegal win Mali in the final, Agueissa Diarra was the top scorer with 6 goals.

== Draw ==
The draw was held on 9 February in Sierra Leone. eight of WAFU's Zone A members entered a team (Mauritania did not enter).

== Officials ==
These 16 officials were selected by WAFU to oversee the tournament.

Referees

- (Burkina Faso) Fabienne Yaméogo
- (The Gambia) Isatou Touray
- (Guinea) Aïssatou Kanté
- (Liberia) Sylvina Garnett
- (Mali) Rokiatou Fofana
- (Mauritania) Aissata Boudy Lam
- (Senegal) Mame Coumba Faye
- (Togo) Edoh Kindedji

Assistant referees

- (Benin) Nafissatou Yekini
- (Ivory Coast) Ndeko Edwige Appia
- (The Gambia) Abbie Leesay
- (Guinea) Fantagbe Kaba
- (Mali) Diénéba Dembélé
- (Mauritania) Houleye Diba
- (Senegal) Dié Alsé Sylla
- (Senegal) Fatou Binetou Sène

== Group stage ==
=== Group A ===
Pos	Team	Pld	W	D	L	GF	GA	GD	Pts	Qualification
1	Senegal	3	2	1	0	4	1	+3	7	Advance to semi-finals
2	Cape Verde	3	1	1	1	3	2	+1	4	Advance to semi-finals
3	Sierra Leone (H)	3	0	3	0	1	1	0	3	
4	Guinea	3	0	1	2	0	4	−4	1	

(H) Hosts
25 February 2020
14:00

Sierra Leone	0–0	Cape Verde

Bo Stadium, Bo
25 February 2020
16:30

Guinea	0–1	Senegal
		Diakhaté 18' (pen.)

Bo Stadium, Bo
Referee: Isatou Touray (Gambia)

26 February 2020
14:00

Cape Verde	0–2	Senegal
		Sow 36'; Diop 67'

Bo Stadium, Bo
26 February 2020
16:30

Sierra Leone	0–0	Guinea

Bo Stadium, Bo

1 March 2020
16:00

Sierra Leone	1–1	Senegal
Kamara 61'		Diop 90+2'

Bo Stadium, Bo
1 March 2020
16:00

Cape Verde	3–0	Guinea
Lopes 2', 72', 78'

Wusum Sports Stadium, Makeni

=== Group B ===
Pos	Team	Pld	W	D	L	GF	GA	GD	Pts	Qualification
1	Mali	3	3	0	0	11	0	+11	9	Advance to semi-finals
2	Liberia	3	2	0	1	6	4	+2	6	Advance to semi-finals
3	Gambia	3	1	0	2	6	10	−4	3	
4	Guinea-Bissau	3	0	0	3	2	11	−9	0	

26 February 2020
14:00

Mali	6–0	Gambia
A. Diarra 33' (pen.), 49', 57'; Kone 45', 46'; Sidibe 75'

Wusum Sports Stadium, Makeni
26 February 2020
16:30

Liberia	4–0	Guinea-Bissau
Massaquio 13'; Willie 43'; Kieh 45+1' (pen.); Kikeh 72'

Wusum Sports Stadium, Makeni

28 February 2020
14:00

Mali	3–0	Liberia
Sidibe 31'; B. Diarra 43'; A. Diarra 78'

Wusum Sports Stadium, Makeni
28 February 2020
16:30

Gambia	5–2	Guinea-Bissau
Tamba 7', 48', 66', 77'; Buwuro 88'		Mane 4'; Te 44'

Wusum Sports Stadium, Makeni

2 March 2020
16:00

Guinea-Bissau	0–2	Mali
		Sidibe 60'; A. Diarra 90+'

Bo Stadium, Bo
2 March 2020
16:00

Gambia	1–2	Liberia
Tamba 60'		Sayee 1'; Stewart 14'

Wusum Sports Stadium, Makeni

== Knockout stage ==
=== Semifinals ===
4 March 2020
16:00

Senegal	2–1	Liberia
Ndiaye 18'; Diakhaté 34'	Report	Kpan 62'

Bo Stadium, Bo
4 March 2020
16:00

Mali	4–0	Cape Verde
A. Diarra 31', 41'; Sidibe 56', 87'	Report

Wusum Sports Stadium, Makeni

=== Third place ===
7 March 2020
14:00

Liberia	1–0	Cape Verde
Kieh 59'

Wusum Sports Stadium, Makeni

=== Final ===
7 March 2020
16:30

Senegal	3–0	Mali
Diakhaté 27'; Sow 59'; Balde 69'	Report

Wusum Sports Stadium, Makeni

== Top scorers ==
There have been 44 goals scored in 16 matches, for an average of 2.75 goals per match (as of 11 December 2021). Players highlighted in bold are still active in the competition.

6 goals

- (Mali) Agueissa Diarra

5 goals

- (The Gambia) Adama Tamba

4 goals

- (Mali) Seynebu Sidibe

3 goals

- (Cape Verde) Irlanda Lopes
- (Senegal) Ndeye Awa Diakhaté

2 goals

- (Liberia) Angeline Kieh
- (Mali) Oumou Kone
- (Senegal) Mama Diop
- (Senegal) Mbayang Sow

1 goal

- (Liberia) Lucy Kikeh
- (Liberia) Hawa Kpan
- (Liberia) Lucy Massaquoi
- (Liberia) Kantie Sayee
- (Liberia) Bernice Willie
- (The Gambia) Ola Buwuro
- (Guinea-Bissau) Tchaloda Mane
- (Guinea-Bissau) Veva Te
- (Mali) Binta Diarra
- (Senegal) Haby Balde
- (Senegal) Nguenar Ndiaye
- (Sierra Leone) Rashidatu Kamara

== Links ==
- Official website
