= Sierra Leone women's national football team =

Association football team

Sierra Leone
- Association: Sierra Leone Football Association (SLFA)
- Confederation: CAF (Africa)
- Sub-confederation: WAFU (West Africa)
- Head coach: Ernest Hallowell
- FIFA code: SLE
First colours	Second colours

FIFA ranking
- Current: 152 ▼1 (16 June 2026)
- Highest: 135 (December 2021)
- Lowest: 151 (August – December 2025)

First international
- Sierra Leone 0–9 Nigeria (6 November 1994)

Biggest win
- Sierra Leone 3–1 Guinea (Nouakchott, Mauritania; 24 May 2025)

Biggest defeat
- Sierra Leone 0–9 Nigeria (6 November 1994)

Women's Africa Cup of Nations
- Appearances: 1 (first in 1995)
- Best result: Quarters Final (1995)

The Sierra Leone women's national football team is governed by the Sierra Leone Football Association.

== History ==
Sierra Leone women's national football team did not play its first matches until around 1994 when it participated in the qualification phase of the 1995 FIFA Women's World Cup. In a game in Nigeria on 6 November 1994, Sierra Leone women's national football team lost 0–9 to Nigeria after being down 0–6 at the half. In a game in Freetown on 20 November 1994, it lost 0–2 to Nigeria after being down 0–2 at the half. These 2 games represent half of all games it has played in its history. The team's other 2 games took place during the preliminary rounds of the 2010 Women's Championship tournament in Africa, which was part of the Olympic qualification process, where Sierra Leone lost during the preliminary round once 2–3 to Guinea in Conakry on 7 March 2010 and tied Guinea 1–1 in Freetown on 20 March 2010. Following this match, the team did not play an international match on any level for at least a year and did not participate 2011 All Africa Games. In March 2012, Sierra Leone was ranked the 135th best in the world and the 26th best in Africa. It improved its ranking to 130th best in the world in June 2012 and at still at the bottom of the world rankings alongside 46 other women's national teams. Its best ever rank was 128th, which was in 2010, and its worst ever ranking was 136, which it was ranked in 2011.

=== Background and development ===
Early development of the women's game at the time colonial powers brought football to Sierra Leone and the continent was limited, as colonial powers in the region tended to take concepts of patriarchy and women's participation in sport with them to local cultures that already had similar concepts already embedded in them. Other factors on the continent impact the development of the game, including limited access to education, poverty among women in the wider society, and fundamental inequality present in the society that occasionally allows for female specific human rights abuses. When quality players are developed in Africa, they often leave for greater opportunities elsewhere Continent wide; most of the funding for women's football in a country and for the women's national team comes from FIFA, not the national football association. Future success for women's football in Africa is dependent on improved facilities and access by women to these facilities. Attempting to commercialise the game is not the solution, as demonstrated by the existence of youth and women's football camps held on the continent that have resulted in improved national team performance as players progressed through the system.

The United Nations ranked Sierra Leone 180 out of 187 on their Human Development Index. One of the factors in this world ranking was gender inequality. Football was seen as 1 way of understanding life by watching what happened on the pitch. In 2007, a football administrator from the country is in charge of the women's football committee in the West African Football Union. In 2011, Brazilian women's football superstar Marta visited the country and met with the national team. Her visit was part of the United Nations Development Programme where Marta is a Goodwill Ambassador. In 2011, there was no national women's league in the country. In 2012, Girls Football League was launched by the Craig Bellamy Foundation after a pilot programme in 2010/2012 in Makeni that included 4 teams. Girls participating in the programme are given scholarships to attend, with 93% attending school regularly while involved with the programme, a higher percentage than the national average for female school attendance.

Women are football spectators, watching live games in rural and remote areas of the country. Rights to broadcast the 2011 Women's World Cup in the country were bought by the African Union of Broadcasting and Supersport International. The popularity of the sport is declining in the country for women.

Sierra Leone women's national football team is nicknamed the Sierra Queens.

=== Under-17 team ===
Sierra Leone has a Sierra Leone women's national under-17 football team. They were supposed to compete in the African Women U-17 Championship Qualifying Tournament 2010. Togo won the first round because Sierra Leone withdrew from the competition. They competed in CAF qualifiers for the FIFA U-17 World Cup that will be held in Azerbaijan in September 2012. They did not advance out of their region. The team was supposed to play the Gambia women's national under-17 football team in a qualifying match for the 2012 U-17 Qualifying Tournament. Sierra Leone lost the first leg in Banjul, Gambia 0–3. The return match was delayed for 24 hours. The team's head coach attributed the loss to poor refereeing. The game against Gambia was the country's first junior national international match. The second match was won by Sierra Leone 3–1. Gambia won the first match in 3–0 in a game played in Banjul. The return match was delayed in for 24 hours and played in Makeni. Gambia beat Sierra Leone to qualify for the final round with an aggregate score of 4–3.

The team is coached by Hannah Williams, while Tamba Moses was the assistant coach. Squad members included Cecilia Bangura, Jarriatu Kamara, Hannah Conteh, Haja Kamara, Magret Sesay, Sarah Bangura, Fatmata Turay, Fatmata Mansaray, Kaju Max-Macauley, Aminata Lebbe, Zainab Sesay, Alice Bundor, Adama Sesay, Rashidatu Kamara, Isata Kamara, Wuyiah Muwaid, Nasu Bundor, and Assanatu Jalloh. The cost of travel for the team was paid for by LEOCEM, the country's only cement company. The company's managing director rationalised the decision to pay saying, "We received the request from the SLFA at a very short notice but we decided to help because we want to see female football grow from the grass-roots level and also to meet our corporate social responsibility. We are happy about helping out the female team and we hope they'll eliminate their Gambian counterpart." Members of the under-17 team are drawn from the Airtel Rising Stars tournament.

=== Under-20 team ===
Sierra Leone has a Sierra Leone women's national under-20 football team. They competed in the 2010/2011 FIFA U-20 CAF Women's World Cup qualifying competition. They did not advance to the U20 Women's World Cup. They competed in the preliminary rounds of the 2010 CAF FIFA U20 World Cup. In the preliminary round, they did not have to play as Guiena withdrew from the tournament. In the first round, they were supposed to play Nigeria and withdrew from the tournament. They were to compete in the 2010 African Women U-20 Championship Qualifying tournament against Togo, and Togo earned a walkover win against Sierra Leone. Sierra Leone eventually withdrew from the competition. The announcement was made a week after the under-17 lost 0–3 to Gambia.

== Fixtures ==
The following is a list of match results in the last 12 months, as well as any future matches that have been scheduled.

Legend

Win Draw Lose Fixture

== Coaching staff ==
Updated as 2 /2/2025-

Position	Name
Head coach	Hassan Malik Mansaray

== Managers ==
- Ernest Hallowell(20??-2024)
- Hassan Malik Mansaray(2024-)

== Players ==
=== Current squad ===
The following players have been called up for the 2025 WAFU Zone A Women's Cup from 22 to 31 May 2025 in Mauritania.

No.	Pos.	Player	Date of birth (age)	Club
1	GK	Cecilia Bangura		(Sierra Leone Football Association)
16	GK	Kumba Conteh		(Sierra Leone Football Association) FC Kallon
21	GK	Hannah Juana		(Sierra Leone Football Association) Mogbwemo Queens
3	DF	Juliet Brima		(Sierra Leone Football Association) FC Kallon
4	DF	Kumba Abu		(Sierra Leone Football Association)
5	DF	Mabel Gbongay		(Sierra Leone Football Association) Mogbwemo Queens
11	DF	Rashidatu Aminata Kamara		(Sierra Leone Football Association)
13	DF	Fatmata Foday Kanu		(Sierra Leone Football Association)
15	DF	Juliana Fatmata Mansaray		(Sierra Leone Football Association)
6	MF	Jeneba Koroma	11 May 1999 (age 27)	(Sierra Leone Football Association) Mogbwemo Queens
7	MF	Salamatu Kamara (Captain)	6 July 1999 (age 27)	(Sierra Leone Football Association) Ram Kamara FC
8	MF	Kadiatu Abdulai Kamara		(Sierra Leone Football Association) Ram Kamara FC
10	MF	Sarah Bangura		(Sierra Leone Football Association) FC Kallon
12	MF	Abibatu Dollar Bangura		(Sierra Leone Football Association) Sierra Leone Police
14	MF	Fatmata Turay		(Sierra Leone Football Association) Mogbwemo Queens
9	FW	Kumba Zainab Brima	2 January 2002 (age 24)	(Latvian Football Federation) Riga FC
17	FW	Marian Jumu		(Sierra Leone Football Association) Mena Queens FC
18	FW	Wuyah Mohai	22 November 2001 (age 24)	(Sierra Leone Football Association) Mogbwemo Queens
19	FW	Adama Mansaray		(Sierra Leone Football Association) Ram Kamara FC
20	FW	Marie Bockarie Conteh		(Sierra Leone Football Association) Mena Queens FC

=== Recent call-ups ===
The following players have been called up to a Benin squad in the past 12 months.

Pos.	Player	Date of birth (age)	Caps	Goals	Club	Latest call-up

=== Previous squads ===
WAFU Zone A Women's Cup

- 2023 WAFU Zone A Women's Cup squads

== Competitive record ==
=== FIFA Women's World Cup ===
Year	Round	GP	W	D*	L	GF	GA	GD
(France) 2019	did not enter							
(Australia) (New Zealand) 2023	did not enter							
(Brazil) 2027	to be determined							

=== Olympic Games ===
Year	Round	Pld	W	D*	L	GS	GA	GD
(United States) 1996	did not qualify							
(Australia) 2000	did not qualify							
(Greece) 2004	did not qualify							
(China) 2008	did not qualify							
(United Kingdom) 2012	did not qualify							
(Brazil) 2016	did not qualify							
(Japan) 2020	did not qualify							
(France) 2024	did not qualify							

*Draws include knockout matches decided on penalty kicks.

=== African Games ===
Year	Round	Matches	Wins	Draws	Losses	GF	GA
(Nigeria) 2003	did not enter						
(Algeria) 2007	did not enter						
(Mozambique) 2011	did not qualify						
(Republic of the Congo) 2015	did not qualify						
(Morocco) 2019	did not qualify						
(Ghana) 2023	did not qualify						

=== Africa Women Cup of Nations ===
Year	Round	GP	W	D*	L	GS	GA	GD
(Equatorial Guinea) 2008 to 2012	did not enter							
(Namibia) 2014	Withdrew							
(Cameroon) 2016 to (Ghana) 2018	did not enter							
(Morocco) 2022	did not qualify							
(Morocco) 2024	Did not enter							

*Draws include knockout matches decided on penalty kicks.

=== WAFU Women's Cup ===
Year	Round	Position	Pld	W	D	L	GF	GA
(Sierra Leone) 2020	Group stage	6	3	0	3	0	1	1
(Cape Verde) 2023	Group stage	7	3	0	0	3	1	9
