= Wusum Sports Stadium =

Coordinates: 8.89301°N 12.04443°W

Wusum Sports Stadium is a 5,000 capacity soccer stadium based in Makeni, Sierra Leone. It was built in the 1970s by the All People's Congress (APC) and the grandstands were renovated in 1994, costing over Le10 million. The stadium is mostly used for football matches and is the home stadium of the Wusum Stars of Bombali.

The stadium has been used for political and cultural events as well as a sports venue. On November 18, 1996, then-president Tejan Kabbah spoke at Wusum Stadium in his first visit to Makeni. In 2002, Kabbah travelled again to the stadium to commemorate the end of the Sierra Leone Civil War in 2002 for a symbolic arms-burning with Issa Sesay. During the war, inter-denominational prayer services were held in the stadium to pray for a swift end to the war. On April 17, 2009, the ruling political party in Sierra Leone the All People's Congress (APC] held their party convention at the Wusum stadium. The president of Sierra Leone Ernest Bai Koroma was among those in attendance. John Oponjo Benjamin, the leader of the main opposition, the Sierra Leone People's Party was attendance as well as Charles Margai, the leader of the PMDC the third major political party in Sierra Leone
