= Estádio Nacional de Cabo Verde =

Multi-purpose stadium in Praia, Cape Verde

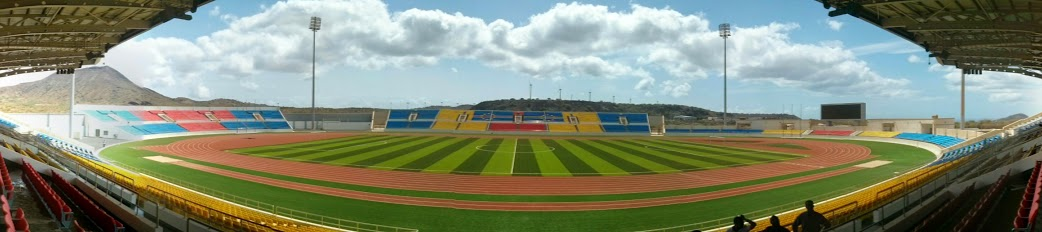
- Interactive map of Estádio Nacional de Cabo Verde
- Full name: Estádio Nacional de Cabo Verde
- Location: Monte Vaca; Achada São Filipe; Praia, Cape Verde
- Coordinates: 14°58′32″N 23°31′50″W
- Owner: State of Cape Verde
- Operator: Commission of Stadium Administration
- Capacity: 15,000
- Surface: Artificial turf, Track & field
- Field size: 100 m^{2}

Construction
- Built: 2010
- Opened: 2014
- Cost: 1.4 billion CVE (€12.7 million)
- General contractor: Top International Engineering Corporation

Tenant
- Cape Verde national football team (2014-present)

Estádio Nacional de Cabo Verde is a multi-purpose stadium in Praia, Cape Verde. Used for football matches, it is home to the Cape Verde national football team. The stadium has an announced capacity of 15,000 people. It is owned by the State of Cape Verde, and operated by an appointed Commission of Stadium Administration.

== History ==
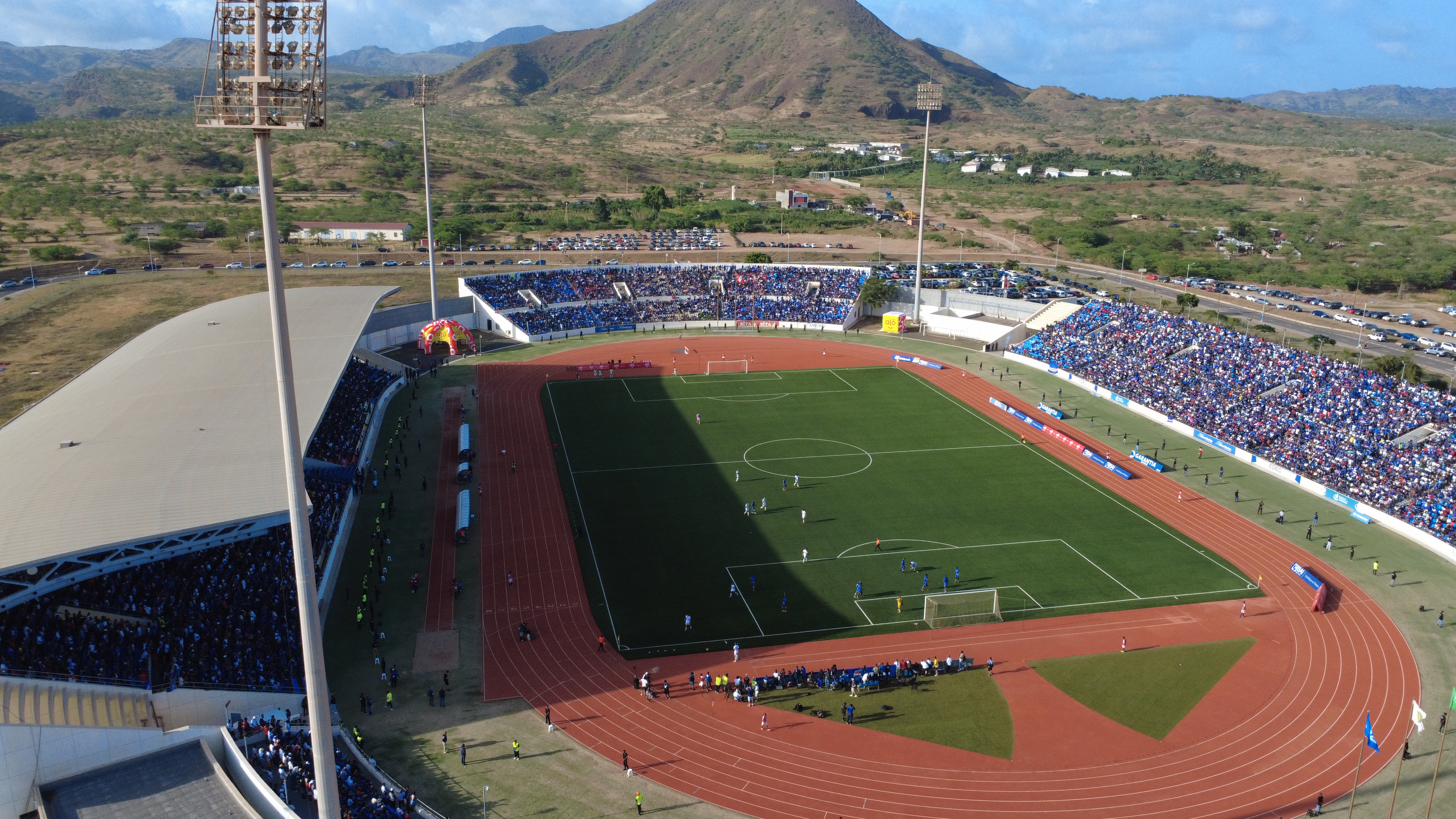
The stadium during a match between Cabo Verde and Eswatini on October 13, 2025 that confirmed the first Cabo Verde World Cup qualification.

The Estádio Nacional de Cabo Verde was funded by the government of the People's Republic of China as a part of their stadium diplomacy policy in Africa, the building started in October 2010, due to be completed in June 2012. A 15-month delay, due to a change aimed at increasing the number of seats from 10,000 to 15,000, moved the planned inauguration date to October 2013. Eventually the stadium was opened in August 2014. It was opened with a ceremony celebrating traditional Cape Verdean and Chinese sports, with the Chinese ambassador to Cape Verde, Su Jian, ceremonially handing over the keys to the stadium. The stadium cost $15 million to construct. In 2024, the Cape Verdean and Chinese governments signed an agreement that China would continue to provide technical assistance for the stadium as well as the new Cape Verde Presidential Palace.

Following the death of Brazilian footballer Pelé, in January 2023 the Prime Minister announced his intention of renaming the stadium as “Estádio Pelé” in tribute. This came after the President of FIFA, Gianni Infantino had called for every country in the world to have a stadium named after Pelé. However, due to objections from local Cape Verdeans on the grounds that Pelé was not from Cape Verde and that he had no links to the country, the proposal was not carried out.
