= Guinea-Bissau women's national football team =

Women's national association football team representing Guinea-Bissau

Guinea-Bissau
- Association: Football Federation of Guinea-Bissau
- Confederation: CAF (Africa)
- Sub-confederation: WAFU (West Africa)
- Head coach: Romão dos Santos
- FIFA code: GNB
First colours	Second colours

FIFA ranking
- Current: 178 (21 April 2026)
- Highest: 129 (December 2006)
- Lowest: 178 (December 2025)

First international
- Guinea-Bissau 1–1 Guinea (Bissau, Guinea-Bissau; 28 October 2006)

Biggest win
- Cape Verde 0–1 Guinea-Bissau (Praia, Cape Verde; 16 November 2018); Guinea-Bissau 1–0 Mauritania (Bissau, Guinea-Bissau; 20 October 2021); Mauritania 0–1 Guinea-Bissau (Nouakchott, Mauritania; 26 October 2021); Guinea-Bissau 1–0 Mauritania (Espargos, Cape Verde; 22 January 2023)

Biggest defeat
- Guinea-Bissau 0–6 Burkina Faso (Bissau, Guinea-Bissau; 16 February 2022)

World Cup
- Appearances: 0

Olympic Games
- Appearances: 0

African Women's Championship
- Appearances: 0

The Guinea-Bissau women's national football team represents Guinea-Bissau in international women's football and is governed by the Football Federation of Guinea-Bissau. It has played in two FIFA-recognised matches, both in 2006 against Guinea. The country also has a national under-17 side which participated in the 2012 Confederation of African Football qualifiers for the FIFA U-17 Women's World Cup. Football is the most popular women's sport in the country. A women's football programme was established in 2004, followed by the creation of a women's national league.

== History ==
In 1985, few countries had women's national football teams. While the sport gained popularity worldwide in the ensuing years, Guinea-Bissau's team only began playing more than two decades later. By the end of 2006, the team had played in two FIFA-recognised matches. The first was on 28 October 2006 against Guinea in Bissau, which ended in a 1–1 tie after Guinea-Bissau led 1–0 at half-time. On 12 November 2006, the team played in their second FIFA-recognised match in Conakry, where Guinea-Bissau lost to Guinea 1–3. At the time, the team held three training sessions a week. The team has not participated in some of the major international and regional football competitions, including the Women's World Cup, the 2010 African Women's Championship and the 2011 All-Africa Games.

The team's average FIFA world ranking since 2006 is 119th. Its highest-ever ranking was 92nd in December 2009, and its lowest ranking was 144th in December 2007. Guinea-Bissau's best-ever rise in the rankings came in March 2008, when the team climbed 23 places compared to its previous FIFA ranking. In March 2012, the team was ranked the 135th in the world by FIFA and 30th in the Confederation of African Football (CAF). In June 2012, they moved up five spots to 130th in the world but fell to 33rd in Africa.

Guinea-Bissau has a FIFA-recognised under-17 football team, which was established in 2006 but did not play any matches that year. The team competed in the CAF qualifiers for the FIFA U-17 World Cup to be held in Azerbaijan in September 2012. They did not advance beyond regional qualifiers.

=== Background and development ===
The development of women's football in Africa faces several challenges, including limited access to education, poverty amongst women, inequalities and human rights abuses targeting women. Many quality football players leave to seek greater opportunities in Europe or the United States. Funding for women's football in Africa is also an issue with most of the financial assistance for women's football coming from FIFA, and not the national football associations.

Guinea-Bissau won its independence in 1974, the same year its national football federation, Football Federation of Guinea-Bissau, was founded. The federation became a FIFA affiliate in 1986. Women's football is provided for in the constitution of the Football Federation of Guinea-Bissau, and the organisation has four full-time staff members focusing on it.

Football is the country's most popular sport for women and is supported by football programmes in schools. A national women's football programme was established in 2004. By 2006, the country had 80 total football clubs, five of which were mixed and three of which were for women only. There were 380 registered female players, and a women's team played in a national football championship. Three years later, there were 24 active women's teams in Guinea-Bissau.

== Results and fixtures ==
The following is a list of match results in the last 12 months, as well as any future matches that have been scheduled.

Legend

Win Draw Lose Fixture

== Coaching staff ==
Position	Name	Ref.
Head coach	(Guinea-Bissau) Romão dos Santos	

== Managers ==
- (Guinea-Bissau) Lassana Cassamá(???–2021)
- (Guinea-Bissau) Romão dos Santos(2021–202?)
- (Guinea-Bissau) João Domingos(202?-present)

== Players ==
=== Current squad ===
- The following list is the final squad for 2025 WAFU Zone A Women's Cup announced on 13 May 2025
- Caps and goals accurate up to and including 30 October 2021.

No.	Pos.	Player	Date of birth (age)	Club
	GK	Adji Saco		(Football Federation of Guinea-Bissau) Fidjus di Bideras TCB
	GK	Lira Brandão Nhaga		(Football Federation of Guinea-Bissau) Fidjus di Bideras TCB
	DF	Fatumata Zacarias Bá		(Football Federation of Guinea-Bissau) SB Benfica
	DF	Sivetilana Salvador Mandeck		(Football Federation of Guinea-Bissau) Fidjus di Bideras TCB
	DF	Pasfan Nhaga		(Football Federation of Guinea-Bissau) Fidjus di Bideras TCB
	DF	Adama Sissé		(Football Federation of Guinea-Bissau) SB Benfica
	DF	Binta Ansumane Mané		(Football Federation of Guinea-Bissau) Sporting Clube Bissau
	DF	Latifa Fati Gomes Sarr		(Football Federation of Guinea-Bissau) Fidjus di Bideras TCB
	DF	Julia Mendes		(Football Federation of Guinea-Bissau) SB Benfica
	MF	Luisa Paulo Mendes		(Football Federation of Guinea-Bissau) Fidjus di Bideras TCB
	MF	Gadi da Silva Varela		(Football Federation of Guinea-Bissau) SB Benfica
	MF	Anhés Djeme		(Football Federation of Guinea-Bissau) Fidjus di Bideras TCB
	MF	Ami Samba N'Dong		(Football Federation of Guinea-Bissau) Fidjus di Bideras TCB
	MF	Teresa Luis Sambu		(Football Federation of Guinea-Bissau) SB Benfica
	MF	Suraia da Silva		(Football Federation of Guinea-Bissau) Fidjus di Bideras TCB
	MF	Julieta Pereira		(Football Federation of Guinea-Bissau) Sporting Clube Bissau
	FW	Flavia Ebatomog Alfredo		(Football Federation of Guinea-Bissau) FC Canchungo
11	FW	Julieta Iala		(Football Federation of Guinea-Bissau) Fidjus di Bideras TCB
	FW	Fidélia da Costa		(Football Federation of Guinea-Bissau) SB Benfica
	FW	Nandinha Pedro Adjutubebe		(Football Federation of Guinea-Bissau) GDR Quelélé

=== Recent call-ups ===
The following players have been called up to a Guinea-Bissau squad in the past 12 months.

Pos.	Player	Date of birth (age)	Caps	Goals	Club	Latest call-up

=== Previous squads ===
WAFU Zone A Women's Cup

- 2023 WAFU Zone A Women's Cup squads

== Records ==
- Active players in **bold**, statistics correct as of 2020.

=== Most capped players ===
#	Player	Year(s)	Caps

=== Top goalscorers ===
#	Player	Year(s)	Goals	Caps

== Competitive record ==
=== FIFA Women's World Cup ===
FIFA Women's World Cup record
Year	Result	Matches	Wins	Draws	Losses	GF	GA
(China) 1991	did not enter						
(Sweden) 1995	did not enter						
(United States) 1999	did not enter						
(United States) 2003	did not enter						
(China) 2007	did not enter						
(Germany) 2011	did not enter						
(Canada) 2015	did not qualify						
(France) 2019	did not qualify						
(Australia) (New Zealand) 2023	did not qualify						
(Brazil) 2027	to be determined						
**Total**	0/10	0	0	0	0	0	0

=== Olympic Games ===
Summer Olympics record
Year	Result	Pld	W	D*	L	GS	GA	GD
(United States) 1996	did not qualify							
(Australia) 2000	did not qualify							
(Greece) 2004	did not qualify							
(China) 2008	did not qualify							
(United Kingdom) 2012	did not qualify							
(Brazil) 2016	did not qualify							
(Japan) 2020	did not qualify							
(France) 2024	did not qualify							
Total	0/8	0	0	0	0	0	0	0

*Draws include knockout matches decided on penalty kicks.

=== African Games ===
African Games record
Year	Result	Matches	Wins	Draws	Losses	GF	GA
(Nigeria) 2003	Did not enter						
(Algeria) 2007	Did not enter						
(Mozambique) 2011	Did not qualify						
(Republic of the Congo) 2015	Did not qualify						
(Morocco) 2019	Did not qualify						
(Ghana) 2023	Did not qualify						
Total	0/4	0	0	0	0	0	0

=== Africa Women Cup of Nations record ===
Africa Women Cup of Nations record
Year	Round	GP	W	D*	L	GS	GA	GD
1991 to (Nigeria) 2006	did not exist							
(Equatorial Guinea) 2008 to 2012	did not enter							
(Namibia) 2014	Withdrew							
(Cameroon) 2016 to (Ghana) 2018	did not enter							
2020	Cancelled due to COVID-19 pandemic in Africa							
(Morocco) 2022	Did not qualify							
(Morocco) 2024	Did not qualify							
**Total**	0/7	0	0	0	0	0	0	0

*Draws include knockout matches decided on penalty kicks.

=== WAFU Women's Cup record ===
WAFU Zone A Women's Cup
Year	Result	Position	Pld	W	D	L	GF	GA
(Sierra Leone) 2020	Group stage	7th	3	0	0	3	2	11
Total	Group Stage	1/1	3	0	0	3	1	17

== All−time record against FIFA recognized nations ==
The list shown below shows the Djibouti national football team all−time international record against opposing nations.
*As of xxxxxx after match against xxxx.

Key

Positive balance (more wins than losses)
Neutral balance (as many wins as losses)
Negative balance (more losses than wins)

Against	Pld	W	D	L	GF	GA	GD	Confederation

=== Record per opponent ===
*As ofxxxxx after match against xxxxx.

Key

Positive balance (more wins than losses)
Neutral balance (as many wins as losses)
Negative balance (more losses than wins)

The following table shows Djibouti's all-time official international record per opponent:

Opponent	Pld	W	D	L	GF	GA	GD	W%	Confederation
Total									—

== See also ==
- Sport in Guinea-Bissau
  - Football in Guinea-Bissau
    - Women's football in Guinea-Bissau
