= Guinea women's national football team =

Women's national association football team representing Guinea

Guinea
- Nickname(s): Syli National (National Elephants)
- Association: Guinean Football Federation
- Confederation: CAF
- Sub-confederation: WAFU (West Africa)
- Head coach: Sékou Tidiane Kaba
- Captain: Maîmouna Camara
- FIFA code: GUI
First colours	Second colours

FIFA ranking
- Current: 143 ▼1 (16 June 2026)
- Highest: 90 (June 2009)
- Lowest: 144 (March 2025; December 2025)

First international
- Nigeria 3–0 Guinea (Nigeria, 4 May 1991)

Biggest win
- Guinea 8–0 Mauritius (Conakry, Guinea; 21 September 2023)

Biggest defeat
- Guinea 0–13 Ghana (Conakry, Guinea; 11 July 2004)

Women's Africa Cup of Nations
- Appearances: 1 (first in 1991)
- Best result: Semi-Final (1991)

The Guinea women's national football team represents Guinea in international women's football. It is governed by the Guinean Football Federation.

== History ==
The Guinea women's national team played their first international match against Nigeria on 4 May 1991 in a Women's Football World Cup qualifying match. The match ended in a 3–0 defeat.

== Results and fixtures ==
The following is a list of match results in the last 12 months, as well as any future matches that have been scheduled.

Legend

Win Draw Lose Fixture

== Coaching staff ==
=== Current coaching staff ===
update : 17/12/2024

Position	Name	Ref.
Head coach	Kaman Camara	

=== Manager history ===
- Sékou Tidiane Kaba(20??–2024)
- Kaman Camara(2024–present)

== Players ==
=== Current squad ===
- The following is the squad called up for the 2025 WAFU Zone A Women's Cup from 18 to 31 May 2025.
- Caps and goals accurate up to and including 30 October 2021.

No.	Pos.	Player	Date of birth (age)	Club
1	GK	Sona Camara	6 October 2006 (age 20)	(Guinean Football Federation) Espoir Yimbaya
16	GK	Kadiatou Bangoura	10 October 2009 (age 17)	(Guinean Football Federation) Samgbarala
2	DF	Fatoumata Camara	27 October 2005 (age 20)	(Guinean Football Federation) Horoya AC
3	DF	Damayé Camara	5 November 2000 (age 25)	(Saudi Arabian Football Federation) Abha Club
5	DF	Mariama Diallo	30 May 2008 (age 18)	(Guinean Football Federation) Espoir Yimbaya
13	DF	Mamaïssata Camara	9 May 2000 (age 26)	(Saudi Arabian Football Federation) Abha Club
24	DF	Djomgbé Doussou Camara	5 November 2004 (age 21)	(Guinean Football Federation) C.O. Ratoma
25	DF	Saran Condé	30 December 1998 (age 27)	(Sierra Leone Football Association) Sierra Leone Police
6	MF	Aminata Camara (Captain)	13 November 2003 (age 22)	(Royal Moroccan Football Federation) FUS Rabat
8	MF	M'balia Camara	15 October 2007 (age 18)	(Guinean Football Federation) AS Bolonta
10	MF	Fatoumata Yaya Samoura	6 March 2005 (age 21)	(Sierra Leone Football Association) Ram Kamara FC
15	MF	Nana Camara	12 December 2005 (age 20)	(Guinean Football Federation) Galaxie FC
7	FW	Mariama Soumah	23 March 2008 (age 18)	(Guinean Football Federation) Samgbarala
9	FW	Fanta Danda Camara	5 February 2002 (age 24)	(Saudi Arabian Football Federation) Abha Club
11	FW	Fanta Daouda Nabé	20 March 2007 (age 19)	(Sierra Leone Football Association) Kallon FC
12	FW	Mariama Harouna Yattara	12 February 2006 (age 20)	(Guinean Football Federation) Samgbarala
14	FW	Nimatoulaye Diallo	14 August 2004 (age 22)	(Guinean Football Federation) Espoir Yimbaya
20	FW	Fatoumata Dédé Diallo	27 May 2004 (age 22)	(Guinean Football Federation) C.O. Ratoma
26	FW	Aïssatou Diallo	2 October 2005 (age 21)	(Guinean Football Federation) AS Bolonta
28	FW	Kany Sidbé	2 February 2004 (age 22)	(Guinean Football Federation) AS Bolonta

=== Recent call-ups ===
The following players have been called up to a Guinea squad in the past 12 months.

Pos.	Player	Date of birth (age)	Caps	Goals	Club	Latest call-up

=== Previous squads ===
WAFU Zone A Women's Cup

- 2023 WAFU Zone A Women's Cup squads

== Records ==
- Active players in **bold**, statistics correct **as of 2020**.

=== Most capped players ===
#	Player	Year(s)	Caps

=== Top goalscorers ===
#	Player	Year(s)	Goals	Caps

== Competitive record ==
=== FIFA Women's World Cup ===
FIFA Women's World Cup record									Qualification record					
Year	Result	Position	Pld	W	D	L	GF	GA	Pld	W	D	L	GF	GA
(China) 1991	Did not qualify								2	0	0	2	0	7
(Sweden) 1995	Withdrew								–	–	–	–	–	–
(United States) 1999	Did not qualify								2	0	0	2	0	19
(United States) 2003	Did not enter								–	–	–	–	–	–
(China) 2007	Did not qualify								2	0	0	2	1	12
(Germany) 2011	Did not qualify								4	2	1	1	6	6
(Canada) 2015	Did not enter								–	–	–	–	–	–
(France) 2019	Did not enter								–	–	–	–	–	–
(Australia) (New Zealand) 2023	Did not qualify								2	0	1	2	2	4
(Brazil) 2027	To be determined								To be determined					
Total	–	–	–	–	–	–	–	–	12	2	2	9	9	48

=== Olympic Games ===
Summer Olympics record									Qualification record					
Year	Result	Position	Pld	W	D	L	GF	GA	Pld	W	D	L	GF	GA
(United States) 1996	Ineligible								–	–	–	–	–	–
(Australia) 2000	Ineligible								–	–	–	–	–	–
(Greece) 2004	Did not enter								–	–	–	–	–	–
(China) 2008	Did not qualify								3	1	1	1	5	8
(United Kingdom) 2012	Did not qualify								2	0	0	2	1	7
(Brazil) 2016	Did not enter								–	–	–	–	–	–
(Japan) 2021	Did not enter								–	–	–	–	–	–
(France) 2024	Did not qualify								2	0	0	2	0	7
Total	–	–	–	–	–	–	–	–	7	1	1	5	6	22

=== Africa Women Cup of Nations ===
Africa Women Cup of Nations record									Qualification record					
Year	Result	Position	Pld	W	D	L	GF	GA	Pld	W	D	L	GF	GA
1991	Semi-finals	3rd	2	0	0	2	0	7	Invitational Tournament					
1995	Withdrew								Invitational Tournament					
(Nigeria) 1998	Did not qualify								2	0	0	2	0	19
(South Africa) 2000	Did not enter								–	–	–	–	–	–
(Nigeria) 2002	Did not enter								–	–	–	–	–	–
(South Africa) 2004	Did not qualify								2	0	0	2	0	22
(Nigeria) 2006	Did not qualify								2	0	0	2	1	12
(Equatorial Guinea) 2008	Did not qualify								2	0	0	2	0	11
(South Africa) 2010	Did not qualify								4	2	1	1	6	6
(Equatorial Guinea) 2012	Did not qualify								2	0	0	2	1	10
(Namibia) 2014	Did not enter								–	–	–	–	–	–
(Cameroon) 2016	Did not qualify								2	1	0	1	1	1
(Ghana) 2018	Did not enter								–	–	–	–	–	–
2020	Cancelled due to covid								–	–	–	–	–	–
(Morocco) 2022	Did Not qualify								–	–	–	–	–	–
(Morocco) 2024	Did not qualify													
Total	1/13	23rd	2	0	0	2	0	7	16	3	1	12	9	81

=== African Games ===
African Games record									Qualification record					
Year	Result	Position	Pld	W	D	L	GF	GA	Pld	W	D	L	GF	GA
(Nigeria) 2003	Did not enter								No Qualifying Process					
(Algeria) 2007	Did not enter								–	–	–	–	–	–
(Mozambique) 2011	Qualified But Withdrew								0	0	0	0	0	0
(Republic of the Congo) 2015	Did not enter								–	–	–	–	–	–
(Morocco) 2019	Did not qualify													
Total	–	–	–	–	–	–	–	–	–	–	–	–	–	–

=== WAFU Women's Cup record ===
WAFU Zone A Women's Cup
Year	Result	Position	Pld	W	D	L	GF	GA
(Sierra Leone) 2020	Group stage	7th	3	0	1	2	0	4
(Cape Verde) 2023	Groupe stage	5	3	1	0	2	1	5
Total	Group Stage	2/2	6	1	0	5	1	17

== See also ==
- Sports in Guinea
- Football in Guinea
- Women's football in Guinea
- Guinean Football Federation
- Guinea women's national under-20 football team
- Guinea women's national under-17 football team
