= Senegal women's national football team results =

This article lists the results and fixtures for the Senegal women's national football team.

Nicknamed the "Lionesses of Teranga" (French: Les Lionnes de la Teranga), mirroring the moniker of the men's team, the side represents Senegal in international women's association football. It is governed by the Senegalese Football Federation and competes under the Confederation of African Football (CAF) and the West African Football Union (WAFU).

Established in the early 2000s, the team entered its first continental qualification campaign in the 2002 African Women's Championship. Initially drawn against Guinea-Bissau in the first round, Senegal advanced automatically after their opponents withdrew. The team made its official international debut on 22 September 2002 in the second round, suffering a 0–3 defeat to Ghana in Dakar. The team recorded its first victory during the 2006 African Women's Championship qualifiers with a 4–0 win over the Central African Republic. In the next round, they went on to defeat Guinea 7–0 in Dakar, their largest win to date. In contrast, the team endured its largest defeat on 29 October 2024, falling 7–0 to the Moroccan Lionesses in a friendly. As of 12 June 2025, the team is ranked 81st in the FIFA Women's World Ranking.

== Record per opponent ==
Key

Positive balance (more wins than losses)
Neutral balance (as many wins as losses)
Negative balance (more losses than wins)

The following table shows Senegal's all-time official international record per opponent:

Opponent	Pld	W	D	L	GF	GA	GD	PPG	Confederation	Last
Algeria	10	6	0	4	19	14	+5	1.80	CAF	2025
Burkina Faso	1	1	0	0	1	0	+1	3.00	CAF	2022
Cameroon	4	0	2	2	3	5	−2	0.50	CAF	2023
Cape Verde	4	4	0	0	5	0	+5	3.00	CAF	2023
Central African Republic	1	1	0	0	4	0	+4	3.00	CAF	2006
DR Congo	6	4	0	2	9	4	+5	2.00	CAF	2025
Egypt	4	1	2	1	5	2	+3	1.25	CAF	2023
Equatorial Guinea	1	0	0	1	0	5	−5	0.00	CAF	2012
Gambia	4	4	0	0	17	5	+12	3.00	CAF	2025
Ghana	10	1	0	9	2	20	−18	0.30	CAF	2025
Guinea	7	6	0	1	20	3	+17	2.57	CAF	2025
Guinea-Bissau	2	2	0	0	7	0	+7	3.00	CAF	2023
Haiti	1	0	0	1	0	4	−4	0.00	CONCACAF	2023
Ivory Coast	6	0	2	4	5	18	−13	0.33	CAF	2019
Liberia	4	4	0	0	11	2	+9	3.00	CAF	2025
Mali	6	3	0	3	8	4	+4	1.50	CAF	2022
Morocco	10	2	3	5	4	14	−10	0.90	CAF	2025
Mozambique	2	1	1	0	3	2	+1	2.00	CAF	2023
Nigeria	5	0	1	4	4	18	−14	0.20	CAF	2018
Sierra Leone	4	1	2	1	6	3	+3	1.25	CAF	2025
South Africa	3	0	1	2	1	4	−3	0.33	CAF	2024
Tanzania	1	0	1	0	1	1	±0	1.00	CAF	2024
Thailand	1	0	1	0	1	1	±0	1.00	AFC	2023
Togo	2	1	0	1	7	2	+5	1.50	CAF	2019
Tunisia	4	2	2	0	5	2	+3	2.00	CAF	2023
Uganda	1	1	0	0	2	0	+2	3.00	CAF	2022
Zambia	2	0	1	1	3	4	−1	0.50	CAF	2025
Total	106	45	19	42	153	137	+16	1.45	—	

Last update : Senegal v Morocco, 12 July 2025

== Results ==
This section details the all-time results of the Senegal women's national team against other national teams that are members of FIFA.

=== 2002 ===
22 September 2002 African Championship qualification	Senegal	0–3	Ghana	Dakar, Senegal
	Bineta Sylia (yellow card) 73'	Report	Amoah-Tetteh 24', 56'; Darku 29'; Ofori (yellow card) 52'	Stadium: Stade Iba Mar Diop; Referee: Xonam Agboyi (Togo)

12 October 2002 African Championship qualification	Ghana	3–1	Senegal	Kumasi, Ghana
	Sheila Okah 30'; Joyce Ohenewaa 51', 67'; Ibrahim (yellow card) 78'	Report	Penda Gueye (yellow card) 31'; Absah Gueye 81'	Stadium: Baba Yara Stadium; Referee: Bola Abidoye (Nigeria)

=== 2004 ===
10 July 2004 African Championship qualification	Senegal	2–8	Nigeria	Dakar, Senegal
	Bathe Thiaw 53'; Awa Diop 90'	Report	Uwak 8', 17', 89'; Avre 15', 35', 50', 66'; Jerome Ulunma 89'	Stadium: Stade Iba Mar Diop; Referee: Maman Fati (Benin)

24 July 2004 African Championship qualification	Nigeria	4–1 (Note: The match was abandoned in the 76th minute after a riot police officer accidentally discharged tear gas, causing panic among fans who began rushing to open areas.)	Senegal	Warri, Nigeria
	Uwak 6', 59'; Obi 49'; Melkuleyi Titilayo 74'	Report	M. Ndiaye 66'	Stadium: Warri Stadium; Referee: Aissata Amégée (Togo)

=== 2005 ===
16 May 2005 Solidarity Tournament GS	Senegal	4–1	Mali	Dakar, Senegal
		Report		Stadium: Stade Iba Mar Diop

20 May 2005 Solidarity Tournament GS	Senegal	3–3	Ivory Coast	Dakar, Senegal
17:00 UTC+0		Report		Stadium: Stade Iba Mar Diop

22 May 2005 Solidarity Tournament F	Senegal	0–1	Mali	Dakar, Senegal
		Report	Fatoumata Doumbia 9'	Stadium: Stade Iba Mar Diop

=== 2006 ===
19 February 2006 African Championship qualification	Senegal	4–0	Central African Republic	Dakar, Senegal

12 March 2006 African Championship qualification	Senegal	7–0	Guinea	Dakar, Senegal
	Bassine Thiaw 6', 37'; Makane Faye 44', 88'; Serena Lena Gomis 49'; M. Ndiaye 51'; Mame Khardiata Mbengue 90+3'	Report		Stadium: Stade Demba Diop; Referee: Khadidiatou Ba (Mauritania)

26 March 2006 African Championship qualification	Guinea	1–5	Senegal	Conakry, Guinea

23 July 2006 African Championship qualification	DR Congo	3–0	Senegal	Kinshasa, DR Congo
	Mbimbi Vavadio 12'; Malembo 22'; Diasilwa 45'	Report		Stadium: Stade des Martyrs

5 August 2006 African Championship qualification	Senegal	2–0	DR Congo	Dakar, Senegal
				Stadium: Stade Iba Mar Diop

17 October Friendly	Senegal	2–3	Algeria	Dakar, Senegal

20 October Friendly	Senegal	2–0	Algeria	Dakar, Senegal

=== 2007 ===
12 July 2007 All-Africa Games GS	Algeria	3–1	Senegal	Zéralda, Algeria
16:30 UTC+0	Bouhani 9', 15'; Zerrouki 18'		Shady Sal Fall 63'	Stadium: Zéralda Stadium

15 July 2007 All-Africa Games GS	Ghana	3–0	Senegal	Algiers, Algeria
16:30 UTC+0	Ankomah 39'; Silla Owusu 41', 85'			Stadium: Stade Omar Hamadi

1 December 2008 African Championship qualification	Senegal	1–1	Ivory Coast	Dakar, Senegal
16:00 UTC+0	Séréna Léna Gomis 20'; Bassine Thiaw (yellow card) 84'	Report	Atelika Coulibaly (yellow card) 23'; Ange Atsé Chiépo 36'; F. Coulibaly (yellow card) 73'	Stadium: Stade Iba Mar Diop; Referee: Mercy Tagoe (Ghana)

16 December 2008 African Championship qualification	Ivory Coast	2–0	Senegal	Abidjan, Ivory Coast
	B. Diakité 16'; Ange Atsé Chiépo 89'	Report		Stadium: Robert Champroux Stadium

=== 2010 ===
6 March 2010 African Championship qualification	Senegal	0–0	Morocco	Pikine, Senegal
17:00 UTC+0		Report		Stadium: Stade Alassane Djigo; Referee: Thérèse Sagno (Guinea)

20 March 2010 African Championship qualification	Morocco	0–1	Senegal	Salé, Morocco
15:30 UTC+0		Report	M. Ndiaye 10'	Stadium: Stade Boubker Ammar; Referee: Lilia Abdeljaoued (Tunisia)

22 May 2010 African Championship qualification	Senegal	0–1	Ghana	Dakar, Senegal
17:00 UTC+0		Report	Ankomah 43'	Stadium: Stade Demba Diop; Referee: Slidja Moula (Algeria)

6 June 2010 African Championship qualification	Ghana	3–0	Senegal	Accra, Ghana
	Boakye 23'; Ankomah 34'; Okoe 65'	Report		Stadium: Ohene Djan Stadium; Referee: Kankou Coulibaly (Mali)

=== 2012 ===
26 May 2012 African Championship qualification	Morocco	0–0	Senegal	Rabat, Morocco
		Report		Stadium: Moulay Hassan Stadium

16 June 2012 African Championship qualification	Senegal	0–0 (5–4 p)	Morocco	Dakar, Senegal
		Report		Stadium: Stade Demba Diop

12 October Friendly	Ivory Coast	6–0	Senegal	Abidjan, Ivory Coast

14 October Friendly	Ivory Coast	2–1	Senegal	Bingerville, Ivory Coast

28 October 2012 African Championship GS	Senegal	0–1	DR Congo	Malabo, Equatorial Guinea
16:30 UTC+0	Khady Fall Sall (yellow card) 45+2'; Sow (red card) 71'; Absa Diop (yellow card) 72'	Report	Bwadi (yellow card) 59'; Nona 74' (pen.) (yellow card) 89'	Stadium: Estadio de Malabo; Referee: Aissata Amegee (Togo)

31 October 2012 African Championship GS	South Africa	1–0	Senegal	Malabo, Equatorial Guinea
13:30 UTC+0	Mgcoyi 70'	Report	Bineta Sylla (yellow card) 71'	Stadium: Estadio de Malabo; Referee: Lidya Tafesse (Ethiopia)

3 November 2012 African Championship GS	Equatorial Guinea	5–0	Senegal	Malabo, Equatorial Guinea
16:30 UTC+0	Jade 5', 14' (yellow card) 85'; Tiga 15'; Jumária 47'; Chapeh (yellow card) 51'; Añonman 72'	Report		Stadium: Estadio de Malabo; Referee: Grace Msiska (Malawi)

=== 2014 ===
14 January Friendly	Algeria	1–2	Senegal	Algiers, Algeria
	Bekhedda 59'	Report	Artou Sy 38'; Fatimata Tamboura 70'	Stadium: FAF National Technical Centre

17 January Friendly	Algeria	3–0	Senegal	Algiers, Algeria
16:00 UTC+0	Bekhedda 15'; Bouhani 38', 70'	Report		Stadium: Omar Hamadi Stadium

24 May 2014 African Championship qualification	Senegal	1–1	Cameroon	Ziguinchor, Senegal
17:00 UTC+0	Sylla 76'		Nchout 58'	Stadium: Stade Aline Sitoe Diatta; Referee: Christine Ziga (Ghana)

8 June 2014 African Championship qualification	Cameroon	1–0	Senegal	Yaoundé, Cameroon
14:30 UTC+0	Zouga 67'			Stadium: Stade Ahmadou Ahidjo; Referee: Aya Ahoua (Ivory Coast)

=== 2015 ===
21 March 2015 African Games qualification	Egypt	0–0	Senegal	Cairo, Egypt
13:30 UTC+0		Report		Stadium: Petro Sport Stadium; Referee: Zomadre Kore (Ivory Coast)

11 April 2015 African Games qualification	Senegal	1–2	Egypt	M'Bour, Senegal
16:30 UTC+0	Diakhaté 60'	Report	Nada Nasser 37'; Salma Tarik 76'	Stadium: Stade Caroline Faye; Referee: Aissata Amegee (Togo)

=== 2016 ===
5 March 2016 WAFCON qualification	Senegal	1–0	Guinea	Dakar, Senegal
17:00 UTC+0	B. Diakhaté 5'; N. Ndiaye (yellow card) 28'	Report	Maimouna Camara (yellow card) 62'	Stadium: Stade Demba Diop; Referee: Viviane Igue (Benin)

19 March 2016 WAFCON qualification	Guinea	1–0 (2–4 p)	Senegal	Conakry, Guinea
16:30 UTC+0	Ivonne Mara (yellow card) 27'; Maimouna Camara (yellow card) 76'; Fatoumata Kanté 82'	Report	Mareme Diop Yally (yellow card) 81'	Stadium: Stade du 28 Septembre; Referee: Leopoldina Ross (Guinea-Bissau)
	Penalties
	Mabinty Camara (penalty missed); Mariama Barry (penalty missed)

8 April 2016 WAFCON qualification	Senegal	1–1	Nigeria	Dakar, Senegal
17:00 UTC+0	B. Diakhaté 52'	Report	Wogu 45'	Stadium: Stade Demba Diop; Referee: Lamyaa Lourarhi (Morocco)

12 April 2016 WAFCON qualification	Nigeria	2–0	Senegal	Abuja, Nigeria
	Chikwelu 36'; Igbinovia 46'	Report		Stadium: National Stadium; Referee: Julie Kanyembo (DR Congo)

=== 2018 ===
15 February 2018 WAFU Zone B Cup GS	Senegal	6–0	Togo	Abidjan, Ivory Coast
17:30 UTC+0	Astou Ngom 7'; Mariama Diedhiou 11', 31'; S. Sagna 28'; M. Diop 78'; A. Diakhaté 86'	Report		Stadium: Parc des sports de Treichville

17 February 2018 WAFU Zone B Cup GS	Nigeria	3–0	Senegal	Abidjan, Ivory Coast
18:30 UTC+0	Ajibade 25', 30', 32'	Report		Stadium: Parc des sports de Treichville

19 February 2018 WAFU Zone B Cup GS	Mali	1–0	Senegal	Abidjan, Ivory Coast
20:00 UTC+0	Diarra	Report		Stadium: Stade Robert Champroux

14 March Friendly	Senegal	2–3	Morocco	Toubab Dialaw, Senegal
	Astou Ngom 50'; Ndiaye 90+7'	Report	Jraïdi 54'; Chebbak 85'; Mariam Bouihed 90+5'	Stadium: Jules François Bocandé Technical Centre

16 March Friendly	Senegal	1–0	Morocco	Pikine, Senegal
	S. Sagna	Report		Stadium: Stade Alassane Djigo

4 April 2018 WAFCON qualification	Senegal	2–1	Algeria	Pikine, Senegal
17:00 UTC+0	Mariama Diédhiou 6' (pen.); M. Diop 10'	Report	Benlazar 38'	Stadium: Stade Alassane Djigo; Referee: Vincentia Amedome (Togo)

10 April 2018 WAFCON qualification	Algeria	2–0	Senegal	Algiers, Algeria
16:45 UTC+1	Sekouane 24' (pen.); Benaichouche 90+3'	Report		Stadium: 20 August Stadium; Referee: Zomadre Kore (Ivory Coast)

=== 2019 ===
8 May 2019 WAFU Zone B Cup GS	Ghana	2–0	Senegal	Abidjan, Ivory Coast
	Badu 65'; Abdulai 74'	Report		Stadium: Robert Champroux Stadium

10 May 2019 WAFU Zone B Cup GS	Ivory Coast	4–0	Senegal	Abidjan, Ivory Coast
	N'Guessan 66'; Kouassi 85', 89'; Kreto 90+3'	Report		Stadium: Parc des sports de Treichville

13 May 2019 WAFU Zone B Cup GS	Senegal	1–2	Togo	Abidjan, Ivory Coast
	82'	Report	Woedikou 10'; Bertille Yawa Konou 27'	Stadium: Robert Champroux Stadium

18 December Friendly	Senegal	3–2	Gambia	Toubab Dialaw, Senegal
17:00 UTC+0		Report	Tamba; Ola Buwaro	Stadium: Jules François Bocandé Technical Centre

21 December Friendly	Senegal	4–2	Gambia	Thiès, Senegal
16:00 UTC+0	N. Ndiaye 24', 32', 70'; Astou Ngom 52'	Report	Tamba 41'; Darboe 83'	Stadium: Stade Lat-Dior; Referee: Mame Coumba Faye (Senegal)

=== 2020 ===
25 February 2020 WAFU Zone A Cup GS	Guinea	0–1	Senegal	Bo, Sierra Leone
16:30 UTC+0		Report	A. Diakhaté 18' (pen.)	Stadium: Bo Stadium; Referee: Isatou Touray (Gambia); Player of the Match: Mama Diop (Senegal)

26 February 2020 WAFU Zone A Cup GS	Cape Verde	0–2	Senegal	Bo, Sierra Leone
14:00 UTC+0		Report	M. Sow 36'; M. Diop 67'	Stadium: Bo Stadium; Player of the Match: Haby Baldé (Senegal)

1 March 2020 WAFU Zone A Cup GS	Sierra Leone	1–1	Senegal	Bo, Sierra Leone
16:00 UTC+0	Rashidatu Kamara 61'	Report	M. Diop 90+2'	Stadium: Bo Stadium; Referee: Edoh Kindedji (Togo)

4 March 2020 WAFU Zone A Cup SF	Senegal	2–1	Liberia	Bo, Sierra Leone
16:00 UTC+0	N. Ndiaye 18'; A. Diakhaté 34'	Report	Hawa Kpan 62'	Stadium: Bo Stadium; Player of the Match: Mama Diop (Senegal)

7 March 2020 WAFU Zone A Cup F	Senegal	3–0	Mali	Makeni, Sierra Leone
16:30 UTC+0	M. Sow 26'; A. Diakhaté 56'; Haby Baldé 70'	Report		Stadium: Wusum Sports Stadium

=== 2021 ===
15 September Friendly	Senegal	1–0	Cape Verde	Toubab Dialaw, Senegal
17:00 UTC+0	Jeanne Coumba Niang 15'	Report		Stadium: Jules François Bocandé Technical Centre; Attendance: 0 (Behind closed doors)

18 September Friendly	Senegal	1–0	Cape Verde	Toubab Dialaw, Senegal
17:00 UTC+0	Sow 63'	Report		Stadium: Jules François Bocandé Technical Centre; Attendance: 0 (Behind closed doors)

20 October 2022 WAFCON qualification	Liberia	1–2	Senegal	Monrovia, Senegal
15:00 UTC+0	Lucy Kikeh (yellow card) 68' (goal) 90+5'	Report	M. Diop 24' (yellow card) 77'; A. Diakhaté 85'	Stadium: Samuel Kanyon Doe Sports Complex; Attendance: 50; Referee: Ana Maria Lopes (Cape Verde)

26 October 2022 WAFCON qualification	Senegal	6–0	Liberia	Thiès, Senegal
17:00 UTC+0	A. Diakhaté 4'; N. Ndiaye 30', 44', 45+2'; M. Diop 63', 67'; S. Sagna (yellow card) 64'	Report	Ruth Wesseh (yellow card) 20' (yellow-red card) 76'	Stadium: Stade Lat-Dior; Attendance: 175; Referee: Isatou Touray (Gambia)

30 November Friendly	Morocco	2–0	Senegal	Rabat, Morocco
18:00 UTC+0	Hassani 81'; Mssoudy 90+2'	Report		Stadium: Moulay Hassan Stadium; Referee: Bouchra Karboubi (Morocco)

=== 2022 ===
16 February 2022 WAFCON qualification	Senegal	1–0	Mali	Thiès, Senegal
16:30 UTC+0	N. Ndiaye (yellow card) 18' (goal) 72'; A. Diakhaté (yellow card) 65'	Report	Dembele (yellow card) 34'	Stadium: Stade Lat-Dior; Referee: Aïssata Lam (Mauritania)

22 February 2022 WAFCON qualification	Mali	1–0 (2–3 p)	Senegal	Bamako, Mali
	A. Diarra 14'; Konté (yellow card) 27'; S. Diarra (yellow card) 69'; Baradji (yellow card) 90+3'	Report	Diagne (yellow card) 47'; Diop (yellow card) 52'; Sow (yellow card) 68'	Stadium: Stade Modibo Kéïta; Referee: Juliet Appiah (Ghana)
	Penalties
	F. Diarra (penalty missed); S. Diarra (penalty missed); Sogoré (penalty scored); Baradji (penalty scored); Niakaté (penalty missed)		(penalty scored) Diop; (penalty missed) N. Ndiaye; (penalty scored) A. Diakhaté; (penalty scored) Baldé

15 June Friendly	Cameroon	2–2	Senegal	Douala, Cameroon
17:00 UTC+0	Omboudou 52'; Bodolo 90+3'	Report	H. Diallo 81'; Niang 90'	Stadium: Reunification Stadium; Referee: Aline Guimbang À Etong (Cameroon)

18 June Friendly	Cameroon	1–0	Senegal	Douala, Cameroon
15:00 UTC+0	Ossol 3'	Report		Stadium: Stade de Bepanda; Referee: Nadine Kenne (Cameroon)

23 June Friendly	Senegal	3–0	Guinea-Bissau	Thiès, Senegal
17:00 UTC+0	N. Ndiaye; K. Fall; A. Diakhaté	Report		Stadium: Stade Lat-Dior

27 June Friendly	Tunisia	0–0	Senegal	Tunis, Tunisia
16:00 UTC+2		Report		Stadium: Chedly Zouiten Stadium

3 July 2022 Africa Cup of Nations GS	Senegal	2–0	Uganda	Rabat, Morocco
15:00 UTC+0	A. Diakhaté (yellow card) 35' (goal) 39' (pen.); N. Ndiaye 50'; Babou (yellow card) 90+1'	Report		Stadium: Prince Moulay Abdellah Stadium; Referee: Dorsaf Ganouati (Tunisia)

5 July 2022 Africa Cup of Nations GS	Burkina Faso	0–1	Senegal	Rabat, Morocco
17:00 UTC+0	Millogo (yellow card) 53'	Report	N. Ndiaye (yellow card) 33'; Sow (yellow card) 74'; Fall 84'	Stadium: Prince Moulay Abdellah Stadium; Referee: Suavis Iratunga (Burundi)

8 July 2022 Africa Cup of Nations GS	Morocco	1–0	Senegal	Rabat, Morocco
20:00 UTC+0	Chebbak 55' (pen.)	Report	Ngom (yellow card) 38'; S. Sagna (yellow card) 59'; Seck (yellow card) 73'	Stadium: Prince Moulay Abdellah Stadium; Referee: Akhona Makalima (South Africa)

13 July 2022 Africa Cup of Nations QF	Zambia	1–1 (4–2 p)	Senegal	Casablanca, Morocco
17:00 UTC+0	Tembo (yellow card) 8'; Mweemba (yellow card) 20'; Chitundu (yellow card) 56' (goal) 70'	Report	N. Ndiaye 61'; S. Sagna (yellow card) 69'	Stadium: Stade Mohammed V Referee: Bouchra Karboubi (Morocco)
	Penalties
	Chanda (penalty scored); Zulu (penalty scored); I. Lungu (penalty scored); Mweemba (penalty missed); Nali (penalty scored)		(penalty missed) Fall; (penalty scored) Diop; (penalty scored) Baldé; (penalty missed) Diakhaté

17 July 2022 Africa Cup of Nations R	Senegal	0–0 (4–2 p)	Tunisia	Casablanca, Morocco
17:00 UTC+0	Sow (yellow card) 14'; Seck (yellow card) 29'; Camara (yellow card) 59'; N. Ndiaye (yellow card) 82'	Report	Ayadi (yellow card) 69'	Stadium: Stade Mohammed V Referee: Letticia Viana (Eswatini)
	Penalties
	Diop (penalty scored); Diallo (penalty missed); Sow (penalty scored); N. Ndiaye (penalty scored); Fall (penalty scored)		(penalty scored) Ellouzi; (penalty missed) Houij; (penalty missed) Ayadi; (penalty scored) Aouni

=== 2023 ===
21 January 2023 WAFU Zone A Cup GS	Senegal	4–0	Guinea	Espargos, Cape Verde
16:00 UTC+0	H. Diallo 5', 10'; Fall 48'; Jeanne Coumba Niang 57'	Report		Stadium: Estádio Marcelo Leitão

23 January 2023 WAFU Zone A Cup GS	Gambia	1–4	Senegal	Espargos, Cape Verde
17:00 UTC+0	Jatta 45+3' (pen.)	Report	H. Diallo 2', 49', 71', 83'	Stadium: Estádio Marcelo Leitão; Referee: Sylvina Garnett (Liberia)

25 January 2023 WAFU Zone A Cup GS	Sierra Leone	0–4	Senegal	Espargos, Cape Verde
17:00 UTC+0		Report	N. Ndiaye 46', 76'; H. Diallo 79'; Jeanne Coumba Niang 90+6'	Stadium: Estádio Marcelo Leitão; Referee: Yacine Samassa (Mauritania)

27 January 2023 WAFU Zone A Cup SF	Senegal	4–0	Guinea-Bissau	Espargos, Cape Verde
17:00 UTC+0	N. Ndiaye 13'; H. Diallo 51' (pen.), 68'; Fall 82'	Report		Stadium: Estádio Marcelo Leitão; Referee: Aissata Diarra (Mali)

29 January 2023 WAFU Zone A Cup F	Cape Verde	0–1	Senegal	Espargos, Cape Verde
17:00 UTC+0		Report	Fall 60' (pen.)	Stadium: Estádio Marcelo Leitão; Referee: Sylvina Garnett (Liberia)

18 February 2023 FIFA World Cup qualification	Senegal	0–4	Haiti	Hamilton, New Zealand
01:00 UTC+0	Diop (yellow card) 12'; Anta Dembélé (yellow card) 19'; Fall (yellow card) 28'; Haby Baldé (yellow card) 45+3'; Sow (yellow card) 47'; W. Ndiaye (yellow card) 66'; N. Ndiaye (yellow card) 82'	Report	K. Louis (yellow card) 33' (goal) 45'; Mondésir 55'; Borgella 64', 66'	Stadium: North Harbour Stadium; Attendance: 925; Referee: Kateryna Monzul (Ukraine)

21 February Friendly	Thailand	1–1	Senegal	Hamilton, New Zealand
06:00 UTC+0	Janista 17'	Report	A. Diakhaté 67' (pen.)	Stadium: Waikato Stadium; Attendance: 711; Referee: Emikar Calderas (Venezuela)

8 April Friendly	Ghana	3–0	Senegal	Accra, Ghana
16:00 UTC+0	Assifuah 2', 45+1'; Asantewaa 9'	Report		Stadium: Accra Sports Stadium; Referee: Vincentia Amedome (Togo)

11 April Friendly	Ghana	1–0	Senegal	Accra, Ghana
16:00 UTC+0	Badu 85'	Report		Stadium: Accra Sports Stadium; Referee: Vincentia Amedome (Togo)

14 July Friendly	Senegal	3–1	Algeria	Thiès, Senegal
16:30 UTC+0	Sow 30'; N. Ndiaye 87'; Sadigatou Diallo 90+2'	Report	Dafeur 56'	Stadium: Stade Lat-Dior; Referee: Aissata Lam (Mauritania)

18 July Friendly	Senegal	4–0	Algeria	Thiès, Senegal
16:30 UTC+0	N. Ndiaye 15', 90+1'; Diop 34'; Fall 44'	Report		Stadium: Stade Lat-Dior

22 September 2024 WAFCON qualification	Senegal	1–1	Mozambique	Thiès, Senegal
17:00 UTC+0	N. Ndiaye 59'	Report	Moçambique 57'	Stadium: Stade Lat-Dior

25 September 2024 WAFCON qualification	Mozambique	1–2	Senegal	Thiès, Senegal
17:00 UTC+0	Moçambique 12'	Report	Diop 14'; N. Ndiaye 85'	Stadium: Stade Lat-Dior

27 October Friendly	Tunisia	0–2	Senegal	Ariana, Tunisia
14:00 UTC+0		Report	Diop 12'; Coumba Sylla Mbodji 59'	Stadium: Stade Municipal d'Ariana

31 October Friendly	Tunisia	2–3	Senegal	Ariana, Tunisia
14:00 UTC+0	Klai 66'; Kaabachi 90+5'	Report	H. Diallo 9'; Fall 41' (pen.); Coumba Sylla Mbodji 56'	Stadium: Stade Municipal d'Ariana

30 November 2024 WAFCON qualification	Senegal	4–0	Egypt	Thiès, Senegal
17:00 UTC+0	Marème Babou 26'; Ndiaye 30'; H. Diallo 68'; Sow 88'	Report		Stadium: Stade Lat-Dior

5 December 2024 WAFCON qualification	Egypt	0–0	Senegal	Cairo, Egypt
16:00 UTC+0		Report		Stadium: Al Salam Stadium

=== 2024 ===
1 June Friendly	Senegal	1–1	South Africa	Thiès, Senegal
17:00 UTC+0	Sow 90+3' (pen.)	Report	Majiya 67'	Stadium: Stade Lat-Dior; Referee: Isatou Touray (Gambia)

4 June Friendly	Senegal	0–2	South Africa	Thiès, Senegal
17:00 UTC+0	Couma Sylla Mbodji (red card) 68'	Report	Motau 13'; N. Cesane 43'	Stadium: Stade Lat-Dior; Referee: Isatou Touray (Gambia)

12 July Friendly	Senegal	1–0	DR Congo	Thiès, Senegal
17:00 UTC+0	Belange Vukulu 90+2' (o.g.)	Report		Stadium: Stade Lat-Dior; Referee: Félicité Kourouma (Guinea)

16 July Friendly	Senegal	2–0	DR Congo	Thiès, Senegal
17:00 UTC+0	F. Baldé 41'; N. Ndiaye 66'	Report		Stadium: Stade Lat-Dior; Referee: Félicité Kourouma (Guinea)

27 October Friendly	Senegal	1–1	Tanzania	Mohammedia, Morocco
17:00 UTC+0	N. Ndiaye 90'	Report	Clement 45+4'	Stadium: El Bachir Stadium; Referee: Sabah Sadir (Morocco)

29 October Friendly	Morocco	7–0	Senegal	Casablanca, Morocco
18:00 UTC+0	Jraïdi 8' (pen.), 55'; Mrabet 17'; Kassi 28'; Tagnaout 45'; Chapelle 86'; Rania Boutiebi 90+3'	Report		Stadium: Père Jégo Stadium; Referee: Teneba Bagayoko (Mali)

=== 2025 ===
5 April Friendly	Senegal	0–1	Ghana	Thiès, Senegal
17:00 UTC+0		Report	Badu 24'; Achiaa (red card) 62'	Stadium: Stade Lat-Dior

8 April Friendly	Senegal	1–0	Ghana	Thiès, Senegal
17:00 UTC+0	H. Diallo 90'	Report		Stadium: Stade Lat-Dior

22 May 2025 WAFU Zone A Cup GS	Senegal	2–1	Guinea	Nouakchott, Mauritania
19:00 UTC+0	W. Ndiaye 12'; H. Diallo 45+3'	Report	Sidibé 90+2'	Stadium: Cheikha Ould Boïdiya Stadium

24 May 2025 WAFU Zone A Cup GS	Gambia	0–6	Senegal	Nouakchott, Mauritania
16:00 UTC+0		Report	H. Diallo 3', 77'; Camara 31'; Casset 34', 43'; Diokh 65'	Stadium: Cheikha Ould Boïdiya Stadium; Referee: Félicité Kourouma (Guinea)

26 May 2025 WAFU Zone A Cup GS	Senegal	1–1	Sierra Leone	Nouakchott, Mauritania
19:00 UTC+0	H. Diallo 87'	Report	Jumu 3'	Stadium: Cheikha Ould Boïdiya Stadium; Referee: Aissata Lam (Mauritania)

29 May 2025 WAFU Zone A Cup SF	Senegal	1–0	Liberia	Nouakchott, Mauritania
19:00 UTC+0	H. Diallo 70' (pen.)	Report		Stadium: Cheikha Ould Boïdiya Stadium; Referee: Fatou Ngum (Gambia)

31 May 2025 WAFU Zone A Cup F	Sierra Leone	1–0	Senegal	Nouakchott, Mauritania
20:00 UTC+0	S. Kamara 72' (pen.)	Report		Stadium: Cheikha Ould Boïdiya Stadium; Referee: Aissata Lam (Mauritania)

1 July Friendly	Algeria	0–3	Senegal	Blida, Algiers
19:00 UTC+0		Report	N. Ndiaye 55'; H. Diallo 67'; Casset 72'	Stadium: Mustapha Tchaker Stadium

6 July 2024 Africa Cup of Nations GS	Senegal	4–0	DR Congo	Mohammédia, Morocco
14:00 UTC+0	Diop 5', 22'; N. Ndiaye 13', 40'; Kandé (yellow card) 18'	Report	Kabakaba (yellow card) 37'	Stadium: El Bachir Stadium; Referee: Shahenda El Maghrabi (Egypt)

9 July 2024 Africa Cup of Nations GS	Zambia	3–2	Senegal	Mohammédia, Morocco
16:00 UTC+0	Banda 12', 73'; Chanda (yellow card) 31'; Kundananji 51'; Musole (yellow card) 79'	Report	N. Ndiaye 5', 80' (pen.); Seck (yellow card) 45+1'; A. Fall (yellow card) 70'	Stadium: El Bachir Stadium; Referee: Vincentia Amédomé (Togo)

12 July 2024 Africa Cup of Nations GS	Morocco	1–0	Senegal	Rabat, Morocco
19:00 UTC+0	Mrabet (yellow card) 7' (goal) 45+2' (pen.); Chebbak (yellow card) 82'	Report	H. Diallo (yellow card) 31'; A. Ndiaye (yellow card) 45+1'; Sané (yellow card) 45+2'; K. Fall (yellow card) 79'; Casset (yellow card) 90+5'	Stadium: Olympic Stadium; Referee: Shamirah Nabadda (Uganda)

19 July 2024 Africa Cup of Nations QF	South Africa	0–0 (a.e.t.) (4–1 p)	Senegal	Oujda, Morocco
22:00 UTC+0		Report		Stadium: Honneur Stadium; Referee: Shahenda El Maghrabi (Egypt)
	Penalties
	Dhlamini (penalty scored); Makhubela (penalty scored); Salgado (penalty scored); Mbane (penalty scored)		(penalty scored) Diop; (penalty missed) N. Ndiaye; (penalty missed) Meta Kandé

24 October 2026 WAFCON qualification	Senegal	0–0	Ivory Coast	Thiès, Senegal
17:00 UTC+0		Report		Stadium: Stade Lat-Dior; Referee: Mercy Mayimbo (Zimbabwe)

28 October 2026 WAFCON qualification	Ivory Coast	0–0 (4–5 p)	Senegal	Abidjan, Ivory Coast
19:00 UTC+0		Report		Stadium: Felix Houphouet Boigny Stadium; Referee: Shahenda El Maghrabi (Egypt)
	Penalties
	Kakounan (penalty scored); Kreto (penalty scored); Anastasie Gbehi (penalty missed); Elloh (penalty scored); Kouassi (penalty scored)		(penalty scored) Diop; (penalty scored) Diakhaté; (penalty scored) N. Ndiaye; (penalty scored) Diallo; (penalty scored) Marème Babou

== See also ==
- Senegal women's national football team
- Senegal national football team results (2020–present)
