= 2022 Women's Africa Cup of Nations Group A =

Football tournament group stage

Group A of 2022 Women's Africa Cup of Nations was played from 2 to 8 July 2022. The group was made up of host Morocco, Burkina Faso, Senegal and Uganda.

== Teams ==
Draw position	Team	Pot	Federation	Method of qualification	Date of qualification	Finals appearance	Last appearance	Previous best performance	FIFA Rankings										
Draw position	Team	Pot	Federation	Method of qualification	Date of qualification	Finals appearance	Last appearance	Previous best performance	FIFA Rankings	A1	Morocco	Seed	UNAF	Hosts	15 January 2021	3rd	2000	Group stage (1998, 2000)	77
A2	Burkina Faso	1	WAFU	2022 Africa Women Cup of Nations qualification winner	23 February 2022	1st	—	Debut	138										
A3	Senegal	1	WAFU	2022 Africa Women Cup of Nations qualification winner	22 February 2022	2nd	2012	Group stage (2012)	89										
A4	Uganda	1	CECAFA	2022 Africa Women Cup of Nations qualification winner	26 January 2022	2nd	2000	Group stage (2000)	156										

== Standings ==
Pos	Team	Pld	W	D	L	GF	GA	GD	Pts	Qualification
1	Morocco (H)	3	3	0	0	5	1	+4	9	Knockout stage
2	Senegal	3	2	0	1	3	1	+2	6	Knockout stage
3	Burkina Faso	3	0	1	2	2	4	−2	1	
4	Uganda	3	0	1	2	3	7	−4	1	

Source: CAF (archived)
Rules for classification: Group stage tiebreakers
(H) Hosts

== Matches ==
=== Morocco vs Burkina Faso ===
2 July 2022
21:30

Morocco	1–0	Burkina Faso
Chebbak 29'	Report (FIFA); Report (CAF)

Prince Moulay Abdellah Stadium, Rabat
Referee: Salima Mukansanga (Rwanda)

Morocco

Team stats
Morocco	Statistic	Burkina Faso
16	Shots	9
7	Shots on target	3
58%	Possession	42%
312	Passes	227
74%	Pass accuracy	59%
11	Fouls	15
3	Yellow cards	2
0	Red cards	0
3	Offsides	2
5	Corners	0

Burkina Faso

Formation: 4–3–3
GK	1	Khadija Er-Rmichi	(yellow card) 87'
LB	2	Zineb Redouani
CB	5	Nesryne El Chad
CB	21	Yasmin Mrabet
RB	17	Hanane Aït El Haj
CM	7	Ghizlane Chebbak
DM	6	Élodie Nakkach
CM	8	Salma Amani	(substituted off) 80'
LW	20	Imane Saoud	(yellow card) 76'	(substituted off) 80'
ST	23	Rosella Ayane
RW	11	Fatima Tagnaout
Substitutions:
DF	13	Sabah Seghir	(substituted on) 80'
FW	16	Samya Hassani	(yellow card) 90+2'	(substituted on) 80'
Manager:
(France) Reynald Pedros

Formation: 4–2–3–1
GK	16	Mariam Ouattara
RB	13	Diamilatou Zongo
CB	14	Madina Rouamba	(yellow card) 52'
CB	9	Alimata Bélem
LB	3	Assanatou Nako	(substituted off) 71'
CM	4	Jacqueline Sédogo	(substituted off) 37'
DM	12	Charlotte Millogo	(substituted off) 82'
RW	18	Juliette Nana	(substituted off) 72'
AM	10	Rasmata Sawadogo
LW	11	Balkissa Sawadogo
CF	6	Adama Congo
Substitutions:
MF	15	Adele Kabré	(substituted on) 82'
DF	2	Madina Traoré	(yellow card) 44' (substituted on) 37'
FW	17	Limata Nikiéma	(substituted on) 72'
DF	5	Rabiatou Koudougou	(substituted on) 71'
Manager:
Pascal Sawadogo

Woman of the Match:
Ghizlane Chebbak (Morocco)

=== Senegal vs Uganda ===
3 July 2022
16:00

Senegal	2–0	Uganda
Diakhaté 39' (pen.); N. Ndiaye 50'	Report (FIFA); Report (CAF)

Prince Moulay Abdellah Stadium, Rabat
Referee: Dorsaf Ganouati (Tunisia)

Senegal

Team stats
Senegal	Statistic	Uganda
12	Shots	15
3	Shots on target	5
44%	Possession	56%
262	Passes	331
62%	Pass accuracy	65%
10	Fouls	6
2	Yellow cards	0
0	Red cards	0
1	Offsides	1
7	Corners	7

Uganda

Formation: 4–2–3–1
GK	21	Tenning Séne
LB	2	Marième Babou	(yellow card) 90+1'
CB	8	Mbayang Sow	(substituted off) 69'
CB	18	Meta Camara
RB	3	Anta Dembele
DM	13	Jeannette Sagna
CM	12	Safiétou Sagna	(substituted off) 75'
LW	11	Haby Baldé	(substituted off) 88'
AM	10	Ndeye Awa Diakhaté	(yellow card) 35' (substituted off) 76'
RW	17	Hapsatou Malado Diallo
CF	9	Nguenar Ndiaye	(substituted off) 69'
Substitutions:
MF	6	Edmée Diagne	(substituted on) 75'
FW	23	Astou Ngom	(substituted on) 69'
MF	20	Korka Fall	(substituted on) 76'
MF	19	Bineta Korkel Seck	(substituted on) 88'
DF	4	Mame Diarra Diouf	(substituted on) 69'
Manager:
Mame Moussa Cissé

Formation: 4–3–3
GK	1	Ruth Aturo
RB	2	Asia Nakibuuka
CB	5	Aisha Nantongo
CB	4	Yudaya Nakayenze
LB	3	Sumaya Komuntale
CM	21	Shamirah Nalugya	(substituted off) 64'
DM	12	Joan Nabirye
CM	10	Hasifah Nassuna	(substituted off) 45'
RW	7	Violah Nambi	(substituted off) 45'
ST	11	Ritah Kivumbi
LW	13	Fauzia Najjemba
Substitutions:
FW	8	Sandra Nabweteme	(substituted on) 64'
FW	9	Fazila Ikwaput	(substituted on) 45'
MF	16	Phiona Nabbumba	(substituted on) 45'
Manager:
George Lutalo

=== Burkina Faso vs Senegal ===
5 July 2022
18:00

Burkina Faso	0–1	Senegal
	Report (FIFA); Report (CAF)	Fall 84' (pen.)

Prince Moulay Abdellah Stadium, Rabat
Referee: Suavis Iratunga (Burundi)

Burkina Faso

Team stats
Burkina Faso	Statistic	Senegal
8	Shots	9
2	Shots on target	4
48%	Possession	52%
238	Passes	257
58%	Pass accuracy	54%
13	Fouls	18
1	Yellow cards	2
0	Red cards	0
1	Offsides	1
3	Corners	4

Senegal

Formation: 4–2–3–1
GK	16	Mariam Ouattara
RB	13	Diamilatou Zongo
CB	14	Madina Rouamba
CB	9	Alimata Bélem
LB	5	Rabiatou Koudougou
CM	10	Rasmata Sawadogo
CM	12	Charlotte Millogo	(yellow card) 53' (substituted off) 64'
RW	6	Adama Congo
AM	15	Adèle Kabré	(substituted off) 90+1'
LW	11	Balkissa Sawadogo
CF	17	Limata Nikiéma
Substitutions:
MF	26	Félicité Kafando	(substituted on) 63'
FW	8	Fadiratou Tarnagda	(substituted on) 63'
FW	18	Juliette Nana	(substituted on) 90+1'
Manager:
Pascal Sawadogo

Formation: 4–2–3–1
GK	21	Tenning Séne
LB	2	Marième Babou
CB	8	Mbayang Sow	(yellow card) 74'
CB	18	Meta Camara
RB	3	Anta Dembele
CM	13	Jeannette Sagna
CM	12	Safiétou Sagna	(substituted off) 60'
LW	11	Haby Baldé	(substituted off) 59'
AM	10	Ndeye Awa Diakhaté	(substituted off) 77'
RW	7	Mama Diop
CF	9	Nguenar Ndiaye	(yellow card) 33' (substituted off) 77'
Substitutions:
MF	6	Edmée Diagne	(substituted on) 60'
MF	20	Korka Fall	(substituted on) 77'
FW	17	Hapsatou Malado Diallo	(substituted on) 59'
FW	23	Astou Ngom	(substituted on) 77'
Manager:
Mame Moussa Cissé

=== Uganda vs Morocco ===
5 July 2022
21:00

Uganda	1–3	Morocco
Komuntale 32'	Report (FIFA); Report (CAF)	Ayane 14' (pen.); El Chad 68'; Chebbak 84' (pen.)

Prince Moulay Abdellah Stadium, Rabat
Referee: Vincentia Amedome (Togo)

Uganda

Team stats
Uganda	Statistic	Morocco
10	Shots	9
2	Shots on target	5
37%	Possession	63%
232	Passes	383
56%	Pass accuracy	77%
12	Fouls	14
1	Yellow cards	2
1	Red cards	0
0	Offsides	0
2	Corners	4

Morocco

Formation: 4–3–3
GK	1	Ruth Aturo
RB	2	Asia Nakibuuka	(yellow card) 37'
CB	6	Margret Namirimu
CB	16	Phiona Nabbumba
LB	3	Sumaya Komuntale	(yellow card) 39' (yellow-red card) 82'
CM	21	Shamirah Nalugya
DM	12	Joan Nabirye
CM	8	Sandra Nabweteme
RW	13	Fauzia Najjemba
ST	11	Ritah Kivumbi	(substituted off) 69'
LW	9	Fazila Ikwaput	(substituted off) 79'
Substitutions:
FW	7	Violah Nambi	(substituted on) 69'
FW	14	Joanitah Ainembabazi	(substituted on) 79'
Manager:
George Lutalo

Formation: 4–2–3–1
GK	1	Khadija Er-Rmichi
LB	2	Zineb Redouani
CB	5	Nesryne El Chad
CB	21	Yasmin Mrabet
RB	17	Hanane Aït El Haj
CM	7	Ghizlane Chebbak
CM	6	Élodie Nakkach	(yellow card) 57' (substituted off) 88'
LW	11	Fatima Tagnaout	(substituted off) 67'
CM	8	Salma Amani	(substituted off) 61'
RW	16	Samya Hassani
ST	23	Rosella Ayane	(substituted off) 88'
Substitutions:
MF	10	Najat Badri	(substituted on) 88'
MF	20	Imane Saoud	(substituted on) 67'
FW	8	Ibtissam Jraïdi	(substituted on) 88'
FW	18	Sanaâ Mssoudy	(substituted on) 61'
Manager:
(France) Reynald Pedros

=== Morocco vs Senegal ===
8 July 2022
21:00

Morocco	1–0	Senegal
Chebbak 55' (pen.)	Report (FIFA); Report (CAF)

Prince Moulay Abdellah Stadium, Rabat
Referee: Akhona Makalima (South Africa)

Morocco

Team stats
Morocco	Statistic	Senegal
17	Shots	6
5	Shots on target	2
68%	Possession	32%
452	Passes	217
84%	Pass accuracy	69%
11	Fouls	11
0	Yellow cards	3
0	Red cards	0
1	Offsides	3
6	Corners	1

Senegal

Formation: 4–3–3
GK	1	Khadija Er-Rmichi
RB	2	Zineb Redouani
CB	17	Hanane Aït El Haj
CB	21	Yasmin Mrabet
LB	15	Ghizlane Chhiri
CM	6	Élodie Nakkach
CM	7	Ghizlane Chebbak
RW	16	Samya Hassani	(substituted off) 62'
AM	18	Sanaâ Mssoudy
LW	11	Fatima Tagnaout	(substituted off) 73'
ST	23	Rosella Ayane	(substituted off) 89'
Substitutions:
MF	8	Salma Amani	(substituted on) 73'
MF	20	Imane Saoud	(substituted on) 62'
FW	9	Ibtissam Jraïdi	(substituted on) 89'
Manager:
(France) Reynald Pedros

Formation: 4–2–3–1
GK	16	Ndeye Meïssa Diaw
LB	5	Ndèye Ndiaye Kané
CB	18	Meta Camara
CB	4	Mame Diarra Diouf
RB	14	Salimata Ndiaye
CM	6	Edmée Diagne
CM	12	Safiétou Sagna	(yellow card) 59' (substituted off) 65'
LW	23	Astou Ngom	(yellow card) 38' (substituted off) 55'
AM	20	Korka Fall	(substituted off) 65'
RW	15	Jeanne Niang	(substituted off) 65'
ST	7	Mama Diop
Substitutions:
MF	11	Haby Baldé	(substituted on) 65'
MF	13	Jeannette Sagna	(substituted on) 65'
MF	19	Bineta Korkel Seck	(substituted on) 65'
FW	17	Hapsatou Malado Diallo	(substituted on) 55'
Manager:
Mame Moussa Cissé

=== Burkina Faso vs Uganda ===
8 July 2022
21:00

Burkina Faso	2–2	Uganda
Congo 35'; Kabré 41'	Report (FIFA); Report (CAF)	Kunihira 8'; Nabweteme 38'

Stade Mohammed V, Casablanca
Referee: Patience Madu (Nigeria)

== Discipline ==
Fair play points were used as tiebreakers in the group if the overall and head-to-head records of teams were tied, or if teams had the same record in the ranking of third-placed teams. These are calculated based on yellow and red cards received in all group matches as follows:

- first yellow card: plus 1 point;
- indirect red card (second yellow card): plus 3 points;
- direct red card: plus 4 points;
- yellow card and direct red card: plus 5 points;

Team	Match 1				Match 2				Match 3				Points
Team	Booked	(yellow card) (yellow-red card)	Sent off (straight red)	(yellow card) (red card)	Booked	(yellow card) (yellow-red card)	Sent off (straight red)	(yellow card) (red card)	Booked	(yellow card) (yellow-red card)	Sent off (straight red)	(yellow card) (red card)	Points
Morocco (H)	3				2								–5
Senegal	2				2				3				–7
Burkina Faso	2				1				2		1		–9
Uganda					2	1			1				–6

== Goalscorers ==
There were 13 goals scored in 6 matches, for an average of 2.17 goals per match.

3 goals

- (Morocco) Ghizlane Chebbak

1 goal

- (Burkina Faso) Adama Congo
- (Burkina Faso) Adèle Kabré
- (Morocco) Rosella Ayane
- (Morocco) Nesryne El Chad
- (Senegal) Ndeye Awa Diakhaté
- (Senegal) Korka Fall
- (Senegal) Nguenar Ndiaye
- (Uganda) Sumaya Komuntale
- (Uganda) Margret Kunihira
- (Uganda) Sandra Nabweteme
