= 2022 Women's Africa Cup of Nations knockout stage =

The knockout stage of the 2022 Women's Africa Cup of Nations was the second and final stage of the competition, following the group stage. It began on 13 July with the quarter-finals and ended on 23 July 2022 with the final held at the Prince Moulay Abdellah Stadium in Rabat. A total of eight teams (the top two teams from each group, along with the two best third-placed teams) advanced to the knockout stage to compete in a single-elimination style tournament.

Times listed are GMT (UTC±0).

== Format ==
In the knockout phase, if a match is level at the end of 90 minutes of normal playing time, extra time is played (two periods of 15 minutes each), where each team is allowed to make a fourth substitution. If still tied after extra time, the match is decided by a penalty shoot-out to determine the winners. In the repêchage and third-place play-offs no extra time is played and the match is decided by a direct penalty shootout.

== Qualified teams ==
The top two placed teams from each of the three groups, along with the two best-placed third teams, qualified for the knockout stage.

Group	Winners	Runners-up	Third-placed teams (Best two qualify)
A	Morocco	Senegal	—N/a
B	Zambia	Cameroon	Tunisia
C	South Africa	Nigeria	Botswana

== Bracket ==
Quarter finals
13 July – Rabat (Moulay Abdellah)
Morocco	2
Botswana	1
14 July – Casablanca
Cameroon	0
Nigeria	1
13 July – Casablanca
Zambia (p)	1 (4)
Senegal	1 (2)
14 July – Rabat (Moulay Hassan)
South Africa	1
Tunisia	0

Semi finals
18 July – Rabat (Moulay Abdellah)
Morocco (p)	1 (5)
Nigeria	1 (4)
18 July – Casablanca
Zambia	0
South Africa	1

Final
23 July – Rabat (Moulay Abdellah)
Morocco	1
South Africa	2
Third place
22 July – Casablanca
Nigeria	0
Zambia	1

Repechage
17 July – Rabat (Moulay Hassan)
Botswana	0
Cameroon	1
17 July – Casablanca
Senegal (p)	0 (4)
Tunisia	0 (2)

== Quarter-finals ==
The winners qualified for the 2023 FIFA Women's World Cup.

=== Zambia vs Senegal ===
13 July 2022
18:00

Zambia	1–1 (a.e.t.)	Senegal
Chitundu 70'	Report (FIFA); Report (CAF)	N. Ndiaye 61'
Penalties
Chanda (penalty scored); Zulu (penalty scored); I. Lungu (penalty scored); Mweemba (penalty missed); Nali (penalty scored)	4–2	(penalty missed) Fall; (penalty scored) Diop; (penalty scored) Baldé; (penalty missed) Diakhaté

Stade Mohammed V, Casablanca
Referee: Bouchra Karboubi (Morocco)

=== Morocco vs Botswana ===
13 July 2022
21:00

Morocco	2–1	Botswana
Mssoudy 3'; Mrabet 59'	Report (FIFA); Report (CAF)	Dithebe 7'

Prince Moulay Abdellah Stadium, Rabat
Referee: Vincentia Amedome (Togo)

=== Cameroon vs Nigeria ===
14 July 2022
18:00

Cameroon	0–1	Nigeria
	Report (FIFA); Report (CAF)	Ajibade 56'

Stade Mohammed V, Casablanca
Referee: Akhona Makalima (South Africa)

=== South Africa vs Tunisia ===
14 July 2022
21:00

South Africa	1–0	Tunisia
Seoposenwe 14'	Report (FIFA); Report (CAF)

Stade Moulay Hassan, Rabat
Referee: Salima Mukansanga (Rwanda)

== Semi-finals ==
=== Zambia vs South Africa ===
18 July 2022
18:00

Zambia	0–1	South Africa
	Report (FIFA); Report (CAF)	Motlhalo 90+4' (pen.)

Stade Mohammed V, Casablanca
Referee: Lidya Tafesse (Ethiopia)

=== Morocco vs Nigeria ===
18 July 2022
21:00

Morocco	1–1 (a.e.t.)	Nigeria
Mssoudy 66'	Report (FIFA); Report (CAF)	Mrabet 62' (o.g.)
Penalties
Mrabet (penalty scored); Chebbak (penalty scored); Redouani (penalty scored); El Chad (penalty scored); Ayane (penalty scored)	5–4	(penalty scored) Chikwelu; (penalty missed) Onumonu; (penalty scored) Otu; (penalty scored) Plumptre; (penalty scored) Monday

Prince Moulay Abdellah Stadium, Rabat
Attendance: 45,562
Referee: Maria Rivet (Mauritius)

== Third place play-off ==
22 July 2022
21:00

Nigeria	0–1	Zambia
	Report (FIFA); Report (CAF)	Nnadozie 29' (o.g.)

Stade Mohammed V, Casablanca
Referee: Vincentia Amedome (Togo)

== Final ==
23 July 2022
21:00

Morocco	1–2	South Africa
Ayane 80'	Report (FIFA); Report (CAF)	Magaia 63', 71'

Prince Moulay Abdellah Stadium, Rabat
Attendance: 50,000
Referee: Salima Mukansanga (Rwanda)

== Repechage ==
The losers of the quarter finals played-off against each other in a single match direct elimination format; the winners advanced to the inter-confederation play-offs.

=== Senegal vs Tunisia ===
17 July 2022
18:00

Senegal	0–0	Tunisia
	Report (FIFA); Report (CAF)
Penalties
Diop (penalty scored); Diallo (penalty missed); Sow (penalty scored); N. Ndiaye (penalty scored); Fall (penalty scored)	4–2	(penalty scored) Ellouzi; (penalty missed) Houij; (penalty missed) Ayadi; (penalty scored) Aouni

Stade Mohammed V, Casablanca
Referee: Letticia Viana (Eswatini)

=== Botswana vs Cameroon ===
17 July 2022
21:00

Botswana	0–1	Cameroon
	Report (FIFA); Report (CAF)	Nchout 45+1'

Stade Moulay Hassan, Rabat
Referee: Suavis Iratunga (Burundi)
