= 2022 Women's Africa Cup of Nations final =

Final match of the 2022 WAFCON

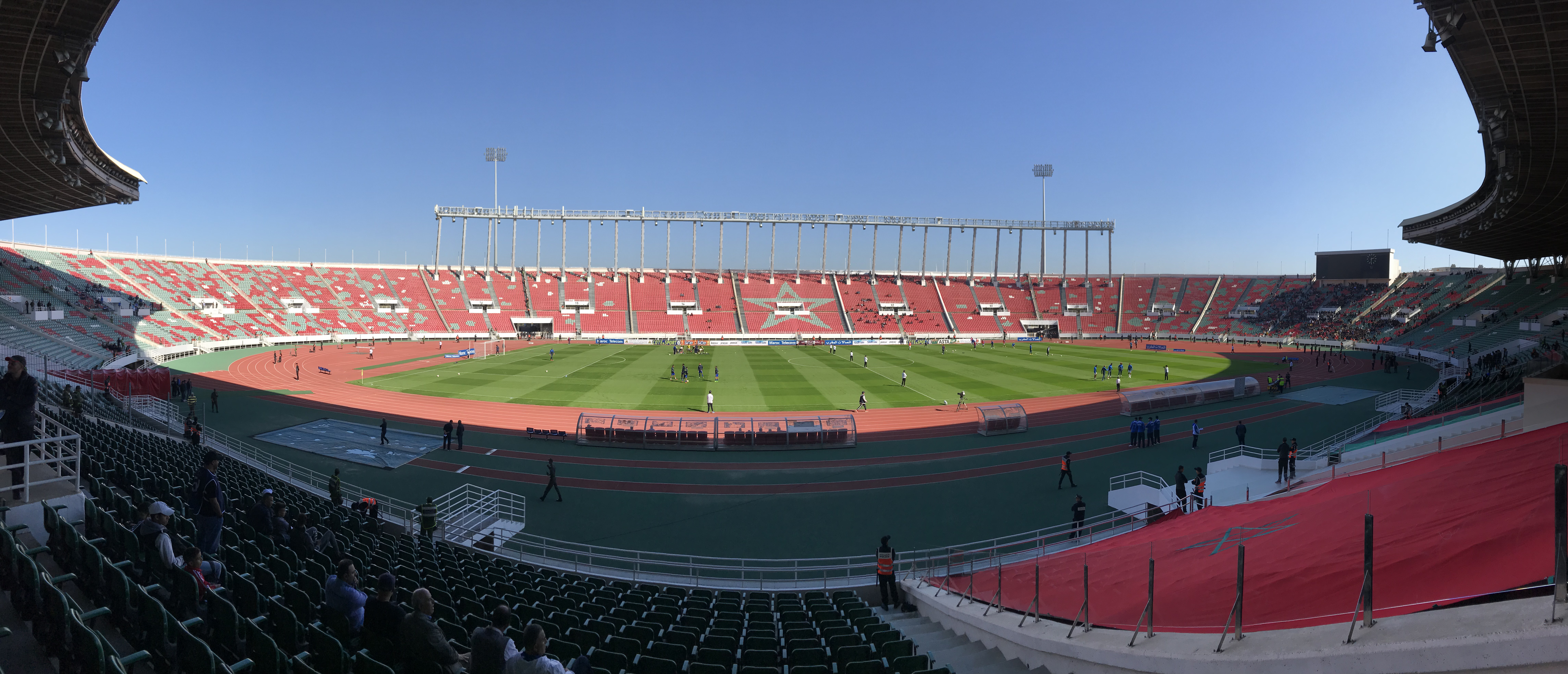
- The Prince Moulay Abdellah Stadium in Rabat hosted the final.
- Event: 2022 Women's Africa Cup of Nations
Morocco	South Africa
1	2
- Date: July 23, 2022
- Venue: Prince Moulay Abdellah Stadium, Rabat
- Referee: Salima Mukansanga (Rwanda)
- Attendance: 50,000

The 2022 Women's Africa Cup of Nations final was the 12th final of the biennial African women's association football tournament organized by the Confederation of African Football (CAF) contested between Morocco and South Africa at Prince Moulay Abdellah Stadium in Rabat, Morocco on 23 July 2022.

The first final in the history of the competition to feature neither the 11-time winners and defending champions Nigeria nor 2-time host-nation winners Equatorial Guinea, South Africa claimed its inaugural title at the 6th attempt with a 2–1 win against host nation Morocco. Prior to this final, the men's national teams of Morocco and South Africa already faced each other in a qualification match for the 2023 Africa Cup of Nations at the same stadium, which Morocco also won 2–1.

== Background ==
The 2022 Women's Africa Cup of Nations was the 14th edition of the biennial African women's football tournament which ran from 2 to 23 July 2022 in Rabat and Marrakesh in Morocco, who became the tournament's first North African host nation.

The qualification process began on 18 October 2021 and concluded 23 February 2022, with 44 out of the 54 African nations vying for the 11 available group stage spots through matches played on a home-and-away two-legged basis. The away goals rule was applied to leveled aggregate scores after the stipulated regulation time after the second leg, with no extra time and straight to penalty shoot-outs to determine the winner. At a CAF executive meeting held on 21 November 2019 ahead of the final of the 2019 U-23 Africa Cup of Nations held the following day, there was an approval of an increase in group stage team participation than in the previous edition in 2018, with 12 teams divided into 3 groups of 4 than the previous 8 teams divided into 2 groups of 4, thus adding the quarter-finals at the knockout stages with the two best 3rd-placed teams joining the already-exiting top-2 teams in each group. These tournament changes would have come to effect at the supposed-to-be 14th edition in 2020, but the COVID-19 pandemic in Africa led CAF to cancel it and rather approve the creation of CAF Women's Champions League which launched the following year, i.e. in 2021.

== Venue ==
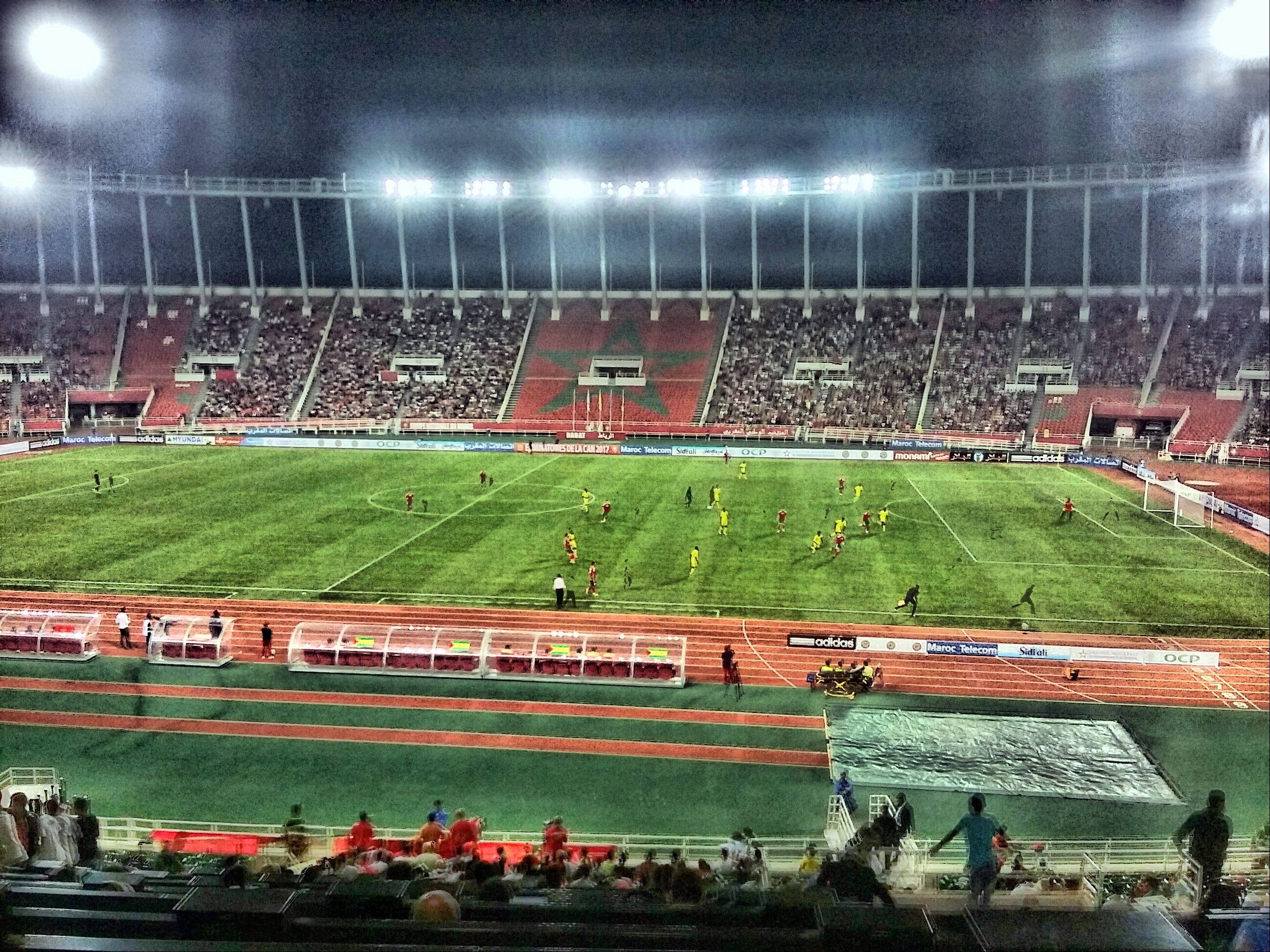
Prince Moulay Abdellah Stadium in Rabat, Morocco in 2016.

The final was held at the 53,000-capacity multi-purpose Prince Moulay Abdellah Stadium in the capital city of Rabat, which previously hosted the 2019 African Games and was one of two stadiums used for the 1988 African Cup of Nations along with the Casablanca-based high-infrastructure larger-capacity Mohammed V Stadium.

== Road to the final ==
Morocco
Round
South Africa
Opponents
Results
Group stage
Opponents
Results
Burkina Faso
1–0
Match 1
Nigeria
2–1
Uganda
3–1
Match 2
Burundi
3–1
Senegal
1–0
Match 3
Botswana
1–0
Group A winners

Pos	Team	Pld	Pts
1	Morocco (H)	3	9
2	Senegal	3	6
3	Burkina Faso	3	1
4	Uganda	3	1

Source: CAF (archived)
(H) Hosts
Final standings
Group C winners

Pos	Team	Pld	Pts
1	South Africa	3	9
2	Nigeria	3	6
3	Botswana	3	3
4	Burundi	3	0

Source: CAF (archived)
Opponents
Results
Knockout stage
Opponents
Results
Botswana
2–1
Quarter-finals
Tunisia
1–0
Nigeria
1–1 (a.e.t.; 5–4 p)
Semi-finals
Zambia
1–0

=== Morocco ===
Having failed to qualify for any of previous WAFCON editions of since 2000, the country was awarded the hosting rights of the 2022 edition on 15 January 2021, effectively qualifying their women's national team automatically for the tournament, making Morocco the tournament's first North African host nation.

Prior to its unveiling as the host nation, Morocco had only participated in two editions; in 1998 where they were heavily defeated by Nigeria at the quarter-finals and in the aforementioned 2000 edition where they finished bottom of their group scoring a single goal all tournament. As the host nation, Morocco got placed in Pot 1 and got seeded alongside women's continental powerhouse and then-defending champions Nigeria and Cameroon. They were drawn in Group A alongside Burkina Faso, Senegal and Uganda. In a relatively easier group with a single tournament edition appearance between their group opponents and having successfully avoided 2018 edition participants, Zambia and South Africa, Morocco finished top of their the group with 3 wins from 3, scoring 5 goals and conceding just one. In the knockout stages, Morocco won 2–1 against debutant minnows and tournament edition surprise package, Botswana, to qualify for the semi-finals and become the first country from North Africa and the Arab world to qualify for the 2023 FIFA Women's World Cup. Morocco reached another milestone by defeating 9-women then-defending champions Nigeria 5–4 on penalties following a 1–1 draw after an extended regulation time and becoming the first North African nation to reach a WAFCON final.

=== South Africa ===
Touted as one of Africa's most traditional women's football teams, South Africa came into their 6th WAFCON final having lost 5 times previously, with the latest being the 2018 final loss on penalties to eventual champions Nigeria. South Africa entered the second stage of the qualification rounds with a 13–0 aggregate hammering of Mozambique and a 3–1 aggregate win over Algeria to qualify for the group stage, but was among the unseeded teams in its draw due to a poor FIFA ranking and found itself in Group C alongside 2018 conquerors Nigeria and two debutants, Burundi and Botswana.

South Africa began the quest for the elusive first title win by exacting revenge on Nigeria and beat them 2–1, 3–1 against Burundi and 1–0 against Botswana to top the group with perfect nine points. In the knockout stage, South Africa beat Tunisia 1–0 despite dominating the game to qualify for both the semi-finals and the 2023 FIFA Women's World Cup. They then had to rely on a last-minute injury-time penalty to overcome the emerging African women's force Zambia 1–0 in the semi-finals to progress to its 6th and back-to-back final.

== Match ==
=== Details ===
23 July 2022
21:00

Morocco	1–2	South Africa
Ayane 80'	Report (FIFA); Report (CAF)	Magaia 63', 71'

Prince Moulay Abdellah Stadium, Rabat
Attendance: 50,000
Referee: Salima Mukansanga (Rwanda)

Morocco	South Africa

GK	1	Khadija Er-Rmichi
RB	17	Hanane Aït El Haj
CB	21	Yasmin Mrabet
CB	5	Nesryne El Chad
LB	2	Zineb Redouani	(substituted off) 59'
RM	18	Sanaâ Mssoudy	(substituted off) 76'
CM	6	Élodie Nakkach	(substituted off) 76'
LM	7	Ghizlane Chebbak (c)
CF	20	Imane Saoud	(substituted off) 55'
CF	23	Rosella Ayane
CF	11	Fatima Tagnaout
Substitutions:
FW	16	Samya Hassani	(substituted on) 55'
DF	15	Ghizlane Chhiri	(substituted on) 59'
MF	10	Najat Badri	(substituted on) 76'
FW	9	Ibtissam Jraïdi	(substituted on) 76'
Manager:
(France) Reynald Pedros

GK	16	Andile Dlamini
RB	2	Lebogang Ramalepe	(yellow card) 35'
CB	13	Bambanani Mbane
CB	4	Noko Matlou
LB	7	Karabo Dhlamini
RM	9	Noxolo Cesane
CM	15	Refiloe Jane (c)
CM	14	Nomvula Kgoale		(substituted off) 70'
LM	10	Linda Motlhalo
AM	8	Hildah Magaia		(substituted off) 83'
CF	12	Jermaine Seoposenwe
Substitutions:
MF	19	Kholosa Biyana		(substituted on) 70'
FW	17	Melinda Kgadiete		(substituted on) 83'
Manager:
Desiree Ellis

Woman of the Match: Ghizlane Chebbak (Morocco)

Assistant referees:

- Fanta Koné (Mali)
- Mimisen Iyorhe (Nigeria)

Fourth official:

- Maria Rivet (Mauritius)

Reserve assistant referee:

Video assistant referee:

- Haythem Guirat (Tunisia)

Assistant video assistant referees:

- Ahmed El-Ghandour (Egypt)
- Ahmed Ibrahim (Egypt)

Match rules

- 90 minutes.
- 30 minutes of extra time if necessary.
- Penalty shoot-out if scores still level.
- Maximum of three substitutions, with a fourth allowed in extra time.

== Aftermath ==
Following the final and at the 6th attempt, South Africa became the 3rd country after Nigeria and Equatorial Guinea to win the title and join Nigeria as the only countries to have won both the male and female AFCONs despite the loss of talisman Thembi Kgatlana to injury.

The successful participation of Morocco as the host nation despite defeat was considered as a watershed moment for women's football in North Africa and the Arab world in general, as women have long suffered from gender discrimination and neglect by their various governments. Prior to the final, the country's incredible tournament form received widespread acclaim for becoming the first Arab country to qualify for the FIFA Women's World Cup. In addition, fan atmosphere and attendance in the final helped elevate the status of the Moroccan women's team.

The final was attended by the presidents of CAF, South African Football Association (SAFA) and Royal Moroccan Football Federation (FRMF), Dr. Patrice Motsepe, Danny Jordaan and Fouzi Lekjaa respectively. Various African male and female legends also attended the final. For the female legends, there were four-time African Women's Footballer of the Year Perpetua Nkwocha and past winners including Mercy Akide (2001), Alberta Sackey (2002), Adjoa Bayor (2003), Genoveva Añonma (2012), Gaelle Enganamouit (2015) and Ajara Nchout Njoya. The male legends including Samuel Eto'o, Kalusha Bwalya, Lucas Radebe, Jay-Jay Okocha, Wael Gomaa, El Hadji Diouf and Emmanuel Adebayor were also in attendance. Following the final, Motsepe declared that the final "will change women's football forever".
