= Nigeria women's national football team results =

Nigeria

The Nigeria women's national football team is the representative women's association football team of Nigeria. Its governing body is the Nigeria Football Federation (NFF) and it competes as a member of the Confederation of African Football (CAF).

This is a list of the Nigeria women's national football team results and scheduled fixtures from 2022 to the present.

== Results ==
Legend

Win Draw Lose Fixture

=== 2022 ===
April 8 Friendly	Canada	2–0	Nigeria	Vancouver, Canada
19:30 UTC−7	Fleming 51'; Gilles 72'	Report		Stadium: BC Place; Referee: Lizzet Amairany García Olvera (Mexico)

11 April Friendly	Canada	2–2	Nigeria	Langford, Canada
19:30 UTC−7	Sinclair 49'; Zadorsky 88'	Report	Onumonu 5'; Ajibade 53'	Stadium: Starlight Stadium; Referee: Crystal Sobers (Trinidad and Tobago)

4 July 2022 2022 AFWCON GS	Nigeria	1–2	South Africa	Rabat, Maroc
18:00	Ajibade 90+2'		Seoposenwe 61'; Magaia 63'	Stadium: Stade Moulay Hassan; Referee: Bouchra Karboubi (Morocco)

7 July 2022 2022 AFWCON GS	Botswana	0–2	Nigeria	Rabat, Maroc
21:00			Onumonu 21'; Ucheibe 48'	Stadium: Stade Moulay Hassan; Referee: Letticia Viana (Eswatini)

10 July 2022 2022 AFWCON GS	Nigeria	4–0	Burundi	Rabat, Maroc
21:00	Ajibade 25' (pen.); Efih 28'; Kanu 29', 46'			Stadium: Stade Moulay Hassan; Referee: Fatima El Ajjani (Morocco)

14 July 2022 2022 AFWCON QF	Cameroon	0–1	Nigeria	Casablanca, Morocco
18:00		Report (FIFA)	Ajibade 56'	Stadium: Stade Mohammed V Referee: Akhona Makalima (South Africa)

18 July 2022 2022 AFWCON SF	Morocco	1–1 (a.e.t.) (5–4 p)	Nigeria	Rabat, Morocco
	Mssoudy 66'		Mrabet 62' (o.g.)	Stadium: Prince Moulay Abdellah Stadium; Referee: Maria Rivet (Mauritania)
	Penalties
	Mrabet (penalty scored); Chebbak (penalty scored); Redouani (penalty scored); El Chad (penalty scored); Ayane (penalty scored)		(penalty scored) Chikwelu; (penalty missed) Onumonu; (penalty scored) Otu; (penalty scored) Plumptre; (penalty scored) Monday

22 July 2022 2022 AFWCON 3rd place	Nigeria	0–1	Zambia	Stade Mohammed V, Casablanca, Morocco
			Nnadozie 29' (o.g.)	Stadium: Stade Mohammed V Referee: Vincentia Enyonam (Togo)

3 September Friendly	United States	4–0	Nigeria	Kansas City, Kansas
13:00 ET	Smith 14', 45+1'; Horan 25'; Morgan 52' (pen.)			Stadium: Children's Mercy Park; Attendance: 14,502; Referee: Melissa Borjas (Honduras)

6 September Friendly	United States	2–1	Nigeria	Washington, D.C.
18:00 ET	Demehin 24' (o.g.); Lavelle 66'		Kanu 50'	Stadium: Audi Field; Attendance: 18,869; Referee: Odette Hamilton (Jamaica)

6 October Friendly	Japan	2–0	Nigeria	Kobe, Japan
16:28 UTC+9	Tanaka 64', 68' (pen.)	Report (JFA); Report (JFA)		Stadium: Noevir Stadium Kobe; Attendance: 1,671; Referee: Kate Jacewicz (Australia)

=== 2023 ===
7 April Friendly	Nigeria	2–1	Haiti	Antalya, Turkey
16:00 UTC+3	Okoronkwo 45+1'; Oshoala 57'		Dumornay 75'	Stadium: Mardan Sports Complex

11 April Friendly	New Zealand	0–3	Nigeria	Antalya, Turkey
16:00 UTC+3		Report	Ebi 34'; Echegini 49'; Oparanozie 90+5'	Stadium: Mardan Sports Complex; Referee: Arda Kardeşler (Turkey)

15 July Unofficial friendly	Lions FC	1–8	Nigeria	Gold Coast, Australia
16:00 UTC+3		Report	Oshoala; Onumonu; Payne; Ajibade; Ayinde; Kanu; Monday	Attendance: 0
Note: Behind-closed-doors training match (rolling subs and no caps)

21 July FIFA WC Group	Nigeria	0–0	Canada	Melbourne, Australia
12:30 UTC+10		Report		Stadium: Melbourne Rectangular Stadium; Attendance: 21,410; Referee: Lina Lehtovaara (Finland)

27 July FIFA WC Group	Australia	2–3	Nigeria	Brisbane, Australia
20:00 UTC+10	Van Egmond 45+1'; Kennedy 90+10'	Report	Kanu 45+6'; Ohale 65'; Oshoala 72'	Stadium: Lang Park; Attendance: 49,156; Referee: Esther Staubli (Switzerland)

31 July FIFA WC Group	Republic of Ireland	0–0	Nigeria	Brisbane, Australia
20:00 UTC+10		Report		Stadium: Lang Park; Attendance: 24,884; Referee: Katia García (Mexico)

7 August FIFA WC R16	England	0–0 (a.e.t.) (4–2 p)	Nigeria	Brisbane, Australia
17:30 UTC+10		Report		Stadium: Lang Park; Attendance: 49,461; Referee: Melissa Borjas (Honduras)
	Penalties
	Stanway (penalty missed); England (penalty scored); Daly (penalty scored); Greenwood (penalty scored); Kelly (penalty scored)		(penalty missed) Oparanozie; (penalty missed) Alozie; (penalty scored) Ajibade; (penalty scored) Ucheibe

22 September 2024 AFWCON qualification First round	Nigeria	Cancelled	São Tomé and Príncipe
16:00 WAT

25 September 2024 AFWCON qualification First round	São Tomé and Príncipe	Cancelled	Nigeria
17:00 WAT

25 October 2023 2024 Olympic qualifying	Ethiopia	1–1	Nigeria	Addis Ababa, Ethiopia
15:30 UTC+3	Amare 6'		Ajibade 52'	Stadium: Abebe Bikila Stadium

31 October 2024 Olympic qualifying	Nigeria	4–0 (5–1 agg.)	Ethiopia	Abuja, Nigeria
	Kanu 45+1'; Ajibade 50'; Oshoala 68'; Ajibade 72'			Stadium: Moshood Abiola National Stadium
Note: Nigeria won 5–1 on aggregate

30 November 2023 2024 AFWCON qualification Second round 1st leg	Nigeria	5–0	Cape Verde	Lagos, Nigeria
16:00 UTC+1	Kanu 7', 45+1'; Monday 25'; Okoronkwo 66', 77'	Report (NFF)		Stadium: Onikan Stadium

5 December 2023 2024 AFWCON qualification Second round 2nd leg	Cape Verde	1–2 (1–7 agg.)	Nigeria	Praia
	Fortes 8'		Okoronkwo 62'; Ajibade 90+3'	Stadium: Estádio Nacional de Cabo Verde
Note: Nigeria won 7–1 on aggregate.

=== 2024 ===
23 February 2024 2024 Olympic qualifying	Cameroon	0–0	Nigeria	Douala Cameroon
				Stadium: Stade de la Réunification

26 February 2024 2024 Olympic qualifying	Nigeria	1–0 (1–0 agg.)	Cameroon	Abuja, Nigeria
	Okoronkwo 15'			Stadium: Moshood Abiola National Stadium
Note: Nigeria won 1–0 on aggregate.

5 April 2024 2024 Olympic qualifying	Nigeria	1–0	South Africa	Abuja, Nigeria
17:00 UTC+1		Report		Stadium: MKO Abiola Stadium; Referee: Ghada Mehat (Algeria)

9 April 2024 2024 Olympic qualifying	South Africa	0–0 (0–1 agg.)	Nigeria	Pretoria, South Africa
19:30 UTC+2		Report	Ajibade 43' (pen.)	Stadium: Loftus Versfeld Stadium; Referee: Dorsaf Ganouati (Tunisia)
Note: Nigeria won 1–0 on aggregate.

17 July 2024 Friendly	Nigeria	0–1	Canada	Marbella, Spain
		Report	Huitema 18'	Stadium: La Quinta Football Centre

25 July 2024 2024 Olympic Games GS	Nigeria	0–1	Brazil	Bordeaux, France
				Stadium: Stade de Bordeaux

28 July 2024 2024 Olympic Games GS	Spain	1–0	Nigeria	Nantes, France
19:00		Report		Stadium: Stade de la Beaujoire

31 July 2024 2024 Olympic Games GS	Japan	3–1	Nigeria	Nantes, France
				Stadium: Stade de la Beaujoire

26 October 2024 Friendly	Nigeria	2–0	Algeria	Lagos, Nigeria
16:00 UTC+1	Ajibade 24', 45+2'	Report (FAF)		Stadium: Remo Stars Stadium

29 October 2024 Friendly	Nigeria	4–1	Algeria	Lagos, Nigeria
14:00 UTC+1	Ijamilusi 9', 18', 86'; Monday 45'		Alouache 41'	Stadium: Remo Stars Stadium

30 November 2024 Friendly	France	2–1	Nigeria	Angers, France
21:10 UTC+1	Le Sommer 29'; Majri 37'	Report	Onumonu 45+3'	Stadium: Stade Raymond Kopa; Referee: Riem Hussein (Germany)

=== 2025 ===
3 June Friendly	Nigeria	2−0	Cameroon	Abeokuta, Nigeria
16:00 UTC+1	Ajibade 28' (pen.), 43'	Report		Stadium: MKO Abiola Stadium

23 June Friendly	Portugal	0−0	Nigeria	Amadora, Portugal
19:00 UTC+1		Report	Demehin (yellow card) 76'	Stadium: Estádio José Gomes; Referee: Ainara Acevedo (Spain); Player of the Match: Beatriz Fonseca (Portugal)

29 June Friendly	Ghana	1−3	Nigeria	Mohammedia, Morocco
17:00 UTC+1	Kusi 88' (pen.)	Report	Ihezuo 34'; Oshoala 44' (pen.); Ajibade 50'	Stadium: Ziaida Sports Complex

6 July CAF WAFCON 2024 GS	Nigeria	3−0	Tunisia	Casablanca, Morocco
17:00 UTC+1	Oshoala 4'; Abiodun (yellow card) 22'; Babajide 45+1'; Ihezuo 84'; Demehin (yellow card) 86'	Report		Stadium: Larbi Zaouli Stadium; Referee: Suavis Iratunga (Burundi)

10 July CAF WAFCON 2024 GS	Botswana	0-1	Nigeria	Casablanca, Morocco
20:00 UTC+1		Report	Ihezuo 89'	Stadium: Larbi Zaouli Stadium; Referee: Aline Umutoni (Rwanda)

13 July CAF WAFCON 2024 GS	Nigeria	0-0	Algeria	Casablanca, Morocco
20:00 UTC+1		Report		Stadium: Larbi Zaouli Stadium; Referee: Antsino Twanyanyukwa (Namibia)

18 July CAF WAFCON 2024 QF	Nigeria	5–0	Zambia	Casablanca, Morocco
18:00	Ohale 2'; Okoronkwo 33'; Ihezuo 45'; Demehin 68'; Ijamilusi 90+1'	Report		Stadium: Larbi Zaouli Stadium; Referee: Bouchra Karboubi (Morocco)

22 July CAF WAFCON 2024 SF	Nigeria	2–1	South Africa	Casablanca, Morocco
18:00	Ajibade 45' (pen.); Alozie 90+4'	Report	Motlhalo 60'	Stadium: Larbi Zaouli Stadium; Referee: Shamirah Nabadda (Uganda)

26 July CAF WAFCON 2024 Final	Morocco	2–3	Nigeria	Rabat, Morocco
21:00	Chebbak 12'; Mssoudy 24'	Report	Okoronkwo 64' (pen.); Ijamilusi 71'; Echegini 88'	Stadium: Olympic Stadium; Referee: Antsino Twanyanyukwa (Namibia)

24 October CAF WAFCON 2026 qualifying	Benin	0-2	Nigeria	Lomé (Togo)
15:00 UTC+1		Report (FIFA)	Ihezuo 25'; Okoronkwo 45+2'	Stadium: Stade de Kégué; Referee: Fatou Ngum (Gambia)

28 October CAF WAFCON 2026 qualifying	Nigeria	1-1	Benin	Abeokuta
16:00 UTC+1	Plumptre 12'	Report (FIFA)	Djibril 61'	Stadium: MKO Abiola Stadium; Referee: Dominique Hanjavola (Madagascar)
Note: Nigeria won 3–1 on aggregate.

=== 2026 ===
28 February Friendly	Cameroon	1–0	Nigeria	Yaoundé, Cameroon
16:00 UTC+1	Mbomozomo 90'			Stadium: Military Stadium

3 March Friendly	Cameroon	1–3	Nigeria	Yaoundé, Cameroon
16:00 UTC+1	Meva 7'		Ihezuo 26'; Babajide 43'; Alozie 64'	Stadium: Military Stadium

5 June Friendly	Nigeria	2–1	Senegal	Ikenne, Nigeria
15:00 UTC+0	Oshoala 32' (pen.); Payne 41'	Report	Pène 86'	Stadium: Remo Stars Stadium; Referee: Juliet Appiah (Ghana)

8 June Friendly	Nigeria	3–0	Senegal	Ikenne, Nigeria
15:00 UTC+0	Omewa 49', 53'; Oshoala 66'	Report		Stadium: Remo Stars Stadium

23 July Friendly	Nigeria	2–1	Tanzania	Casablanca, Morocco
18:00 (UTC+01:00)	Ajibade 15'; Okoronkwo 89'	Report	Clement 79'	Stadium: Lenoria Sports Complex

28 July 2026 WAFCON GS	Nigeria	2–3	Malawi	Rabat, Morocco
21:00 (UTC+01:00)	Ajibade 90+2'; Kanu 90+9'		Chaŵinga 73', 90+5'; Chaŵinga 79'	Stadium: Al Medina Stadium; Referee: Aline Umutoni (Rwanda)

1 August 2026 WAFCON GS	Nigeria	1–0	Zambia	Rabat, Morocco
21:00 (UTC+01:00)	Oshoala 8'			Stadium: Al Medina Stadium; Referee: josephine wanjiku (Football Kenya Federation)

5 August 2026 WAFCON GS	Egypt	2–6	Nigeria	Rabat, Morocco
21:00 (UTC+01:00)	Ghazi 45+9' (pen.), 84'		Oshoala 21' (pen.); Monday 45+1'; Kanu 57'; Ucheibe 81' (pen.); Ajibade 90+1' (pen.); Omewa 90+9'	Stadium: Rabat Olympic Stadium; Referee: Aline Umutoni (Rwanda)

9 August CAF WAFCON 2026 QF	Cameroon	1–0	Nigeria	Casablanca, Morocco
18:00 (UTC+01:00)	Nyadjou 19'			Stadium: Larbi Zaouli Stadium; Referee: Antsino Twanyanyukwa (Namibia)

13 August CAF WAFCON 2026 PIM	South Africa	2–1	Nigeria	Casablanca, Morocco
21:00 (UTC+01:00)	Kgatlana 56'; Jane 77'		Ucheibe 90+3' (pen.)	Stadium: Moulay Rachid Stadium; Referee: Aline Guimbang Etong (Cameroon)

9 October 2028 Summer Olympic qualifying	Comoros	0–2	Nigeria	Ikenne, Nigeria
18:00 (UTC+01:00)			Alozie 48'; Kanu 60'	Stadium: Remo Stars Stadium; Referee: Henriette Byukusenge (Rwanda)

13 October 2028 Summer Olympic qualifying	Nigeria	v	Comoros
