= Asubo Ladies FC =

Ugandan women's association football club

Asubo Ladies FC is a Ugandan professional Women football team competing in the FUFA Women Elite League.

== History ==
Asubo Ladies FC started as Gafford Girls Soccer Academy which then was renamed to Gafford Girls FC, Gafford Ladies FC, Asubo Gafford Ladies FC and now Asubo Ladies FC.

Asubo Ladies FC was founded on 28 November 2012 by Henry Barungi and William Gafford.

They became a club in 2013 and in 2014, the Federation of Uganda Football Associations (FUFA) started a Women's Football League named FUFA Women Elite League and Gafford Girls FC was among the pioneer clubs.

=== 2021 ===
Asubo Gafford FC under Wanyama Benjamin, got promoted to the FUFA Women Super League when they topped their group and got automatic qualification to the league.

=== 2022 ===
The club requested FUFA to change the name from Asubo Gafford Ladies FC to Asubo Ladies FC, which is their current name.

=== 2023 ===
Asubo Ladies FC registered their first victory in the FUFA Women Super League against UCU Lady Cardinals FC in 2023 in a match that ended 1:0 scored by Aziiza Amulem.

They survived relegation on the final day but in 2024, they were relegated to the FUFA Women Elite League.

== Achievements ==
Asubo Ladies FC won the FUFA Women Beach Soccer League in 2023. They won a silver medal in 2022 for the FUFA Women Elite League, Bronze medal in 2018. They also won a silver medal in the FUFA Women Cup for the 2017 campaign.
