= Sandra Nabweteme =

Ugandan footballer (born 1996)

Personal information
- Date of birth: 1 November 1996 (age 30)
- Place of birth: Kampala, Uganda
- Height: 1.60 m (5 ft 3 in)
- Position: Left winger

Team information
- Current team: Santos Laguna
- Number: 8

College career
Years	Team	Apps	(Gls)
2016–2019	SWOSU Bulldogs	60	(65)

Senior career*
Years	Team	Apps	(Gls)
2014–2016	Kawempe Muslim	23	(40)
2021	Þór/KA	7	(3)
2021	→ FH (loan)	8	(2)
2022–2023	Hapoel Petah Tikva	25	(7)
2023–2024	Kdz. Ereğli Belediye Spor	30	(10)
2024–	Santos Laguna	37	(12)

International career
2019–	Uganda		
- * Club domestic league appearances and goals as of 5 February 2026

Sandra Nabweteme (born 1 November 1996) is a Ugandan professional footballer who plays as a left winger for Liga MX Femenil club Santos Laguna and the Uganda women's national team.

She played college football for the Southwestern Oklahoma State University from 2016 to 2019 where she won multiple accolades. In 2015, she was named the FUFA Female Player of the Year.

== Early life ==
Nabweteme was raised in Kampala. She started training football at the age of five and played with the local boys teams until she turned 14 years old. She was invited to the Kawempe Muslim where she continued to play football.

== College career ==
Nabweteme played for Southwestern Oklahoma State University in the United States from 2016 to 2019 and graduated with a degree in Engineering Physics in November 2020.

== Club career ==
=== Kawempe Muslim ===
Nabweteme played two seasons with Kawempe Muslim in the then Uganda top-tier FUFA Women Elite League. She led the league in goals scored both seasons, with 17 goals in 9 games in her first season and 23 goals in 14 games in her second, propelling Kawempe to the championship both times.

=== Þór/KA ===
In March 2021, Nabweteme signed with Þór/KA of the Icelandic Úrvalsdeild kvenna. On 20 July 2021, she was loaned to 1. deild kvenna club FH for the rest of the season after having appeared in 7 league matches with Þór/KA, where she scored 3 goals.

== International career ==
In 2019, Nabweteme played for the Uganda national team in the 2020 CAF Women's Olympic Qualifying Tournament.

== Career statistics ==
=== International goals ===
Scores and results list Uganda goal tally first

No.	Date	Venue	Opponent	Score	Result	Competition
1	3 October 2021	Gelvandale Stadium, Port Elizabeth, South Africa	Eswatini	3–1	5–1	2021 COSAFA Women's Championship

== Personal life ==
Nabweteme's mother, Angela Nabukeera, played for the Kampala United in the early 2000s.

== Honours ==
=== Club ===
- FUFA Women Elite League champion: 2015, 2016
- GAC Tournament champions: 2017, 2019

=== Individual ===
- FUFA Female Player of the Year: 2015
- FUFA Women Elite League top goal scorer: 2015, 2016
- GAC Tournament MVP: 2019
- First Team All-GAC selection: 2016, 2017, 2018, 2019
- GAC Freshman of the Year: 2016
- GAC Offensive of the Year: 2019
- GAC top goal scorer: 2019

Sporting positions
Preceded by (United States) Bethany Sutherland (Harding University)	GAC Freshman of the Year; 2016	Succeeded by (United States) Hannah White (Oklahoma Baptist University)
Preceded by (United States) Ruth King (Oklahoma Baptist University)	GAC Offensive Player of the Year; 2019	Succeeded by Incumbent
