= Mamy Ndiaye =

Senegalese footballer (born 1986)

Personal information
- Date of birth: 26 November 1986 (age 39)
- Place of birth: Pikine, Senegal
- Position: Forward

Senior career*
Years	Team	Apps	(Gls)
2008–2012	IFK Kalmar		
2014–2015	Transportes Alcaine	24	(4)
2015 –	Inter Arras FCF		

International career^{‡}
- Senegal
- * Club domestic league appearances and goals ‡ National team caps and goals as of 11 october 2014 (before the 2012 African Women's Championship)

Mamy Ndiaye (born 26 November 1986 in Pikine) is a Senegalese women's international footballer who plays as a forward. She is a member of the Senegal women's national football team, and has played for IFK Kalmar in Sweden, Zaragoza CFF in Spain and Inter Arras FCF in France.

== Early life ==
Mamy Ndiaye was born on 26 November 1986 in Pikine, Senegal. She is the daughter of former Senegalese football international Nguessiam Ndiaye, and her mother was an athlete. She credited her father for both her interest in association football as well as inheriting his ability at the sport.

== Career ==
=== Club ===
When Ndiaye signed for Swedish side IFK Kalmar in 2008, she became the first female Senegalese football player to turn professional. She remained with the team until 2012, during which time she scored 110 times in all competitions. Ndiaye joined Kalmar while it was in the fourth division, and remained in the first team as it rose to the top division. She was the top goalscorer in the league during the 2012 season, when Kalmar finished in fifth place. She then transferred to Spanish side Zaragoza CFF for the following season before moving during 2015 to the French side Inter Arras FCF. Arras has refused to release Ndiaye for a match against Guinea in the 2016 Africa Women Cup of Nations qualification.

=== International ===
Ndiaye plays for the Senegal women's national football team, including at the 2010 African Women's Championship qualification and 2012 African Women's Championship. The 2012 AWC was the first time that the Senegal women's team qualified, with Ndiaye captaining the team at the tournament.
