= Nguenar Ndiaye =

Senegalese footballer (born 1995)

Personal information
- Date of birth: 10 January 1995 (age 31)
- Place of birth: Mbour, Senegal
- Position: Forward

Team information
- Current team: Bourges Foot 18
- Number: 9

Senior career*
Years	Team	Apps	(Gls)
- Dorades de Mbour
2018-2020	AFA Grand-Yoff	12	(29)
2020–2021	AS Dakar Sacré-Cœur	6	(8)
2021–	Bourges Foot 18	65	(60)

International career
2016–	Senegal	60	(31)
- * Club domestic league appearances and goals

Nguenar Ndiaye (born 10 January 1995) is a Senegalese professional footballer who plays as a forward for Division 3 Féminine club Bourges Foot 18 and the Senegal national team.

== Club career ==
Ndiaye began playing football at a young age, often with boys in her neighborhood. Her talent was spotted by Jean-Pierre "Tchampou" Corréa of Dorades de Mbour as a goalkeeper, who convinced her family to support her career. She started with Dorades, later joined AFA in Dakar, and in 2020 moved to Dakar Sacré-Cœur during the Division 1 play-offs. The following year, she represented the club in the inaugural 2021 CAF Women's Champions League WAFU Zone A Qualifiers, where she finished as joint top scorer.

In May 2023, She led the club to the Coupe Centre-Val de Loire Féminine title with a hat-trick in a 12–1 trashing of SMOC. At the end of the 2024–25 Division 3 Féminine season, she finished as the league's top scorer with 19 goals, capping off an impressive campaign.

== International career ==
Following a strong performance in the 2022 Women's Africa Cup of Nations qualifiers, where she emerged as Senegal's top scorer with four goals, she was named in the squad for the final tournament held in Morocco in July 2022. She played a decisive role in the team's shootout victory against Tunisia during the Repechage, helping Senegal secure their first-ever appearance in the Inter-confederation play-offs. She was named Player of the Match for her performance. She continued to showcase her goalscoring ability following her debut appearance at the WAFCON, netting in friendly matches and playing a key role in helping Senegal secure back-to-back qualification for the 2024 edition of the tournament.

== International goals ==
Scores and results list Senegal's goal tally first, score column indicates score after each Ndiaye goal.

List of international goals scored by Nguenar Ndiaye
No.	Date	Venue	Opponent	Score	Result	Competition
1	16 March 2018	Jules François Bocandé Technical Centre, Toubab Dialaw, Senegal	Morocco	2–3	2–3	Friendly
2	21 December 2019	Stade Lat-Dior, Thiès, Senegal	Gambia	1–0	4–2	Friendly
3	21 December 2019	Stade Lat-Dior, Thiès, Senegal	Gambia	2–0	4–2	Friendly
4	21 December 2019	Stade Lat-Dior, Thiès, Senegal	Gambia	4–1	4–2	Friendly
5	4 March 2020	Bo Stadium, Bo, Sierra Leone	Liberia	1–0	2–1	2020 WAFU Zone A Women's Cup
6	26 October 2021	Stade Lat-Dior, Thiès, Senegal	Liberia	2–0	6–0	2022 WAFCON qualifying
7	26 October 2021	Stade Lat-Dior, Thiès, Senegal	Liberia	3–0	6–0	2022 WAFCON qualifying
8	26 October 2021	Stade Lat-Dior, Thiès, Senegal	Liberia	4–0	6–0	2022 WAFCON qualifying
9	16 February 2022	Stade Lat-Dior, Thiès, Senegal	Mali	1–0	1–0	2022 WAFCON qualifying
10	23 June 2022	Stade Lat-Dior, Thiès, Senegal	Guinea-Bissau	1–0	3–0	Friendly
11	3 July 2022	Prince Moulay Abdellah Stadium, Rabat, Morocco	Uganda	2–0	2–0	2022 Women's Africa Cup of Nations
12	13 July 2022	Stade Mohammed V, Casablanca, Morocco	Zambia	1–0	1–1	2022 Women's Africa Cup of Nations
13	25 January 2023	Estádio Marcelo Leitão, Espargos, Cape Verde	Sierra Leone	1–0	4–0	2023 WAFU Zone A Women's Cup
14	25 January 2023	Estádio Marcelo Leitão, Espargos, Cape Verde	Sierra Leone	2–0	4–0	2023 WAFU Zone A Women's Cup
15	27 January 2023	Estádio Marcelo Leitão, Espargos, Cape Verde	Guinea-Bissau	1–0	4–0	2023 WAFU Zone A Women's Cup
16	14 July 2023	Stade Lat-Dior, Thiès, Senegal	Algeria	2–1	3–1	Friendly
17	18 July 2023	Stade Lat-Dior, Thiès, Senegal	Algeria	1–0	4–0	Friendly
18	18 July 2023	Stade Lat-Dior, Thiès, Senegal	Algeria	4–0	4–0	Friendly
19	22 September 2023	Stade Lat-Dior, Thiès, Senegal	Mozambique	1–1	1–1	2024 WAFCON qualifiying
20	25 September 2023	Stade Lat-Dior, Thiès, Senegal	Mozambique	2–1	2–1	2024 WAFCON qualifiying
21	30 November 2023	Stade Lat-Dior, Thiès, Senegal	Egypt	2–0	4–0	2024 WAFCON qualifiying
22	16 July 2024	Stade Lat-Dior, Thiès, Senegal	DR Congo	2–0	2–0	Friendly
23	27 October 2024	Père Jégo Stadium, Casablanca, Morocco	Tanzania	1–1	1–1	Friendly
24	1 July 2025	Mustapha Tchaker Stadium, Blida, Algeria	Algeria	1–0	3–0	Friendly
25	6 July 2025	El Bachir Stadium, Mohammedia, Morocco	DR Congo	2–0	4–0	2024 Women's Africa Cup of Nations
26	6 July 2025	El Bachir Stadium, Mohammedia, Morocco	DR Congo	4–0	4–0	2024 Women's Africa Cup of Nations
27	9 July 2025	El Bachir Stadium, Mohammedia, Morocco	Zambia	1–0	2–3	2024 Women's Africa Cup of Nations
28	9 July 2025	El Bachir Stadium, Mohammedia, Morocco	Zambia	2–3	2–3	2024 Women's Africa Cup of Nations
29	13 October 2026	Leopold Sédar Senghor Stadium, Dakar, Senegal	Tunisia	1–0	2–0	
30	13 October 2026	Leopold Sédar Senghor Stadium, Dakar, Senegal	Tunisia	2–0	2–0	

== Honours ==
Senegal

- WAFU Zone A Women's Cup: 2020, 2023
