= Ndeye Awa Diakhaté =

Senegalese footballer (born 1997)

Personal information
- Date of birth: 2 January 1997 (age 29)
- Place of birth: Richard Toll, Senegal
- Height: 1.66 m (5 ft 5 in)
- Positions: Forward; attacking midfielder

Team information
- Current team: Marseille
- Number: 10

Senior career*
Years	Team	Apps	(Gls)
–2020	Amazones Grand Yoff		
2020–2022	Dakar Sacré-Cœur		
2022	Le Puy	11	(8)
2022–	Marseille	28	(9)

International career^{‡}
2020–	Senegal	14	(5)
- * Club domestic league appearances and goals as of 27 October 2025. ‡ National team caps and goals as of 22 February 2022.

Ndeye Awa Diakhaté (born 2 January 1997) is a Senegalese footballer who plays as a forward for Seconde Ligue club Marseille and the Senegal women's national team.

== Club career ==
Diakhaté has played for AFA Grand Yoff in Dakar, Senegal and for Le Puy in France.

== International career ==
Diakhaté capped for Senegal at senior level during the 2022 Africa Women Cup of Nations qualification.

== International goals ==
No.	Date	Venue	Opponent	Score	Result	Competition
1.	20 October 2021	Samuel Kanyon Doe Sports Complex, Paynesville, Liberia	Liberia	2–0	2–1	2022 Women's Africa Cup of Nations qualification
2.	26 October 2021	Stade Lat-Dior, Thiès, Senegal	Liberia	1–0	6–0	2022 Women's Africa Cup of Nations qualification
3.	23 June 2022	Stade Lat-Dior, Thiès, Senegal	Guinea-Bissau	3–0	3–0	Friendly
4.	3 July 2022	Prince Moulay Abdellah Stadium, Rabat, Morocco	Uganda	1–0	2–0	2022 Women's Africa Cup of Nations
5.	21 February 2023	Waikato Stadium, Hamilton, New Zealand	Thailand	1–1	1–1	Friendly

== Honours ==
=== Club ===
Amazones

- Senegalese Championship (1): 2019

Dakar

- Senegalese Championship (1): 2021

=== International ===
Senegal

- WAFU Zone A Women's Cup (1): 2020
