= Toubab Dialaw =

Village in Senegal

- Town
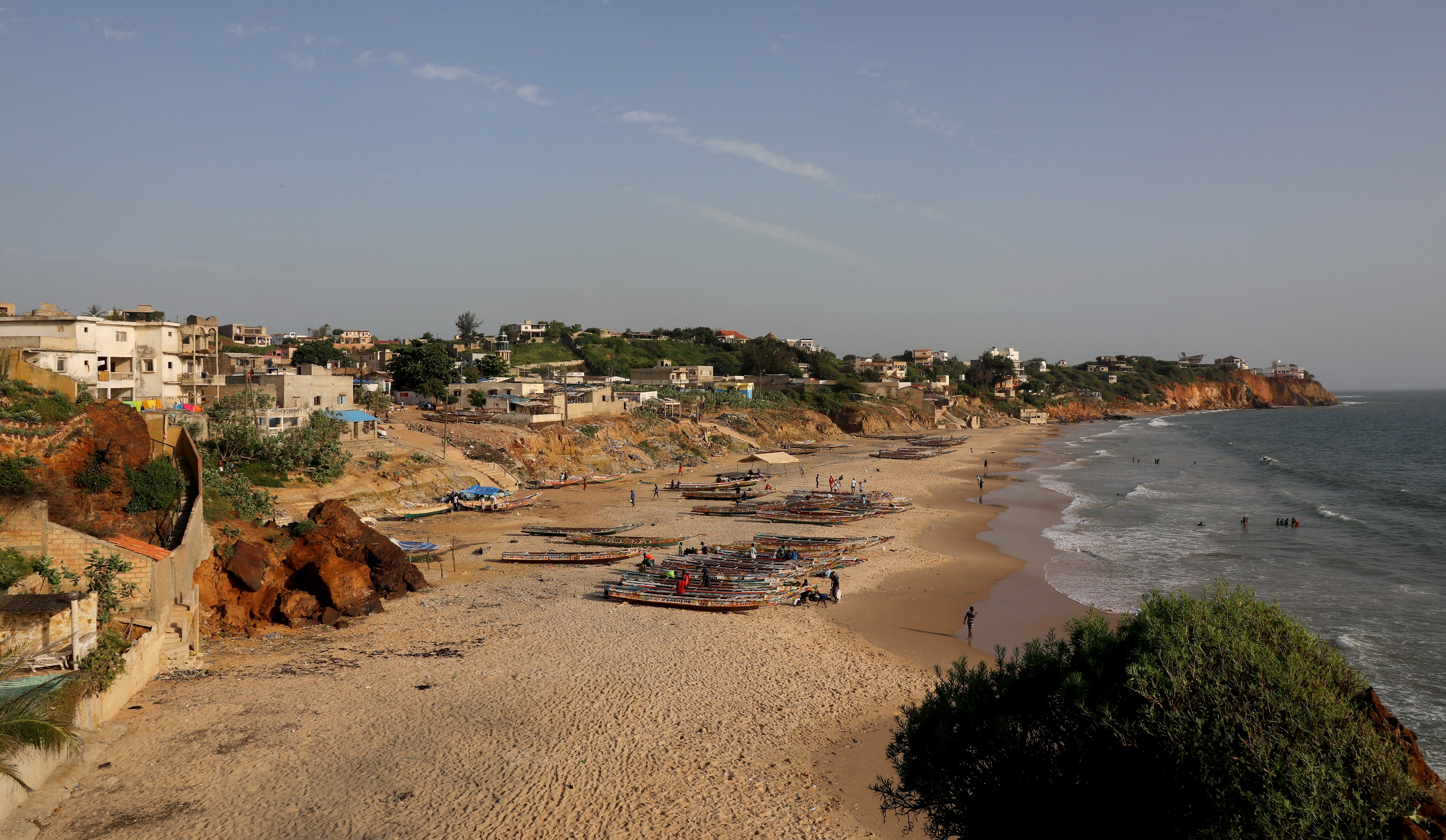

- Location within Senegal
- Coordinates: 14°36′22″N 17°9′01″W
- Country: Senegal
- Region: Thiès Region

Area
  - Total: 2 km^{2} (0.77 sq mi)
- Elevation: 1 m (3.3 ft)
- Time zone: UTC+0 (GMT)

Toubab Dialo (or Toubab Dialaw) is a village in Senegal, located on the Petite Côte, south of Dakar, between Bargny, Senegal and Popenguine. It is part of the rural community of Yenne, the department of Rufisque and the region of Dakar.

== Geography ==
The nearest villages are Yene Tode, Daga and Popenguine-Ndayane.

== History ==
According to legend - told by tourist guides - El Hadj Omar Tall (Omar Saidou Tall) who founded the Toucouleur Empire - came to this village and caused a source of fresh water to spring up on the beach, which was seen as miraculous.

== Economy ==
A fishing village leaning against the cliff, Toubab Dialo is now turning to tourism, thanks to an environment conducive to swimming and walking.

Abdoul Rahim Ba is the founder of Biodialaw network in Toubab Dialaw. It is an "ecological oasis" that trains young people, women and communities in ecological organic farming techniques.

== Culture ==
The village is home to the École des Sables, an international center for traditional and contemporary African dances created in 1998 and run by Senegalese choreographer Germaine Acogny. The school is a center for education, modern dance, traditional and contemporary African dances. Ben Beye a Senegalese director filmed parts of the film "Latricia's Dream" in Touba Dialaw at the École des Sables.

The K'you is an art gallery with a guesthouse in Toubab Dialaw.

Gerard Chenet is an architect, writer, and the founder and designer of Espace Sobo Bade. It is a place for cultural exchange. He was born in Haiti and came to Senegal in 1964. He founded Sobo Bade in 1970. Space Sobo Bade is a cultural centre, artists community, and a guesthouse.

== Gallery ==
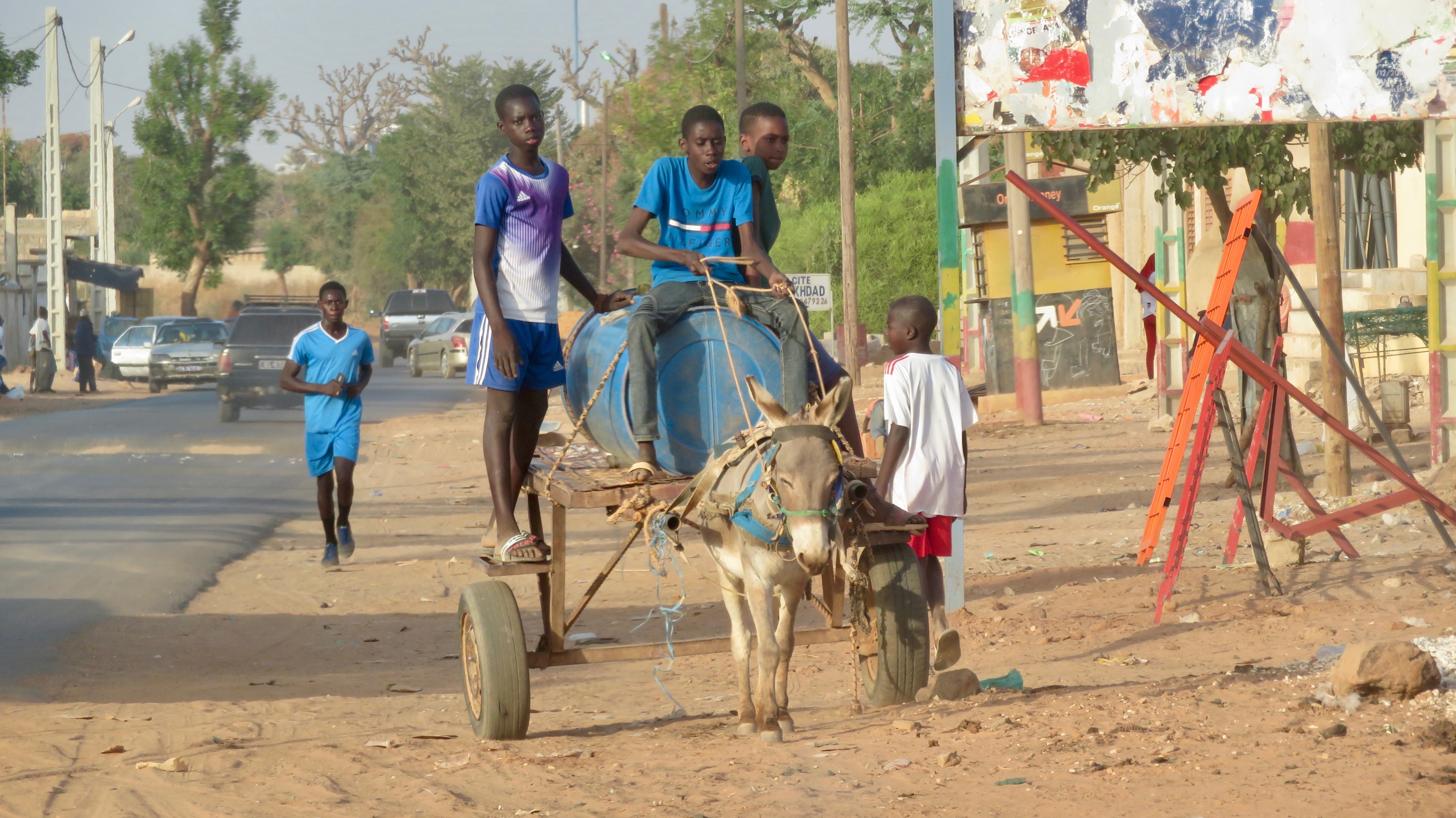

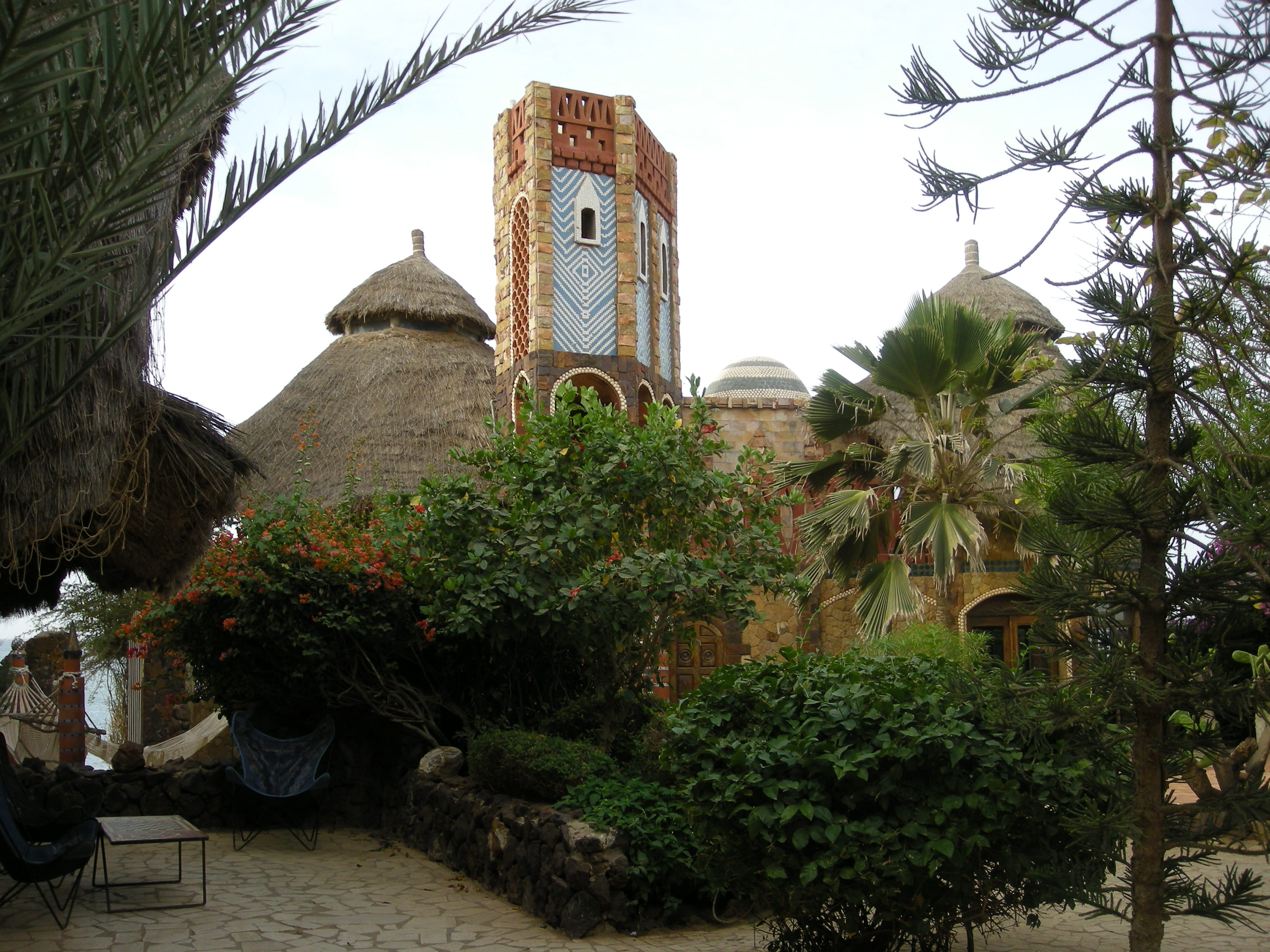

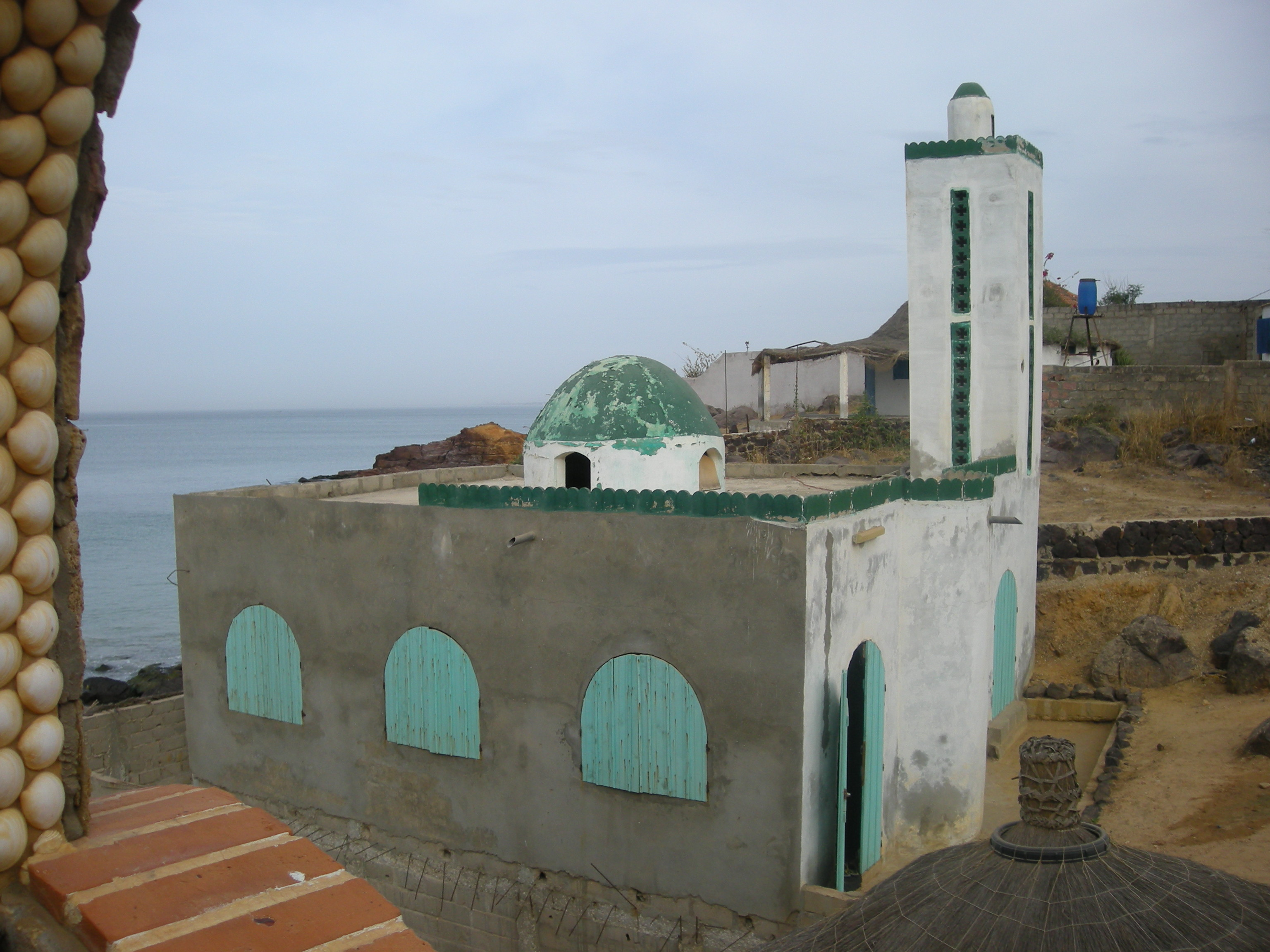

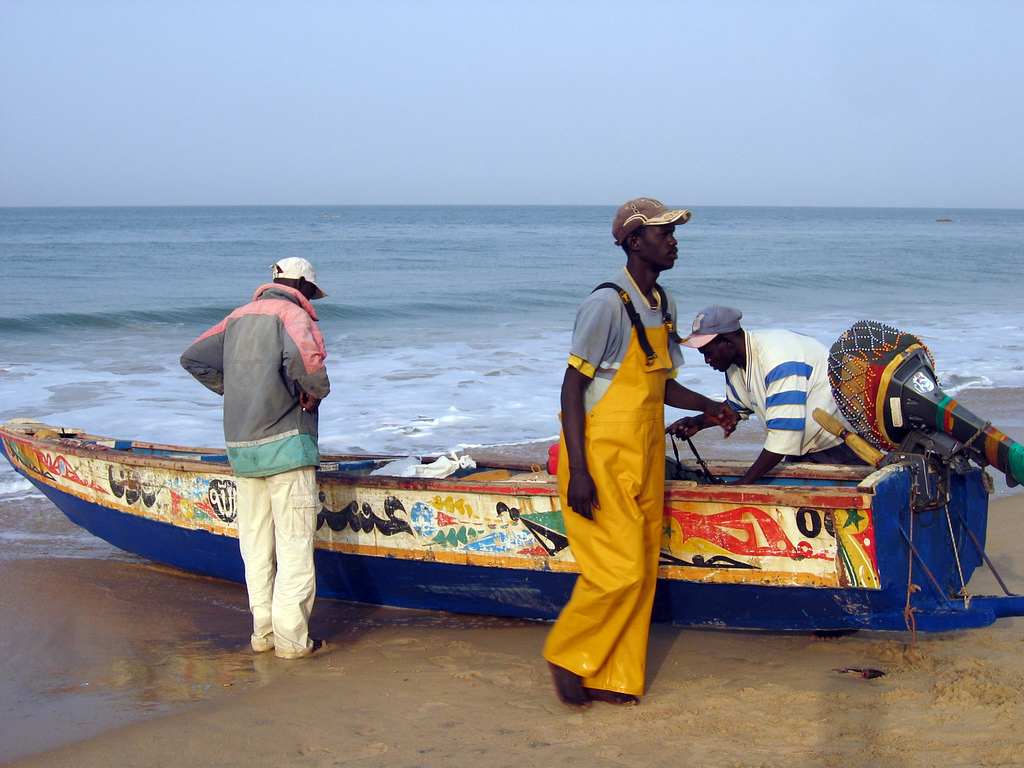

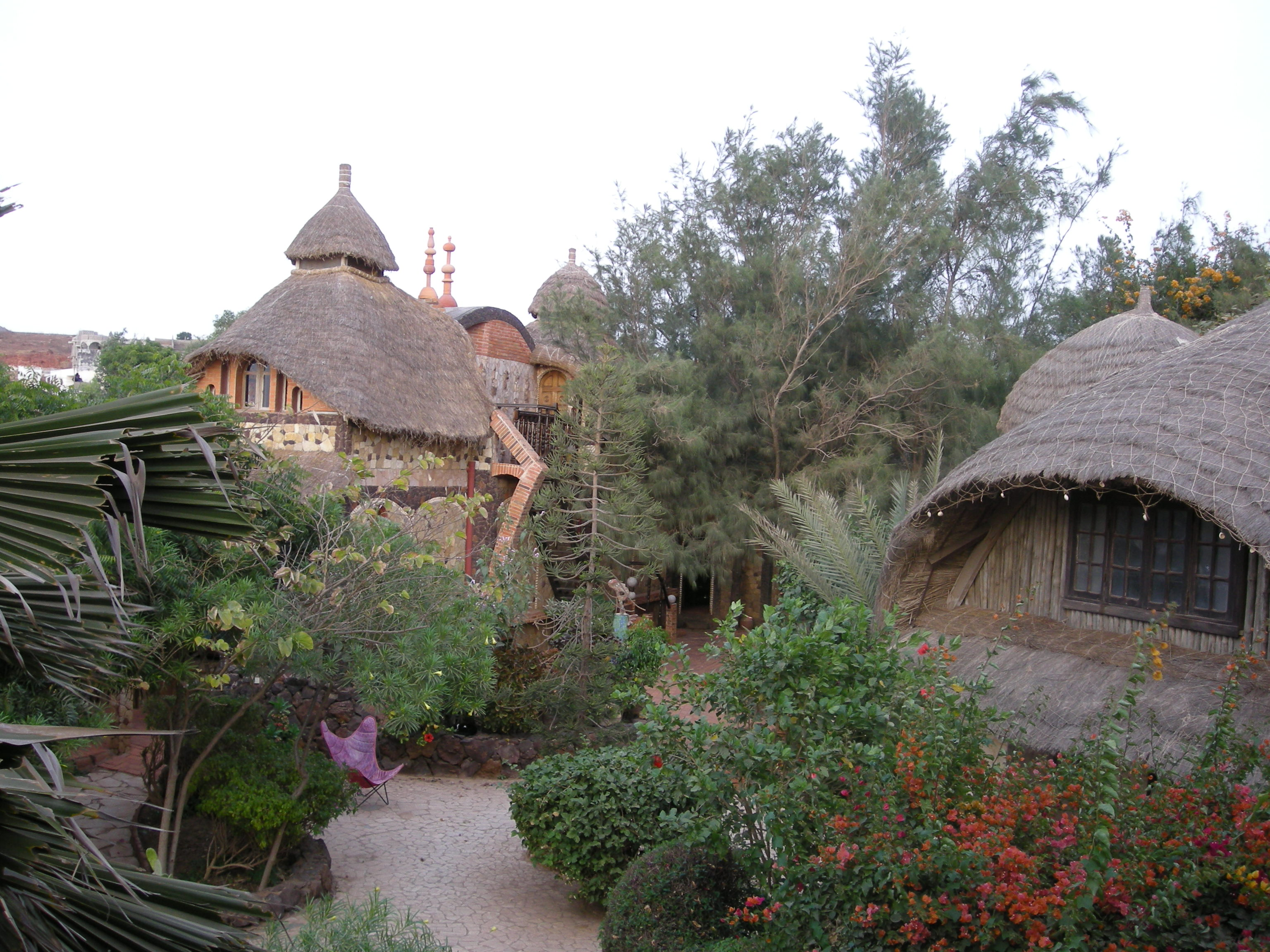

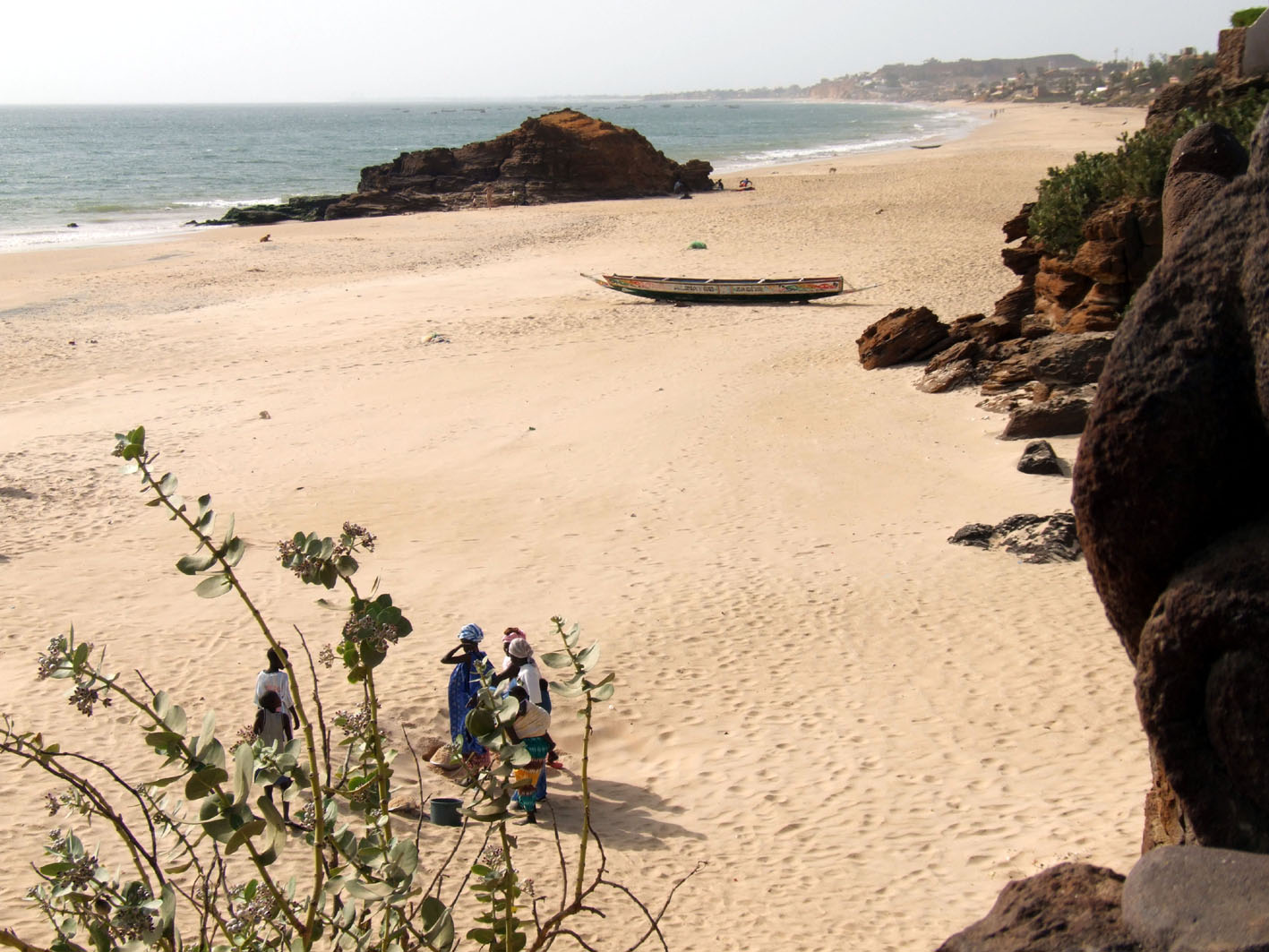

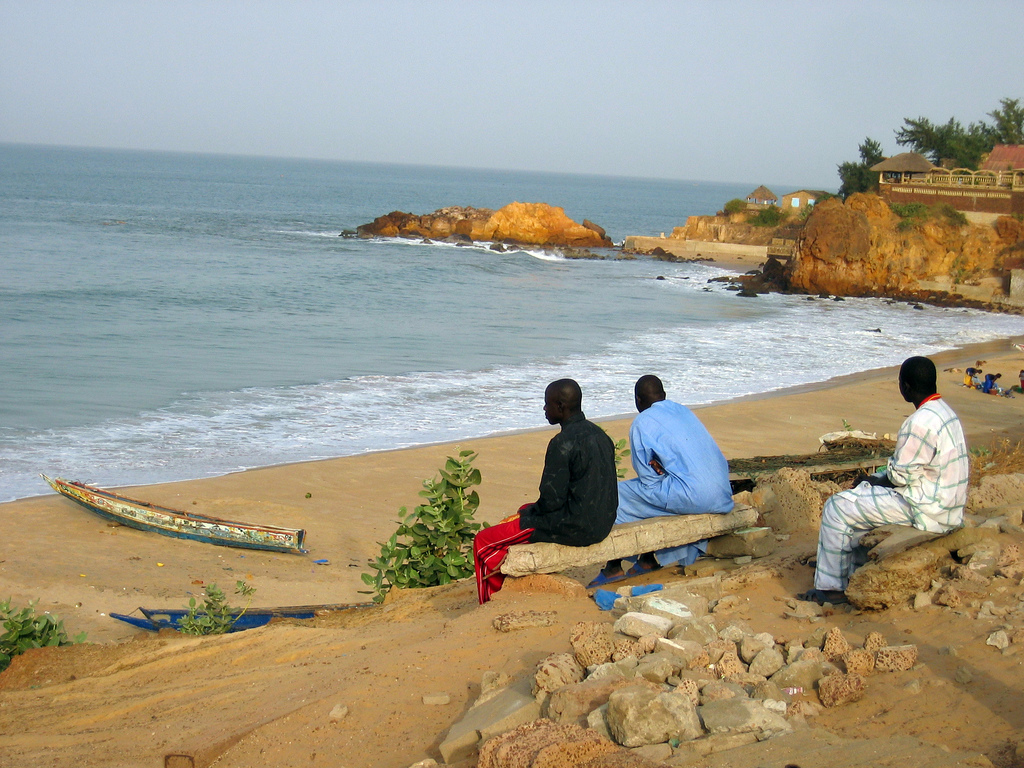

== Population ==
The village had 2,210 inhabitants in 2003. In 2013, there were 2,915 people. They are mainly Lebou, but Serer also live there.

== Notable people ==
- Gerard Chenet
- Germaine Acogny
- Sylvain Durif

== See also ==
- Batik, drumming and dancing
- School Des Sables
- Omar Saidou Tall
- Cities Outside of Dakar
