= FUFA Women Elite League =

- Founded: 2015; 11 years ago
- Country: Uganda
- Confederation: CAF (Africa)
- Divisions: 2
- Number of clubs: 8
- Level on pyramid: 2
- Promotion to: FUFA Women Super League

FUFA Women Elite League is a women's football league in Uganda sanctioned by the Federation of Uganda Football Associations (FUFA). Until the 2019–20 season, the league was the top-flight women's football league in Uganda. The FUFA Women Super League succeeded the Women Elite League as the top women's football league in the country.

== History ==
The establishment of the FUFA Women Elite League in 2015 followed Uganda's stint at the African qualifiers of the 2014 FIFA U-20 Women's World Cup where it won in a two-legged preliminary round match over South Sudan on a 22–0 aggregate. However the Federation of Uganda Football Associations (FUFA) withdrew the national team from the qualifiers since it deemed "improper" to continue its campaign if there is no women's league in the country.

The introduction of the Women Super League to the Ugandan women's football system as the new highest women's football league for the 2019–20 season relegated the FUFA Women Elite League as a second division league reducing the number of competing teams in the Elite League from 16 to 8. Due to the COVID-19 pandemic, the 2019–20 season of the Women Elite League was cancelled with Isra Soccer Academy (Victoria group) and Makerere University (Elizabeth group) promoted to the Women Super League for the 2020–21 season.

== Final playoff results ==
- 2015: Kawempe 3-2 Buikwe
- 2015–16: Kawempe Muslim 0-0 (4–2 pen) She Corporates
- 2016–17: Kawempe Muslim 4-0 UCU Cardinals
- 2017–18: Kawempe Muslim 1-0 Olila Women
- 2018–19: UCU Lady Cardinals 2-0 Lady Dove
- 2019–20: Not held
