= Safietou Sagna =

Senegalese footballer (born 1994)

Personal information
- Date of birth: 11 April 1994 (age 32)
- Place of birth: Laty, Casamance, Senegal
- Height: 1.72 m (5 ft 8 in)
- Position: Midfielder

Team information
- Current team: US Saint-Malo
- Number: 12

Senior career*
Years	Team	Apps	(Gls)
2008–2017	Casa Sports		
2016–2019	Lycée Ameth Fall		
2019–2021	USPA		
2021–2022	Bourges Foot 18		
2022–2024	FC Metz	17	(1)
2024–	US Saint-Malo	16	(0)

International career
2011–	Senegal	71	(1)
- * Club domestic league appearances and goals

Safietou Sagna (born 11 April 1994) is a Senegalese professional footballer who plays as midfielder for Seconde Ligue club US Saint-Malo and captains the Senegalese national football team.

== Club career ==
Sagna began her football journey playing with boys in her neighborhood before participating in UASSU school tournaments. On the recommendation of friends, she enrolled in two football academies: Tapha at CEMT and Aicha, where she quickly honed her skills. She went on to join Casa Sports, one of Senegal's well-known clubs, where she spent the majority of her early career from 2008 until 2017. Starting that year, she played for Lycée Ameth Fall in Saint-Louis and continued to do so for three years. she also represented Union Sportive des Parcelles Assainies, further solidifying her presence in the domestic football scene.

On 25 June 2021, Régional 1 side Bourges Foot 18 announced the signing of the Senegalese captain, marking her first move abroad.

In December 2022, she joined French club FC Metz of the Division 2 Féminine during the winter transfer window.

In August 2024, she joined fellow Seconde Ligue side US Saint-Malo as a free agent.

== International career ==
Sagna began representing Senegal at senior level in 2011 at the age of 17. A year later, she was named in the final squad for the country's debut appearance at the continental tournament. On 28 October 2012, she made her tournament debut, coming on as a substitute for Khady F. Sall in the 54th minute during a 0–1 defeat to DR Congo. On 15 February 2018, she scored her first international goal in Senegal's opening match of the tournament on the 28th minute, contributing to a 6–0 victory over Togo.

=== International goals ===
As of match played 31 May 2025
Senegal score listed first, score column indicates score after each Sagna goal

List of international goals scored by Safietou Sagna
No.	Date	Venue	Opponent	Score	Result	Competition
1	15 February 2018	Stade Félix Houphouët-Boigny, Abidjan, Ivory Coast	Togo	3–0	6–0	2018 WAFU Zone B Cup
2	16 March 2018	Stade Alassane Djigo, Pikine, Senegal	Morocco	1–0	1–0	Friendly

== Honours ==
Senegal

- WAFU Zone A Women's Cup: 2020, 2023
