= Stade Lat-Dior =

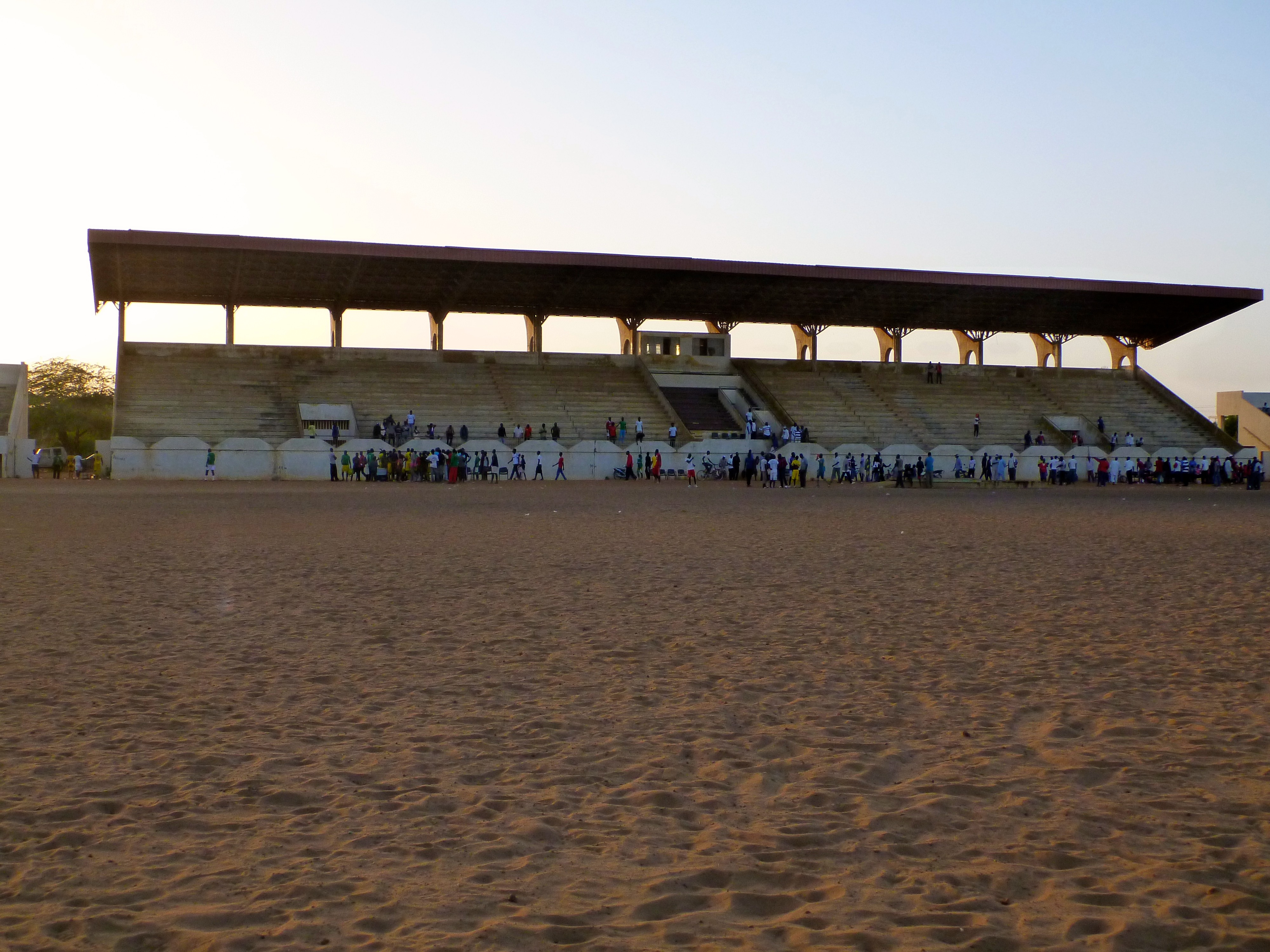

- Location within Senegal
- Coordinates: 14.769775°N 16.9443346°W
- Capacity: 8,712

Tenant
- Senegal national football team

The Stade Lat Dior, also known as the Thies stadium, is a multi-sports stadium in Thiès, Senegal. The stadium is named in honour of Lat Jor.

It has a capacity of 8,712 spectators. The capacity was 20,000 before the installation of individual seats.
