= Mbayang Sow =

Senegalese footballer (born 1993)

Personal information
- Date of birth: 21 January 1993 (age 33)
- Place of birth: Dakar, Senegal
- Height: 1.75 m (5 ft 9 in)
- Position: Defender

Team information
- Current team: Marseille
- Number: 8

Senior career*
Years	Team	Apps	(Gls)
- Aigles Médina
2015–2016	Lillers	8	(3)
2017–2018	Yzeure	3	(0)
- Parcelles Assainies
2022–	Marseille	29	(0)

International career
- Senegal
- * Club domestic league appearances and goals as of 16 May 2024

Mbayang Sow (born 21 January 1993) is a Senegalese footballer who plays as a defender for Seconde Ligue club Marseille and the Senegal women's national team.

She played for Senegal at the 2012 African Women's Championship. During the match against DR Congo, she was shown a red card for a handball in the penalty area.
