= Mama Diop =

Senegalese footballer (born 1994)

Personal information
- Date of birth: 9 October 1994 (age 32)
- Place of birth: Guéréo, Thiès, Senegal
- Height: 1.85 m (6 ft 1 in)
- Position: Forward

Team information
- Current team: Saint-Malo
- Number: 99

Senior career*
Years	Team	Apps	(Gls)
- Lycée Ameth Fall
2016–2017	Condé		
2017–2018	Orvault		
2019	Toulouse	11	(5)
2019–2020	Arras	11	(3)
2020–2022	Lens	27	(18)
2022–2025	Marseille	49	(32)
2025–2026	Strasbourg	17	(3)
2026–	Saint Malo	4	(1)

International career^{‡}
2014–	Senegal	4	(3)
- * Club domestic league appearances and goals as of 16 October 2026 ‡ National team caps and goals as of 21:45, 17 July 2022 (UTC)

Mama Diop (born 9 October 1994) is a Senegalese professional footballer who plays as a forward for Première Ligue club Saint-Malo and the Senegal national team.

== Club career ==
Diop has played for Lycée Ameth Fall in Senegal and for FCF Condéen, Orvault SF, Toulouse FC, Arras FCF and Lens in France.

== International career ==
Diop capped for Senegal at senior level during the 2014 Africa Women Cup of Nations qualification.
