= Yasmin Mrabet =

Moroccan footballer (born 1999)

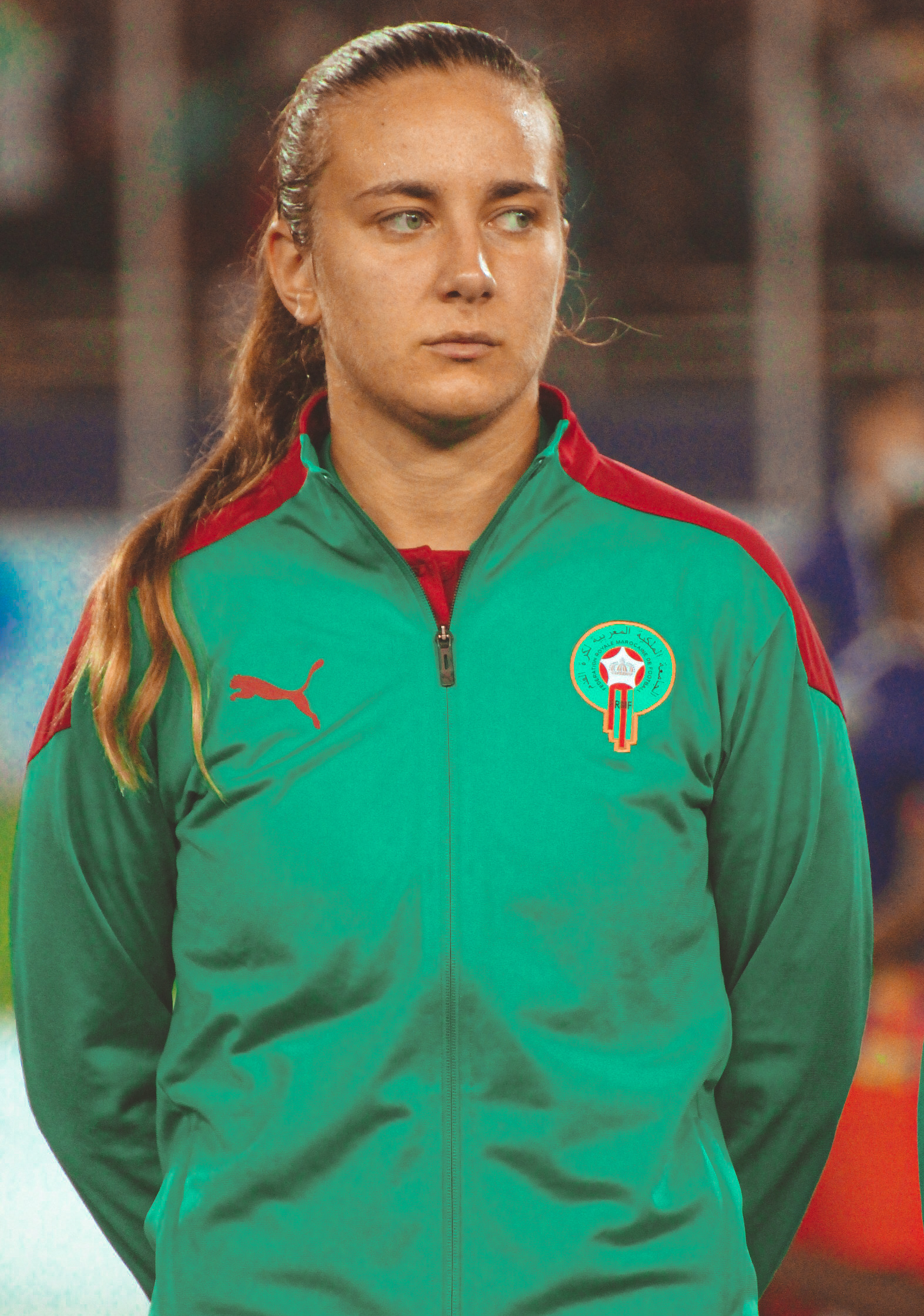
- Mrabet with Morocco at the 2022 Women's Africa Cup of Nations

Personal information
- Full name: Yasmin-Katie M'rabet
- Birth name: Yasmin Katie Mrabet Slack (Note: In this Spanish name, the first or paternal surname is Mrabet and the second or maternal family name is Slack.)
- Date of birth: 8 August 1999 (age 27)
- Place of birth: Madrid, Spain
- Height: 1.79 m (5 ft 10 in)
- Positions: Midfielder; centre-back

Team information
- Current team: Valencia
- Number: 21

Youth career
- 2014–2015: Madrid CFF

Senior career*
| Years | Team | Apps | (Gls) |
| 2014–2020 | Madrid CFF B | 8+ | (1+) |
| 2015–2020 | Madrid CFF | 51+ | (1+) |
| 2020–2021 | Rayo Vallecano | 9 | (0) |
| 2021–2024 | Levante Las Planas | 64 | (10) |
| 2024– | Valencia | 29 | (4) |

International career^{‡}
| 2018 | Spain U19 | | |
| 2021– | Morocco | | |
Medal record
Women's football
Representing Spain
UEFA Women's Under-19 Championship
| First place | 2018 Switzerland |
Representing Morocco
Women's Africa Cup of Nations
| Second place | 2022 Morocco |
- * Club domestic league appearances and goals as of 3 March 2023 ‡ National team caps and goals as of 5 December 2023

Yasmin-Katie M'rabet (Arabic: ياسمين-كاتي مرابط; born 8 August 1999) is a professional footballer who plays as a midfielder for Valencia. Born in Spain, she operates as a centre-back for the Morocco national team. She previously represented her country of birth at under-19 level.

== Early life ==
Mrabet was born in Madrid to a Moroccan father and an English mother. She is fluent in Spanish, English, French and Catalan.

== Club career ==
Mrabet has played for Madrid CFF, Rayo Vallecano and Levante Las Planas in Spain.

As a teenager, Mrabet was a regular in the Madrid CFF side playing in the Liga Iberdrola and made over 50 appearances in the top-flight before leaving to join Rayo Vallecano in 2020. However, following a serious injury shortly after her arrival, her debut for her new club would only come in February 2021.

In the 2021–22 season, Mrabet scored eight goals in 27 appearances to help Levante Las Planas win the Reto Iberdrola title and earn promotion to the Liga F for the following season.

She continued to be a regular starter for the club on their return to the top-flight.

== International career ==
Mrabet represented Spain at the 2018 UEFA Women's Under-19 Championship, winning a gold medal. She later switched allegiance to Morocco and made her senior debut on 30 November 2021 as a starter in a 2–0 friendly home win over Senegal.

Mrabet was selected for the 2022 Women's Africa Cup of Nations in Morocco and, on 13 July 2022, she scored the winning goal in the quarterfinal match against Botswana which allowed Morocco to qualify for its first time ever to the FIFA Women's World Cup (2023 edition).

Her second goal for Morocco came at the 2023 Turkish Women's Cup in a 3–0 victory over Slovakia.

== Honours ==
Levante Las Planas

- Segunda División Pro: 2021–22

Spain U19

- UEFA Women's Under-19 Championship: 2018

Morocco

- Women's Africa Cup of Nations runner-up: 2022, 2024

== Career statistics ==
=== Club ===
As of match played 2 March 2023

Appearances and goals by club, season and competition
| Club | Season | League | | | Cup | | League Cup | | Continental | | Total | |
| Club | Season | Division | Apps | Goals | Apps | Goals | Apps | Goals | Apps | Goals | Apps | Goals |
|---|---|---|---|---|---|---|---|---|---|---|---|---|
| Madrid CFF | 2017-18 | Primera División | 23 | 0 | 0 | 0 | 0 | 0 | 0 | 0 | 23 | 0 |
| Madrid CFF | 2018-19 | Primera División | 15 | 0 | 0 | 0 | 0 | 0 | 0 | 0 | 15 | 0 |
| Madrid CFF | 2019–20 | Primera División | 12 | 1 | 0 | 2 | 0 | 0 | 0 | 0 | 12 | 1 |
| Rayo Vallecano | 2020–21 | Primera División | 9 | 0 | 0 | 0 | 0 | 0 | 0 | 0 | 9 | 0 |
| Levante Las Planas | 2021–22 | Segunda División | 27 | 8 | 0 | 0 | 0 | 0 | 0 | 0 | 27 | 8 |
| Levante Las Planas | 2022-23 | Primera División | 14 | 0 | 0 | 0 | 0 | 0 | 0 | 0 | 14 | 0 |
| Career total | | | 100 | 9 | 2 | 0 | 0 | 0 | 0 | 0 | 102 | 9 |

== International goals ==
| No. | Date | Venue | Opponent | Score | Result | Competition |
|---|---|---|---|---|---|---|
| 1. | 7 April 2022 | Prince Moulay Abdellah Stadium, Rabat, Morocco | Gambia | 1–0 | 6–1 | Friendly |
| 2. | 13 July 2022 | Prince Moulay Abdellah Stadium, Rabat, Morocco | Botswana | 2–1 | 2–1 | 2022 Women's Africa Cup of Nations |
| 3. | 17 February 2023 | Arslan Zeki Demirci Sports Complex, Antalya, Turkey | Slovakia | 3–0 | 3–0 | Friendly |
| 4. | 29 October 2024 | Père Jégo Stadium, Casablanca, Morocco | Senegal | 2–0 | 7–0 | Friendly |
| 5. | 4 April 2025 | Père Jégo Stadium, Casablanca, Morocco | Tunisia | 1–0 | 3–1 | Friendly |
| 6. | 9 July 2025 | Rabat Olympic Stadium, Rabat, Morocco | DR Congo | 4–2 | 4–2 | 2024 Women's Africa Cup of Nations |
| 7. | 12 July 2025 | Rabat Olympic Stadium, Rabat, Morocco | Senegal | 1–0 | 1–0 | 2024 Women's Africa Cup of Nations |
| 8. | 27 February 2026 | Al Medina Stadium, Rabat, Morocco | Burkina Faso | 4–0 | 5–0 | Friendly |

== See also ==
- List of Morocco women's international footballers
