= Liberia women's national football team results =

This article lists the results and fixtures for the Liberia women's national football team.

Nicknamed the "Lone Star," like their male counterparts, the team represents Liberia in international women's association football. It is governed by the Liberia Football Association (LFA) and competes as a member of the Confederation of African Football (CAF).

The team made its international debut in 2007 during the qualifiers for the 2008 Summer Olympics. Liberia's first match was a 0–3 home defeat against Ethiopia on February 18, 2007. In the other hand, their first official win came on February 26, 2020, with a 4–0 win over Guinea-Bissau in the WAFU Zone A Women's Cup. As of 6 March 2025, Liberia is ranked 167th in the FIFA Women's World Ranking.

== Record per opponent ==
Key

Positive balance (more wins than losses)
Neutral balance (as many wins as losses)
Negative balance (more losses than wins)

The following table shows Liberia's all-time official international record per opponent:

Opponent	Pld	W	D	L	GF	GA	GD	W%	Confederation
Cape Verde	3	1	0	2	3	6	−3	33.33	CAF
Ethiopia	2	0	0	2	0	5	−5	00.00	CAF
Gambia	1	1	0	0	2	1	+1	100.00	CAF
Ghana	2	0	0	2	0	11	−11	00.00	CAF
Guinea	3	1	2	0	8	5	+3	33.33	CAF
Guinea-Bissau	2	2	0	0	7	1	+6	100.00	CAF
Mali	3	1	1	1	2	4	−2	33.33	CAF
Mauritania	1	0	1	0	1	1	±0	00.00	CAF
Senegal	4	0	0	4	2	11	−9	00.00	CAF
Sierra Leone	3	1	2	0	5	3	+2	33.33	CAF
Total (10 Opponents)	24	7	6	11	30	48	−18	29.17	

Last update : Mali v Liberia, May 31, 2025

== Results ==
This section details all-time results of the Liberia senior women's national team against other senior national teams, including both FIFA-sanctioned matches and unofficial fixtures such as those played in the Mano River Union Tournament.

=== 2007 ===
February 18 2008 Summer Olympics qualifying	Liberia	0–3	Ethiopia	Monrovia
				Stadium: Antoinette Tubman Stadium

March 10 2008 Summer Olympics qualifying	Ethiopia	2–0	Liberia	Addis Ababa, Ethiopia

=== 2011 ===
February 13 2011 African Games qualifying	Liberia	0–4	Ghana	Monrovia

February 27 2011 African Games qualifying	Ghana	7–0	Liberia	Accra, Ghana

=== 2014 ===
March 8 Friendly match	Sierra Leone	0–0	Liberia	Makeni, Sierra Leone

=== 2019 ===
November 24 Friendly match	Liberia	3–3	Guinea	Monrovia
16:00 GMT	Agbotsu 28'; Massaquoi 45', 68'	Report	Conteh 9', 51'; Sylla 38'	Stadium: Antoinette Tubman Stadium; Referee: Sylvina Garnett (Liberia)

December 18 Friendly match	Sierra Leone	2–2	Liberia	Makeni, Sierra Leone
	Sesay; Mohai		Nimene; Sayee 90+'	Referee: Sylvina Garnett (Liberia)

=== 2020 ===
February 26 WAFU Zone A Cup	Liberia	4–0	Guinea-Bissau	Makeni, Sierra Leone
16:30 GMT	Massaquio 13'; Willie 43'; Kieh 45+1' (pen.); Kikeh 72'			Stadium: Wusum Sports Stadium

February 28 WAFU Zone A Cup	Mali	3–0	Liberia	Makeni, Sierra Leone
14:00 GMT	Sidibe 31'; B. Diarra 43'; A. Diarra 78'			Stadium: Wusum Sports Stadium

March 2 WAFU Zone A Cup	Gambia	1–2	Liberia	Makeni, Sierra Leone
14:00 GMT	Tamba 60'		Sayee 1'; Stewart 14'	Stadium: Wusum Sports Stadium

March 4 WAFU Zone A Cup SF	Senegal	2–1	Liberia	Makeni, Sierra Leone
16:00 GMT	Ndiaye 18'; Diakhaté 34'		Kpan 62'	Stadium: Wusum Sports Stadium

March 7 WAFU Zone A Cup 3rd place match	Liberia	1–0	Cape Verde	Bo, Sierra Leone
14:00 GMT	Kieh 59'			Stadium: Bo Stadium

=== 2021 ===
April 26 Mano River Union Tournament	Sierra Leone	1–3	Liberia	Bo, Sierra Leone
			Kpan; Kieh; Morris	Stadium: Bo Stadium

October 20 2022 WAFCON qualifying	Liberia	1–2	Senegal	Monrovia
17:00 GMT	Kikeh 90+5'	Report	Diop 24'; Diakhaté 85'	Stadium: Samuel Kanyon Doe Sports Complex; Attendance: 50; Referee: Ana Maria Lopes (Cape Verde)

October 26 2022 WAFCON qualifying	Senegal	6–0	Liberia	Thiès
17:00 GMT	Diakhaté 4'; Ndiaye 30', 44', 45+2'; Diop 63', 67'	Report		Stadium: Stade Lat-Dior; Attendance: 175; Referee: Isatou Touray (Gambia)
Note: Senegal won 8–1 on aggregate.

=== 2023 ===
September 22 2024 WAFCON qualifying	Cape Verde	3–0	Liberia	Praia, Cape Verde
17:00 GMT	Moreira 15', 90+5'; Pereira 53'	Report		Stadium: Estádio Nacional de Cabo Verde

September 26 2024 WAFCON qualifying	Liberia	2–3	Cape Verde	Monrovia
15:30 GMT	Agbotsu 13'; Kpan 70' (pen.)	Report	Pereira 10'; Santos 23'; Borges 38'	Stadium: Samuel Kanyon Doe Sports Complex
Note: Cape Verde won 6–2 on aggregate.

=== 2024 ===
December 4 Mano River Union Tournament	Liberia	4–1	Guinea	Makeni, Sierra Leone
16:00 GMT	Kikeh 18', 36'; Glao 52'; Saryon 90+3'	Report	Samoura 75'	Stadium: Wusum Sports Stadium

December 7 Mano River Union Tournament	Guinea	1–1	Liberia	Makeni, Sierra Leone
16:00 GMT	Nabe 57'	Report	Stewart 39'	Stadium: Wusum Sports Stadium

=== 2025 ===
May 22 WAFU Zone A Cup	Guinea-Bissau	1–3	Liberia	Nouakchott, Mauritania
16:00	Iala 16'	Report	Quachie 45+3'; Eiden 63', 89'	Stadium: Stade Ksar; Referee: Félicité Kourouma (Guinea)

May 24 WAFU Zone A Cup	Liberia	1–1	Mauritania	Nouakchott, Mauritania
19:00 GMT	Morris 56'	Report	Diabira 87' (pen.)	Stadium: Cheikha Ould Boïdiya Stadium; Referee: Humu Marah (Sierra Leone)

May 26 WAFU Zone A Cup	Mali	1–1	Liberia	Nouakchott, Mauritania
16:00 GMT	Dembele 21'	Report	Yantay 45+3'	Stadium: Stade Ksar; Referee: Fatou Ngum (Gambia)

May 29 WAFU Zone A Cup SF	Senegal	1–0	Liberia	Nouakchott, Mauritania
19:00 GMT	H. Diallo 70' (pen.)	Report		Stadium: Cheikha Ould Boïdiya Stadium; Referee: Fatou Ngum (Gambia)

May 31 WAFU Zone A Cup 3rd place match	Mali	0–1	Liberia	Nouakchott, Mauritania
17:00 GMT		Report	Glao 63'	Stadium: Cheikha Ould Boïdiya Stadium; Referee: Félicité Kourouma (Guinea)

== See also ==
- Liberia women's national football team
- Liberia national football team results (2020–present)
