= Dalphine Glao =

Liberian footballer (born 2008)

Personal information
- Full name: Dalphine G. Glao
- Date of birth: January 9, 2008 (age 18)
- Place of birth: Liberia
- Position: Forward

Team information
- Current team: Real Muja FC
- Number: 7

Senior career*
Years	Team	Apps	(Gls)
–2024	Soccer Ambassadors FC		
2024–	Real Muja FC		

International career
2022–2024	Liberia U17	4	(1)
2023–	Liberia	9	(2)
Medal record
Women's football
Representing Liberia
WAFU Zone A Women's Cup
Third place	2025 Mauritania
- * Club domestic league appearances and goals

Dalphine G. Glao (born January 9, 2008) is a Liberian footballer who plays as a forward for Liberia Upper Women's Division Club Real Muja FC and the Liberia national football team.

== Club career ==
In July 2024, Real Muja of the LFA Upper Women's Division announced the signing of Glao on a three-year contract, with an option to extend for a further year. In April 2025, the striker received two major individual honors at the 2025 March Madness Tournament (MMT), being named both the tournament's Most Valuable Player (MVP) and Top Goal Scorer.

== International career ==
Glao first represented Liberia at the under-17 level, She featured in the 2022 and 2024 editions of the African U-17 Women's World Cup qualification. On 19 May 2024, she scored the decisive goal that secured Liberia's historic progression to the next round of the competition.

In September 2023, Glao received her first call-up to the senior Lone Stars squad for the 2024 Women's Africa Cup of Nations qualification matches against Cape Verde by newly appointed coach Selam Kebede, She made her senior debut on September 22, 2023, in a 0–3 loss to the Cape Verdeans. During the 2024 Mano River Union Tournament. She scored her first international goal on December 4, 2024, in a 4–1 victory over Guinea. In May 2025, she was named to Liberia's final squad for the 2025 WAFU Zone A Women's Cup. On May 31, 2025, she scored the only goal of the third place playoff to secure a 1–0 victory over Mali, clinching the bronze medal for Liberia.

=== International goals ===
Scores and results list Liberia's goal tally first, score column indicates score after each Glao goal.

List of international goals scored by Dalphine Glao
No.	Date	Venue	Opponent	Score	Result	Competition
1	December 4, 2024	Makeni, Sierra Leone	Guinea	3–0	4–1	2024 Mano River Union Tournament
2	May 31, 2025	Nouakchott, Mauritania	Mali	1–0	1–0	2025 WAFU Zone A Women's Cup
