= 1976 1. deild karla =

Icelandic football (soccer) season

The 1976 season of 1. deild karla was the 22nd season of second-tier football in Iceland.

== Standings ==
Pos	Team	Pld	W	D	L	GF	GA	GD	Pts	Promotion or qualification
1	ÍBV	16	13	2	1	63	13	+50	28	Promoted to 1977 Úrvalsdeild
2	Þór A.	16	11	4	1	47	15	+32	26	Promoted after playoff
3	Ármann	16	7	4	5	27	20	+7	18	
4	Völsungur	16	7	4	5	25	24	+1	18	
5	KA	16	5	4	7	27	33	−6	14	
6	Haukar	16	5	3	8	26	32	−6	13	
7	ÍBÍ	16	3	5	8	18	32	−14	11	
8	Selfoss	16	4	3	9	26	50	−24	11	
9	Reynir Á.	16	2	1	13	14	48	−34	5	Escaped relegation after playoff with 1976 2. deild teams.

=== Playoff for an Úrvalsdeild place ===
The team in second place in 1. deild met the team in last place in the 1976 Úrvalsdeild for a place in the 1977 Úrvalsdeild, as teams in Úrvalsdeild and 1. deild were increased from 9 to 10. Þór A. won this playoff.

Team 1	Score	Team 2
Þór A.	2–0	Þróttur R.

=== Playoff round for two 1. deild places ===
The team in last place in 1. deild met the teams in 2nd and 3rd in the 1976 2. deild in a playoff round for two 1. deild places. The team in 1st place in the 2. deild (Reynir S.) had already been promoted.

Pos	Team	Played	Points	Notes
1	Þróttur N.	2	4	Promoted
2	Reynir Á.	2	2	Escaped relegation
3	Afturelding	2	0	
