= Oulun =

Oulun may refer to:

- Oulun Energia Areena, arena in the Raksila district of Oulu, in Finland
- Oulun Kärpät, ice hockey team in the SM-liiga based in Oulu, Finland
- Oulun Luistinseura (or OLS), Finnish multi-sports club, based in Oulu
- Oulun Lyseon Lukio, Finnish school in the city of Oulu in northern Finland
- Oulun Palloseura or OPS is a Finnish multi-sports club based in Oulu
- Oulun Palloseura (football), OPS for short, is a Finnish football club based in Oulu
- Oulun Tervahiihto or Tervahiihto is an annual ski marathon held in Oulu, Finland
