= Old Fort =

Old Fort may refer to

in the Bahamas

- Old Fort Bay
- Old Fort of Nassau

in Canada

- Old Fort 217 Indian Reserve, Alberta
- Old Fort, Quebec (also known as Old Fort Bay or Vieux-Fort)

in India

- Old Fort, Delhi

in Mauritania

- Old Fort, Nouakchott

in South Africa

- Old Fort (Durban), a national heritage site

in Tanzania

- Old fort of Zanzibar

in the United States

(by state)

- Old Fort (Miami, Missouri), listed on the NRHP in Missouri
- Old Fort, North Carolina
- Old Fort, Ohio
- Old Fort, Pennsylvania
- Oldfort, Tennessee
- Old Fort, Wisconsin
- Old Fort (Savannah, Georgia)

== See also ==
- Junagarh (disambiguation)
