= Martin Wilkinson =

English football manager

Managerial career
- Years: Team
- 1982–1983: Peterborough United
- 1983: ÍBÍ
- 1999–2000: Carlisle United
- 2003: Northampton Town

Martin Wilkinson is an English football manager.

He has managed the following clubs:

- Peterborough United: 29 June 1982 – 1 February 1983
- Íþróttabandalag Ísafjarðar: 1983
- Carlisle United: 25 June 1999 – 10 May 2000
- Northampton Town: 24 February 2003 – 29 September 2003
