= Julieta Iala =

Bissau-Guinean footballer

Personal information
- Full name: Julieta Iala N'Quitcha
- Date of birth: 11 July 2007 (age 19)
- Place of birth: Guinea-Bissau
- Position: Forward

Team information
- Current team: Jappo Olympique
- Number: 10

Senior career*
Years	Team	Apps	(Gls)
2022–2025	Fidjus di Bideras TCB		

International career
2023–	Guinea-Bissau		(3)
- * Club domestic league appearances and goals

Julieta "Soares" Iala N'Quitcha (born 11 July 2007), commonly known as Julieta Iala or Julieta Yalá, is a Bissau-Guinean who plays as a striker for Senegalese Women's Championship club Jappo Olympique de Guédiawaye and the Guinea-Bissau women's national team.

== Club career ==
Julieta began her football career at Sporting Clube da Guiné-Bissau, later joining União Desportiva Internacional de Bissau, before moving to Ténis FC; now known as Fidjus di Bidera, where she won the national championship in 2022. She has been described as one of Guinea-Bissau’s most promising young goal scorers and continues to draw attention for her performances.

== International career ==
Julieta has represented Guinea-Bissau at senior level since 2023, appearing in the 2023 WAFU Zone A Women's Cup, where the team finished fourth, and the 2024 Summer Olympics qualifiers, during which she netted her first international goal in a 2–2 draw with Benin on 18 July 2023.

=== International goals ===
Scores and results list Guinea-Bissau's goal tally first, score column indicates score after each Julieta goal.

No.	Date	Venue	Opponent	Score	Result	Competition
1	14 July 2023	Estádio 24 de Setembro, Bissau, Guinea-Bissau	Benin	2–1	2–2	2024 CAF Olympic qualifying tournament
2	22 May 2025	Ksar Stadium, Nouakchott, Mauritania	Liberia	1–0	1–3	2025 WAFU Zone A Cup
3	24 May 2025	Ksar Stadium, Nouakchott, Mauritania	Mali	1–1	1–4	2025 WAFU Zone A Cup
