= 1977 1. deild karla =

Icelandic football league season

The 1977 season of 1. deild karla was the 23rd season of second-tier football in Iceland.

== League table ==
Pos	Team	Pld	W	D	L	GF	GA	GD	Pts	Promotion or relegation
1	Þróttur R. (C, P)	18	13	3	2	44	16	+28	29	Promoted to 1978 Úrvalsdeild
2	KA (P)	18	13	1	4	54	26	+28	27	Promoted to 1978 Úrvalsdeild
3	Haukar	18	9	8	1	33	15	+18	26	
4	Ármann	18	10	3	5	30	20	+10	23	
5	ÍBÍ	18	5	8	5	20	23	−3	18	
6	Þróttur N.	18	5	5	8	23	30	−7	15	
7	Völsungur	18	5	5	8	27	34	−7	15	
8	Reynir S.	18	5	5	8	24	31	−7	15	
9	Selfoss (R)	18	2	3	13	14	43	−29	7	Relegated to 1978 2. deild
10	Reynir Á. (R)	18	1	3	14	17	48	−31	5	Relegated to 1978 2. deild

Rules for classification: 1) points; 2) goal difference; 3) number of goals scored.
(C) Champions; (P) Promoted; (R) Relegated

== Top scorers ==
Scorer	Goals	Team
(Iceland) Páll Ólafsson	20	Þróttur R.
(Iceland) Gunnar Blöndal	16	KA
(Iceland) Ármann Sverrisson	14	KA
(Iceland) Ólafur Jóhannesson	13	Haukar
(Iceland) Bjarni Hafþór Helgason	12	Völsungur
(Iceland) Sigurbjörn Gunnarsson	10	KA
