= Aminata Camara (footballer) =

Guinean footballer (born 2003)

Personal information
- Date of birth: 13 November 2003 (age 22)
- Place of birth: Conakry, Guinea
- Position: Midfielder

Team information
- Current team: FUS Rabat
- Number: 6

Senior career*
Years	Team	Apps	(Gls)
- AS Kaloum
2022–2023	AGS Tanger	25	(7)
2023–2024	Chabab Rif Al Hoceima		
2024–	FUS Rabat	11	(1)

International career
2020–2021	Guinea U20	6	(2)
2021–	Guinea	6	(4)
- * Club domestic league appearances and goals as of 5 January 2025

Aminata Camara (born 13 November 2003) is a Guinean professional footballer who plays as a midfielder for Moroccan Division 1 Féminin club FUS Rabat and captains the Guinea national team.

== Club career ==
In September 2024, Camara signed with Fath US Rabat in the Moroccan Division 1 Féminin on a one-year contract.

== International career ==
Camara got her first senior team call-up in October 2021 for the 2022 Women's Africa Cup of Nations qualification match against Mali. and debuted for the team as a starter on 20 October 2021 in a 2–2 draw to the Malian side. On 21 September 2023, she scored her first international goal against Mauritius in a historic 8–0 win.

=== International goals ===
Scores and results list Guinea's goal tally first, score column indicates score after each Camara goal.

List of international goals scored by Aminata Camara
No.	Date	Venue	Opponent	Score	Result	Competition
1	21 September 2023	General Lansana Conté Stadium, Conakry, Guinea	Mauritius	7–0	8–0	2024 WAFCON qualifiers
2	26 September 2023	Côte d'Or National Sports Complex, Quatre Bornes, Mauritius	Mauritius	1–0	3–0	2024 WAFCON qualifiers
3	26 September 2023	Côte d'Or National Sports Complex, Quatre Bornes, Mauritius	Mauritius	3–0	3–0	2024 WAFCON qualifiers
4	21 February 2025	Stade Lat-Dior, Thiès, Senegal	Cape Verde	1–2	2–2	2026 WAFCON qualifiers
5	26 May 2025	Ksar Stadium, Nouakchott, Mauritania	Gambia	4–1	4–3	2025 WAFU Zone A Cup
