= Mimi Eiden =

Liberian soccer player (born 1999)

Personal information
- Full name: Mimi Janice Eiden
- Date of birth: May 2, 1999 (age 27)
- Place of birth: Liberia
- Height: 5 ft 3 in (1.60 m)
- Position: Forward

Team information
- Current team: Vestri
- Number: 10

College career
Years	Team	Apps	(Gls)
2017–2019	North Dakota Fighting Hawks	33	(28)
2020–2021	Montana Lady Griz	22	(20)

Senior career*
Years	Team	Apps	(Gls)
2022	Grindavík	24	(10)
2024–	Vestri	16	(17)

International career^{‡}
2021–	Liberia	8	(2)
- * Club domestic league appearances and goals ‡ National team caps and goals as of May 29, 2025

Mimi Janice Eiden (born May 2, 1999) is a Liberian American professional soccer player who plays as a forward for Vestri of the Icelandic 2. deild kvenna and the Liberia national team.

== Early life and College career ==
Eiden was born in Liberia and, along with her four siblings, was later adopted by a family in Minnesota. She began playing soccer at the age of six. Eiden went on to play collegiate soccer with North Dakota Fighting Hawks for three seasons, before joining Montana Lady Griz, during which she competed in NCAA Division I as part of the Summit League.

== Club career ==
In February 2022, Eiden signed her first professional contract with Icelandic side Grindavík of the Lengjudeild kvenna. In May 2024, she returned to Iceland, this time joining third-tier side Vestri, where she played a key role and contributed to one of the team's two victories during the season.

== International career ==
Eiden received her first call-up to the Liberian senior national team in October 2021 for the 2022 Women's Africa Cup of Nations qualification fixtures against Senegal. On October 20, 2021, She made her debut for the national team in a 1–2 home loss to the Lionesses of Teranga. On May 22, 2025, Mimi scored her first international goals, netting a brace to secure Liberia's win in their opener of the 2025 WAFU Zone A Women's Cup.

== Career statistics ==
As of match played May 29, 2025

Appearances and goals by national team and year
National team	Year	Apps	Goals
Liberia	2021	2	0
Liberia	2023	2	0
Liberia	2025	4	2
Total		8	2

Scores and results list Liberia's goal tally first, score column indicates score after each Eiden goal.

List of international goals scored by Mimi Eiden
No.	Date	Venue	Opponent	Score	Result	Competition
1	May 12, 2025	Nouakchott, Mauritania	Guinea-Bissau	2–1	3–1	2025 WAFU Zone A Women's Cup
2	May 12, 2025	Nouakchott, Mauritania	Guinea-Bissau	3–1	3–1	2025 WAFU Zone A Women's Cup
