= 1976 2. deild karla =

Icelandic football league season

The 1976 season of 2. deild karla was the 11th season of third-tier football in Iceland.

== Group A ==
Pos	Team	Played	Points	Notes
1	Fylkir	8	16	Advanced to final round
2	Þór Þ.	8	10	
3	Grindavík	8	8	
4	Hekla	8	3	
5	Hveragerði	8	3	

== Group B ==
Pos	Team	Played	Points	Notes
1	Reynir S.	6	8	Advanced to final round
2	Leiknir R.	6	7	
3	Grótta	6	5	
4	Njarðvík	6	4	
5	Grettir	0	0	Quit mid-season

== Group C ==
Pos	Team	Played	Points	Notes
1	Afturelding	8	12	Advanced to final round
2	Bolungarvík	8	8	
3	Víðir	8	7	
4	Stjarnan	8	7	
5	ÍR	8	2	

== Group D ==
Pos	Team	Played	Points	Notes
1	Víkingur Ó.	10	16	Advanced to final round
2	HSS	10	15	
3	Snæfell	10	12	
4	Skallagrímur	10	11	
5	Grundarfjörður	10	2	
6	USVH	10	0	

== Group E ==
Pos	Team	Played	Points	Notes
1	KS	10	18	Advanced to final round
2	UMSS	10	10	
3	Magni	10	10	
4	Árroðinn	10	8	
5	Leiftur	10	7	
6	USAH	10	7	

== Group F ==
Pos	Team	Played	Points	Notes
1	Þróttur N.	6	10	Advanced to final round
2	Huginn	6	7	
3	Einherji	6	5	
4	Valur Reyð.	6	0	

== Group G ==
Pos	Team	Played	Points	Notes
1	Leiknir F.	4	7	Advanced to final round
2	Austri	4	5	
3	KSH	4	0	

== Final round ==
=== Group A ===
Pos	Team	Pld	W	D	L	GF	GA	GD	Pts	Qualification
1	Afturelding	3	2	0	1	6	3	+3	4	Advanced to final
2	Þróttur N.	3	2	0	1	7	6	+1	4	Advanced to 3rd place playoff
3	KS	3	1	1	1	4	3	+1	3	
4	Víkingur Ó.	3	0	1	2	4	9	−5	1	

=== Group B ===
Pos	Team	Pld	W	D	L	GF	GA	GD	Pts	Qualification
1	Reynir S.	2	2	0	0	5	3	+2	4	Advanced to final
2	Fylkir	2	0	1	1	2	3	−1	1	Advanced to 3rd place playoff
3	Leiknir F.	2	0	1	1	1	2	−1	1	

=== Finals ===
==== 1st place ====
Team 1	Score	Team 2
Reynir S.	1–1	Afturelding
Reynir S.	3–2	Afturelding

Reynir S. was promoted straight after these games to the 1977 1. deild. Afturelding had to enter a three-team playoff with the team in 3rd place (Þróttur N.) and the bottom team of the 1976 1. deild karla, (Reynir Á.).

==== 3rd place ====
Team 1	Score	Team 2
Þróttur N.	1–0	Fylkir

==== Playoff round for two 1. deild places ====
Pos	Team	Played	Points	Notes
1	Þróttur N.	2	4	Promoted to 1977 1. deild
2	Reynir Á.	2	2	Escaped relegation from 1976 1. deild
3	Afturelding	2	0	

Reynir S. and Þróttur N. won promotion to the 1977 1. deild karla. Reynir Á. avoided relegation from the 1. deild.
