= Björn Helgason =

Icelandic footballer

Personal information
- Date of birth: 24 September 1935 (age 91)
- Place of birth: Ísafjörður, Kingdom of Iceland
- Positions: Midfielder; forward

Youth career
- Vestri

Senior career*
Years	Team	Apps	(Gls)
1955–1962	ÍBÍ		
1963	Fram		(1)
1963–1977	ÍBÍ		

International career
1959–1963	Iceland	2	(0)

Managerial career
- 1986: Boltafélag Ísafjarðar (men's)
- 1992: Boltafélag Ísafjarðar (women's)
- * Club domestic league appearances and goals

Björn Helgason (born 24 September 1935) is an Icelandic former footballer who played as a midfielder or forward. He is a former member of the Icelandic men's national football team.

== International career ==
After key performances for ÍBÍ, Björn was selected for a friendly game against the national team in 1958. He impressed the spectators with his performance, including former Arsenal and A.C. Milan player Albert Guðmundsson who recommended him for the national team.

During the summer of 1959, Björn was selected to the national team squad ahead of its home games against Norway and Denmark in the 1960 Summer Olympics qualification but did not play. On 29 July 1959, Björn played for Iceland against Faroe Islands, scoring twice in Iceland's 5–2 victory. As Iceland was missing several of its key players, the Football Association of Iceland only counted the game as a tier-2 national game although the Faroe Islands Football Association counted him as a tier-1 national game. In August, Björn was again selected to the team for the away games against Norway and Denmark in the Olympics qualification. He was an unused substitute in Iceland's 1–1 draw against Denmark but started in Iceland's 1–2 loss against Norway.

After helping ÍBÍ win the 2. deild karla in 1961 and achieve promotion to the top-tier 1. deild karla, Björn was again selected to the national team ahead of its friendly game against England national amateur football team on 16 September that same year. He missed Iceland's 0–1 loss after suffering a concussion on practice before the game.

On 7 September 1963, Björn played in Iceland's 0–6 loss against England in the 1964 Summer Olympics qualification.

== Titles ==
- 2. deild karla:^{1} 1961
- 3. deild karla:^{2} 1973

^{1} Named 2. deild karla until 1997 when the name was changed to 1. deild karla.
^{2} Named 3. deild karla until 1997 when the name was changed to 2. deild karla.

== Personal life ==
Björn is the father of Icelandic singer and actor Helgi Björnsson.

== See also ==
- List of Iceland international footballers
