= Fossavatnsgangan =

Cross-country skiing race in Iceland

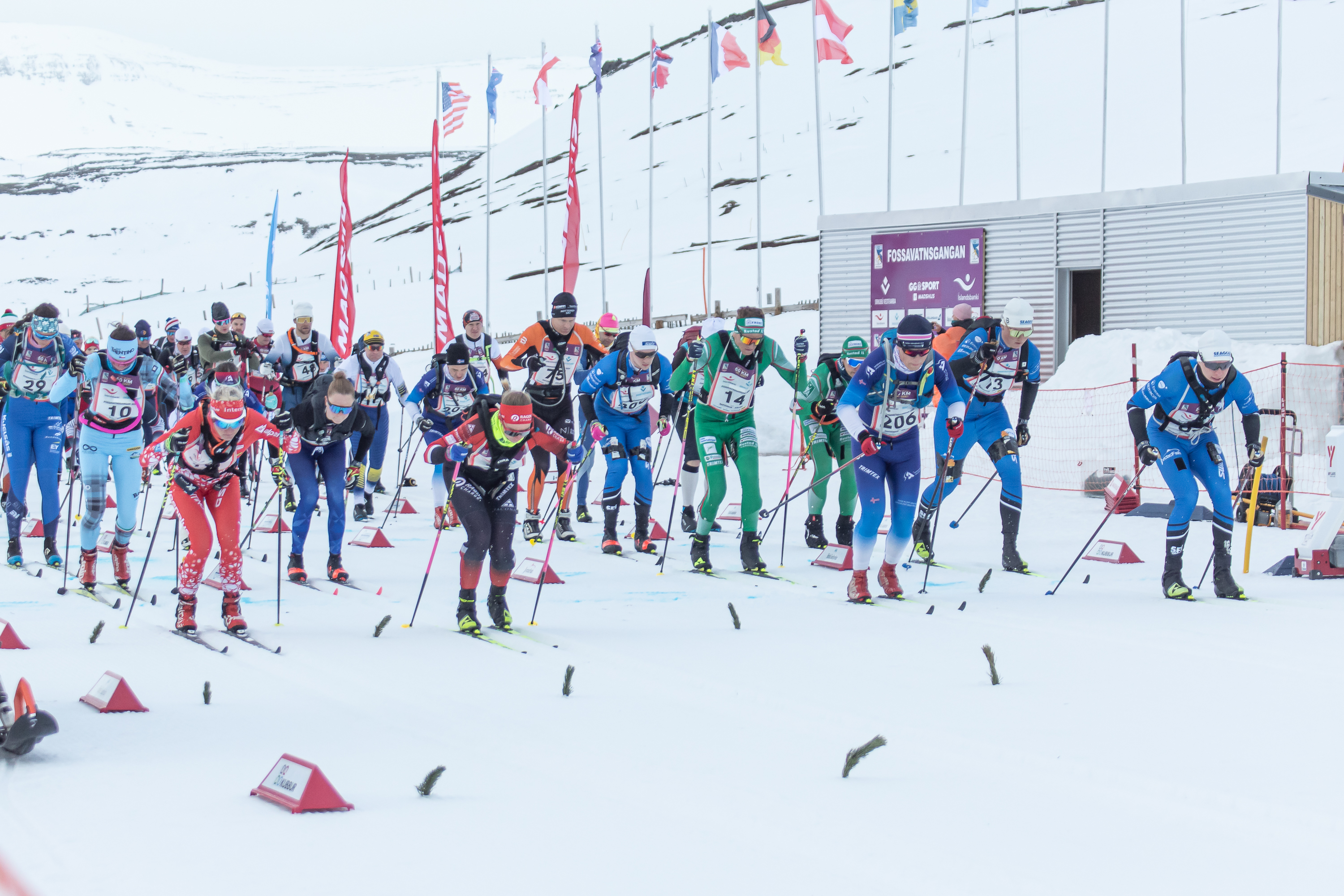
- Start of 2024 race
- Status: Active
- Genre: Sporting event
- Date: April
- Frequency: annual
- Venue: Seljalandsdalur
- Location: Ísafjörður
- Country: Iceland
- Inaugurated: 1935
- Participants: 600 (2024)
- Major events: Cross country skiing
- Website: https://www.fossavatn.is/

Fossavatnsgangan is an annual ski marathon held in Ísafjörður, in the Westfjords of Iceland. The event has been a part of Worldloppet since 2014.

It is the oldest ski race in Iceland, held since 1935. Although it was cancelled several times in the 1940s and 1950s, the race has been held every year since 1956.

Initially a 20 km race, a shorter distance of 10 km was added in 1987, and in 1989 a 7 kilometre course followed to attract children and beginners. The currently longest race over the distance of 50 km has only been held since 2004 and due to its challenges and difficulties has increasingly attracted international professional skiers, particularly Norwegians. In 2005 this 50 km marathon was added to the FIS, and that same year Fossavatn became a founding partner of the FIS Nordic Ski Marathon Cup, a series which includes the Holmenkollen Skimaraton in Norway, Tornedalsloppet in Sweden, Oulun Tervahiihto in Finland and the Fossavatn Ski Marathon in Iceland.

The most successful athlete of the marathon since its inception in 1935 is a local skier named Kristján Rafn Guðmundsson, 12 times winner of the Fossavatn Ski Marathon in the 1960s and 1970s. The most prolific competitor is another local named Sigurður Jónsson who first competed in 1938.

== Winners ==
=== Men ===
Year	Name	Nation
1994 – 21 km	Gísli Einar Árnason	Iceland
1995 – 21 km	Einar Ólafsson	Iceland
1996 – 21 km	Gísli Einar Árnason	Iceland
1997 – 21 km	Einar Ólafsson	Iceland
1998 – 21 km	Magnús Eiríksson	Iceland
1999 – 21 km	Magnús Eiríksson	Iceland
2000 – 21 km	Ólafur Thorlacius Árnason	Iceland
2001 – 21 km	Markús Þór Björnsson	Iceland
2002 – 21 km	Ólafur Thorlacius Árnason	Iceland
2003 – 21 km	Ólafur Thorlacius Árnason	Iceland
2004	Ólafur Thorlacius Árnason	Iceland
2005	Atle Bjerkli	Norway
2006	Jørgen Aukland	Norway
2007	Oskar Svärd	Sweden
2008	Svein Tore Sinnes	Norway
2009	Oskar Svärd	Sweden
2010	Markus Jönsson	Sweden
2011	Vadim Gusev	Lithuania
2012	Markus Jönsson	Sweden
2013	Toni Livers	Switzerland
2014	Petter Soleng Skinstad	Norway
2015	Ilia Chernousov	Russia
2016	Markus Ottosson	Sweden
2017	Petter Northug	Norway
2018	Ilia Chernousov	Russia
2019	Morten Eide Pedersen	Norway
2020	Cancelled due to the coronavirus pandemic	
2021	Snorri Einarsson	Iceland
2022	Snorri Einarsson	Iceland
2023	Mathias Aas Rolid	Norway
2024	Magnus Waaler	Norway

=== Women ===
Year	Name	Nation
1995 – 21 km	Vigdís Harðardóttir	Iceland
1996 – 21 km	Helga Margrét Malmquist	Iceland
1997 – 21 km	Stella Hjaltadóttir	Iceland
1998 – 21 km	Sigrún Sólbjört Halldórsdóttir	Iceland
1999 – 21 km	Stella Hjaltadóttir	Iceland
2000 – 21 km	Katrín Árnadóttir	Iceland
2001 – 21 km	Stella Hjaltadóttir	Iceland
2002 – 21 km	Sanda Dís Steinþórsdóttir	Iceland
2003 – 21 km	Jóna Lind Karlsdóttir	Iceland
2004	Linda Ramsdell	United States
2005	Linda Ramsdell	United States
2006	Mary Beth Tuttle	United States
2007	Susanne Nyström	Sweden
2008	Lina Andersson	Sweden
2009	Kim Rudd	United States
2010	Mary Beth Tuttle	United States
2011	Hólmfríður Vala Svavarsdóttir	Iceland
2012	Aino-Kaisa Saarinen	Finland
2013	Seraina Boner	Switzerland
2014	Mary J Young	Canada
2015	Riitta-Liisa Roponen	Finland
2016	Justyna Kowalczyk	Poland
2017	Britta Johansson Norgren	Sweden
2018	Maria Gräfnings	Sweden
2019	Marine Dusser	France
2020	Cancelled due to the coronavirus pandemic	
2021	Iris Pessey	France
2022	Andrea Kolbeinsdóttir	Iceland
2023	Nadja Kaelin	Switzerland
2024	Anikken Gjerde Alnæs	Norway
