= Hadja Saran Daraba Kaba =

Guinean politician

- Born: 1945 (age 80–81); Coyah, Guinea
- Education: University of Halle-Wittenberg; Herder Institute; University of Conakry
- Occupation: Women activist
- Known for: fight for feminism

Hadja Saran Daraba Kaba (born 1945) is a Guinean women activist, the first female Secretary-General of the Mano River Union and 2010 presidential candidate in Guinea general election.

== Life ==
Hadja Saran Daraba Kaba was born in 1945 towards the end of the Second World War in Coyah, Guinea into a less well-off family, her father was a soldier and activist under the regime of the late President Ahmed Sékou Touré. She forged her political weapons at an early age. She trained as a pharmacist in Leipzig and Halle in Germany between 1966 and 1979. In 1970, she returned to Guinea where she lectured at Hadja Mafory Bangoura Faculty of Medicine and Pharmacy and later joined Pharmaguinée where she rose to become the Deputy National Director of Exports at the Ministry of Foreign Trade. In 1996 she became Minister of Social Affairs and Promotion of Women and Children.

== Presidential election ==
In 2010, during the presidential elections in Guinea, she was the only woman in the running out of 24 candidates before joining Alpha Condé in the second round.

== Mano River Union ==
Between September 2011 and 2017, she was the general secretary of the Mano river union and founder of the women's network of the Mano River Union for Peace (REFMAP), one of the most important structures of West African civil society which greatly contributed to the resolution of several conflicts in the sub-region and the emancipation of African women and received the UN Human Rights Prize in 2003.
