= WAFU Zone A Women's Cup =

- Organiser(s): WAFU
- Founded: 2020; 6 years ago
- Region: West Africa
- Teams: 9 (Maximum)
- Current champions: Sierra Leone (1st title)
- Most championships: Senegal (2 titles)
- 2025 WAFU Zone A Women's Cup

The WAFU Zone A Women's Cup is a women's association football competition contested by national teams of the West African Football Union (WAFU). The WAFU region is divided into two zone and each has its own tournament.

The first edition was planned for December 2019 but then postponed two months. It was then played in 2020 with eight teams. The only national team from Zone A not entering was Mauritania.

The relevant WAFU Zone B Women's Cup was first played out two years earlier in 2018.

== Results ==
Editions	Years	Hosts	Finals			Third place playoff			Number of teams
Editions	Years	Hosts	Winners	Scores	Runners-up	Third place	Score	Fourth place	Number of teams
1	2020	Sierra Leone	Senegal	3–0	Mali	Liberia	1–0	Cape Verde	8
2	2023	Cape Verde	Senegal	1–0	Cape Verde	Gambia	3–2	Guinea-Bissau	7
3	2025	Mauritania	Sierra Leone	1–0	Senegal	Liberia	1–0	Mali	8

== Comprehensive team results by tournament ==
Legend

- 1st – Champions
- 2nd – Runners-up
- 3rd – Third place
- 4th – Fourth place
- Q – Qualified for upcoming tournament
- • – Did not qualify
- × – Did not enter / Withdrew / Banned
- – Hosts

For each tournament, the number of teams (in brackets) are shown.

Team	2020 (Sierra Leone) (8)	2023 (Cape Verde) (7)	2025 (Mauritania) (8)	Total
Cape Verde	4th	2nd	×	2
Gambia	GS	3rd	GS	3
Guinea	GS	GS	GS	3
Guinea-Bissau	GS	4th	GS	3
Liberia	3rd	×	3rd	2
Mali	2nd	×	4th	2
Mauritania	×	GS	GS	2
Senegal	1st	1st	2nd	3
Sierra Leone	GS	GS	1st	3

== Overall team records ==
Teams are ranked by total points, then by goal difference, then by goals scored.

As of 2025 WAFU Zone A Women's Cup

Rank	Team	Part	Pld	W	D	L	GF	GA	GD	Pts
1	Senegal	3	15	12	2	1	36	6	+30	38
2	Mali	2	10	6	1	3	22	7	+15	19
3	Liberia	2	10	5	2	3	14	10	+4	17
4	Gambia	3	11	5	0	6	20	29	−9	15
5	Cape Verde	2	9	4	1	4	15	9	+6	13
6	Sierra Leone	3	11	3	4	4	9	16	−7	13
7	Guinea	3	9	2	1	6	8	18	−10	7
8	Mauritania	2	5	1	1	3	3	13	−10	4
9	Guinea-Bissau	3	10	1	0	9	7	31	−24	3

== Awards ==
=== Winning coaches ===
Year	Team	Coach
2020	Senegal	(Senegal) Mame Moussa Cissé
2023	Senegal	(Senegal) Mame Moussa Cissé
2025	Sierra Leone	(Sierra Leone) Hassan Mansaray

=== Top goalscorers ===
Year	Goalscorers	Goals
2020	(Mali) Agueissa Diarra	6
2023	(Senegal) Hapsatou Malado Diallo	9
2025	(Senegal) Hapsatou Malado Diallo	5

=== Fair play award ===
Year	Team
2020	
2023	Guinea-Bissau
