= Dagur Benediktsson =

Icelandic cross-country skier (born 1998)

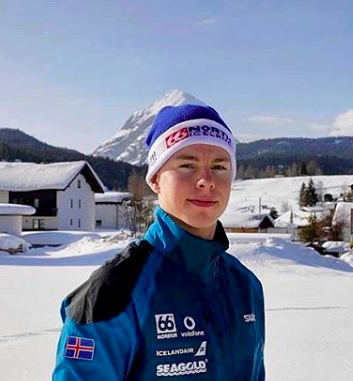
- Dagur at the FIS Nordic World Ski Championships 2019.

Personal information
- Born: 17 June 1998 (age 28) Ísafjörður, Iceland
- Height: 180 cm (5 ft 11 in)
- Parent: Stella Hjaltadóttir (mother)

Sport
- Sport: Skiing
- Updated on 22 February 2019

Dagur Benediktsson (born 17 June 1998) is an Icelandic cross-country skier. He competed in the 2026 Winter Olympics in the sprint, 10 kilometre freestyle, 20 kilometre skiathlon and the 50 kilometre classical events, as well as the 2016 Winter Youth Olympics.

== Personal life ==
Dagur was born in Ísafjörður on the Icelandic National Day, 17 June. At a young age Dagur moved to Denmark with his parents but moved back to Ísafjörður at the age of 5. His mother is the former Icelandic cross-country skier and footballer Stella Hjaltadóttir. Just like his mother, Dagur played football along with skiing, playing for Vestri until the age of 18. In May 2017 Dagur graduated from Menntaskólinn á Ísafirði and moved to Östersund, Sweden to concentrate fully on skiing. In 2022, he was named Ísafjarðarbær's athlete of the year and again in 2024.

== Personal life ==
Dagur's partner is the Icelandic alpine ski racer Hólmfríður Dóra Friðgeirsdóttir.
