= 1978 Úrvalsdeild =

Úrvalsdeild
- Season: 1978

Statistics of Úrvalsdeild in the 1978 season.

== Overview ==
It was contested by 10 teams, and Valur won the championship. ÍA's Pétur Pétursson was the top scorer with 19 goals.

== Final league table ==
Pos	Team	Pld	W	D	L	GF	GA	GD	Pts	Qualification or relegation
1	Valur (C)	18	17	1	0	45	8	+37	35	Qualification for the European Cup first round
2	ÍA	18	13	3	2	47	13	+34	29	Qualification for the Cup Winners' Cup first round
3	Keflavík	18	8	4	6	31	25	+6	20	Qualification for the UEFA Cup first round
4	ÍBV	18	8	3	7	29	24	+5	19	
5	Víkingur	18	9	1	8	27	31	−4	19	
6	Fram	18	7	2	9	23	31	−8	16	
7	Þróttur	18	4	6	8	22	27	−5	14	
8	KA	18	3	5	10	14	38	−24	11	
9	FH (R)	18	2	6	10	22	37	−15	10	Relegation to 1. deild karla
10	Breiðablik (R)	18	3	1	14	19	45	−26	7	Relegation to 1. deild karla

Source: RSSSF
Rules for classification: 1) points; 2) goal difference; 3) number of goals scored.
(C) Champions; (R) Relegated

== Results ==
Each team played every opponent once home and away for a total of 18 matches.

Home \ Away	BRE	FH	FRA	ÍA	ÍBV	KA	ÍBK	VAL	VÍK	ÞRÓ
Breiðablik		0–4	0–2	0–3	2–0	2–2	0–2	1–4	1–2	1–4
FH	1–3		2–3	1–7	0–2	0–0	2–0	0–2	3–3	0–0
Fram	2–0	4–4		0–2	2–1	1–0	1–3	0–3	0–1	4–1
ÍA	4–0	2–0	1–0		0–0	1–0	3–0	0–1	5–0	3–2
ÍBV	1–0	3–0	3–2	2–3		6–2	1–2	0–3	0–2	3–0
KA	0–3	1–0	3–0	0–5	1–1		0–5	0–0	2–5	0–0
Keflavík	3–1	2–2	1–1	2–2	2–3	2–3		0–2	3–1	0–0
Valur	4–2	2–1	3–0	1–0	1–0	5–0	2–1		3–0	1–0
Víkingur	3–1	1–0	3–0	2–4	0–1	1–0	0–1	2–5		1–0
Þróttur	4–2	2–2	0–1	2–2	2–2	1–0	1–2	1–3	2–0	

Source: RSSSF
Legend: Blue = home team win; Yellow = draw; Red = away team win.
