= 1981 1. deild karla =

Icelandic football league season

The 1981 season of 1. deild karla was the 27th season of second-tier football in Iceland.

== League table ==
| Pos | Team | Pld | W | D | L | GF | GA | GD | Pts | Promotion or relegation |
|---|---|---|---|---|---|---|---|---|---|---|
| 1 | Keflavík (C, P) | 18 | 13 | 2 | 3 | 38 | 12 | +26 | 28 | Promoted to 1982 Úrvalsdeild |
| 2 | ÍBÍ (P) | 18 | 12 | 3 | 3 | 34 | 18 | +16 | 27 | Promoted to 1982 Úrvalsdeild |
| 3 | Þróttur R. | 18 | 7 | 7 | 4 | 22 | 13 | +9 | 21 | |
| 4 | Reynir S. | 18 | 8 | 5 | 5 | 20 | 16 | +4 | 21 | |
| 5 | Fylkir | 18 | 8 | 3 | 7 | 23 | 18 | +5 | 19 | |
| 6 | Völsungur | 18 | 6 | 5 | 7 | 21 | 20 | +1 | 17 | |
| 7 | Skallagrímur | 18 | 5 | 5 | 8 | 20 | 21 | −1 | 15 | |
| 8 | Þróttur N. | 18 | 4 | 6 | 8 | 16 | 23 | −7 | 13 (Note: 1 point deducted?) | |
| 9 | Selfoss (R) | 18 | 3 | 3 | 12 | 10 | 36 | −26 | 9 | Relegated to 1982 2. deild |
| 10 | Haukar (R) | 18 | 2 | 5 | 11 | 19 | 46 | −27 | 9 | Relegated to 1982 2. deild |

Rules for classification: 1) points; 2) goal difference; 3) number of goals scored.
(C) Champions; (P) Promoted; (R) Relegated

== Top scorers ==
| Scorer | Goals | Team |
|---|---|---|
| (Iceland) Ólí Þór Magnússon | 10 | Keflavík |
| (Iceland) Olgeir Sigurðsson | 9 | Völsungur |
| (Iceland) Ómar Björnsson | 9 | Reynir S. |
| (Iceland) Steinar Jóhannsson | 9 | Keflavík |
| (Iceland) Ómar Egilsson | 8 | Fylkir |
| (Iceland) Ragnar Margeirsson | 8 | Keflavík |
