= 2025 WAFU Zone A Women's Cup =

Women's Cup WAFU-A 2025
Tournoi Féminin UFOA A Mauritanie 2025

Tournament details
- Host country: Mauritania
- City: Nouakchott
- Dates: 22 – 31 May
- Teams: 8 (from 1 sub-confederation)
- Venue: 2 (in 1 host city)

Final positions
- Champions: Sierra Leone (1st title)
- Runners-up: Senegal
- Third place: Liberia
- Fourth place: Mali

Tournament statistics
- Matches played: 16
- Goals scored: 49 (3.06 per match)
- Top scorer(s): (Senegal) Hapsatou M. Diallo (5 goals)
- Best player: (Sierra Leone) Hannah Juana
- Best goalkeeper: (Sierra Leone) Hannah Juana

The 2025 WAFU Zone A Women's Cup (French: Coupe féminine de la zone A de l'UFOA 2025; Arabic: كأس اتحاد غرب إفريقيا للسيدات منطقة أ 2025) was the third edition of the WAFU Zone A Women's Cup, an international women's football tournament contested by the women's national association football teams of West Africa zone A organized by the West African Football Union (WAFU). Mauritania hosted the tournament from 22 to 31 May 2025, marking the first-ever women's international football competition to take place in the country.

Senegal were two-time champions, having won every edition of the tournament to date. However, they fell short in their title defense after a 0–1 defeat to Sierra Leone in the final. Conversely, Sierra Queens; who had never progressed beyond the group stage in prior editions, enjoyed a historic campaign, culminating in their maiden title triumph. Senegal's Hapsatou Malado Diallo claimed the Top Scorer award for the second consecutive time, netting five goals throughout the competition. Sierra Leone's goalkeeper, Hannah Juana was named both Best Player and Best Goalkeeper, following a series of standout performances that played a pivotal role in her nation's maiden title victory.

Of the eight participating teams, hosts Mauritania scored their first-ever goal in the tournament and went on to secure their maiden victory; both in the competition and on the international stage, by defeating Guinea-Bissau in their final group-stage match.

== Teams ==
=== Participating teams ===
On 13 May 2025, WAFU Zone A announced that 8 of its 9 member associations would participate in the tournament, with Cape Verde, last edition's runners-up, being the only nation to not enter.

| Team | App. | Previous best performance | WR (Note: As of the latest FIFA Women's World Ranking, published on 6 March 2025.) |
|---|---|---|---|
| Gambia | 3rd | Third place (2023) | 123 |
| Guinea | 3rd | Group stage (2020, 2023) | 144 |
| Guinea-Bissau | 3rd | Fourth place (2023) | 177 |
| Liberia | 2nd | Third place (2020) | 167 |
| Mali | 2nd | Runners-up (2020) | 78 |
| Mauritania | 2nd | Group stage (2023) | NR |
| Senegal | 3rd | Champions (2020, 2023) | 82 |
| Sierra Leone | 3rd | Group stage (2020, 2023) | 150 |

Did not enter

Cape Verde (125)

=== Draw ===
The draw to determine the participating countries' groups took place at 11:00 GMT on 14 May 2025 at the WAFU-UFOA A headquarters in Banjul, The Gambia. The draw started with the hosts, Mauritania, being assigned to position A1, and title holders Senegal being assigned to position B1. The other teams were drawn using two pots: one containing the teams and the other the positions in the groups.

The draw resulted in the following groups:

Group A
| Pos | Team |
|---|---|
| A1 | Mauritania (host) |
| A2 | Mali |
| A3 | Guinea-Bissau |
| A4 | Liberia |

Group B
| Pos | Team |
|---|---|
| B1 | Senegal (TH) |
| B2 | Guinea |
| B3 | Sierra Leone |
| B4 | Gambia |

=== Squads ===
Each team was required by WAFU-UFOA to name a squad of a minimum of 20 players (two of whom must be goalkeepers).

== Venues ==
On 14 May 2025, WAFU A confirmed the selection of two stadiums within the Mauritanian capital to host the tournament matches.

| 2025 WAFU Zone A Women's Cup is located in Mauritania | Nouakchott | |
|---|---|---|
| 2025 WAFU Zone A Women's Cup is located in Mauritania | Cheikha Ould Boïdiya Stadium | Ksar Stadium |
| 2025 WAFU Zone A Women's Cup is located in Mauritania | Capacity: 8,200 | Capacity: 5,000 |

== Match officials ==
As of 22 May 2025, the following match officials were confirmed for the tournament.

=== Referees ===
- (The Gambia) Fatou Ngum
- (Guinea) Félicité Kourouma
- (Liberia) Love Whyee
- (Mali) Aissata Diarra
- (Mauritania) Aissata Lam
- (Mauritania) Yacine Samassa

=== Assistant referees ===
- (Cape Verde) Marisa Monteiro
- (The Gambia) Abbie Ceesay
- (Guinea-Bissau) Cadidjatu Mancal
- (Mali) Mariam Coulibaly
- (Mauritania) Diba Houleye

== Group stage ==
WAFU A initially announced the tournament schedule, including kick-off times and venues, on 14 May 2025. However, the schedule was completely rescheduled on 18 May due to visa issues that delayed the arrival of most delegations to Mauritania, with the tournament now set to start on 22 May.

=== Tiebreakers ===
In the group stage, Teams are ranked according to points (3 points for a win, 1 point for a draw, 0 points for a loss), and if tied on points, the following tiebreaking criteria are applied, in the order given, to determine the rankings:

1. Points in head-to-head matches among tied teams;
2. Goal difference in head-to-head matches among tied teams;
3. Goals scored in head-to-head matches among tied teams;
4. If more than two teams are tied, and after applying all head-to-head criteria above, a subset of teams are still tied, all head-to-head criteria above are reapplied exclusively to this subset of teams;
5. Goal difference in all group matches;
6. Goals scored in all group matches;
7. Drawing of lots.

All times are local, GMT (UTC).

=== Group A ===
| Pos | Team | Pld | W | D | L | GF | GA | GD | Pts | Qualification |
|---|---|---|---|---|---|---|---|---|---|---|
| 1 | Mali | 3 | 2 | 1 | 0 | 10 | 2 | +8 | 7 | Advance to knockout phase |
| 2 | Liberia | 3 | 1 | 2 | 0 | 5 | 3 | +2 | 5 | Advance to knockout phase |
| 3 | Mauritania (H) | 3 | 1 | 1 | 1 | 3 | 6 | −3 | 4 | |
| 4 | Guinea-Bissau | 3 | 0 | 0 | 3 | 2 | 9 | −7 | 0 | |

Source: UFOA A
Rules for classification: Group stage tiebreakers
(H) Hosts
22 May 2025
16:00

| Mauritania | 0–5 | Mali |
|---|---|---|
| | Report | Koné 5'; S. Diarra 14', 66'; Ag. Diarra 26'; Samaké 28' |

Cheikha Ould Boïdiya Stadium, Nouakchott
Referee: Fatou Ngum (Gambia)
22 May 2025
16:00

| Guinea-Bissau | 1–3 | Liberia |
|---|---|---|
| Iala 16' | Report | Quachie 45+3'; Eiden 63', 89' |

Stade Ksar, Nouakchott
Referee: Félicité Kourouma (Guinea)

24 May 2025
19:00

| Guinea-Bissau | 1–4 | Mali |
|---|---|---|
| Iala 36' | Report | Koné 24', 49', 62'; Ag. Diarra 40' |

Stade Ksar, Nouakchott
Referee: Aida Sy (Senegal)
24 May 2025
19:00

| Liberia | 1–1 | Mauritania |
|---|---|---|
| Morris 56' | Report | Diabira 87' (pen.) |

Cheikha Ould Boïdiya Stadium, Nouakchott
Referee: Humu Marah (Sierra Leone)

26 May 2025
16:00

| Mali | 1–1 | Liberia |
|---|---|---|
| Dembele 21' | Report | Yantay 45+3' |

Stade Ksar, Nouakchott
Referee: Fatou Ngum (Gambia)
26 May 2025
16:00

| Mauritania | 2–0 | Guinea-Bissau |
|---|---|---|
| Gangué 54'; Diop 64' | Report |

Cheikha Ould Boïdiya Stadium, Nouakchott
Referee: Félicité Kourouma (Guinea)

=== Group B ===
| Pos | Team | Pld | W | D | L | GF | GA | GD | Pts | Qualification |
|---|---|---|---|---|---|---|---|---|---|---|
| 1 | Senegal | 3 | 2 | 1 | 0 | 9 | 2 | +7 | 7 | Advance to knockout phase |
| 2 | Sierra Leone | 3 | 1 | 1 | 1 | 5 | 6 | −1 | 4 | Advance to knockout phase |
| 3 | Guinea | 3 | 1 | 0 | 2 | 7 | 9 | −2 | 3 | |
| 4 | Gambia | 3 | 1 | 0 | 2 | 6 | 10 | −4 | 3 | |

Source: UFOA A
Rules for classification: Group stage tiebreakers
22 May 2025
19:00

| Senegal | 2–1 | Guinea |
|---|---|---|
| W. Ndiaye 12'; H. Diallo 45+3' | Report | Sidibé 90+2' |

Cheikha Ould Boïdiya Stadium, Nouakchott
Referee: Yacine Samassa (Mauritania)
22 May 2025
19:00

| Sierra Leone | 0–3 | Gambia |
|---|---|---|
| | Report | Jammeh 56'; Sonko 59'; Jarju 73' |

Stade Ksar, Nouakchott
Referee: Love Whyee (Liberia)

24 May 2025
16:00

| Sierra Leone | 3–1 | Guinea |
|---|---|---|
| J. Brima 61'; Jumu 85'; K. Brima 89' | Report | Fan. Camara 77' (pen.) |

Stade Ksar, Nouakchott
Referee: Fatou Ngum (Gambia)
24 May 2025
16:00

| Gambia | 0–6 | Senegal |
|---|---|---|
| | Report | H. Diallo 3', 77'; Camara 31'; Casset 34', 43'; Diokh 65' |

Cheikha Ould Boïdiya Stadium, Nouakchott
Referee: Félicité Kourouma (Guinea)

26 May 2025
19:00

| Guinea | 4–3 | Gambia |
|---|---|---|
| Fan. Camara 12', 81'; Sidibé 38'; A. Camara 45+5' | Report | Darboe 55'; Jammeh 76'; Sonko 90+6' |

Stade Ksar, Nouakchott
Referee: Aida Sy (Senegal)
26 May 2025
19:00

| Senegal | 1–1 | Sierra Leone |
|---|---|---|
| H. Diallo 87' | Report | Jumu 3' |

Cheikha Ould Boïdiya Stadium, Nouakchott
Referee: Aissata Lam (Mauritania)

== Knockout stage ==
In the knockout stage, a penalty shoot-out is used to decide the winner if necessary.

Semi-finals
29 May – Nouakchott
Mali | 0
Sierra Leone | 1
29 May – Nouakchott
Senegal | 1
Liberia (red card) | 0

Final
31 May – Nouakchott
Sierra Leone | 1
Senegal | 0
Third Place
31 May – Nouakchott
Mali | 0
Liberia | 1

=== Semi-finals ===
29 May 2025
16:00

| Mali | 0–1 | Sierra Leone |
|---|---|---|
| | Report | S. Kamara 82' |

Cheikha Ould Boïdiya Stadium, Nouakchott
Referee: Félicité Kourouma (Guinea)

29 May 2025
19:00

| Senegal | 1–0 | Liberia |
|---|---|---|
| H. Diallo 70' (pen.) | Report |

Cheikha Ould Boïdiya Stadium, Nouakchott
Referee: Fatou Ngum (Gambia)

=== Third place play-off ===
31 May 2025
17:00

| Mali | 0–1 | Liberia |
|---|---|---|
| | Report | Glao 63' |

Cheikha Ould Boïdiya Stadium, Nouakchott
Referee: Félicité Kourouma (Guinea)

=== Final ===
Senegal and Sierra Leone contested the final for the first time in the history of the competition. The Lionesses of Teranga as two-time champions, entered the match as the tournament's most successful team, while Sierra Queens reached the final for the first time. The two sides had previously met three times in the competition, most recently in the group stage of the current edition, which ended in a 1–1 draw. Senegal had won one and drawn one of the two earlier encounters.

31 May 2025
20:00

| Sierra Leone | 1–0 | Senegal |
|---|---|---|
| S. Kamara 72' (pen.) | Report; Report (FSF) |

Cheikha Ould Boïdiya Stadium, Nouakchott
Referee: Aissata Lam (Mauritania)

| Sierra Leone | Senegal |

| GK | 21 | Hannah Juana |
| MF | 7 | Salamatu Kamara (C) |
| DF | 3 | Juliet Brima | (yellow card) 44' |
| DF | 4 | Kumba Abu |
| DF | 5 | Mabel Gbongay |
| MF | 6 | Jeneba Koroma |
| MF | 12 | Abibatu Bangura |
| MF | 14 | Fatmata Turay |
| FW | 18 | Wuyah Mohai |
| FW | 9 | Kumba Z. Brima |
| FW | 17 | Marian Jumu | (yellow card) 76' | (substituted off) 90' |
Substitutions:
| FW | 19 | Adama Mansaray | | (substituted in) 90' |
| GK | 1 | Cecilia Bangura |
| GK | 16 | Kumba Conteh |
| MF | 10 | Sarah Bangura |
| DF | 11 | Rashidatu A. Kamara |
| DF | 13 | Fatmata F. Kanu |
| DF | 15 | Juliana F. Mansaray |
| FW | 20 | Marie B. Conteh |
Manager:
Hassan Mansaray

| GK | 21 | Adji Ndiaye |
| DF | 18 | Meta Camara (C) |
| DF | 5 | Wolimata Ndiaye | (yellow card) 33' |
| DF | 8 | Marie Diokh |
| DF | 3 | Anta Dembélé | (yellow card) 22' |
| MF | 19 | Binta Korkel Seck |
| MF | 14 | Sadigatou Diallo | | (substituted off) 89' |
| MF | 15 | Fatoumata Dramé |
| FW | 7 | Pascaline Bassene | | (substituted off) 77' |
| FW | 17 | Hapsatou Malado Diallo | (yellow card) 76' |
| FW | 9 | Ndèye Awa Casset | | (substituted off) 89' |
Substitutions:
| DF | 6 | Maty Cissokho | | (substituted in) 77' |
| MF | 10 | Sokhna Nogaye Pène | | (substituted in) 89' |
| MF | 20 | Marie Ndiaye | | (substituted in) 89' |
| GK | 1 | Khady Faye |
| GK | 16 | Tenning Séne |
| MF | 12 | Safietou Sagna |
| MF | 13 | Mariama Faty |
Manager:
Mame Moussa Cissé

Player of the Match:
Salamatu Kamara (Sierra Leone)

Assistant referees:

Cadidjatu Mancal (Guinea-Bissau)
Fourth official:
Love Whyee (Liberia)

== Goalscorers ==
There were 49 goals scored in 16 matches, for an average of 3.06 goals per match.

5 goals

- (Senegal) Hapsatou Malado Diallo

4 goals

- (Mali) Oumou Kone

3 goals

- (Guinea) Fanta Danda Camara

2 goals

- (The Gambia) Fatoumatta Jammeh
- (The Gambia) Fatou Sonko
- (Guinea) Kany Sidibé
- (Guinea-Bissau) Julieta Iala
- (Liberia) Mimi Eiden
- (Mali) Agueissa Diarra
- (Mali) Salimata Diarra
- (Senegal) Ndèye Awa Casset
- (Sierra Leone) Marian Jumu
- (Sierra Leone) Salamatu Kamara

1 goal

- (The Gambia) Mbassey Darboe
- (The Gambia) Kaddy Jarju
- (Guinea) Aminata Camara
- (Liberia) Dalphine Glao
- (Liberia) Miatta Morris
- (Liberia) Jessica Quachie
- (Liberia) Bendu Yantay
- (Mali) Fatou Dembele
- (Mali) Aicha Samake
- (Mauritania) Tacko Diabira
- (Mauritania) Fatou Diop
- (Mauritania) Ramata Gangué
- (Senegal) Meta Camara
- (Senegal) Marie Diokh
- (Senegal) Wolimata Ndiaye
- (Sierra Leone) Juliet Brima
- (Sierra Leone) Kumba Zainab Brima

== Final ranking and awards ==
=== Final ranking ===
| Pos. | Team | G | Pld | W | D | L | Pts | GF | GA | GD |
|---|---|---|---|---|---|---|---|---|---|---|
| 1 | Sierra Leone | B | 5 | 3 | 1 | 1 | 10 | 6 | 5 | +1 |
| 2 | Senegal | B | 5 | 3 | 1 | 1 | 10 | 10 | 3 | +7 |
| 3 | Liberia | A | 5 | 2 | 2 | 1 | 8 | 6 | 4 | +2 |
| 4 | Mali | A | 5 | 2 | 1 | 2 | 7 | 10 | 4 | +6 |
Eliminated in the group stage
| 5 | Mauritania | A | 3 | 1 | 1 | 1 | 4 | 3 | 6 | −3 |
| 6 | Guinea | B | 3 | 1 | 0 | 2 | 3 | 6 | 8 | −2 |
| 7 | Gambia | B | 3 | 1 | 0 | 2 | 3 | 6 | 10 | −4 |
| 8 | Guinea-Bissau | A | 3 | 0 | 0 | 3 | 0 | 2 | 9 | −7 |

=== Individual awards ===
The following awards were given at the conclusion of the tournament:

| Award | Winner(s) |
|---|---|
| Golden Boot | (Senegal) Hapsatou Malado Diallo |
| Golden Ball | (Sierra Leone) Hannah Juana |
| Golden Glove | (Sierra Leone) Hannah Juana |

== See also ==
- 2025 WAFU Zone B Women's Cup
- 2024 Women's Africa Cup of Nations
