= 1978 2. deild karla =

Icelandic football league season

The 1978 season of 2. deild karla was the 13th season of third-tier football in Iceland.

== Group A ==
Pos	Team	Played	Points	Notes
1	Selfoss	10	18	Advanced to final round
2	Víðir	10	16	
3	Grindavík	10	12	
4	Hekla	10	7	
5	Þór Þ.	10	5	
6	USVS	10	4	

== Group B ==
Pos	Team	Played	Points	Notes
1	Njarðvík	10	18	Advanced to final round
2	Léttir	10	11	
3	Bolungarvík	10	9	
4	ÍK	10	9	
5	Stefnir	10	7	
6	Stjarnan	10	6	

== Group C ==
Pos	Team	Played	Points	Notes
1	Víkingur Ó.	10	18	Advanced to final round
2	Afturelding	10	15	
3	Leiknir R.	10	11	
4	Snæfell	10	8	
5	Skallagrímur	10	4	
6	Óðinn	10	4	

== Group D ==
Pos	Team	Played	Points	Notes
1	KS	8	16	Advanced to final round
2	Tindastóll	8	9	
3	Leiftur	8	7	
4	Dalvík	8	6	
5	Höfðstrendingur	8	2	

== Group E ==
Pos	Team	Played	Points	Notes
1	Magni	8	12	Advanced to final round
2	Árroðinn	8	11	
3	HSÞ-b	8	10	
4	Dagsbrún	8	6	
5	Reynir Á.	8	1	

== Group F ==
Pos	Team	Played	Points	Notes
1	Einherji	10	17	Advanced to final round
2	Sindri	10	15	
3	Leiknir F.	10	11	
4	Huginn	10	9	
5	Hrafnkell Freysgoði	10	6	
6	Höttur	10	2	

== Final round ==
=== Group A ===
Pos	Team	Pld	W	D	L	GF	GA	GD	Pts	Promotion
1	Magni	2	1	1	0	4	3	+1	3	Promoted to 1979 1. deild
2	Einherji	2	0	2	0	3	3	0	2	
3	Njarðvík	2	0	1	1	4	5	−1	1	

=== Group B ===
Pos	Team	Pld	W	D	L	GF	GA	GD	Pts	Promotion
1	Selfoss	2	1	1	0	4	1	+3	3	Promoted to 1979 1. deild
2	Víkingur Ó.	2	1	0	1	2	3	−1	2	
3	KS	2	0	1	1	1	3	−2	1	

=== Final ===
Team 1	Score	Team 2
Selfoss	3–0	Magni

Both Selfoss and Magni won promotion to the 1979 1. deild karla.
