= FIS Nordic Ski Marathon Cup =

Annual series of cross-country skiing events

FIS Nordic Ski Marathon Cup is an official skiing marathon cup held since 2005 and governed by the FIS. The cup consists of four locations, held several weeks apart in each of the Nordic countries. The first event is usually the Holmenkollen Skimaraton, Norway in February, the second in Oulun Tervahiihto, Finland in early March, the third in Tornedalsloppet, Sweden in late March or early April and the Fossavatn Ski Marathon in Iceland in late April or early May.
