= Ndèye Awa Casset =

Senegalese footballer (born 2003)

Personal information
- Date of birth: 12 November 2003 (age 22)
- Place of birth: Mbour, Senegal
- Position: Forward

Team information
- Current team: Aigles de la Médina
- Number: 9

Senior career*
Years	Team	Apps	(Gls)
2019–2022	ASC Dorades Mbour		
2022–	Aigles de la Médina		

International career
2021–	Senegal U20	4	(0)
2025–	Senegal	1	(2)
- * Club domestic league appearances and goals

Ndèye Awa Casset (born 12 November 2003) is a Senegalese footballer who plays as a forward for Senegalese Women's Championship side Aigles de la Médina and the Senegal national football team.

== Early life ==
Casset grew up in a modest neighborhood of Mbour, where her passion for football emerged early. Despite facing societal resistance and even repeated physical abuse from neighbors due to prevailing gender stereotypes, she continued to pursue the sport. Her football journey formally began at a local school led by Cheikh Thiaw.

== Club career ==
Casset began her career with ASC Dorades Mbour, the club where her mother Anna Diop once played. After three years, she joined Aigles de la Médina in July 2022, recording 10 goals in 11 matches to finish as the league’s top scorer.

== International career ==
Casset started her international career with the Senegal national under-20 team, featuring in the 2022 African U-20 Women's World Cup qualification and the 2023 African Games. She received her first senior national team call-up in May 2025 for the 2025 WAFU Zone A Women's Cup held in Mauritania. She opened her international scoring account with a brace in a 6–0 rout of Gambia at the tournament.

=== International goals ===
Scores and results list Senegal's goal tally first, score column indicates score after each Casset goal.

No.	Date	Venue	Opponent	Score	Result	Competition
1	24 May 2025	Cheikha Ould Boïdiya Stadium, Nouakchott, Mauritania	Gambia	3–0	6–0	2025 WAFU Zone A Women's Cup
2	24 May 2025	Cheikha Ould Boïdiya Stadium, Nouakchott, Mauritania	Gambia	4–0	6–0	2025 WAFU Zone A Women's Cup
3	1 July 2025	Mustapha Tchaker Stadium, Blida, Algeria	Algeria	3–0	3–0	Friendly
4	8 October 2026	Hammadi Agrebi Stadium, Radès, Tunisia	Tunisia	1–0	1–0	2028 CAF Women's Olympic qualifying tournament
