= Football at the 2011 All-Africa Games – Women's qualification =

Football at the All-Africa Games – Women's qualification
Tournament details
- Dates: -
- Teams: (from 1 confederation)

Tournament statistics
- Matches played: 10
- Goals scored: 30 (3 per match)

Qualifying matches for the Football at the 2011 All-Africa Games – Women's tournament.

== Qualification ==
Draw made in December 2010.

=== Zone 1 [North Africa] ===
Algeria qualified for the final tournament as the only entry from Zone 1.

=== Zone 2 [West Africa 1] ===
The first leg was scheduled to take place on 11–13 February 2011. The second leg was scheduled to take place on 25–27 February 2011.

Team 1	Agg.	Team 2	1st leg	2nd leg
Mali	w/o	Guinea	—	—

Guinea qualified for the final tournament after Mali withdrew.

=== Zone 3 [West Africa 2] ===
==== Preliminary round ====
The first leg took place on 11–13 February 2011. The second leg took place on 25–27 February 2011.

Team 1	Agg.	Team 2	1st leg	2nd leg
Liberia	0–11	Ghana	0–4	0–7

==== First round ====
The first leg took place on 29–30 April and 1 May 2011. The second leg took place on 15–17 May 2011.

Team 1	Agg.	Team 2	1st leg	2nd leg
Nigeria	2–3	Ghana	1–1	1–2

Ghana qualified for the final tournament.

=== Zone 4 [Central Africa] ===
==== Preliminary round ====
The first leg was scheduled to take place on 11–13 February 2011. The second leg was scheduled to take place on 25–27 February 2011.

Team 1	Agg.	Team 2	1st leg	2nd leg
Congo DR (Democratic Republic of the Congo)	w/o	Gabon	—	—

==== First round ====
The first leg was scheduled to take place on 29–30 April and 1 May 2011. The second leg was scheduled to take place on 15–17 May 2011.

Team 1	Agg.	Team 2	1st leg	2nd leg
Gabon	w/o	Cameroon	—	—

Cameroon qualified for the final tournament after Gabon withdrew.

=== Zone 5 [East Africa] ===
==== Preliminary round ====
The first leg was scheduled to take place on 11–13 February 2011. The second leg was scheduled to take place on 25–27 February 2011.

Team 1	Agg.	Team 2	1st leg	2nd leg
Kenya	w/o	Sudan	—	—

==== First round ====
The first leg was scheduled to take place on 29–30 April and 1 May 2011. The second leg was scheduled to take place on 15–17 May 2011.

Team 1	Agg.	Team 2	1st leg	2nd leg
Sudan	w/o	Tanzania	—	—

Tanzania qualified for the final tournament after Sudan withdrew.

=== Zone 6 [Southern Africa] ===
==== Preliminary round ====
The first leg took place on 13 February 2011. The second leg took place on 27 February 2011.

Team 1	Agg.	Team 2	1st leg	2nd leg
Zimbabwe	4–1	Zambia	1–0	3–1

==== First round ====
The first leg took place on 29–30 April and 1 May 2011. The second leg took place on 15–17 May 2011.

Team 1	Agg.	Team 2	1st leg	2nd leg
Angola	1–3	Zimbabwe	1–1	0–2
South Africa	4–1	Botswana	0–1	4–0

South Africa and Zimbabwe qualified for the final tournament.

=== Zone 7 [Indian Ocean] ===
No entries. One extra team will qualify from Zone 6 as a result.

== Qualified teams ==
The following countries have qualified for the final tournament:

- Mozambique (Hosts)
- Algeria (Zone 1)
- Guinea (Zone 2)
- Ghana (Zone 3)
- Tanzania (Zone 4)
- Cameroon (Zone 5)
- South Africa (Zone 6)
- Zimbabwe (Zone 6)
