= 1976 Úrvalsdeild =

Bio of KHONDOKER MIRAZ BILLAH

Úrvalsdeild
- Season: 1976

Statistics of Úrvalsdeild in the 1976 season.

== Overview ==
It was contested by 9 teams, and Valur won the championship. Valur's Ingi Björn Albertsson was the top scorer with 16 goals.

== Final league table ==
Pos	Team	Pld	W	D	L	GF	GA	GD	Pts	Qualification or relegation
1	Valur (C)	16	10	5	1	45	14	+31	25	Qualification for the European Cup first round
2	Fram	16	10	4	2	30	16	+14	24	Qualification for the UEFA Cup first round
3	ÍA	16	8	5	3	27	19	+8	21	Qualification for the Cup Winners' Cup first round
4	Víkingur	16	8	2	6	22	21	+1	18	
5	Breiðablik	16	8	2	6	21	22	−1	18	
6	Keflavík	16	6	3	7	22	23	−1	15	
7	KR	16	3	5	8	20	23	−3	11	
8	FH	16	2	4	10	11	31	−20	8	
9	Þróttur (R)	16	1	2	13	10	39	−29	4	Relegation to 1. deild karla

Source: rsssf.com
Rules for classification: 1) points; 2) goal difference; 3) number of goals scored.
(C) Champions; (R) Relegated

== Results ==
Each team played every opponent once home and away for a total of 16 matches.

Home \ Away	BRE	FH	FRA	ÍA	ÍBK	KR	VAL	VÍK	ÞRÓ
Breiðablik		3–1	0–1	0–3	2–1	0–0	2–4	3–1	3–2
FH	0–1		1–2	0–0	0–0	0–2	0–5	1–2	1–2
Fram	3–0	2–1		1–2	2–1	1–1	1–1	3–2	1–0
ÍA	2–0	1–1	1–1		4–1	1–1	1–3	0–1	1–0
Keflavík	1–2	6–1	0–1	2–2		1–0	1–0	1–1	2–1
KR	0–1	0–1	3–4	1–3	1–2		1–1	1–2	4–1
Valur	1–1	5–1	1–1	6–1	2–0	2–2		3–0	2–0
Víkingur	1–0	5–0	2–0	0–3	3–1	1–2	2–3		3–0
Þróttur	1–2	0–2	0–6	1–1	1–2	1–1	0–6	0–2	

Legend: Blue = home team win; Yellow = draw; Red = away team win.
