= 1983 Úrvalsdeild =

Úrvalsdeild
- Season: 1983

Statistics of Úrvalsdeild in the 1983 season.

== Overview ==
It was contested by 10 teams, and ÍA won the championship. Valur's Ingi Björn Albertsson was the top scorer with 14 goals.

== Final league table ==
Pos	Team	Pld	W	D	L	GF	GA	GD	Pts	Qualification or relegation
1	ÍA (C)	18	10	4	4	29	11	+18	24	Qualification for the European Cup first round
2	KR	18	5	10	3	18	19	−1	20	Qualification for the UEFA Cup first round
3	Breiðablik	18	6	7	5	23	20	+3	19	
4	Þór	18	5	8	5	21	19	+2	18	
5	Valur	18	7	4	7	29	31	−2	18	
6	Þróttur	18	6	6	6	24	31	−7	18	
7	Víkingur	18	4	9	5	20	20	0	17	
8	Keflavík	18	8	1	9	24	27	−3	17	
9	ÍBV (R)	18	5	6	7	27	25	+2	16	Cup Winners' Cup and relegation to 1. deild karla
10	ÍBÍ (R)	18	2	9	7	16	28	−12	13	Relegation to 1. deild karla

Source: KSÍ
Rules for classification: 1) points; 2) goal difference; 3) number of goals scored.
(C) Champions; (R) Relegated

== Results ==
Each team played every opponent once home and away for a total of 18 matches.

Home \ Away	BRE	ÍA	ÍBÍ	ÍBV	ÍBK	KR	VAL	VÍK	ÞÓR	ÞRÓ
Breiðablik		1–0	1–1	1–0	2–1	0–1	2–2	0–0	3–0	2–3
ÍA	3–2		3–0	1–1	4–0	1–1	2–0	2–0	0–2	5–0
ÍBÍ	1–1	1–0		2–2	1–2	1–1	1–3	2–3	0–0	2–0
ÍBV	2–2 (Note: ÍBV fielded an ineligible player and the match was verified in favor of the opponents without altering the score.)	2–1	4–0		1–2	0–0	3–0	1–1	3–1	3–0
Keflavík	0–2	0–1	3–0	3–1		1–1	1–2	1–2	2–1	3–2
KR	1–0	0–0	0–0	2–2	0–1		3–2	2–1	1–1	0–0
Valur	2–1	0–3	1–1	3–0	0–2	4–1		2–1	2–0	1–4
Víkingur	0–0	1–2	2–2	2–0	3–1	1–2	1–1		0–0	0–0
Þór	2–2	0–1	1–1	1–1	2–0	2–0	2–2	0–0		4–0
Þróttur	1–1	0–0	1–0	3–1	2–1	2–2	3–2	2–2	1–2	

Legend: Blue = home team win; Yellow = draw; Red = away team win.
