= 1980 Úrvalsdeild =

Úrvalsdeild
- Season: 1980

In the 1980 season of Úrvalsdeild, 10 teams participated in the tournament in its 69th iteration. In the tournament Valur club won its 17th title. Valur's Matthías Hallgrímsson was the top scorer with 15 goals.

== Final league table ==
Pos	Team	Pld	W	D	L	GF	GA	GD	Pts	Qualification or relegation
1	Valur (C)	18	13	2	3	43	16	+27	28	Qualification for the European Cup first round
2	Fram	18	11	3	4	23	19	+4	25	Qualification for the Cup Winners' Cup first round
3	ÍA	18	8	4	6	29	20	+9	20	
4	Víkingur	18	7	6	5	24	23	+1	20	Qualification for the UEFA Cup first round
5	Breiðablik	18	8	1	9	25	22	+3	17	
6	ÍBV	18	5	7	6	26	28	−2	17	
7	KR	18	6	4	8	16	25	−9	16	
8	FH	18	5	5	8	24	34	−10	15	
9	Keflavík (R)	18	3	7	8	16	26	−10	13	Relegation to 1. deild karla
10	Þróttur (R)	18	2	5	11	13	26	−13	9	Relegation to 1. deild karla

Source: RSSSF
Rules for classification: 1) points; 2) goal difference; 3) number of goals scored.
(C) Champions; (R) Relegated

== Results ==
Each team played every opponent once home and away for a total of 18 matches.

Home \ Away	BRE	FH	FRA	ÍA	ÍBV	ÍBK	KR	VAL	VÍK	ÞRÓ
Breiðablik		4–0	3–1	2–0	2–0	2–3	0–1	0–0	2–3	2–1
FH	0–1		1–3	1–0	1–1	1–2	1–2	2–1	0–1	0–2
Fram	2–0	1–1		2–0	1–0	1–0	1–4	1–0	1–1	3–1
ÍA	3–1	1–3	4–0		2–2	3–0	1–1	1–2	1–0	3–0
ÍBV	1–0	4–4	0–1	1–2		4–0	1–1	0–2	3–1	1–0
Keflavík	2–1	2–2	0–0	1–1	1–1		0–1	1–2	1–1	1–1
KR	1–0	1–2	0–1	0–3	1–3	1–0		0–3	0–1	0–0
Valur	3–2	4–0	4–0	0–3	7–2	1–0	5–0		3–1	2–1
Víkingur	0–3	2–2	2–2	3–0	1–1	2–1	1–2	1–1		2–0
Þróttur	0–1	2–3	0–1	1–1	1–1	1–1	1–0	1–3	0–1	

Legend: Blue = home team win; Yellow = draw; Red = away team win.

== Top Scorers ==
Mörk		Leikmaður
15	Valur	Matthías Hallgrímsson
9	Breidablik	Sigurður Grétarsson
8	IBV	Sigurlás Þorleifsson
7	VIK	Pétur Ormslev
7	FH	Magnús Teitsson
7	IA	Sigþór Ómarsson
