= Holmenkollen Skimaraton =

Holmenkollen Skimaraton is an annual ski marathon held in Norway. Held since 1974, in 2005 the race formally became one of the locations of the FIS Nordic Ski Marathon Cup, a series which includes the Holmenkollen Skimaraton, Tornedalsloppet in Sweden, the Fossavatn Ski Marathon in Iceland and Oulun Tervahiihto in Finland. The race is now usually the first race of the cup, held in February.
