= Stella Hjaltadóttir =

Icelandic footballer and cross country skier (born 1967)

Personal information
- Date of birth: 23 June 1967 (age 59)
- Place of birth: Ísafjörður, Iceland
- Position: Defender

Senior career*
Years	Team	Apps	(Gls)
1981–1986	ÍBÍ		
1987	KA		
1988	ÍBÍ		
1989	BÍ	2	(3)
1990	KA	1	(0)
1991–1994	Valur	31	(1)

International career
1987	Iceland	1	(0)
- * Club domestic league appearances and goals

Stella Hjaltadóttir (born 23 June 1967) is an Icelandic cross-country skier and former football player.

== Cross country skiing ==
Stella won a national championship in cross-country skiing in 1988, 1999, 2008 and 2013.

== Football ==
=== Club ===
Stella played 78 games with ÍBÍ, KA and Valur in Úrvalsdeild kvenna from 1984 to 1993. She won the 2. deild kvenna with Boltafélag Ísafjarðar in 1989.

=== International ===
Stella was selected to the Icelandic national football team ahead of two games against West Germany in Delmenhorst in September 1987. She was an unused substitute in the first game on September 4 but played all 90 minutes in the second game on September 6 when West Germany won 3–2.

=== Career statistics ===
Appearances and goals by club, season and competition
Club	Season	League			National Cup		Total	
Club	Season	Division	Apps	Goals	Apps	Goals	Apps	Goals
ÍBÍ	1981	N/A	–		1	0	1	0
ÍBÍ	1982	2. deild kvenna	–		–		–	
ÍBÍ	1983	2. deild kvenna	–		–		–	
ÍBÍ	1984	1. deild kvenna	10	4	–		–	
ÍBÍ	1985	1. deild kvenna	–		–		–	
ÍBÍ	1986	2. deild kvenna	-	9	–		–	
KA	1987	1. deild kvenna	–		–		–	
ÍBÍ	1988	1. deild kvenna	-	0	–		–	
BÍ	1989	2. deild kvenna	2	3	–		2	3
KA	1990	1. deild kvenna	1	0	–		0	0
Valur	1991	1. deild kvenna	14	0	–		14	0
Valur	1992	1. deild kvenna	7	0	1	0	8	0
Valur	1993	1. deild kvenna	10	1	2	0	12	1
Valur	Total		32	1	3	0	37	1
Career total			-	-	-	-	-	-

== Personal life ==
Stella is the mother of the Icelandic cross-country skier Dagur Benediktsson.
