= Junagarh =

Junagarh or Junagadh (lit. 'Old Fort') may refer to the following places in India :

- Junagadh, a city in Gujarat
  - Junagadh State, a former princely state in Saurashtra region
  - Junagadh district, a district of Gujarat
  - Junagadh Lok Sabha constituency, a parliamentary constituency in Gujarat
  - Junagadh Assembly constituency, an assembly constituency in Gujarat
- Junagarh Fort, a fort in Bikaner, Rajasthan
- Junagarh, Kalahandi, a town in Kalahandi district, Odisha
  - Junagarh Assembly constituency, an assembly constituency, Odisha

== See also ==
- Old Fort (disambiguation)
