= 1984 1. deild karla =

Icelandic football league season

The 1984 season of 1. deild karla was the 30th season of second-tier football in Iceland.

== League table ==
Pos	Team	Pld	W	D	L	GF	GA	GD	Pts	Promotion or relegation
1	FH (C, P)	18	12	4	2	38	19	+19	40	Promoted to 1985 Úrvalsdeild
2	Víðir (P)	18	10	3	5	34	25	+9	33	Promoted to 1985 Úrvalsdeild
3	KS	18	8	6	4	25	20	+5	30	
4	ÍBÍ	18	8	5	5	37	26	+11	29	
5	ÍBV	18	8	4	6	31	27	+4	28	
6	Skallagrímur	18	8	3	7	33	27	+6	27	
7	Völsungur	18	7	4	7	25	26	−1	25	
8	Njarðvík	18	7	3	8	20	21	−1	24	
9	Tindastóll (R)	18	2	3	13	17	45	−28	9	Relegated to 1985 2. deild
10	Einherji (R)	18	1	3	14	11	35	−24	6	Relegated to 1985 2. deild

Rules for classification: 1) points; 2) goal difference; 3) number of goals scored.
(C) Champions; (P) Promoted; (R) Relegated

== Top scorers ==
Scorer	Goals	Team
(Iceland) Garðar Jónsson	13	Skallagrímur
(Iceland) Guðmundur Magnússon	11	ÍBÍ
(Iceland) Ingi Björn Albertsson	10	FH
(Iceland) Grétar Einarsson	9	Víðir
(Iceland) Pálmi Jónsson	9	FH
