= 1979 1. deild karla =

Icelandic football league season

The 1979 season of 1. deild karla was the 25th season of second-tier football in Iceland.

== League table ==
Pos	Team	Pld	W	D	L	GF	GA	GD	Pts	Promotion or relegation
1	Breiðablik (C, P)	18	13	3	2	49	12	+37	29	Promoted to 1980 Úrvalsdeild
2	FH	18	11	2	5	48	22	+26	24	Promoted to 1980 Úrvalsdeild
3	Fylkir	18	9	2	7	32	22	+10	20	
4	Þróttur N.	18	7	4	7	14	21	−7	18	
5	Selfoss	18	7	3	8	25	26	−1	17	
6	Þór A.	18	7	3	8	24	27	−3	17	
7	ÍBÍ	18	5	7	6	28	34	−6	17	
8	Austri	18	5	5	8	15	29	−14	15	
9	Reynir S. (R)	18	5	5	8	20	30	−10	15	Relegated to 1980 2. deild
10	Magni (R)	18	3	2	13	17	49	−32	8	Relegated to 1980 2. deild

Rules for classification: 1) points; 2) goal difference; 3) number of goals scored.
(C) Champions; (P) Promoted; (R) Relegated

== Top scorers ==
Scorer	Goals	Team
(Iceland) Sigurður Grétarsson	15	Breiðablik
(Iceland) Pálmi Jónsson	14	FH
(Iceland) Andrés Kristjánsson	12	ÍBÍ
(Iceland) Hilmar Sighvatsson	10	Fylkir
