= Tornedalsloppet =

Annual ski marathon in Övertorneå, Sweden

- Status: active
- Genre: sports event
- Date: late March-early April
- Frequency: annual
- Location: Övertorneå
- Country: Sweden
- Inaugurated: 1968

Tornedalsloppet is an annual ski marathon held in Övertorneå, Sweden. Held since 1968, Tornedalsloppet is among the older long-distance ski-races in Sweden and the only one which commences in the Arctic Circle and finishes south of it. Traditionally two different races are held, one 45 km for adults aged 21–65 and one 23 km, for young adults aged 17–20. Since 2006 the race had formally been one of the four locations of the FIS Nordic Ski Marathon Cup, a series which includes the Tornedalsloppet, the Holmenkollen Skimaraton in Norway, the Fossavatn Ski Marathon in Iceland and Oulun Tervahiihto in Finland. The race is now usually the third race of the cup, held in late March or early April.
