= 1962 Úrvalsdeild =

Úrvalsdeild
- Season: 1962

Statistics of Úrvalsdeild in the 1962 season.

== Overview ==
It was contested by 6 teams, and Fram won the championship. ÍA's Ingvar Elísson was the top scorer with 11 goals.

== Final league table ==
Pos	Team	Pld	W	D	L	GF	GA	GD	Pts
1	Fram (C)	10	4	5	1	18	8	+10	13
2	Valur	10	5	3	2	17	8	+9	13
3	ÍA	10	4	4	2	22	16	+6	12
4	KR	10	3	5	2	22	16	+6	11
5	ÍBA	10	4	2	4	21	18	+3	10
6	ÍBÍ (R)	10	0	1	9	2	36	−34	1

Source: rsssf.com
Rules for classification: 1) points; 2) goal difference; 3) number of goals scored.
(C) Champions; (R) Relegated

== Results ==
Each team played every opponent once home and away for a total of 10 matches.

Home \ Away	FRA	ÍA	ÍBA	ÍBÍ	KR	VAL
Fram		0–0	2–0	2–0	1–1	1–1
ÍA	0–1		5–4	0–0	2–1	1–1
ÍBA	2–2	1–3		5–1	1–1	1–0
ÍBÍ	0–6	0–6	0–5		0–2	0–4
KR	2–2	4–4	4–1	4–0		2–2
Valur	1–0	4–1	0–1	2–1	2–0	

Legend: Blue = home team win; Yellow = draw; Red = away team win.
