= Old Fort, Nouakchott =

Coordinates: 18°5′51″N 15°57′30″W

The Old Fort is a fort in northeastern Nouakchott, Mauritania. It is located to the northeast of the Presidential Palace, near the Stadium of Ksar and College d'Application.
