= Hapsatou Malado Diallo =

Senegalese footballer (born 2005)

Personal information
- Date of birth: 14 April 2005 (age 21)
- Place of birth: Tambacounda, Senegal
- Height: 1.85 m (6 ft 1 in)
- Position: Striker

Senior career*
Years	Team	Apps	(Gls)
- USPA
2023–2024	Eibar	6	(0)
2024–2025	Galatasaray	23	(9)
2025	Juárez	0	(0)

International career
	Senegal	22	(19)
- * Club domestic league appearances and goals

Hapsatou Malado Diallo (born 14 April 2005) is a Senegalese professional footballer who plays as a striker for Liga MX Femenil club FC Juárez and the Senegal national team.

== Early life ==
Diallo is a native of Tambacounda, Senegal.

== Career ==
=== Eibar ===
In 2023, Diallo signed for Spanish side Eibar, becoming the first female Senegalese player to play in Spain.

=== Galatasaray ===
On 25 August 2024, Diallo signed a one-year contract with Turkish Super League club Galatasaray.

== International goals ==
No.	Date	Venue	Opponent	Score	Result	Competition
1.	15 June 2022	Reunification Stadium, Douala, Cameroon	Cameroon	1–1	2–2	Friendly
2.	21 January 2023	Estádio Marcelo Leitão, Espargos, Cape Verde	Guinea	1–0	4–0	2023 WAFU Zone A Women's Cup
3.	21 January 2023	Estádio Marcelo Leitão, Espargos, Cape Verde	Guinea	2–0	4–0	2023 WAFU Zone A Women's Cup
4.	23 January 2023	Estádio Marcelo Leitão, Espargos, Cape Verde	Gambia	1–0	4–1	2023 WAFU Zone A Women's Cup
5.	23 January 2023	Estádio Marcelo Leitão, Espargos, Cape Verde	Gambia	2–1	4–1	2023 WAFU Zone A Women's Cup
6.	23 January 2023	Estádio Marcelo Leitão, Espargos, Cape Verde	Gambia	3–1	4–1	2023 WAFU Zone A Women's Cup
7.	23 January 2023	Estádio Marcelo Leitão, Espargos, Cape Verde	Gambia	4–1	4–1	2023 WAFU Zone A Women's Cup
8.	25 January 2023	Estádio Marcelo Leitão, Espargos, Cape Verde	Sierra Leone	3–0	4–0	2023 WAFU Zone A Women's Cup
9.	27 January 2023	Estádio Marcelo Leitão, Espargos, Cape Verde	Guinea-Bissau	2–0	4–0	2023 WAFU Zone A Women's Cup
10.	27 January 2023	Estádio Marcelo Leitão, Espargos, Cape Verde	Guinea-Bissau	3–0	4–0	2023 WAFU Zone A Women's Cup
11.	31 October 2023	Stade Municipal d'Ariana, Ariana, Tunisia	Tunisia	1–0	3–2	Friendly
12.	30 November 2023	Stade Lat-Dior, Thiès, Senegal	Egypt	3–0	4–0	2024 Women's Africa Cup of Nations qualification
13.	8 April 2024	Stade Lat-Dior, Thiès, Senegal	Ghana	1–0	1–0	Friendly
14.	22 May 2025	Cheikha Ould Boïdiya Stadium, Nouakchott, Mauritania	Guinea	2–0	2–1	2025 WAFU Zone A Women's Cup
15.	24 May 2025	Cheikha Ould Boïdiya Stadium, Nouakchott, Mauritania	Gambia	1–0	6–0	2025 WAFU Zone A Women's Cup
16.	24 May 2025	Cheikha Ould Boïdiya Stadium, Nouakchott, Mauritania	Gambia	6–0	6–0	2025 WAFU Zone A Women's Cup
17.	26 May 2025	Cheikha Ould Boïdiya Stadium, Nouakchott, Mauritania	Sierra Leone	1–1	1–1	2025 WAFU Zone A Women's Cup
18.	29 May 2025	Cheikha Ould Boïdiya Stadium, Nouakchott, Mauritania	Liberia	1–0	1–0	2025 WAFU Zone A Women's Cup
19.	1 July 2025	Mustapha Tchaker Stadium, Blida, Algeria	Algeria	2–0	3–0	Friendly

== Style of play ==
Diallo mainly operates as a striker and has been described as "the prototype of a modern-day striker. It is technically very clean, fast and punchy".

== Personal life ==
Diallo has regarded Portugal international Cristiano Ronaldo as her football idol.
