= Senegal women's national football team =

Senegal female national association football team

Senegal
- Nickname(s): Lionesses of Teranga; Lionesses
- Association: Senegalese Football Federation (FSF)
- Confederation: CAF (Africa)
- Sub-confederation: WAFU (West Africa)
- Head coach: Mame Moussa Cissé
- Captain: Safietou Sagna
- Top scorer: Nguenar Ndiaye (31)
- Home stadium: Various
- FIFA code: SEN
First colours	Second colours

FIFA ranking
- Current: 79 ▲1 (16 June 2026)
- Highest: 75 (24 June 2005)
- Lowest: 102 (August 2003; December 2003 – June 2004)

First international
- Senegal 0–3 Ghana (Dakar, Senegal; 22 September 2002)

Biggest win
- Senegal 7–0 Guinea (Dakar, Senegal; 12 March 2006)

Biggest defeat
- Morocco 7–0 Senegal (Casablanca, Morocco; 29 October 2024)

Women's Africa Cup of Nations
- Appearances: 3 (first in 2012)
- Best result: Quarter-finals (2022, 2024)

WAFU Zone A Women's Cup
- Appearances: 3 (first in 2020)
- Best result: Champions (2020, 2023)
Medal record
Women's football
WAFU Zone A Women's Cup
Gold medal – first place	Sierra Leone 2020
Gold medal – first place	Cape Verde 2023
Silver medal – second place	Mauritania 2025

The Senegal women's national football team (French: Équipe nationale féminine de football du Sénégal), represents Senegal in international women's football. Established in 2002 and governed by the Senegalese Football Federation (FSF), the team has qualified for the Women's Africa Cup of Nations on three occasions but has yet to make an appearance at the FIFA Women's World Cup. The Lionesses are the most successful in the WAFU Zone A of West Africa, having won the regional competition twice out of three editions, reaching the finals in all tournaments held in 2020, 2023, and 2025.

== History ==
=== 2002–2010: Formation and early years ===
Although football in Senegal has traditionally been viewed as a male domain, women's football began taking shape as early as 1970 with the creation of the Gazelles of Dakar, led by Elliot Khouma. The team played its first international match in 1974 against Italy's Lombarda Calcio during a municipal exchange with Milan. Despite lacking official structures, the women's game grew steadily through the 1970s, with clubs such as the Dorades of Mbour, Abeilles of Bignona, and Tigresses of Ziguinchor emerging. Initiatives like the founding of the Colombes Pie XII in 1979 also helped promote the sport among young women. It was not until 2002 that the Senegalese Football Federation formally established the first women's national team, marking a major milestone in the sport's development.

The team entered the qualification campaign for the 5th African Women's Championship in 2002. Initially drawn against Guinea-Bissau, Senegal advanced by default following their opponent's withdrawal. In the second round, they faced Ghana, marking their official competitive debut on 22 September 2002 with a 3–0 home defeat to the Black Queens in Dakar. The return leg in Accra ended in a 3–1 loss, with Absah Gueye scoring Senegal's first-ever goal in an official international match.

Senegal returned for the 2004 qualifiers but were eliminated after a heavy 12–3 aggregate defeat to Nigeria. The team showed notable progress in the 2006 campaign, recording their first official win with a 4–0 victory over the Central African Republic, who later withdrew from the second leg. In the following round, Senegal secured a dominant 12–1 aggregate triumph over Guinea, which included a historic 7–0 win, their largest to date. However, their qualification hopes were dashed in the final round, falling just short against DR Congo by a one-goal margin. Similar near misses occurred in the 2008 and 2010 editions, with the team unable to reach the final tournament.

=== 2012–2019: Continental breakthrough and aftermath ===
In the 2012 African Women's Championship qualification campaign, Senegal were initially drawn against Burundi, who withdrew in the preliminary round. They then faced Morocco in the final qualifying round, advancing 5–4 on penalties after two goalless draws. With that victory, Senegal made history by qualifying for their first major tournament. Placed in the same group as the host nation, the team made its debut in the tournament with a one-nil loss to the Leopards of Congo on 28 October 2012, then went on to lose the next two group stage matches ending the group phase without scoring a goal, finishing with the worst record among the qualified teams that year.

Despite the 2012 setback, Senegal has maintained consistent participation in every qualification campaign since their debut in 2002. Although they did not qualify between 2014 and 2018, the team remained a competitive presence, regularly challenging their opponents and showing gradual improvement. During this period, the team played several friendly matches with mixed results. In 2018, Senegal took part in the inaugural WAFU Zone B Women's Cup, opening the tournament with a commanding 6–0 win over Togo. However, consecutive defeats in their next two group matches saw them exit at the group stage. The following year, their performance declined further, as they lost all three group games in the 2019 edition—including a reversal against Togo, who had beaten them despite the heavy loss a year prior.

=== 2020–present: Rise to prominence and regional dominance ===
In 2020, WAFU Zone A launched its own women's tournament, with Senegal taking part in the inaugural edition. The team began with a 1–0 victory over Guinea on 25 February and advanced to the final unbeaten, following wins over Cape Verde and Liberia and a draw against Sierra Leone. In the final, Senegal defeated regional rivals Mali 3–0 to claim the first-ever trophy in the history of the women's national team.

In October 2021, Senegal began their qualification campaign for the 2022 Women's Africa Cup of Nations with an emphatic 8–1 aggregate win over Liberia. In the second round, they eliminated Mali on penalties after both legs ended in 1–0 home victories, securing their return to the continental tournament. On 3 July 2022, Senegal recorded their first-ever win in the final tournament by defeating Uganda 2–0, followed by a victory over Burkina Faso to reach the quarter-finals for the first time. After a penalty shootout loss to Zambia in the last eight, they overcame Tunisia—also on penalties—in the repechage playoff to reach the 2023 FIFA Women's World Cup inter-confederation play-offs, marking their closest attempt yet at qualifying for the global stage.

The year 2023 marked further progress and maturity for the Lionesses. In January, they successfully defended their WAFU Zone A title, winning the tournament with a perfect record and defeating hosts Cape Verde 1–0 in the final. On 18 February 2023, Senegal faced Haiti in the inter-confederation play-offs, suffering a 0–4 defeat in their first encounter with non-African opposition. Later in the year, they secured back-to-back WAFCON qualifications for the first time in their history, overcoming Mozambique and Egypt with aggregate wins of 3–2 and 4–0, respectively.

In May 2025, the third edition of the WAFU Zone A Women's Cup saw Senegal—two-time reigning champions and previously unbeaten in the competition—suffer their first defeat and relinquish their title. After topping their group and defeating Liberia in the semi-finals, the Lionesses were narrowly beaten 1–0 by Sierra Leone in the final, marking both their first loss in the tournament's history and the end of their reign as champions.

== Team image ==
=== Identity ===
The Senegal women's national football team is commonly known as the Lionesses of Teranga, or simply the Lionesses, reflecting the nickname of the men's team. This moniker has been in use since the team's establishment in the early 2000s. The team's primary colors are white and green. Senegal has been ranked in the FIFA Women's World Rankings since July 2003, debuting at 97th. Their highest ranking came in June 2005 when they reached 75th. As of 12 June 2025, Senegal is ranked 81st in the world.

=== Home stadium ===
The Senegal women's national football team does not have a single, officially designated home stadium exclusively for their matches. Instead, the team hosts international fixtures at various prominent stadiums across the country. Since 2019, the Stade Lat-Dior in Thiès has most commonly served as their home ground, particularly for qualification matches and international friendlies.

== Results and fixtures ==
The following is a list of match results in the last 12 months, as well as any future matches that have been scheduled.

Legend

Win Draw Lose Fixture

=== 2025 ===
24 October 2026 WAFCON qualification	Senegal	0–0	Ivory Coast	Thiès, Senegal
17:00 UTC+0		Report		Stadium: Stade Lat-Dior; Referee: Mercy Mayimbo (Zimbabwe)

28 October 2026 WAFCON qualification	Ivory Coast	0–0 (4–5 p)	Senegal	Abidjan, Ivory Coast
19:00 UTC+0		Report		Stadium: Felix Houphouet Boigny Stadium; Referee: Shahenda El Maghrabi (Egypt)
	Penalties
	Kakounan (penalty scored); Kreto (penalty scored); Gbehi (penalty missed); Elloh (penalty scored); Kouassi (penalty scored)		(penalty scored) Diop; (penalty scored) Diakhaté; (penalty scored) N. Ndiaye; (penalty scored) Diallo; (penalty scored) Babou

=== 2026 ===
13 April Friendly	Senegal	1–0	Burkina Faso	Dakar, Senegal
17:00 UTC+0	Pène 2'	Report		Stadium: Stade Léopold Sédar Senghor

16 April Friendly	Senegal	3–3	Burkina Faso	Dakar, Senegal
17:00 UTC+0	K. Fall 32' (pen.), 64' (pen.), 90+6'	Report	Congo 1'; Millogo 79' (pen.); Kouanda 84'	Stadium: Stade Léopold Sédar Senghor

5 June Friendly	Nigeria	2–1	Senegal	Ikenne, Nigeria
15:00 UTC+0	Oshoala 32' (pen.); Payne 41'	Report	Pène 86'	Stadium: Remo Stars Stadium; Referee: Juliet Appiah (Ghana)

8 June Friendly	Nigeria	3–0	Senegal	Ikenne, Nigeria
15:00 UTC+0	Omewa 49', 53'; Oshoala 66'	Report		Stadium: Remo Stars Stadium

26 July 2026 2026 WAFCON GS	Algeria	2–0	Senegal	Rabat, Morocco
18:00 UTC+0	Dafeur 42' (pen.); Bethi 88'	Report		Stadium: Rabat Olympic Stadium; Referee: Akhona Makalima (South Africa)

30 July 2026 WAFCON GS	Senegal	1–0	Kenya	Rabat, Morocco
18:00 UTC+0	Mbengue 35'	Report (FIFA)		Stadium: Rabat Olympic Stadium; Referee: Yemisi Akintoye (Nigeria)

1 August 2026 WAFCON GS	Senegal	0–0	Morocco	Rabat, Morocco
21:00 UTC+0		[https://www.fifa.com/en/match-centre/match/521/290907/290908/400022775 Report (FIFA)		Stadium: Moulay El Hassan Stadium; Referee: Shamirah Nabadda (Uganda)

8 October 2026 2028 Olympic Qualification Second round	Tunisia	0–1	Senegal

13 October 2026 2028 Olympic Qualification Second round	Senegal	2–0	Tunisia

== Coaching staff ==
=== Current staff ===
As of 26 January 2023

Position	Staff	Ref.
Head coach	Mame Moussa Cissé	
Assistant coach	Soukèye Cissé	
Goalkeeper Coach	Omar Diallo	

=== Coaching history ===
Manager	Period(s)	Achievements
Salam Lam	2002	2002 African Women's Championship – Failed to qualify
Bassouaré Diaby	2005–2015	2006 African Women's Championship – Failed to qualify; 2008 African Women's Championship – Failed to qualify; 2010 African Women's Championship – Failed to qualify; 2012 African Women's Championship – Group stage; 2014 African Women's Championship – Failed to qualify; 2015 African Games – Failed to qualify
Sidate Sarr	2018	2018 WAFU Zone B Women's Cup – Group stage; 2018 Women's Africa Cup of Nations – Failed to qualify
Mbayang Thiam	2019	2019 WAFU Zone B Women's Cup – Group stage
Mame Moussa Cissé	2016; 2019–2026	2016 Women's Africa Cup of Nations – Failed to qualify; 2020 WAFU Zone A Women's Cup – Champions; 2022 Women's Africa Cup of Nations – Quarter-finals; 2023 WAFU Zone A Women's Cup – Champions; (silver) 2025 WAFU Zone A Women's Cup – Runner-up; 2024 Women's Africa Cup of Nations – Quarter-finals; 2026 Women's Africa Cup of Nations – Group stage
Alioune Abitalib Fall	2026–present	

== Players ==
=== Current squad ===
- The following players were called up for the 2026 WAFCON matches from 26 July through 16 August 2026. .

No.	Pos.	Player	Date of birth (age)	Club
1	GK	Tenning Sène	21 January 1990 (aged 36)	(Senegalese Football Federation) Jappo Olympique
2	DF	Marème Babou	13 April 2003 (aged 23)	(French Football Federation) Lens
3	DF	Anta Dembélé	15 June 1994 (aged 32)	(Senegalese Football Federation) Aigles de la Médina
4	DF	Aïssatou Fall	1 December 2007 (aged 18)	(Senegalese Football Federation) Aigles de la Médina
5	DF	Wolimata Ndiaye	10 January 2004 (aged 22)	(Royal Moroccan Football Federation) Wydad Casablanca
6	FW	Seynabou Mbengue	15 March 1992 (aged 34)	(French Football Federation) Metz
7	FW	Mama Diop	9 October 1994 (aged 31)	(French Football Federation) Saint-Malo
8	DF	Mbayang Sow	21 January 1993 (aged 33)	(Senegalese Football Federation) Aigles de la Médina
9	FW	Nguenar Ndiaye	10 January 1995 (aged 31)	(French Football Federation) Bourges
10	MF	Ndeye Awa Diakhaté	2 January 1997 (aged 29)	(Saudi Arabian Football Federation) Al-Yarmouk
11	MF	Mariama Faty	10 January 2009 (aged 17)	(Senegalese Football Federation) Kumaré Sédhiou
12	MF	Safietou Sagna	11 April 1994 (aged 32)	(French Football Federation) Saint-Denis
13	DF	Adama Sané	8 March 2005 (aged 21)	(Royal Moroccan Football Federation) Wydad Casablanca
14	MF	Sadigatou Diallo	21 February 2003 (aged 23)	(Senegalese Football Federation) Aigles de la Médina
15	MF	Fatoumata Dramé	28 March 2001 (aged 25)	(Senegalese Football Federation) Aigles de la Médina
16	GK	Khady Faye	14 January 2004 (aged 22)	(Senegalese Football Federation) Aigles de la Médina
17	FW	Khadija Badio	28 May 2006 (aged 20)	(Football Association of Slovenia) Radomlje
18	DF	Meta Kandé	26 March 2002 (aged 24)	(Saudi Arabian Football Federation) Al-Hmmah
19	MF	Bineta Korkel Seck	11 January 1998 (aged 28)	(French Football Federation) Caen
20	MF	Korka Fall (captain)	19 February 1990 (aged 36)	(French Football Federation) Caen
21	FW	Ndèye Awa Casset	12 November 2003 (aged 22)	(Senegalese Football Federation) Aigles de la Médina
22	FW	Pascaline Fofana Bassène	21 December 2002 (aged 23)	(Royal Spanish Football Federation) SE AEM
23	GK	Adji Ndiaye	4 August 2006 (aged 19)	(French Football Federation) Bourges
24	MF	Dieynaba Ndaw	10 April 2003 (aged 23)	(Royal Spanish Football Federation) CP Cacereño
25	DF	Mbène Diop	3 April 2010 (aged 16)	(Senegalese Football Federation) Dakar Sacré-Cœur
26	MF	Sokhna Nogaye Pène	11 November 2006 (aged 19)	(Senegalese Football Federation) AS Bambey

=== Recent call-ups ===
The following footballers were part of a national selection in the past 12 months, but are not part of the current squad.

Pos.	Player	Date of birth (age)	Caps	Goals	Club	Latest call-up
DF	Aminata Ba	-	-	-	(France) CPB Bréquigny	2026 WAFCON qualification
DF	Marie Diokh	5 September 2000 (age 26)	-	-	(Senegal) Aigles de la Médina	2026 WAFCON qualification
FW	Hapsatou Malado Diallo	14 April 2005 (age 21)	-	-	(Mexico) FC Juárez	2026 WAFCON qualification

== Competitive record ==
=== FIFA Women's World Cup ===
As the African continental championship has served—and continues to serve—as the qualification pathway for the FIFA Women's World Cup, Senegal, having never reached the semi-finals, have yet to qualify for the global tournament in six attempts. Their closest effort came in 2023, when they advanced to the inter-confederation play-offs.

FIFA Women's World Cup record
Host and year	Round	Pos	Pld	W	D	L	GF	GA	Squad
(China) 1991	Did not enter								
(Sweden) 1995	Did not enter								
(United States) 1999	Did not enter								
(United States) 2003	Did not qualify								
(China) 2007	Did not qualify								
(Germany) 2011	Did not qualify								
(Canada) 2015	Did not qualify								
(France) 2019	Did not qualify								
(Australia) (New Zealand) 2023	Did not qualify								
(Brazil) 2027	Did not qualify								
(Mexico) (United States) 2031	To be determined								
Total	–	0/7	–	–	–	–	–	–	–

=== Summer Olympics ===
Senegal have not attempted to qualify for the women's football tournament at the Summer Olympic Games. Although they initially entered the qualifiers for the 2008 edition, the Lionesses later withdrew and have not participated in any Olympic qualifying campaigns from their establishment in 2002 through to 2024.

=== Women's Africa Cup of Nations ===
Senegal have qualified for four editions out of the twelve they attempted. Their first appearance came in 2012, with their best performance occurring a decade later in 2022, when they reached the quarter-finals.

Women's Africa Cup of Nations record										Qualification record					
Host nation and year	Round	Pos	Pld	W	D	L	GF	GA	Squad	Pld	W	D	L	GF	GA
1991	Confirmed entry, later withdrew									No qualifications held					
1995	Did not enter									No qualifications held					
(Nigeria) 1998	Did not enter									Did not enter					
(South Africa) 2000	Did not enter									Did not enter					
(Nigeria) 2002	Did not qualify									2	0	0	2	1	6
(South Africa) 2004	Did not qualify									2	0	0	2	3	12
(Nigeria) 2006	Did not qualify									6	5	0	1	21	4
(Equatorial Guinea) 2008	Did not qualify									2	0	1	1	1	3
(South Africa) 2010	Did not qualify									4	1	1	2	1	4
(Equatorial Guinea) 2012	Group stage	8th	3	0	0	3	0	7	Squad	2	0	2	0	0	0
(Namibia) 2014	Did not qualify									2	0	1	1	1	2
(Cameroon) 2016	Did not qualify									4	1	1	2	2	4
(Ghana) 2018	Did not qualify									2	1	0	1	2	3
(Morocco) 2022	Quarter-finals	5th	5	2	2	1	4	2	Squad	4	3	0	1	9	2
(Morocco) 2024	Quarter-finals	7th	4	1	1	2	6	4	Squad	4	2	2	0	7	2
(Morocco) 2026	Group stage	11th	3	1	1	1	1	2	Squad	4	2	2	0	6	0
Total	Best: Quarter-finals	4/14	15	4	4	7	11	15	–	38	15	10	13	54	42

=== African Games ===
Senegal have qualified for one edition of the African Games out of three attempts. Their sole appearance came in 2007, where they were eliminated in the group stage. From 2019 onward, the competition was restructured as an under-20 tournament, in which the U-20 team qualified and went on to finish fourth in the 2023 edition.

African Games record
Host nation(s) and year	Round	Pos	Pld	W	D	L	GF	GA
(Nigeria) 2003	Not invited							
(Algeria) 2007	Group stage	6th	2	0	0	2	1	6
(Mozambique) 2011	Not invited							
(Republic of the Congo) 2015	Did not qualify							
(Morocco) 2019	See Senegal women's national under-20 football team							
(Ghana) 2023	See Senegal women's national under-20 football team							
Total	Best: Group stage	1/3	2	0	0	2	1	6

- 2019 and 2023 editions of the football tournament was played by the U-20 team.

=== WAFU Zone A Women's Cup ===
Senegal have participated in the WAFU Zone A Women's Tournament since its inception in 2020 and are the competition's most successful team, having won two titles and reached every final to date.

African Games record
Host nation and year	Round	Pos	Pld	W	D	L	GF	GA	Squad
(Sierra Leone) 2020	Champions	1st	5	4	1	0	9	2	Squad
(Cape Verde) 2023	Champions	1st	5	5	0	0	17	1	Squad
(Mauritania) 2025	Final	2nd	5	3	1	1	10	3	Squad
Total	Best: Champions	3/3	15	12	2	1	36	6	–

=== Other tournaments ===
Tournament	Round	Pos
(Ivory Coast) 2018 WAFU Zone B Women's Cup	Group stage	6th
(Ivory Coast) 2019 WAFU Zone B Women's Cup	Group stage	7th

== See also ==
- List of women's national association football teams
- Senegal women's national under-20 football team
- Senegal women's national under-17 football team
- Senegalese Women's Championship
- Football in Senegal
