= Selam Zeray =

Ethiopian footballer

Selam Zeray (Amharic: ሰላም ዘርአይ) is an Ethiopian football manager who manages the Liberia women's national football team.

== Early life ==
Zeray grew up in Addis Ababa, Ethiopia.

== Playing career ==
Zeray played football before working as manager of the Ethiopia women's national football team for Olympics and Women's Africa Cup of Nations qualification.

== Managerial career ==
In 2023, Zeray was appointed manager of the Liberia women's national football team, becoming the first Ethiopian manager to manage a foreign national team.

== Personal life ==
Zeray holds a CAF A License.
