= 1982 Úrvalsdeild =

Úrvalsdeild
- Season: 1982

Statistics of Úrvalsdeild in the 1982 season.

== Overview ==
It was contested by 10 teams, and Víkingur won the championship. Víkingur's Heimir Karlsson and ÍBV's Sigurlás Þorleifsson were the joint top scorers with 10 goals.

== Final league table ==
Pos	Team	Pld	W	D	L	GF	GA	GD	Pts	Qualification or relegation
1	Víkingur (C)	18	7	9	2	25	17	+8	23	Qualification for the European Cup first round
2	ÍBV	18	9	4	5	23	16	+7	22	Qualification for the UEFA Cup first round
3	KR	18	5	11	2	14	12	+2	21	
4	ÍA	18	6	6	6	22	20	+2	18	Qualification for the Cup Winners' Cup first round
5	Valur	18	6	5	7	21	16	+5	17	
6	ÍBÍ	18	6	5	7	27	30	−3	17	
7	Breiðablik	18	6	5	7	18	22	−4	17	
8	Keflavík	18	5	6	7	14	19	−5	16	
9	Fram (R)	18	4	7	7	17	23	−6	15	Relegation to 1. deild karla
10	KA (R)	18	4	6	8	18	24	−6	14	Relegation to 1. deild karla

Source: RSSSF
Rules for classification: 1) points; 2) goal difference; 3) number of goals scored.
(C) Champions; (R) Relegated

== Results ==
Each team played every opponent once home and away for a total of 18 matches.

Home \ Away	BRE	FRA	ÍA	ÍBÍ	ÍBV	KA	ÍBK	KR	VAL	VÍK
Breiðablik		1–0	2–1	0–2	2–1	2–1	3–0	0–2	0–1	1–1
Fram	2–2		2–2	0–4	3–0	1–2	0–2	0–2	1–1	2–1
ÍA	3–1	0–1		2–1	1–2	1–0	2–1	1–1	2–0	2–2
ÍBÍ	3–0	0–2	1–4		1–2	1–2	0–0	1–1	1–4	2–2
ÍBV	0–0	2–0	2–0	3–1		2–2	2–0	0–1	2–0	2–2
KA	0–2	0–0	0–0	2–3	0–1		0–0	3–0	1–2 (Note: Valur fielded an unauthorized player and the match was verified in favor of the opponents without altering the score.)	0–2
Keflavík	1–0	1–1	1–0	1–1	0–1	3–2		0–0	2–1	0–1
KR	1–1	1–1	0–0	2–2	1–0	0–0	0–0		1–0	1–1
Valur	2–0	1–0	3–1	1–0	1–1	2–2	2–1	0–0		0–1
Víkingur	1–1	1–1	0–0	2–3	1–0	2–1	3–1	2–0	0–0	

Source: RSSSF
Legend: Blue = home team win; Yellow = draw; Red = away team win.
