= Izetta Sombo Wesley =

Liberian football officer

Izetta Sombo Wesley is the head of the Liberia Football Association, which governs football in Liberia, including the national football team. Wesley was the first woman in Africa to head a football association when she took control in February 2004. Wesley was re-elected in March 2006 for a 4-year period.

== Sources ==
- "Can women help improve football in Africa?" 4 March, 2004, BBC News
- "Two Solid Punches Retain Izetta Until 2010" 20 March 2006, The Liberian Observer
