= Oulun Tervahiihto =

Ski marathon in Oulu, Finland

Oulun Tervahiihto or Tervahiihto is an annual ski marathon held in Oulu, Finland. Held since 1889, it is the longest-running annual long-distance ski race in the world. Races include 40km and 70km in both traditional and skating styles, and the terrain is mostly flat.

In 2005 the race formally became affiliated to the FIS with the founding of the FIS Nordic Ski Marathon Cup, a series which includes the Holmenkollen Skimaraton in Norway, Tornedalsloppet in Sweden, the Fossavatn Ski Marathon in Iceland and the Oulun Tervahiihto. The race is now usually the second race of the cup, held in March.
