= Mano River Union =

Association in West Africa

Mano River Union Union du fleuve Mano (French)
- Logo of the Mano River Union

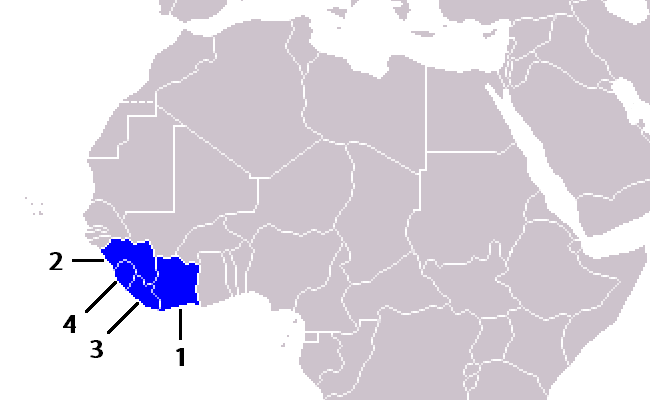
- Members of the Mano River Union
- Secretariat: Freetown, Sierra Leone
- Membership: (1) Côte d'Ivoire, (2) Guinea, (3) Liberia, and (4) Sierra Leone

Leaders
  - Secretary-General: Simeon M-B. Moribah, Liberia

Establishment
  - Mano River Declaration: 3 October 1973 (53 years ago)
  - Reactivated: 2004 (22 years ago)
- Website www.mru.int

The Mano River Union (MRU) is an international association initially established between Liberia and Sierra Leone by the 3 October 1973 Mano River Declaration. It is named for the Mano River which begins in the Guinea highlands and forms a border between Liberia and Sierra Leone. On 25 October 1980, Guinea joined the union.

The goal of the Union was to "accelerate the economic growth, social progress and cultural advancement of our two countries ... by active collaboration and mutual assistance in matters of common interest in economic, social, technical, scientific and administrative fields". However, due to internal conflicts within the two original MRU countries (the Sierra Leone Civil War [1991-2002] and the First [1989-1997] and Second Liberian Civil Wars [1999-2003]), these objectives could not be achieved. The staff numbered 600 in 1986, but was down to 300 in 1993, then to 120, and 48 in 2000.

On 20 May 2004, the Union was reactivated at a summit of the three leaders of the Mano River Union states: Presidents Lansana Conté of Guinea and Ahmad Tejan Kabbah of Sierra Leone and Chairman Gyude Bryant of Liberia. On 15 May 2008, Côte d'Ivoire agreed to join the union.

== Organizational structure ==
The MRU is run by a secretariat, headed by a Secretary-General. Ambassador Simeon M-B. Harrison is the current Secretary-General of the Mano River Union. He became the 10th Secretary General. He replaced Madam Maria G. Harrison in May 2024. When Secretary-General Habib Diallo was killed in a car crash in 2011, his successor was the first woman to hold that office: Dr Saran Daraba Kaba. The Mano River Union Secretariat is based in Freetown, Sierra Leone, with offices in Conakry, Guinea and Monrovia, Liberia. In April 2016 the Union announced plans to form a Mano River Union Parliament, where legislators from the four member states will work to coordinate national legislation on matters of regional importance. This idea was launched on July 20, 2025, in Congo Town, Monrovia.

== Secretaries-General of the MRU ==
- Dr. Cyril A. Bright, Liberia (1974–1978)
- T. Ernest Eastman, Liberia (1978–1983)
- Dr. Augustus F. Caine, Liberia (1983–1987)
- Dr. Abdoulaye Diallo, Guinea (1988–2005)
- Abraham Boure, Guinea (2007–2010)
- Habib Diallo, Guinea (2010–2011)
- Dr. Hadja Saran Daraba Kaba, Guinea (2011–2017)
- Amb. Mrs. Medina A. Wesseh Esq, Liberia (2017–2022)
- Amb. Maria G. Harrison, Liberia (2022–2024)
- Amb. Mr. Simeon M-B. Moribah, Liberia (2024–)
