= Vestri (women's football) =

- Full name: Íþróttafélagið Vestri
- Founded: 1988; 38 years ago, as BÍ'88; 2006; 20 years ago as BÍ/Bolungarvík; 2016; 10 years ago as Vestri
- Ground: Kerecisvöllurinn, Ísafjörður
- Capacity: 1,596
- Manager: Kristján Arnar Ingason
- League: 2. deild kvenna
Home colours	Away colours

The Vestri women's football team, commonly known as Vestri, is a football team based in Ísafjörður, Iceland. It is the women's football department of Íþróttafélagið Vestri multi-sport club.

== History ==
After ÍBÍ women's team folded before the 1988 season, a women's team was founded under the BÍ'88 name and took its spot in the top-tier 1. deild kvenna. They won the then second-tier 2. deild kvenna in 1989 but withdrew from the top-tier 1. deild kvenna prior to the 1990 season and did not field a team again until 1992. The team last played during the 2015 season in the second-tier 1. deild kvenna when it fielded a joint team with Íþróttafélag Reykjavíkur under the name ÍR/BÍ/Bolungarvík.

In 2023, the club registered a women's team for the 2024 season in 2. deild kvenna and hired Kristján Arnar Ingason as the new head coach.

== Player of the year ==
Year	Winner
1988	(Iceland) Sigrún Sigurðardóttir
2006	(Iceland) Karítas Sigurlaug Ingimarsdóttir
2012	(Iceland) Silja Runólfsdóttir
2013	(Iceland) Hildur Hálfdánardóttir
2014	(Iceland) Hildur Hálfdánardóttir

== Former notable players ==
Players who have played for Vestri (BÍ'88, BÍ/Bolungarvík) and earned international caps at senior level. Correct as of 18 January 2024.

Nat.	Player	Date of birth	Current club	Position	International career
(Iceland)	Ingibjörg Jónsdóttir	6 March 1959 (age 67)	retired	Forward	1986–1987
(Iceland)	Rósa Valdimarsdóttir	6 March 1959 (age 67)	retired		1981–1984
(Iceland)	Stella Hjaltadóttir	23 June 1967 (age 58)	retired	Forward	1987
(Iceland)	Vala Úlfljótsdóttir	23 October 1961 (age 64)	retired	Goalkeeper	1985–1987

== Managerial history ==
Dates	Name	Notes
1988	(Iceland) Örnólfur Oddsson	
1989	(Iceland) Rúnar Guðmundsson	
1992	(Iceland) Björn Helgason	
1993	(Iceland) Örnólfur Oddsson	
2000	(Iceland) Dögg Lára Sigurgeirsdóttir	Player-manager
2006	(Iceland) Tómas Emil Guðmundsson	
2007	(Iceland) Sigþór Snorrason	
2012–2014	(Iceland) Jónas Leifur Sigursteinsson	
2015	(Iceland) Halldór Þorvaldur Halldórsson	As ÍR/BÍ/Bolungarvík
2023–present	(Iceland) Kristján Arnar Ingason	

== Honours ==
- 1. deild kvenna
  - Winners (1): 1989
