= Liberia women's national football team =

Liberia
- Association: Liberia Football Association
- Confederation: CAF (Africa)
- Sub-confederation: WAFU (West Africa)
- Head coach: Selam Kebede
- FIFA code: LBR
First colors	Second colors

FIFA ranking
- Current: 171 (16 June 2026)
- Highest: 141 (March – June 2007)
- Lowest: 170 (December 2025)

First international
- Liberia 0–3 Ethiopia (Monrovia; 18 February 2007)

Biggest win
- Liberia 4–0 Guinea-Bissau (Makeni; 26 February 2020)

Biggest defeat
- Liberia 0–7 Ghana (Accra; 27 February 2011)

The Liberia women's national football team represents Liberia in international women's football. It is governed by the Liberia Football Association. It has played in five FIFA recognized matches.

== History ==
=== Background and development ===
The kind of football we have seen here shows that women [sic] football can no longer be regarded as novelty. I am proud to be a woman, watching these ladies display skill and ability that are even rare to see in the men's game. My call is to governments and big companies in Africa to grant women's football more support. If the men are going anywhere to play, the government will find the money. But when it is the women, you see them talking about lack of funds. When our national U-20 team was to play Algeria in the Fifa World Cup qualifiers, the government said they didn't have any money. But I went to Fifa and got them to fund our trip. But after we beat Algeria and then drew with Nigeria in the first leg of the last round of qualifiers, suddenly everyone wanted to be part of the trip to Nigeria. Suddenly the money became available for government officials to travel to Nigeria. There is a lot of insincerity in the way we deal with the women. That should be stopped.

— Izetta Sombo Wesley, female football administrator

Early development of the women's game at the time colonial powers brought football to the continent was limited as colonial powers in the region tended to take make concepts of patriarchy and women's participation in sport with them to local cultures that had similar concepts already embedded in them. The lack of later development of the national team on a wider international level symptomatic of all African teams is a result of several factors, including limited access to education, poverty amongst women in the wider society, and fundamental inequality present in the society that occasionally allows for female specific human rights abuses. When quality female football players are developed, they tend to leave for greater opportunities abroad. Continent wide, funding is also an issue, with most development money coming from FIFA, not the national football association. Future, success for women's football in Africa is dependent on improved facilities and access by women to these facilities. Attempting to commercialize the game and make it commercially viable is not the solution, as demonstrated by the current existence of many youth and women's football camps held throughout the continent.

The national federation, Liberia Football Association, was founded in 1936. It became a FIFA affiliate in 1962. Women's football is represented on the committee by specific constitutional mandate. In 2009, the organization did not have any full-time staff members specifically dedicated to assisting women's football. Their kit includes red shirts, white shorts and red socks.

Football is the most popular women's participation sport in the country. A women's football program was first organized by the national federation in the country in 1988. In 2000, there were 264 registered female players in the country. In 2006, there were 277 players. In 2006, there were only two women's only teams available for women to play on while there were 43 teams for men to play on. By 2009, regional and national women's football competitions had been established, but no competition had been organized for UL or schools. Rights to broadcast the 2011 Women's World Cup in the country were bought by the African Union of Broadcasting.

Jamesetta Howard has served as the country's Minister of Youth and Sports. The national football association president was Izetta Sombo Wesley. The country's president was Ellen Johnson-Sirleaf. All were women and all supported the women's national team. In 2007, Izetta Wesley was named a member of the FIFA Women's Football Committee and that of FIFA Women's World Cup, with her term starting in 2008. She has also served as the Match Commissioner of CAF and FIFA, and Vice President of the West African Football Union (WAFU).

=== The team ===
Liberia played their first FIFA recognized match in February 2007 though the team played three non-recognized games in 2006. National team matches have been played at Antoinette Tubman Stadium.

On 18 February 2007 in a game in Monrovia, Liberia lost to Ethiopia women's national football team 0–3 after having been down 0–1 at the half. On 10 March in a game in Addis Abeba, Liberia lost to Ethiopia 0–2 after being down 0–1 at the half. In 2010, the country did not have a team competing in the African Women's Championships. The country did not have a team competing at the 2011 All Africa Games. On 13 February 2011 in a game in Monrovia, Liberia lost to Ghana by a score of 0–4. On 27 February in a game in Accra, Liberia lost to Ghana 0–7.

Liberia's international ranking improved in the late 2000s before falling in the early 2010s: in 2007, it was ranked 144; in 2008, 117; in 2009, 92; in 2010, 128; in 2011, 136; and in 2012, 130, while holding 35th place in Africa.

== Team image ==
=== Other national teams ===
==== U17 team ====
In 2006, there was no FIFA recognized youth national team. They participated in the African Women U-17 Championship 2008. In the preliminary round, they were supposed to play Benin but Benin withdrew from the competition. In the first round, they were supposed to play Nigeria but they withdrew from the competition.

==== U19/U20 team ====
In 2006, there was no FIFA recognized youth national team. Between 2002 and 2010 in the FIFA Women U19/U20 World Cup, a U19 event up until 2006 when it became U20, the country participated in the qualifying tournament.

The country participated in the African Women U-20 Championship 2006. They were supposed to play Guinea in Round 1 but Guinea withdrew from the tournament. In Round 2, they played their first match in Algeria, where they won 3–2. Algeria withdrew from the tournament before playing in the return match in Liberia. They met Nigeria in the quarterfinals, tying 1–1 in one match, before losing 1–9 in the second.

==== Homeless World Cup team ====
In 2008, a national team represented the country at the Homeless World Cup. In the opening round robin round where they finished second, they beat Cameroon 16–1, beat Colombia 8–5, lost to Zambia 1–4, beat Paraguay 4–1, beat Uganda 7–2, beat Kyrgyzstan 7–3, and beat Australia 14–3. In the semi-final, they tied Colombia 1–1, and won 1–0 in penalty kicks. They lost to Zambia 1–7 in the final.

==== Amputee football team ====
A woman's team from the country competed at the 2011 Cup of African Nations for Amputee Football. In that year, they played Ghana in a friendly in Monrovia, Liberia in the lead up to the competition.

== Results and fixtures ==
The following is a list of match results in the last 12 months, as well as any future matches that have been scheduled.

Win Draw Lose Fixture

== Coaching staff ==
=== Current coaching staff ===
As of 6 August 2021

Position	Name	Ref.
Head coach	(Ethiopia) Selam Kebede	

=== Manager history ===
- (Liberia) Famatta Dean (2019–2020)
- (Liberia) Robert Lartey (2020–2021)
- (Ethiopia) Selam Kebede (2023–present)

== Players ==
=== Current squad ===
- The following players were named For 2025 WAFU Zone A Women's Cup announced on 12 May 2025.
- Caps and goals accurate up to and including 30 October 2021.

No.	Pos.	Player	Date of birth (age)	Club
	GK	Anita Davis		(Liberia Football Association) Determine Girls
	DF	Aline Capehart		(Liberia Football Association) Ambassadors
	DF	Sangay Moulton		(Liberia Football Association) Kneeling Warriors
	DF	Diamond Dahn	21 February 2004 (age 22)	(Liberia Football Association) Determine Girls
	DF	Margret Stewart	24 February 1998 (age 28)	(Liberia Football Association) Determine Girls
	DF	Ditta Langama		(Liberia Football Association) Determine Girls
	DF	Francisca Howe		(Liberia Football Association) Shaita Angels
	MF	Louise Brown	13 May 2005 (age 21)	(Liberia Football Association) Determine Girls
	MF	Bendu Yantay		(Liberia Football Association) SFP FC
	MF	Jessica Quachie	15 December 2006 (age 19)	(Israel Football Association) Katamon Jerusalem
	MF	Wonder Juery		(Liberia Football Association) World Girls
	MF	Coslyn Bardy		(Liberia Football Association) LEAD Monrovia FA
	MF	Christine Kouadio		(Liberia Football Association) Kneeling Warriors
	FW	Lucy Kikeh		(Liberia Football Association) Shaita Angels
	FW	Miatta Morris		(Liberia Football Association) Shaita Angels
	FW	Dalphine Glao		(Liberia Football Association) Real Muja
	FW	Makasian Sayon		(Liberia Football Association) Ravia Angels
	FW	Mimi Eiden	2 May 1999 (age 27)	(Football Association of Iceland) Vestri
	FW	Cynthia Weah		(Liberia Football Association) Shaita Angels

=== Recent call-ups ===
The following players have been called up to a Liberia squad in the past 12 months.

Pos.	Player	Date of birth (age)	Caps	Goals	Club	Latest call-up

== Records ==
*Active players in bold, statistics correct as of 6 August 2021.

=== Most capped players ===
#	Player	Year(s)	Caps

=== Top goalscorers ===
As of May 29, 2025

#	Player	Year(s)	Goals	Caps
1	Lucy Kikeh	—N/a	4	—N/a
2	Lucy Massaquoi	—N/a	3	—N/a
2	Angeline Kieh	—N/a	3	—N/a
2	Hawa Kpan	—N/a	3	—N/a
5	Pauline Agbotsu	—N/a	2	—N/a
5	Kantie Sayee	—N/a	2	—N/a
5	Margaret Stewart	—N/a	2	—N/a
5	Miatta Morris	—N/a	2	—N/a
5	Dalphine Glao	2023–present	2	—N/a
5	Mimi Eiden	2021–present	2	8
11	Agatha Nimene	—N/a	1	—N/a
11	Bernice Willie	—N/a	1	—N/a
11	Makasian Saryon	—N/a	1	—N/a
11	Jessica Quachie	2023–present	1	—N/a
11	Bendu Yantay	—N/a	1	—N/a

== Competitive record ==
=== FIFA Women's World Cup ===
Up to 2025, the team made only one attempt at qualification, but did not manage to advance.

FIFA Women's World Cup record
Year	Result	Pld	W	D*	L	GF	GA	GA	Coach
(China) 1991 to (China) 2007	Did not exist								
(Germany) 2011 to (France) 2019	Did not enter								
(Australia) (New Zealand) 2023	Did not qualify								
(Brazil) 2027	Did not enter								
(Mexico) (United States) 2031	To be determined								
(United Kingdom) 2035	To be determined								
Total	0/1	—	—	—	—	—	—	—	

*Draws include knockout matches decided on penalty kicks.

=== Olympic Games ===
As of 2025, the team has made two attempts to qualify for the Games, failing in the first and withdrawing from the second.

(International Olympic Committee) Olympic Games record
Year	Result	Pld	W	D*	L	GF	GA	GA	Coach
(United States) 1996 to (Greece) 2004	Did not exist								
(China) 2008	Did not qualify								
(United Kingdom) 2012	Did not enter								
(Brazil) 2016	Withdrew								
(Japan) 2020	Did not enter								
(France) 2024	Did not enter								
(United States) 2028	To be determined								
(Australia) 2032	To be determined								
Total	0/2	—	—	—	—	—	—	—	

*Draws include knockout matches decided on penalty kicks.

=== Women's Africa Cup of Nations ===
Africa Women's Cup of Nations record
Year	Result	Pld	W	D*	L	GF	GA	GA	Coach
1991 to (Nigeria) 2006	Did not exist								
(Equatorial Guinea) 2008 to (Ghana) 2018	Did not enter								
2020	Cancelled due to the COVID-19 pandemic in Africa								
(Morocco) 2022	Did not qualify								
(Morocco) 2024	Did not qualify								
(Morocco) 2026	Did not enter								
Total	0/2	—	—	—	—	—	—	—	

*Draws include knockout matches decided on penalty kicks.

=== African Games ===
African Games record
Year	Result	Pld	W	D*	L	GF	GA	GA	Coach
(Nigeria) 2003	Did not exist								
(Algeria) 2007	Did not enter								
(Mozambique) 2011	Did not qualify								
(Republic of the Congo) 2015 to (Morocco) 2019	Did not enter								
Since (Ghana) 2023	See Liberia women's national under-20 football team								
Total	0/1	—	—	—	—	—	—	—	

=== WAFU Zone A Women's Cup ===
WAFU Zone A Women's Cup record
Year	Result	Pld	W	D*	L	GF	GA	GA	Coach
(Sierra Leone) 2020	Third place	5	3	0	2	8	6	+2	Robert Lartey
(Cape Verde) 2023	Withdrew								
(Mauritania) 2025	Third place	5	2	2	1	6	4	+2	(Ethiopia) Selam Kebede
Total	2/3	10	5	2	3	14	10	+4	

*Draws include knockout matches decided on penalty kicks.
