= Stadium of Ksar =

Sports field in Mauritania

Coordinates: 18°5′57″N 15°57′33″W

The Stadium of Ksar is a sports field in northeastern Nouakchott, Mauritania. It is located to the northeast of the Presidential Palace, near the Old Fort and College d'Application.
