= Íþróttabandalag Ísafjarðar =

ÍBÍ
- Full name: Íþróttabandalag Ísafjarðar
- Founded: 23 April 1946
- Folded: 2000

Íþróttabandalag Ísafjarðar (Icelandic pronunciation: [ˈiːˌθrouhtaˌpantaˌlaɣ ˈiːsaˌfjarðar̥], lit. 'Ísafjörður Sports Union'), commonly known as ÍBÍ, was a sports union in Ísafjörður, Iceland, best known for its football teams. In 2000, ÍBÍ merged with Héraðssamband Vestur-Ísfirðinga to form Héraðssamband Vestfirðinga.

== Football ==
ÍBÍ
- Full name: Íþróttabandalag Ísafjarðar
- Short name: ÍBÍ
- Founded: 1955 (men's team); 1981 (women's team)
- Dissolved: 1988
- Ground: Torfnesvöllur, Ísafjörður, Iceland

=== Men's football ===
ÍBÍ's men's football team was founded in 1955 and participated in the Icelandic top-tier league in 1962, 1982 and 1983. It folded prior to the 1988 season due to financial difficulties and most of the players transferred over to Boltafélag Ísafjarðar.

==== Honours ====
- 1. deild karla:
  - Winners (1): 1961^{1}
  - Runner-up: (1): 1981^{1}

^{1} Then known as 2. deild karla

- 2. deild karla:
  - Winners (1): 1973^{1}
  - Runner-up: (1): 1969^{1}

^{1} Then known as 3. deild karla

=== Managers ===
- Gísli Magnússon 1973
- Gísli Magnússon 1978
- Martin Wilkinson 1983
- Gísli Magnússon 1984–1985
- Jón Oddsson 1986
- Helgi Ragnarsson 1987

=== Women's football ===
ÍBÍ's women's team was founded in 1981 and participated in the Football Cup that year. It competed in the Icelandic top-tier league in 1984 and 1985. It won the second-tier league in 1987 but the club folded just before the 1988 season and most of the players moved to BÍ which took its spot in the top-tier league.

==== Honours ====
- 1. deild kvenna:
  - Winners (1): 1987^{1}
  - Runner-up (1): 1983^{1}

^{1} Then known as 2. deild kvenna

==== Managers ====
- Jóhann Torfason 1981
- Þór Albertsson 1982
- Bjarni Jóhannsson 1983
- Rósa Áslaug Valdimarsdóttir 1984
- Jóhann Torfason 1985
- Jón E. Haraldsson 1986–1987
