= 2025 WAFU Zone A Women's Cup squads =

Football tournament squads

The 2025 WAFU Zone A Women's Cup is the upcoming international women's association football tournament to be held in Nouakchott, Mauritania from 18 to 31 May 2025. Each of the eight national teams participating in the tournament was required to submit a squad of at least 20 players, including two goalkeepers. Only players included in these squads were eligible to take part in the tournament. In the event of a serious injury or illness prior to a team’s first match, a player could be replaced.

The age listed for each player is their age as of 19 May 2025, the first day of the tournament. The club listed is the club for which the player last played a competitive match prior to the tournament. The nationality for each club reflects the national association (not the league) to which the club is affiliated. A flag is included for coaches who are of a different nationality to their team.

== Group A ==
=== Mauritania ===
The squad was announced on 20 May 2025.

Head coach: (Spain) Jordi Arimany

No.	Pos.	Player	Date of birth (age)	Club
1	GK	Salimata Samba		(Football Federation of the Islamic Republic of Mauritania) FC Nouadhibou
16	GK	Aissata Fall		(Football Federation of the Islamic Republic of Mauritania) FC Nouadhibou
	GK	Marietou Sagna		(Football Federation of the Islamic Republic of Mauritania) AS Douanes
10	DF	Fatou Diop	5 May 1994 (aged 31)	(Royal Moroccan Football Federation) Union Touarga
12	DF	Maimouna Diallo		(Football Federation of the Islamic Republic of Mauritania) FC Nouadhibou
	DF	Meije Cissé		(Senegalese Football Federation) FC Baobab
	DF	Fatimata Sall		(Football Federation of the Islamic Republic of Mauritania) ASC Snim
	DF	Coumba Gueye		(Royal Moroccan Football Federation) Lionnes Assa-Mahbès
	DF	Salma Moktar Vall		(Football Federation of the Islamic Republic of Mauritania) AS Douanes
7	MF	Ramata Gangué		(Royal Moroccan Football Federation) AM Laâyoune
13	MF	Halima Diallo		(Football Federation of the Islamic Republic of Mauritania) ASC Snim
14	MF	Leila Bilal		(Football Federation of the Islamic Republic of Mauritania) FC Nouadhibou
15	MF	Ami Gaye		(Football Federation of the Islamic Republic of Mauritania) FC Nouadhibou
18	MF	El Ghaiba Fall		(Football Federation of the Islamic Republic of Mauritania) Chemal FC
	MF	Rougui Dia		(Football Federation of the Islamic Republic of Mauritania) Chemal FC
9	FW	Zeinabou Ahmed		(Football Federation of the Islamic Republic of Mauritania) Chemal FC
11	FW	Tacko Diabira	28 April 1999 (aged 26)	(Senegalese Football Federation) AS Dakar Sacré-Cœur
	FW	Aminata Diakite		(Football Federation of the Islamic Republic of Mauritania) FC Nouadhibou
	FW	Hawa Dicko		(Football Federation of the Islamic Republic of Mauritania) AS Douanes
	FW	Marième Diadie Traoré		(Football Federation of the Islamic Republic of Mauritania) FC Nouadhibou

=== Mali ===
The squad was announced on 15 May 2025.

Head coach: Mohamed Saloum Oussein

No.	Pos.	Player	Date of birth (age)	Club
1	GK	Fatoumata Karentao (Captain)	8 November 1990 (aged 34)	(Malian Football Federation) USFAS
	GK	Sadio Sow	17 November 2002 (aged 22)	(Malian Football Federation) AS Mandé
3	DF	Fatou Dembele	30 November 2000 (aged 24)	(Royal Spanish Football Federation) UD Tenerife
13	DF	Fatoumata Ongoiba		(Malian Football Federation) AS Police
17	DF	Maimouna Traoré	1 January 1998 (aged 27)	(Malian Football Federation) AS Police
18	DF	Aicha Samake	13 September 1994 (aged 30)	(Royal Moroccan Football Federation) SC Casablanca
	DF	Korotoumou Keita	12 June 2000 (aged 24)	(Malian Football Federation) AS Mandé
	DF	Djelika Diarra		(Malian Football Federation) Amazone CV
6	MF	Hawa Traoré		(Malian Football Federation) AS Police
7	MF	Fatoumata Diarra	15 April 1986 (aged 39)	(Tanzania Football Federation) Tausi FC
20	MF	Aïssata Tapily		(Malian Football Federation) AS Police
	MF	Awa Diarra		(Malian Football Federation) AS Police
	MF	Bintou Koité	20 November 1995 (aged 29)	(Saudi Arabian Football Federation) United Eagles FC
	MF	Aminata Dia	14 June 1998 (aged 26)	(Malian Football Federation) AS Mandé
9	FW	Oumou Kone	20 December 1999 (aged 25)	(Malian Football Federation) USFAS
10	FW	Agueissa Diarra	30 July 1998 (aged 26)	(French Football Federation) Paris Saint-Germain
11	FW	Salimata Diarra	24 October 1994 (aged 30)	(Royal Moroccan Football Federation) RS Berkane
14	FW	Aïssata Traoré	9 September 1997 (aged 27)	(French Football Federation) FC Fleury 91
15	FW	Kadidiatou Diabate	5 February 2007 (aged 18)	(Malian Football Federation) AS Police
	FW	Kadidja Teme		(Royal Moroccan Football Federation) CJ Ben Guerir

=== Guinea-Bissau ===
The squad was announced on 13 May 2025.

Head coach: João Domingos

No.	Pos.	Player	Date of birth (age)	Club
1	GK	Lira Brandão Nhaga		(Football Federation of Guinea-Bissau) Fidjus di Bideras TCB
12	GK	Adji Saco		(Football Federation of Guinea-Bissau) Fidjus di Bideras TCB
2	DF	Latifa Fati Gomes Sarr		(Football Federation of Guinea-Bissau) Fidjus di Bideras TCB
3	DF	Binta Ansumane Mané		(Football Federation of Guinea-Bissau) Sporting Clube Bissau
4	DF	Julia Mendes		(Football Federation of Guinea-Bissau) SB Benfica
5	DF	Fatumata Zacarias Bá		(Football Federation of Guinea-Bissau) SB Benfica
6	DF	Pasfan Nhaga		(Football Federation of Guinea-Bissau) Fidjus di Bideras TCB
16	DF	Sivetilana Salvador Mandeck		(Football Federation of Guinea-Bissau) Fidjus di Bideras TCB
21	DF	Adama Sissé		(Football Federation of Guinea-Bissau) SB Benfica
8	MF	Teresa Luis Sambu		(Football Federation of Guinea-Bissau) SB Benfica
10	MF	Suraia da Silva		(Football Federation of Guinea-Bissau) Fidjus di Bideras TCB
13	MF	Gadi da Silva Varela		(Football Federation of Guinea-Bissau) SB Benfica
14	MF	Ami Samba N'Dong		(Football Federation of Guinea-Bissau) Fidjus di Bideras TCB
18	MF	Luisa Paulo Mendes (Captain)		(Football Federation of Guinea-Bissau) Fidjus di Bideras TCB
	MF	Anhés Djeme		(Football Federation of Guinea-Bissau) Fidjus di Bideras TCB
	MF	Julieta Pereira		(Football Federation of Guinea-Bissau) Sporting Clube Bissau
7	FW	Flavia Ebatomog Alfredo		(Football Federation of Guinea-Bissau) FC Canchungo
9	FW	Fidélia da Costa		(Football Federation of Guinea-Bissau) SB Benfica
11	FW	Julieta Iala		(Football Federation of Guinea-Bissau) Fidjus di Bideras TCB
19	FW	Nandinha Pedro Adjutubebe		(Football Federation of Guinea-Bissau) GDR Quelélé

=== Liberia ===
The squad was announced on 12 May 2025.

Head coach: (Ethiopia) Selam Kebede

No.	Pos.	Player	Date of birth (age)	Club
1	GK	Anita Davis		(Liberia Football Association) Determine Girls
16	GK	Albertha Pratt		(Liberia Football Association) Shaita Angels
2	DF	Diamond Dahn	21 February 2004 (aged 21)	(Liberia Football Association) Determine Girls
3	DF	Ditta Langama		(Liberia Football Association) Determine Girls
4	DF	Francisca Howe	30 April 2000 (aged 25)	(Liberia Football Association) Shaita Angels
5	DF	Choice Tokpah	28 May 2004 (aged 20)	(Liberia Football Association) SFP FC
13	DF	Sangay Moulton		(Liberia Football Association) Kneeling Warriors
17	DF	Margret Stewart (Captain)	24 February 1998 (aged 27)	(Liberia Football Association) Determine Girls
21	DF	Aline Capehart	18 February 2005 (aged 20)	(Liberia Football Association) Ambassadors
6	MF	Jessica Quachie	15 December 2006 (aged 18)	(Liberia Football Association) Determine Girls
8	MF	Louise Brown	13 May 2005 (aged 20)	(Liberia Football Association) Determine Girls
12	MF	Wonder Juery		(Liberia Football Association) World Girls
15	MF	Bendu Yantay		(Liberia Football Association) SFP FC
18	MF	Christine Kouadio		(Liberia Football Association) Kneeling Warriors
	MF	Coslyn Bardy		(Liberia Football Association) LEAD Monrovia FA
7	FW	Lucy Kikeh	20 May 1999 (aged 25)	(Liberia Football Association) Shaita Angels
10	FW	Mimi Eiden	2 May 1999 (aged 26)	(Football Association of Iceland) Vestri
11	FW	Dalphine Glao		(Liberia Football Association) Real Muja
14	FW	Makasian Sayon		(Liberia Football Association) Ravia Angels
19	FW	Miatta Morris		(Liberia Football Association) Shaita Angels
20	FW	Cynthia Weah		(Liberia Football Association) Shaita Angels

== Group B ==
=== Senegal ===
The squad was announced on 9 May 2025.

Head coach: Mame Moussa Cissé

No.	Pos.	Player	Date of birth (age)	Club
1	GK	Khady Faye	14 January 2004 (aged 21)	(Senegalese Football Federation) Aigles de la Médina
16	GK	Tening Séne	21 January 1990 (aged 35)	(Senegalese Football Federation) Jappo Olympique
21	GK	Adji Ndiaye	4 August 2006 (aged 18)	(Senegalese Football Federation) AS Bambey
3	DF	Anta Dembélé	15 June 1994 (aged 30)	(Senegalese Football Federation) Aigles de la Médina
4	DF	Aïssatou Fall	1 December 2007 (aged 17)	(Senegalese Football Federation) Kaolack FC
5	MF	Wolimata Ndiaye	10 January 2004 (aged 21)	(French Football Federation) Thonon Evian GG
6	MF	Maty Cissokho		(Senegalese Football Federation) Aigles de la Médina
8	DF	Marie Diokh	5 September 2000 (aged 24)	(Senegalese Football Federation) Aigles de la Médina
13	DF	Mariama Faty	10 January 2009 (aged 16)	(Senegalese Football Federation) Kumaré FC
18	DF	Meta Camara	14 August 1994 (aged 30)	(Turkish Football Federation) Trabzonspor
2	MF	Marème Babou	13 April 2003 (aged 22)	(French Football Federation) RC Strasbourg Alsace
7	MF	Pascaline Fofana Bassene	22 December 2002 (aged 22)	(Royal Spanish Football Federation) CD Argual
11	MF	Haby Baldé	1 January 2000 (aged 25)	(French Football Federation) ES Trois Cités Poitiers
12	MF	Safietou Sagna (Captain)	11 April 1994 (aged 31)	(French Football Federation) US Saint-Malo
14	MF	Sadigatou Diallo	21 February 2003 (aged 22)	(Senegalese Football Federation) Aigles de la Médina
15	MF	Fatoumata Dramé	28 March 2001 (aged 24)	(Senegalese Football Federation) Aigles de la Médina
19	MF	Binta Korkel Seck	11 January 1998 (aged 27)	(Senegalese Football Federation) Aigles de la Médina
20	MF	Marie Ndiaye		(Senegalese Football Federation) Jappo Olympique
9	FW	Ndèye Awa Casset		(Senegalese Football Federation) Aigles de la Médina
10	FW	Sokhna Tall Pène	11 November 2006 (aged 18)	(Senegalese Football Federation) AS Bambey
17	FW	Hapsatou Malado Diallo	14 April 2005 (aged 20)	(Turkish Football Federation) Galatasaray

=== Guinea ===
The squad was announced on 13 May 2025.

Head coach: Kaman Camara

No.	Pos.	Player	Date of birth (age)	Club
	GK	Kadiatou Bangoura	10 October 2009 (aged 15)	(Guinean Football Federation) Samgbarala
	GK	Maimouna Coumbassa		(Guinean Football Federation) Espoir Yimbaya
	DF	Mariama Diallo	30 May 2008 (aged 16)	(Guinean Football Federation) Espoir Yimbaya
	DF	Fatoumata Camara	27 October 2005 (aged 19)	(Guinean Football Federation) Horoya AC
	DF	Damayé Camara	5 November 2000 (aged 24)	(Saudi Arabian Football Federation) Abha Club
	DF	Saran Condé	30 December 1998 (aged 26)	(Sierra Leone Football Association) Sierra Leone Police
	DF	Doussou Djomgbè Camara	5 November 2004 (aged 20)	(Guinean Football Federation) C.O. Ratoma
	DF	Mamaïssata Camara	9 May 2000 (aged 25)	(Guinean Football Federation) Horoya AC
15	MF	Nana Camara	12 December 2005 (aged 19)	(Guinean Football Federation) Galaxie FC
6	MF	Aminata Camara (Captain)	13 November 2003 (aged 21)	(Royal Moroccan Football Federation) FUS Rabat
10	MF	Fatoumata Yaya Samoura	6 March 2005 (aged 20)	(Sierra Leone Football Association) Ram Kamara FC
	MF	Koulako Camara		(Guinean Football Federation) AS Bolonta
	FW	Mariama Harouna Yattara	12 February 2006 (aged 19)	(Guinean Football Federation) Samgbarala
	FW	Fatoumata Dédé Diallo	27 May 2004 (aged 20)	(Guinean Football Federation) C.O. Ratoma
	FW	Mariama Soumah	23 March 2008 (aged 17)	(Guinean Football Federation) Samgbarala
	FW	Aïssatou Diallo	2 October 2005 (aged 19)	(Guinean Football Federation) AS Bolonta
11	FW	Fanta Daouda Nabé	20 March 2007 (aged 18)	(Sierra Leone Football Association) Kallon FC
17	FW	Kany Sidibé	2 February 2004 (aged 21)	(Guinean Football Federation) AS Bolonta
9	FW	Fanta Danda Camara	5 February 2002 (aged 23)	(Saudi Arabian Football Federation) Abha Club
	FW	Souadou Baldé		(Guinean Football Federation) AS Bolonta

=== Sierra Leone ===
The squad was announced on 15 May 2025.

Head coach: Hassan Mansaray

No.	Pos.	Player	Date of birth (age)	Club
1	GK	Cecilia Bangura		(Sierra Leone Football Association)
16	GK	Kumba Conteh		(Sierra Leone Football Association) FC Kallon
21	GK	Hannah Juana		(Sierra Leone Football Association) Mogbwemo Queens
3	DF	Juliet Brima		(Sierra Leone Football Association) FC Kallon
4	DF	Kumba Abu		(Sierra Leone Football Association)
5	DF	Mabel Gbongay		(Sierra Leone Football Association) Mogbwemo Queens
11	DF	Rashidatu Aminata Kamara		(Sierra Leone Football Association)
13	DF	Fatmata Foday Kanu		(Sierra Leone Football Association)
15	DF	Juliana Fatmata Mansaray		(Sierra Leone Football Association)
6	MF	Jeneba Koroma	11 May 1999 (aged 26)	(Sierra Leone Football Association) Mogbwemo Queens
7	MF	Salamatu Kamara (Captain)	6 July 1999 (aged 25)	(Sierra Leone Football Association) Ram Kamara FC
8	MF	Kadiatu Abdulai Kamara		(Sierra Leone Football Association) Ram Kamara FC
10	MF	Sarah Bangura		(Sierra Leone Football Association) FC Kallon
12	MF	Abibatu Dollar Bangura		(Sierra Leone Football Association) Sierra Leone Police
14	MF	Fatmata Turay		(Sierra Leone Football Association) Mogbwemo Queens
9	FW	Kumba Zainab Brima		(Sierra Leone Football Association) FC Kallon
17	FW	Marian Jumu		(Sierra Leone Football Association) Mena Queens FC
18	FW	Wuyah Mohai	22 November 2001 (aged 23)	(Sierra Leone Football Association) Mogbwemo Queens
19	FW	Adama Mansaray		(Sierra Leone Football Association) Ram Kamara FC
20	FW	Marie Bockarie Conteh		(Sierra Leone Football Association) Mena Queens FC

=== The Gambia ===
The squad was announced on 16 May 2025.

Head coach: Mariama Sowe

No.	Pos.	Player	Date of birth (age)	Club
1	GK	Aminata Gaye	3 March 1996 (aged 29)	(Gambia Football Federation) Police FC
18	GK	Matty Manga	5 March 2001 (aged 24)	(Gambia Football Federation) Police FC
20	GK	Mariama Ceesay	22 January 1998 (aged 27)	(Gambia Football Federation) Red Scorpions
3	DF	Juwana Colley		(Gambia Football Federation) Koita FC
4	DF	Ellen Gai	28 July 2001 (aged 23)	(Ghana Football Association) Lady Strikers
13	DF	Ruggy Joof (Captain)	13 April 2001 (aged 24)	(Liberia Football Association) Determine Girls
14	DF	Fatoumatta Jammeh		(Gambia Football Federation) Red Scorpions
15	DF	Jarra Jambang		(Gambia Football Federation) TMT FC
2	MF	Mbassey Darboe	20 May 1998 (aged 26)	(Liberia Football Association) Determine Girls
5	MF	Bintou Ceesay	18 February 2001 (aged 24)	(Gambia Football Federation) Police FC
7	MF	Kaddy Bayo		(Gambia Football Federation) Red Scorpions
11	MF	Fatou Fatty	11 November 1997 (aged 27)	(Gambia Football Federation) Red Scorpions
19	MF	Mariama Cham		(Gambia Football Federation) Red Scorpions
6	FW	Kaddy Jarju	2 January 2004 (aged 21)	(Liberia Football Association) Shaita Angels
8	FW	Catherine Jatta	21 November 2001 (aged 23)	(Liberia Football Association) Determine Girls
9	FW	Isatou Jallow	10 October 1997 (aged 27)	(Senegalese Football Federation) AS Bambey
10	FW	Fatou Kanteh	2 July 1997 (aged 27)	(Royal Spanish Football Federation) Sevilla FC
12	FW	Fatou Sonko	16 January 2001 (aged 24)	(Gambia Football Federation) Police FC
16	FW	Salimata Saidykhan	23 January 2005 (aged 20)	(Liberia Football Association) Shaita Angels
17	FW	Mam Drammeh	10 April 2001 (aged 24)	(Senegalese Football Federation) AS Bambey
