= 2026 CAF Women's Champions League WAFU Zone A Qualifiers =

Tournament details
- Host country: Gambia
- Dates: 25 August − 6 September
- Teams: 6 (from 6 associations)

Final positions
- Champions: (Mali) USFAS Bamako (women) (2nd title)
- Runners-up: (Senegal) Aigles de la Médina

Tournament statistics
- Matches played: 9
- Goals scored: 25 (2.78 per match)
- Top scorer: (The Gambia) Sarah Jarju(4 goals)
- All statistics correct as of 6 September 2026.

The 2026 CAF Women's Champions League WAFU Zone A Qualifiers is the 6th edition of CAF Women's Champions League WAFU Zone A tournament organized by the WAFU for the women's clubs of association nations. This edition will be held in Gambia from 29 July to 11 August 2026. The winners of the tournament qualify for the 2026 CAF Women's Champions League final tournament.

== Participating teams ==
The following six teams contested in the qualifying tournament.

Team	Qualifying method	Appearances	Previous best performance
(The Gambia) Berewuleng FC	2025–26 GFF Women's League Division One Champions	2nd	Third (2025)
(Guinea) AS Bolonta	2025–26 Guinea Women's League 1 Champions	1st	n/a
(Liberia) Determine Girls	2025–26 Liberian Women's Champions	5th	Champions (2022)
(Mali) USFAS Bamako	2025–26 Malian Women's Champions	2nd	Champions (2025)
(Senegal) Aigles de la Médina	2025–26 Senegalese Women's Champions	3rd	Champions (2024)
(Sierra Leone) Mogbwemo Queens	2025–26 Sierra Leonean Women's Champions	2nd	Runners-up (2024)

== Group stage ==
=== Group A ===
Pos	Team	Pld	W	D	L	GF	GA	GD	Pts	Qualification
1	(Mali) USFAS Bamako	2	2	0	0	5	1	+4	6	Semi-finals
2	(Senegal) Aigles de la Médina	2	1	0	1	1	1	0	3	Semi-finals
3	(Liberia) Determine Girls	2	0	0	2	1	5	−4	0	

Source: WAFU Zone A
Rules for classification: Tiebreakers
25 August 2026
15:00

USFAS Bamako (Mali)	1–0	(Senegal) Aigles de la Médina
Oumou Koné 43' (pen.)

Independence Stadium, Bakau
Referee: Aïssatou Kanté (Guinea)

28 August 2026
16:00

Determine Girls (Liberia)	1–4	(Mali) USFAS Bamako
Damilola Adebayo 49'		Djamako Traoré 8', 10'; Korotoumou Keïta 22'; Safiatou Keïta 86'

Faraba Stadium, Faraba Banta
Referee: Félicité Kourouma (Guinea)

31 August 2026
16:00

Aigles de la Médina (Senegal)	1–0	(Liberia) Determine Girls
Aïssatou Fall 51' (pen.)

Jallow Memorial Stadium, Serekunda

=== Group B ===
Pos	Team	Pld	W	D	L	GF	GA	GD	Pts	Qualification
1	(Guinea) AS Bolonta	2	2	0	0	5	0	+5	6	Semi-finals
2	(The Gambia) Berewuleng FC (H)	2	1	0	1	5	3	+2	3	Semi-finals
3	(Sierra Leone) Mogbwemo Queens	2	0	0	2	1	8	−7	0	

Source: WAFU Zone A
Rules for classification: Tiebreakers
(H) Hosts
25 August 2026
18:00

Berewuleng FC (The Gambia)	0–2	(Guinea) AS Bolonta
		Mariama Soumah 48'; Maman Sata Fancinadouno 65'

Independence Stadium, Bakau

28 August 2026
16:00

Mogbwemo Queens (Sierra Leone)	1–5	(The Gambia) Berewuleng FC
Marguerite Ahouassou 79'		Sarah Jarju 15', 76' (pen.), 83', 90+5'; Ellen Gomez 87'

Jallow Memorial Stadium, Serekunda
Referee: Aida Sy (Senegal)

31 August 2026
16:00

AS Bolonta (Guinea)	3–0	(Sierra Leone) Mogbwemo Queens
Maman Sata Fancinadouno 23'; Kadidjatou Imorou 27'; Aïssatou Diallo 72'

Faraba Stadium, Faraba Banta

== Knockout stage ==
=== Bracket ===
Semi-finals
3 September – Bakau
(Mali) USFAS Bamako	3
(The Gambia) Berewuleng	2
3 September – Bakau
(Guinea) AS Bolonta	0
(Senegal) Aigles de la Médina	1

Final
6 September – Bakau
(Mali) USFAS Bamako	1
(Senegal) Aigles de la Médina	0

=== Semi-finals ===
3 September 2026
15:00

USFAS Bamako (Mali)	3–2	(The Gambia) Berewuleng
Oumou Koné 7', 15'; Aïssata Dembélé 45+1'		Ellen Gomez 3'; Marie Pereira 70'

Independence Stadium, Bakau

3 September 2026
18:00

AS Bolonta (Guinea)	0–1	(Senegal) Aigles de la Médina
		Sadigatou Diallo 5'

Independence Stadium, Bakau

=== Final ===
6 September 2026
17:00

USFAS Bamako (Mali)	1–0	(Senegal) Aigles de la Médina
Oumou Koné 79'

Independence Stadium, Bakau

== Top goalscorers ==
There were 25 goals scored in 9 matches, for an average of 2.78 goals per match (as of 6 September 2026).

Rank	Player	Team	Goals
1	(The Gambia) Sarah Jarju	(The Gambia) Berewuleng	4
1	(Mali) Oumou Koné	(Mali) USFAS Bamako	4
3	(Guinea) Maman Sata Fancinadouno	(Guinea) AS Bolonta	2
3	(Mali) Djamako Traoré	(Mali) USFAS Bamako	2
3	(The Gambia) Ellen Gomez	(The Gambia) Berewuleng FC	2
6	(Mali) Korotoumou Keïta	(Mali) USFAS Bamako	1
6	(Mali) Safiatou Keïta	(Mali) USFAS Bamako	1
6	(Mali) Aïssata Dembélé	(Mali) USFAS Bamako	1
6	(Senegal) Aïssatou Fall	(Senegal) Aigles de la Médina	1
6	(Senegal) Sadigatou Diallo	(Senegal) Aigles de la Médina	1
6	(Liberia) Damilola Adebayo	(Liberia) Determine Girls	1
6	(Guinea) Mariama Soumah	(Guinea) AS Bolonta	1
6	(Benin) Kadidjatou Imorou	(Guinea) AS Bolonta	1
6	(Guinea) Aïssatou Diallo	(Guinea) AS Bolonta	1
6	(Benin) Marguerite Ahouassou	(Sierra Leone) Mogbwemo Queens	1
