= CAF Women's Champions League WAFU Zone A =

WAFU A Women's Champions League
- Organiser(s): WAFU
- Founded: 2021; 5 years ago
- Region: West Africa
- Teams: 5
- Current champions: (Mali) USFAS Bamako (women) (2nd title)
- Most championships: (Mali) AS Mandé (women) (Mali) USFAS Bamako (women) (2 titles each)
- Broadcaster: CAF TV
- 2026 edition

The CAF Women's Champions League WAFU Zone A, is an annual qualification tournament for the CAF Women's Champions League organized by WAFU for its WAFU A member nations.

== History ==
In 2020, CAF announced the launch of the CAF Women's Champions League with each of the six sub confederations to hold qualifiers with the winners to represent them at the main tournament.

== Results ==
Season	Champions	Score	Runners-up	Ref.
2021	(Mali) AS Mande	2–1	(Senegal) AS Dakar	
2022	(Liberia) Determine Girls	Round-robin	(Mali) AS Mande	
2023	(Mali) AS Mande	1–1	(Senegal) AS Dakar	
2024	(Senegal) Aigles de la Médina	2–1	(Liberia) Determine Girls	
2025	(Mali) USFAS Bamako	Round-robin	(Senegal) Aigles de la Médina	
2026	(Mali) USFAS Bamako	1–0	(Senegal) Aigles de la Médina	

== Records and statistics ==
Tournament	Best Player	Golden Boot	Goals	Golden Glove	Fair Play	Ref
2021	(Mali) Fatoumata Diarra (footballer)	(Mali) Fatoumata Diarra (footballer)	5	(Mali) Aissatou Diallo	(Cape Verde) Seven Stars	
2022	(Guinea) Bountou Sylla			(Liberia) Jackie Touah		
2023	(Mali) Oumou Kone	(Mali) Oumou Kone	3			
2024	(Liberia) Jessica Quachie	(Guinea) Bountou Sylla	4	(Mali) Djaka Chérif Haidara	(Sierra Leone) Mogbwemo Queens Football Club	
2025		(The Gambia) Sarah Jarju	3			

=== Performance by nation ===
Nation	Winners	Runners-up	3rd Places	4th places	Winner	Runners-up	3rd Place	4th place
Mali	3	1	0	0	AS Mandé (2); USFAS Bamako (women) (1)	AS Mandé (1)		
Senegal	1	3	1	0	Aigles de la Médina (1)	AS Dakar (2); Aigles de la Médina (1)	USPA(1)	
Liberia	1	0	3		Determine Girls F.C. (1)		Determine Girls F.C. (3)	
Cape Verde	0	0	0	1				Seven Stars (1)
Sierra Leone	0	0	0	2				Mogbwemo Queens Football Club (1); Ram Kamara (1)
Gambia	0	0	1	1			Berewuleng F.C.	Red Scorpion Women Football Club(1)
