= 2024 CAF Women's Champions League WAFU Zone A Qualifiers =

Tournament details
- Host country: Sierra Leone
- City: Bo
- Dates: 1–11 August
- Teams: 5 (from 5 associations)
- Venue(s): 1 (in 1 host city)

Final positions
- Champions: (Senegal) Aigles de la Médina (1st title)
- Runners-up: (Liberia) Determine Girls
- Third place: (Sierra Leone) Mogbwemo Queens
- Fourth place: (Mali) AS Mandé

Tournament statistics
- Matches played: 10
- Goals scored: 22 (2.2 per match)
- Top scorer(s): (Guinea) Bountou Sylla (4 goals)
- All statistics correct as of 11 August 2024.

The 2024 CAF Women's Champions League WAFU Zone A Qualifiers is the 4th edition of CAF Women's Champions League WAFU Zone A Qualifiers tournament organized by the WAFU for the women's clubs of association nations. This edition will be held from 1 to 11 August 2024 in Sierra Leone. The winners of the tournament qualify for the 2024 CAF Women's Champions League final tournament.

== Participating teams ==
The following five teams contested in the qualifying tournament.

Team	Qualifying method	Appearances	Previous best performance
(Sierra Leone) Mogbwemo Queens	2023–24 Sierra Leonean Women's Champions	2nd	Fourth place (2023)
(Liberia) Determine Girls FC	2023–24 Liberian Women's Champions	4th	Champions (2022)
(Mali) AS Mandé	2023–24 Malian Women's Champions	4th	Champions (2021, 2023)
(Senegal) Aigles de la Médina	2023–24 Senegalese Women's Champions	1st	n/a
(The Gambia) Red Scorpion WFC	2023–24 GFF Women's League Division One Champions	1st	n/a

== Venues ==
Cities	Venues	Capacity
Bo	Bo Stadium	4,000

== Qualifying tournament ==
Tiebreakers

Teams are ranked according to points (3 points for a win, 1 point for a draw, 0 points for a loss), and if tied on points, the following tiebreaking criteria are applied, in the order given, to determine the rankings.

1. Points in head-to-head matches among tied teams;
2. Goal difference in head-to-head matches among tied teams;
3. Goals scored in head-to-head matches among tied teams;
4. If more than two teams are tied, and after applying all head-to-head criteria above, a subset of teams are still tied, all head-to-head criteria above are reapplied exclusively to this subset of teams;
5. Goal difference in all group matches;
6. Goals scored in all group matches;
7. Penalty shoot-out if only two teams are tied and they met in the last round of the group;
8. Disciplinary points (yellow card = 1 point, red card as a result of two yellow cards = 3 points, direct red card = 3 points, yellow card followed by direct red card = 4 points);
9. Drawing of lots.

Pos	Team	Pld	W	D	L	GF	GA	GD	Pts	Qualification	ADM	MOQ	DGF	RSC	ASM
1	(Senegal) Aigles de la Médina	4	2	1	1	6	5	+1	7	Main tournament			2–1	2–0	
2	(Sierra Leone) Mogbwemo Queens (H)	4	1	3	0	4	3	+1	6 (Note: Head-to-head points: Mogbwemo Queens 3, Determine Girls 0.)		2–2			0–0	0–0
3	(Liberia) Determine Girls	4	2	0	2	7	6	+1	6			1–2		2–1	3–1
4	(The Gambia) Red Scorpion	4	1	1	2	2	4	−2	4 (Note: Head-to-head points: Red Scorpion 3, AS Mandé 0.)						
5	(Mali) AS Mandé	4	1	1	2	3	4	−1	4		2–0			0–1	

Source: CAF
(H) Hosts
Notes:
1 August 2024
16:00

Mogbwemo Queens (Sierra Leone)	0–0	(Mali) AS Mandé
	Report

Bo Stadium, Bo
1 August 2024
19:00

Aigles de la Médina (Senegal)	2–0	(The Gambia) Red Scorpion WFC
Badé 44'; Kande 90+2'	Report

Bo Stadium, Bo

3 August 2024
16:00

Determine Girls FC (Liberia)	2–1	(The Gambia) Red Scorpion WFC
Darboe 28'; Sylla 35'	Report	Jatta 45+5'

Bo Stadium, Bo
3 August 2024
19:00

AS Mandé (Mali)	2–0	(Senegal) Aigles de la Médina
Diarra 63'; Oriata 90+5'	Report

Bo Stadium, Bo

5 August 2024
16:00

Mogbwemo Queens (Sierra Leone)	2–2	(Senegal) Aigles de la Médina
Sambu 8'; Kamara 72'	Report	Kande 42'; Kane 51'

Bo Stadium, Bo
5 August 2024
19:00

Determine Girls FC (Liberia)	3–1	(Mali) AS Mandé
Jatta 29', 68'; Sylla 40'	Report	Diarra 76'

Bo Stadium, Bo

8 August 2024
16:00

Determine Girls FC (Liberia)	1–2	(Sierra Leone) Mogbwemo Queens
Sylla 36'		Quadé 6'; Kamara 45'

Bo Stadium, Bo
8 August 2024
19:00

AS Mandé (Mali)	0–1	(The Gambia) Red Scorpion WFC
		Kuyateh 34'

Bo Stadium, Bo

11 August 2024
16:00

Aigles de la Médina (Senegal)	2–1	(Liberia) Determine Girls FC
Diokh 44'; Kane 90'	Report	Sylla 19'

Bo Stadium, Bo
11 August 2024
19:00

Mogbwemo Queens (Sierra Leone)	0–0	(The Gambia) Red Scorpion WFC

Bo Stadium, Bo

== Awards and statistics ==
=== Goalscorers ===
There have been 22 goals scored in 10 matches, for an average of 2.2 goals per match (as of 11 August 2024).

Rank	Player	Team	Goals
1	(Guinea) Bountou Sylla	(Liberia) Determine Girls FC	4
2	(Mali) Fatoumata Diarra	(Mali) AS Mandé	2
2	(The Gambia) Catherine Jatta	(Liberia) Determine Girls FC	2
2	(Senegal) Mbene Kané	(Senegal) Aigles de la Médina	2
5	(Senegal) Meta Kandé	(Senegal) Aigles de la Médina	1
5	(Senegal) Haby Badé	(Senegal) Aigles de la Médina	1
5	(Senegal) Marie Diokh	(Senegal) Aigles de la Médina	1
5	(The Gambia) Mbassey Darboe	(Liberia) Determine Girls FC	1
5	(Guinea-Bissau) Nadi Quadé	(Sierra Leone) Mogbwemo Queens	1
5	(Sierra Leone) Kadiatu Kamara	(Sierra Leone) Mogbwemo Queens	1
5	(The Gambia) Kaddijatou Jatta	(The Gambia) Red Scorpion WFC	1
5	(Mali) Yasso Oriata Konaté	(Mali) AS Mandé	1
5	(Sierra Leone) Rashida Kamara	(Sierra Leone) Mogbwemo Queens	1
5	(Guinea-Bissau) Mariama Sambu	(Sierra Leone) Mogbwemo Queens	1
5	(The Gambia) Kumba Kuyateh	(The Gambia) Red Scorpion WFC	1
