= 2025 CAF Women's Champions League WAFU Zone A Qualifiers =

Tournament details
- Host country: Senegal
- City: Dakar
- Dates: from 5 to 17 August
- Teams: 5 (from 5 associations)
- Venue: 1 (in 1 host city)

Final positions
- Champions: (Mali) USFAS Bamako (women)
- Runners-up: (Senegal) Aigles de la Médina
- Third place: (The Gambia) Berewuleng F.C.
- Fourth place: (Sierra Leone) Ram Kamara

Tournament statistics
- Matches played: 10
- Goals scored: 23 (2.3 per match)
- Top scorer: (Mali) Oumou Koné (3 goals)
- All statistics correct as of 19 August 2025.

The 2025 CAF Women's Champions League WAFU Zone A Qualifiers is the 5th edition of CAF Women's Champions League WAFU Zone A Qualifiers tournament organized by the WAFU for the women's clubs of association nations. This edition will be held in Dakar, Senegal from 5 to 17 August 2025. The winners of the tournament qualify for the 2025 CAF Women's Champions League final tournament.

== Participating teams ==
The following five teams contested in the qualifying tournament.

Team	Qualifying method	Appearances	Previous best performance
(Senegal) Aigles de la Médina	2024–25 Senegalese Women's Champions	2nd	Champions (2024)
(Mali) USFAS Bamako	2024–25 Malian Women's Champions	1st	n/a
(Liberia) Determine Girls FC	2024–25 Liberian Women's Champions	4th	Champions (2022)
(Sierra Leone) Ram Kamara	2024–25 Sierra Leonean Women's Champions	1st	n/a
(The Gambia) Berewuleng FC	2024–25 GFF Women's League Division One Champions	1st	n/a

== Venues ==
Cities	Venues	Capacity
Dakar	Diamniadio Olympic Stadium Annex	

== Match officials ==
The following referees were chosen for the tournament.

=== Referees ===
- (Guinea) Aissatou Kanté
- (The Gambia) Isatou Touray
- (Senegal) Fatoumata Sall Touré
- (Sierra Leone) Aminata Fullah

- (Mali) Alima Diarra
- (Mauritania) Yacine Samassa
- (Liberia) Love Wehyee

== Qualifying tournament ==
Tiebreakers

Teams are ranked according to points (3 points for a win, 1 point for a draw, 0 points for a loss), and if tied on points, the following tiebreaking criteria are applied, in the order given, to determine the rankings.

1. Points in head-to-head matches among tied teams;
2. Goal difference in head-to-head matches among tied teams;
3. Goals scored in head-to-head matches among tied teams;
4. If more than two teams are tied, and after applying all head-to-head criteria above, a subset of teams are still tied, all head-to-head criteria above are reapplied exclusively to this subset of teams;
5. Goal difference in all group matches;
6. Goals scored in all group matches;
7. Penalty shoot-out if only two teams are tied and they met in the last round of the group;
8. Disciplinary points (yellow card = 1 point, red card as a result of two yellow cards = 3 points, direct red card = 3 points, yellow card followed by direct red card = 4 points);
9. Drawing of lots.

Pos	Team	Pld	W	D	L	GF	GA	GD	Pts	Qualification
1	(Mali) USFAS Bamako	4	3	0	1	7	1	+6	9	Main tournament
2	(Senegal) Aigles de la Médina (H)	4	3	0	1	8	3	+5	9	
3	(The Gambia) Berewuleng FC	4	2	0	2	6	5	+1	6	
4	(Sierra Leone) Ram Kamara	4	1	1	2	1	6	−5	4	
5	(Liberia) Determine Girls	4	0	1	3	1	8	−7	1	

Source: CAF
(H) Hosts
5 August 2025
16:00

Aigles de la Médina (Senegal)	0–2	(Mali) USFAS Bamako
	Report	Koné 68'; Keïta 76'

Abdoulaye Wade Stadium Annex, Dakar
Referee: Aissatou Kanté (Guinea)
5 August 2025
19:00

Ram Kamara (Sierra Leone)	0–0	(Liberia) Determine Girls
	Report

Abdoulaye Wade Stadium Annex, Dakar
Referee: Isatou Touray (The Gambia)

8 August 2025
16:00

USFAS Bamako (Mali)	0–1	(Sierra Leone) Ram Kamara
	Report	Jumu 34'

Abdoulaye Wade Stadium Annex, Dakar
Referee: Fatoumata Sall Touré (Senegal)
8 August 2025
19:00

Berewuleng FC (The Gambia)	1–2	(Senegal) Aigles de la Médina
Cham 77'	Report	Casset 45+4'; Ba 57'

Abdoulaye Wade Stadium Annex, Dakar
Referee: Aminata Fullah (Sierra Leone)

11 August 2025
16:00

Ram Kamara (Sierra Leone)	0–1	(The Gambia) Berewuleng FC
	Report	Jarju 13'

Abdoulaye Wade Stadium Annex, Dakar
Referee: Alima Diarra (Mali)
11 August 2025
19:00

USFAS Bamako (Mali)	3–0	(Liberia) Determine Girls
Kamaté 45+7'; Koné 55' (pen.), 82'

Abdoulaye Wade Stadium Annex, Dakar
Referee: Yacine Samassa (Mauritania)

14 August 2025
16:00

Determine Girls (Liberia)	0–1	(Senegal) Aigles de la Médina
		Diallo 62'

Abdoulaye Wade Stadium Annex, Dakar
Referee: Aminata Fullah (Sierra Leone)
14 August 2025
19:00

Berewuleng FC (The Gambia)	0–2	(Mali) USFAS Bamako
		M. Traoré 81'; Keïta 90+1'

Abdoulaye Wade Stadium Annex, Dakar
Referee: Love Wehyee (Liberia)

17 August 2025
17:00

Determine Girls (Liberia)	1–4	(The Gambia) Berewuleng FC
Sanneh 27' (o.g.)		Jarju 1'; Sanneh 38', 41'; Darboe 85'

Abdoulaye Wade Stadium Annex 2, Dakar
17 August 2025
17:00

Aigles de la Médina (Senegal)	5–0	(Sierra Leone) Ram Kamara
Diabira 4', 84'; Dembele 67'; Fancinadouno 71'; Seck 77'

Abdoulaye Wade Stadium Annex 1, Dakar
Referee: Yacine Samassa (Mauritania)

== Awards and statistics ==
=== Goalscorers ===
There have been 13 goals scored in 8 matches, for an average of 1.62 goals per match (as of 14 August 2025).

Rank	Player	Team	Goals
1	(Mali) Oumou Koné	(Mali) USFAS Bamako	3
2	(Mali) Safiatou Keïta	(Mali) USFAS Bamako	2
3	(Mali) Djouma Kamaté	(Mali) USFAS Bamako	1
3	(The Gambia) Sarah Jarju	(The Gambia) Berewuleng FC	1
3	(Mali) Maimouna Traoré	(Mali) USFAS Bamako	1
3	(Senegal) Sadigatou Diallo	(Senegal) Aigles de la Médina	1
3	(Senegal) Ndèye Awa Casset	(Senegal) Aigles de la Médina	1
3	(Senegal) Aissatou Chris Ba	(Senegal) Aigles de la Médina	1
3	(The Gambia) Mariama Cham	(The Gambia) Berewuleng FC	1
