= 2023 CAF Women's Champions League WAFU Zone A Qualifiers =

Tournament details
- Host country: Liberia
- City: Paynesville
- Dates: 5–13 August
- Teams: 4 (from 4 associations)

Final positions
- Champions: (Mali) AS Mandé (2nd title)
- Runners-up: (Senegal) AS Dakar
- Third place: (Liberia) Determine Girls FC
- Fourth place: (Sierra Leone) Mogbwemo Queens

Tournament statistics
- Matches played: 6
- Goals scored: 11 (1.83 per match)
- Top scorer(s): (Mali) Oumou Kone (3 goals)
- All statistics correct as of 12 August 2023.

The 2023 CAF Women's Champions League WAFU Zone A Qualifiers was the 3rd edition of CAF Women's Champions League WAFU Zone A Qualifiers tournament organized by the WAFU for the women's clubs of association nations. This edition was held from 5 to 13 August 2023 in Paynesville, Liberia. The winners of the tournament qualified for the 2023 CAF Women's Champions League final tournament.

== Participating teams ==
The following four teams contested in the qualifying tournament.

Team	Qualifying method	Appearances	Previous best performance
(Liberia) Determine Girls FC	2022–23 Liberian Women's Champions	3rd	Champions 2022
(Mali) AS Mandé	2022–23 Malian Women's Champions	3rd	Champions 2021
(Senegal) AS Dakar	2022–23 Senegalese Women's Champions	1st	n/a
(Sierra Leone) Mogbwemo Queens	2022–23 Sierra Leonean Women's Champions	1st	n/a

== Venues ==
Cities	Venues	Capacity
Paynesville	Samuel Kanyon Doe Sports Complex	22,000

== Qualifying tournament ==
Tiebreakers

Teams are ranked according to points (3 points for a win, 1 point for a draw, 0 points for a loss), and if tied on points, the following tiebreaking criteria are applied, in the order given, to determine the rankings.

1. Points in head-to-head matches among tied teams;
2. Goal difference in head-to-head matches among tied teams;
3. Goals scored in head-to-head matches among tied teams;
4. If more than two teams are tied, and after applying all head-to-head criteria above, a subset of teams are still tied, all head-to-head criteria above are reapplied exclusively to this subset of teams;
5. Goal difference in all group matches;
6. Goals scored in all group matches;
7. Penalty shoot-out if only two teams are tied and they met in the last round of the group;
8. Disciplinary points (yellow card = 1 point, red card as a result of two yellow cards = 3 points, direct red card = 3 points, yellow card followed by direct red card = 4 points);
9. Drawing of lots.

Pos	Team	Pld	W	D	L	GF	GA	GD	Pts	Qualification	ASM	ASD	DGF	MQFC
1	(Mali) AS Mandé	3	1	2	0	4	1	+3	5	Main tournament	—			
2	(Senegal) AS Dakar	3	1	2	0	3	2	+1	5		1–1	—	1–1	1–0
3	(Liberia) Determine Girls FC	3	1	1	1	3	5	−2	4		0–3		—	2–1
4	(Sierra Leone) Mogbwemo Queens	3	0	1	2	1	3	−2	1		0–0			—

7 August 2023
16:00

Determine Girls FC (Liberia)	0–3	(Mali) AS Mandé
		Traoré 47'; Kone 60', 73'

Samuel Kanyon Doe Sports Complex, Monrovia
7 August 2023
19:00

AS Dakar (Senegal)	1–0	(Sierra Leone) Mogbwemo Queens
Mbodji 90'

Samuel Kanyon Doe Sports Complex, Monrovia

9 August 2023
16:00

Mogbwemo Queens (Sierra Leone)	0–0	(Mali) AS Mandé

Samuel Kanyon Doe Sports Complex, Monrovia
9 August 2023
19:00

AS Dakar (Senegal)	1–1	(Liberia) Determine Girls FC
K.Fall 76'		M. Camara 40'

Samuel Kanyon Doe Sports Complex, Monrovia

12 August 2023
16:00

Determine Girls FC (Liberia)	2–1	(Sierra Leone) Mogbwemo Queens
Tamba 33'; Camara 45+3'		Mohai ??'

Samuel Kanyon Doe Sports Complex, Monrovia
Referee: Aissata Diarra (Mali)
12 August 2023
19:00

AS Dakar (Senegal)	1–1	(Mali) AS Mandé
Fall 60'		Kone 51'

Samuel Kanyon Doe Sports Complex, Monrovia

== Awards and statistics ==
=== Goalscorers ===
There have been 11 goals scored in 6 matches, for an average of 1.83 goals per match (as of 12 August 2023).

Rank	Player	Team	Goals
1	(Mali) Oumou Kone	(Mali) AS Mandé	3
2	(Liberia) Mabinty Camara	(Liberia) Determine Girls FC	2
2	(Senegal) Korka Fall	(Senegal) AS Dakar	2
4	(Mali) Maimouna Traoré	(Mali) AS Mandé	1
4	(Senegal) Coumba Sylla Mbodji	(Senegal) AS Dakar	1
4	(Liberia) Elizabeth Tamba	(Liberia) Determine Girls FC	1
4	(Sierra Leone) Wuyah Sao Mohai	(Sierra Leone) Mogbwemo Queens	1
