= 2023 WAFU Zone A Women's Cup squads =

Football tournament squads

The 2023 WAFU Zone A Women's Cup is an international women's association football tournament held in Cape Verde from 20 January until 1 February 2023. The 8 national teams involved in the tournament were required to register a squad of at least 20 players, including two goalkeepers at minimum. Only players in these squads were eligible to take part in the tournament.

The age listed for each player is on 20 January 2023, the first day of the tournament. The number of caps and goals listed for each player do not include any matches played after the start of the tournament. The club listed is the club for which the player last played a competitive match prior to the tournament. A flag is included for coaches who are of a different nationality than their own national team.

== Teams ==
=== Cape Verde ===
Head coach: Silvéria Nédio

The final 23-player squad was announced on 17 January 2023.

As Cape Verde uses the Portuguese naming system the Portuguese nicknames of the players are in parentheses.

No.	Pos.	Player	Date of birth (age)	Caps	Goals	Club
1	GK	Jacinta Rodrigues (Jacinta)			0	(Cape Verdean Football Federation) Seven Stars
2	DF	Varsénia da Luz (Varsénia)	19 March 1992 (aged 30)	7	0	(Cape Verdean Football Federation) Seven Stars
4	DF	Leonora Dos Santos (Evy)		7	0	(Cape Verdean Football Federation) Jovens Unidos
6	MF	Maísa Cardoso (Grampola)	28 November 1996 (aged 26)		0	(Cape Verdean Football Federation) Jovens Unidos
7	FW	Ivânia Moreira (Vá)	13 May 1993 (aged 29)	7	0	(Cape Verdean Football Federation) Seven Stars
8	DF	Romina do Rosário (Romina)	14 December 1992 (aged 30)	5	0	(Cape Verdean Football Federation) Llana FC
9	MF	Kleydiana Borges (Diana)	5 October 1995 (aged 27)		0	(Portuguese Football Federation) Vitória SC
10	MF	Sasha Whannon (Sasha)	3 August 1997 (aged 25)		0	(Portuguese Football Federation) Amora SC
11	FW	Leonilde Rodrigues (Leo)	21 August 1998 (aged 24)		0	(Portuguese Football Federation) Atlético Ouriense
13	FW	Dara Centeio (Camoca)	9 October 1997 (aged 25)	3	0	(Cape Verdean Football Federation) Seven Stars
16	DF	Leidina Semedo (Leh)	28 November 1999 (aged 23)		0	(Cape Verdean Football Federation) ADEC
17	DF	Joseane Fernandes (Jô)		5	0	(Cape Verdean Football Federation) Seven Stars
18	MF	Alcione Gomes (Alcione)			0	(Cape Verdean Football Federation) Mindelense
19	MF	Jussara Silva Lizardo (Djuá)			0	(Cape Verdean Football Federation) Mindelense
20	FW	Aicha Lopes (Lopes)			0	(Cape Verdean Football Federation) Mindelense
21	FW	Letícia dos Santos (Tixa)			0	(Portuguese Football Federation) Sport Club Mirandela
22	DF	Zuleika Brito Sousa (Zuzu)			0	(Cape Verdean Football Federation) Mindelense
23	GK	Jéssica de Pina (Nádia)			0	(Cape Verdean Football Federation) Jovens Unidos
	DF	Lariza Rocha (Lariza)			0	(Cape Verdean Football Federation) Llana FC
	MF	Cristilene Neves (Cristy)	(aged 16)		0	(Cape Verdean Football Federation) Real Sociedad São Vicente
	MF	Ruth Duarte (Ruth)	31 August	4	0	(Cape Verdean Football Federation) Mindelense
	MF	Edna Monteiro (Edna)		3	0	(Cape Verdean Football Federation) Seven Stars
	FW	Jussara Furtado (Sara)			0	(Cape Verdean Football Federation) ADEC

=== Gambia ===
Head coach: Mariama Sowe

The final 20-player squad was announced on 17 January 2023.

No.	Pos.	Player	Date of birth (age)	Caps	Goals	Club
1	GK	Aminata Gaye	3 March 1996 (aged 26)			(Gambia Football Federation) Police FC
2	FW	Mbassey Darboe	20 May 1998 (aged 24)			(Liberia Football Association) Determine Girls
3	DF	Fatou Lowe				(Gambia Football Federation) Police FC
4	DF	Bintou Ceesay	18 February 2001 (aged 21)			(Gambia Football Federation) Police FC
5	DF	Wuday Colley				(Gambia Football Federation) Greater Tomorrow
6	MF	Kaddy Jatta				(Gambia Football Federation) Red Scorpions
7	FW	Fatoumatta Jammeh				(Gambia Football Federation) Red Scorpions
8	MF	Mamie Sylva	25 April 1992 (aged 30)			(Gambia Football Federation) Police FC
9	FW	Ola Buwaro	23 December 2001 (aged 21)			(Gambia Football Federation) Red Scorpions
10	FW	Catherine Jatta	21 November 2001 (aged 21)			(Gambia Football Federation) Police FC
11	DF	Fatou Fatty	26 May 2001 (aged 21)			(Gambia Football Federation) Red Scorpions
12	DF	Fatoumatta Mook				(Gambia Football Federation) Police FC
13	DF	Ruggy Joof (captain)	13 April 2001 (aged 21)			(Liberia Football Association) Determine Girls
16	FW	Kaddy Jarju				(Gambia Football Federation) Future Bi
18	GK	Matty Manga	5 March 2001 (aged 21)			(Gambia Football Federation) Abuko United
19	MF	Metta Sanneh	10 February 1993 (aged 29)			(Gambia Football Federation) Police FC
20	MF	Jabou Jobarteh	15 August 1993 (aged 29)			(Gambia Football Federation) Police FC
21	FW	Kumba Kuyateh	30 October 2002 (aged 20)			(Gambia Football Federation) Red Scorpions
22	GK	Mariama Ceesay	22 January 1998 (aged 24)			(Gambia Football Federation) Red Scorpions
	MF	Kadijatou Bayo				(Gambia Football Federation) Red Scorpions

=== Guinea ===
Head coach: Sékou Tidiane Kaba

The final 20-player squad was announced on 18 January 2023.

No.	Pos.	Player	Date of birth (age)	Caps	Goals	Club
1	GK	Aïssatou Diallo (captain)	31 December 1987 (aged 35)			(Sierra Leone Football Association) Ram Kamara
2	DF	Fatoumata Amara Sylla				(Royal Moroccan Football Federation) Olympique Club de Khouribga
3	DF	Damaye Camara				(Guinean Football Federation) INF
4	DF	Habibatou Coumbassa				(Guinean Football Federation) Foot Elite
5	DF	Mamaïssata Camara	11 May 2002 (aged 20)			(Guinean Football Federation) Horoya AC
6	MF	N’Nabinty Sylla	20 August 2003 (aged 19)			(Guinean Football Federation) INF
7	FW	Nathaly Cisse				(Guinean Football Federation) Club Olympique de Ratoma
9	FW	Mariam Barry	11 November 1997 (aged 25)			(Guinean Football Federation) AS Bolonta
8	MF	Odia Essomba				(Guinean Football Federation) AS Bolonta
10	MF	Mamet Camara				(Guinean Football Federation) Foot Elite
11	MF	Marie Camara				(Guinean Football Federation) Académie Titi
12	DF	Ivone Kolie				(Guinean Football Federation) KOLIE
13	DF	Oumou Hawa Balde				(Guinean Football Federation) AS Bolonta
	FW	Fanta Kante				(Royal Moroccan Football Federation) Boujema Aanejar
15	FW	Fanta Danda Camara				(Guinean Football Federation) Hafia FC
16	GK	Mahawa Traore				(Guinean Football Federation) Club Olympique de Ratoma
17	MF	Mariame Soumah				(Sierra Leone Football Association) Ram Kamara
18	MF	Mabinty Camara	5 February 1994 (aged 28)			(Liberia Football Association) Determine Girls
19	MF	Fatoumata Dédé Diallo				(Guinean Football Federation) Club Olympique de Ratoma
22	GK	Djaka Chérif Haïdara				(Guinean Football Federation) Jeunesse Technicienne de Kamsar

=== Guinea-Bissau ===
head coach: Romão dos Santos

No.	Pos.	Player	Date of birth (age)	Caps	Goals	Club
1	GK	Nandinha Almeida		2	0	(Football Federation of Guinea-Bissau)
2		Binta Anssumane Mane				(Football Federation of Guinea-Bissau)
4		Fatumata Zacarias Ba'				(Football Federation of Guinea-Bissau)
5	DF	Indira Agostinho Indi (captain)		2	0	(Football Federation of Guinea-Bissau)
6	DF	Pasfan Nhaga				(Football Federation of Guinea-Bissau)
7	FW	Nadi Quade		1	0	(Football Federation of Guinea-Bissau)
8	FW	Safiatu Baldé				(Football Federation of Guinea-Bissau)
9		Cátia José Cali				(Football Federation of Guinea-Bissau)
10	FW	Mariama Sambu				(Football Federation of Guinea-Bissau)
11	FW	Suraia Da Silva		0	0	(Football Federation of Guinea-Bissau)
12	GK	Sãozinha Mendes Pereira		1	0	(Football Federation of Guinea-Bissau)
13		Julia Mendes				(Football Federation of Guinea-Bissau)
14	DF	Itcha Cesário Gomes		2	0	(Football Federation of Guinea-Bissau)
15	DF	Nani Coli				(Football Federation of Guinea-Bissau)
16	MF	Ami Samba N'Dong		1	0	(Football Federation of Guinea-Bissau)
17		Teresa Luís Sambu				(Football Federation of Guinea-Bissau)
18	MF	Luisa Paulo Mendes		2	0	(Football Federation of Guinea-Bissau)
19		Julieta Iala				(Football Federation of Guinea-Bissau)
20		Cadidjatu Demba				(Football Federation of Guinea-Bissau)

=== Mauritania ===
Head coach: Abdoulaye Diallo

No.	Pos.	Player	Date of birth (age)	Caps	Goals	Club
1	GK	Salimata Samba			0	(Football Federation of the Islamic Republic of Mauritania) FC Camara
2	DF	Coumba Sy			0	(Football Federation of the Islamic Republic of Mauritania) FC Camara
3	DF	Coumba Gueye			0	(Football Federation of the Islamic Republic of Mauritania) FC Camara
4	DF	Funmilayo Adiara Adebisi			0	(Football Federation of the Islamic Republic of Mauritania) ASC Aizer
5	DF	Aichetou Boilil			0	(Football Federation of the Islamic Republic of Mauritania) FC Thierno
6	MF	Rougui Dia			0	(Football Federation of the Islamic Republic of Mauritania)
7	MF	Fatimata Anne			0	(Football Federation of the Islamic Republic of Mauritania) ASSA Zag
8	MF	Haby N'diaye			0	(Football Federation of the Islamic Republic of Mauritania) FC Camara
9	FW	Zeinebou Ahmed			0	(Football Federation of the Islamic Republic of Mauritania) FC Thierno
10	FW	Fatou Diop (captain)	5 May 1994 (aged 28)		1	(Royal Moroccan Football Federation) ASSA Zag
11	FW	Tacko Diabira			0	(Senegalese Football Federation) Dakkar Scaré-coeur
13	MF	Hawa Diallo			0	(Football Federation of the Islamic Republic of Mauritania) ASC Aizer
14	MF	El Alia Mohamed			0	(Football Federation of the Islamic Republic of Mauritania) FC Camara
15	MF	Leila Blal			0	(Football Federation of the Islamic Republic of Mauritania) FC Camara
16	GK	Ramatoulaye Diallo			0	(Football Federation of the Islamic Republic of Mauritania) ASC Aizer
17	MF	Ramata Gangui			0	(Football Federation of the Islamic Republic of Mauritania) FC Camara
18	FW	Aghlahoum M'Haimid			0	(Football Federation of the Islamic Republic of Mauritania) FC Camara
19	DF	Aida Ba			0	(Football Federation of the Islamic Republic of Mauritania) ASAC Concorde
	DF	Aida Diangne			0	(Football Federation of the Islamic Republic of Mauritania) ASAC Concorde
	GK	Djeinaba Dia			0	(Football Federation of the Islamic Republic of Mauritania) FC Camara
	DF	Adama Diallo			0	(Football Federation of the Islamic Republic of Mauritania) ASC Aizer
	MF	Hawa Mocter Vall			0	(Football Federation of the Islamic Republic of Mauritania) FC Thierno
	FW	Meije Cissé			0	(Football Federation of the Islamic Republic of Mauritania) FC Camara

=== Senegal ===
Head coach: Mame Moussa Cissé

The final 21-player squad was announced on 19 January 2023.

No.	Pos.	Player	Date of birth (age)	Caps	Goals	Club
	GK	Tening Séné	21 January 1990 (age 36)	0	0	(Senegalese Football Federation) Grand Yoff de Dakar
	GK	Adji Ndiaye	4 August 2006 (age 20)	0	0	(Senegalese Football Federation)
2	DF	Marième Babou	13 April 2003 (age 23)			(Senegalese Football Federation) US Dakar
3	DF	Anta Dembele	15 June 1994 (age 32)	5	0	(Senegalese Football Federation) US Dakar
26	DF	Astou Sy	11 December 1986 (age 39)			(Senegalese Football Federation) Dakar Sacré Cœur
5	DF	Ndeye Ndiaye Kané	2 January 1997 (age 29)	2	0	(Senegalese Football Federation) Grand Yoff de Dakar
	DF	Mame fatma Diagne				(Senegalese Football Federation) AFA Dakar
	DF	Aminata Ba		0	0	(Senegalese Football Federation) Aigles Dakar
	DF	Aminata Kanté		0	0	(Senegalese Football Federation) Aigles Dakar
14	DF	Salimata Ndiaye	17 February 1995 (age 31)	5	0	(Senegalese Football Federation) St-Louis
6	MF	Edmée Diagne	1 May 1998 (age 28)	4	0	(Senegalese Football Federation) St-Louis
	MF	Wolimata Ndiaye				(Senegalese Football Federation) Dorades de Mbour
13	MF	Jeannette Sagna	4 August 1999 (age 27)	5	0	(Senegalese Football Federation) Dakar Sacré Cœur
15	MF	Jeanne Niang	5 February 1998 (age 28)	2	0	(Senegalese Football Federation) Aigles Dakar
19	MF	Bineta Korkel Seck	11 January 1998 (age 28)	0	0	(Senegalese Football Federation) Dakar Sacré Cœur
22	MF	Gladys Irène Dacosta	21 September 1995 (age 30)	1	0	(Senegalese Football Federation) US Dakar
9	FW	Nguenar Ndiaye	10 January 1995 (age 31)	4	7	(French Football Federation) Bourges
9	FW	Haby Balde		4	7	(Senegalese Football Federation)
17	FW	Hapsatou Malado Diallo	14 April 2005 (age 21)	1	0	(Senegalese Football Federation) US Dakar
20	FW	Korka Fall	19 February 1990 (age 36)	4	0	(Senegalese Football Federation) Aigles Dakaro
24	FW	Coumba Sylla Mbodji	26 August 2003 (age 22)			(Senegalese Football Federation) Dorades de Mbour

=== Sierra Leone ===
Head coach: Ernest Hallowell

The final 20-player squad was announced on 16 January 2023.

No.	Pos.	Player	Date of birth (age)	Caps	Goals	Club
1	GK	Cecilia Bangura				(Sierra Leone Football Association) Mena Queens
2	DF	Aminata Bellon				(Sierra Leone Football Association) Mena Queens
3	DF	Mamusu Tamu				(Sierra Leone Football Association) FC Kallon
4	DF	Marie Kamara				(Sierra Leone Football Association) Ram Kamara FC
5	DF	Alice Koroma				(Sierra Leone Football Association) FC Kallon
6	MF	Jeneba Koroma (captain)				(Sierra Leone Football Association) Mogbewmo Queens
7	MF	Adama Kargbo				(Sierra Leone Football Association) FC Kallon
8	MF	Memunatu Kamara				(Sierra Leone Football Association) Correctional Center FC
9	FW	Kumba Z. Brima				(Sierra Leone Football Association) Kahunla Queens
10	MF	Sarah Bangura				(Sierra Leone Football Association) FC Kallon
11	MF	Matilda Kabba				(Sierra Leone Football Association) Kahunla Queens
12	MF	Kadiatu Kanu				(Sierra Leone Football Association) Ram Kamara FC
13	MF	Kadiatu M. Kamara				(Sierra Leone Football Association) Kahunla Queens
14	FW	Wuyah S. Mohai				(Sierra Leone Football Association) Mogbewmo Queens
16	GK	Isha Kamara				(Sierra Leone Football Association) FC Kallon
18	DF	Isha Sesay				(Sierra Leone Football Association) Ram Kamara FC
19	MF	Kadiatu A. Kamara				(Sierra Leone Football Association) Kahunla Queens
23	GK	Hannah Juana				(Sierra Leone Football Association) Mogbewmo Queens
	DF	Mabel Bongay				(Sierra Leone Football Association) Mogbewmo Queens
	MF	Sarah Sesay				(Sierra Leone Football Association) Kahunla Queens
	MF	Kadiatu M. Jalloh				(Sierra Leone Football Association) Mogbewmo Queens
