= Mbenga =

Mbenga may refer to:

- Hydrocynus goliath (Goliath Tigerfish), an African predatory freshwater fish
- Phialucium mbenga, a species of cnidarian
- Mbenga people, western Pygmies

== People with the surname ==
- Choro Mbenga, Gambian association footballer and manager
- D. J. Mbenga, a Belgian professional basketball player
- Urbain Mbenga, leader in the Community of Christ

== Fictional ==
Dr. Joseph M'Benga, a Star Trek character
