= Salamatu Kamara (footballer) =

Sierra Leonean footballer (born 1999)

Personal information
- Full name: Salamatu Jariatu Kamara
- Date of birth: 6 July 1999 (age 27)
- Place of birth: Sierra Leone
- Position: Midfielder

Team information
- Current team: Ram Kamara FC
- Number: 23

Senior career*
Years	Team	Apps	(Gls)
2022–2021	İlkadım Belediyesi	40	(9)
2023–2023	Ataşehir Belediyespor	4	(0)
2023–2024	Mogbwemo Queens		
2024–	Ram Kamara FC	12	(20)

International career
	Sierra Leone	7	(2)
- * Club domestic league appearances and goals

Salamatu Jariatu Kamara (born 6 July 1999), nicknamed Stargazz, is a Sierra Leonean footballer who plays as a defensive midfielder for Kamara FC in the Sierra Leone Women's Premier League and the Sierra Leone national team, whom she captains.

== Career ==
In Sierra Leone, Kamara played for Soccer Queens, Subah United in Makeni, and Mogbwemo Queens, with whom she won the national league title, scoring 13 goals and providing several assists. She also spent two seasons in Turkey, representing Samsun Yabancılar Pazarı S.K. and Ataşehir Belediyespor.

On the international stage, Kamara represents the Sierra Queens and most recently captained the team during the 2025 WAFU Zone A Women's Cup. She played a decisive role in securing the team's first major title, scoring the lone goal in both the semi-final and final, and was named Player of the Match in the final.
