= Liberian FA Women's Cup =

LFA Women's Cup
- Founded: 2002
- Region: Liberia
- Current champions: Earth Angels (10th title)
- Most championships: Earth Angels (10 titles)
- 2021 LFA W-Cup

The Liberian FA Women's Cup called LFA Women's Cup is a women's association football competition in Liberia. pitting regional teams against each other. It was established in 2002. It is the women's equivalent of the Liberian FA Cup for men.

== Finals ==
Year	Winners	Score	Runners-up	Venue
2002	Earth Angels	–	Professional Sisters FC	
2003		–		
2004	Tito United	1–0	Earth Angels	Antoinette Tubman Stadium, Monrovia
2005		–		
2006	Earth Angels	3–0	Kortie IE	Antoinette Tubman Stadium, Monrovia
2007		–		
2008	Earth Angels	1–0	Blanco FC	
2009	Professional Anchors	–	Earth Angels	
2010	Earth Angels	–		
2011	Earth Angels	2–1	Professional Anchors	
2012		–		
2013	Earth Angels	1–1 (a.e.t.) (5–4 p)	Senior Pros FC	
2014	Blanco FC	3–2 (a.e.t.)	Earth Angels	
2015		–		
2016	Earth Angels	5–0	Determined Girls FC	
2017		–		
2018	Earth Angels	4–2	Blanco FC	
2019	Earth Angels	5–0	Blanco FC	Doris Williams Stadium, Buchanan
2020	abandoned because of the COVID-19 pandemic in Liberia			
2021	Earth Angels	1–0 (a.e.t.)	Senior Pros FC	

== See also ==
- Liberian Women's First Division
- Liberian Women's Super Cup
