= Kaddy Jarju =

Gambian footballer (born 2004)

Personal information
- Date of birth: 2 January 2004 (age 22)
- Place of birth: Brikama, Gambia
- Position: Forward

Team information
- Current team: Shaita Angels
- Number: 9

Senior career*
Years	Team	Apps	(Gls)
–2023	(The Gambia) Future Bi		(85)
2023–2024	(Ghana) Lady Strikers	15	(5)
2024–	(Liberia) Shaita Angels		

International career^{‡}
2021–2024	Gambia U20		
2023–	Gambia	8	(2)
- * Club domestic league appearances and goals ‡ National team caps and goals as of 22 May 2025

Kaddy Jarju (born 2 January 2004) is a Gambian footballer who plays as a forward for Shaita Angels in the Liberian Women's First Division and the Gambia national team.

== Club career ==
In Gambia, Jarju played for Future Bi Football Club in the second division, where she was the league's top scorer for three consecutive seasons. In July 2021, she was named Player of the Month, having scored 12 goals in just four matches.

In April 2023, the Queen Scorpions forward signed a three-year deal with Ghana Cape Coast-based Lady Strikers. Following a single season with the club, she made the move to Liberia, where she signed a three-year contract with Shaita Angels.

== International career ==
Jarju began her international career with Gambia's under-20 national team, taking part in the 2022 African U-20 Women's World Cup qualification matches against Burkina Faso. In January 2023, she received her first call-up to the senior national team for the 2023 WAFU Zone A Women's Cup. She made her debut on 21 January 2023 against Sierra Leone, coming on as a substitute in the 48th minute. On 29 January 2023, she scored her first international goal in the third-place match against Guinea-Bissau, helping Gambia secure the bronze medal.

=== International goals ===
Scores and results list the Gambia's goal tally first, score column indicates score after each Jarju goal.

No.	Date	Venue	Opponent	Score	Result	Competition
1	29 January 2023	Estádio Marcelo Leitão, Espargos, Cape Verde	Guinea-Bissau	3–1	3–2	2023 WAFU Zone A Women's Cup
2	22 May 2025	Stadium of Ksar, Nouakchott, Mauritania	Sierra Leone	3–0	3–0	2025 WAFU Zone A Women's Cup
