= Malian Women's Cup =

- Founded: 2011
- Region: Mali
- Current champions: Super Lionnes d'Hamdallaye (1st title)
- Most championships: AS Mandé (4 titles)
- 2021 W-Cup

The Malian Women's Cup is a women's association football competition in Mali. pitting regional teams against each other. It was established in 2011. The winner of the 2021 edition is Super Lionnes d'Hamdallaye for the first time.

== History ==
The first cup competition in Mali was the FMF President's Cup and was held from 1997 to 2004. The second competition was the Moneygram Cup and was held from 2007 to 2009.

On 2011, the Malian Football Federation launched the Malian national women's Cup.

== Finals ==
Year	Winners	Score	Runners-up	Venue
2011	US FAS	1–0	Super Lionnes	
2012	AS Mandé	3–1	AS Real Bamako	
2013	not held			
2014	AS Mandé	6–2	AS Real Bamako	
2015	AS Mandé	1–0	US FAS	
2016	AS Mandé	3–0	US FAS	Stade Modibo Kéïta, Bamako
2017	AS Mandé	postponed	Super Lionnes	
2018	not held			
2019	not held			
2020	cancelled because of the COVID-19 pandemic in Mali			
2021	Super Lionnes	3–1	AS Mandé	Stade Modibo Kéïta, Bamako
2022	AS Mandé	1-0	Super Lionnes	Stade 26 Mars, Bamako
2023	Amazones	2–1	AS Mandé	Stade 26 Mars, Bamako

== Most successful clubs ==
Club	Winners	Runners-up	Winning Cups	Runners-up
AS Mandé	4	1	2012, 2014, 2015, 2016	2021
US FAS	1	2	2011	2015, 2016
Super Lionnes	1	1	2021	2011
AS Real Bamako	0	2		2012, 2014

== See also ==
- Malian Women's Championship
