= Senegalese Women's Cup =

- Founded: 1994
- Region: Senegal
- Current champions: Aigles de la Médina (4th title)
- Most championships: Jappo Olympique de Guediawaye (6 titles)
- 2024 W-Cup

The Senegalese Women's Cup is a women's association football competition in Senegal. pitting regional teams against each other. It was established in 2003. It is the women's equivalent of the Senegal FA Cup for men.

== Finals ==
Year	Winners	Score	Runners-up	Venue
1994	Tigresses de Thiès	–		
1995–2002	not held			
2003	Sirènes de Grand Yoff	7–0	Casa Sports	Stade Léopold Sédar Senghor, Dakar
2004	Sirènes de Grand Yoff	9–0	Amazones de Kolda	Stade Léopold Sédar Senghor, Dakar
2005	Aigles de la Médina	5–2	Sirènes de Grand Yoff	Stade Léopold Sédar Senghor, Dakar
2006	Aigles de la Médina	4–0	Sirènes de Grand Yoff	Dakar
2007	not held			
2008	not held			
2009	Aigles de la Médina	2–0	Sirènes de Grand Yoff	
2010	Sirènes de Grand Yoff	3–1	Amazones de Yeumbeul	Stade Demba Diop, Dakar
2011	ASC Médiour de Rufisque	2–0	Amazones de Grand Yoff	
2012	ASC Médiour de Rufisque	3–1	Dorades de Mbour	Stade Demba Diop, Dakar
2013	Tigresses de Thiès	1–1 (a.e.t.), (3–2 p)	ASC Médiour de Rufisque	Stade Demba Diop, Dakar
2014	Tigresses de Thiès	2–0	Amazones de Grand Yoff	Dakar
2015	Sirènes de Grand Yoff	4–0	Amazones de Grand Yoff	
2016	Sirènes de Grand Yoff	1–0	Lycée Ameth Fall	
2017	ASC Médiour de Rufisque	4–0	Kaolack FC	Stade Al Djigo, Pikine
2018	ASC Médiour de Rufisque	3–0	Sirènes de Grand Yoff	
2019	Amazones de Grand Yoff	3–0	US Parcelles Assainies	Stade Al Djigo, Pikine
2020	cancelled because of the COVID-19 pandemic in Senegal			
2021	not played			
2022	US Parcelles Assainies	2–0	AS Dakar Sacré-Cœur	
2023	Sirènes de Grand Yoff	2–0	AFA Grand Yoff	
2024	Aigles de la Médina	2–0	Jappo Olympique de Guediawaye	Stade Diaguily Bakayoko, Grand Yoff

Jappo Olympique de Guediawaye (ex. Sirènes de Grand Yoff).

== Most successful clubs ==
Club	Winners	Runners-up	Winning Cups	Runners-up
Jappo Olympique de Guediawaye	6	5	2003, 2004, 2010, 2015, 2016, 2023	2005, 2006, 2009, 2018, 2024
Aigles de la Médina	4	1	2005, 2006, 2009, 2024	2021
ASC Médiour de Rufisque	4	1	2011, 2012, 2017, 2018	2013
Tigresses de Thiès	3	0	1994, 2013, 2014	
AS Dakar Sacré-Cœur	2	1	2021, 2023	2022
Amazones de Grand Yoff	1	3	2019	2011, 2014, 2015
US Parcelles Assainies	1	1	2022	2019
Casa Sports	0	1		2003
Amazones de Kolda	0	1		2004
Amazones de Yeumbeul	0	1		2010
Dorades de Mbour	0	1		2012
Lycée Ameth Fall	0	1		2016
Kaolack FC	0	1		2017
AFA Grand Yoff	0	1		2023

== See also ==
- Senegalese Women's Championship
