= Urbain Mbenga =

Urbain Mbenga Mpiem Ley is a leader in the Community of Christ. He is the president of the church's First Quorum of the Seventy.

== Biography ==
Mbenga was born in Mamou, Guinea. He emigrated to the Democratic Republic of the Congo (DRC) and was educated at a school in Kananga and at universities in Kinshasa. Mbenga went on to teach high school in Beno and was a high school principal in Kinshasa. He later became the head of the geography department at the Université Pédagogique Nationale in the DRC.

As president of the First Quorum of the Seventy, Mbenga oversees the Community of Christ's Africa and Haiti Mission Field.
