= Choro Mbenga =

Gambian football player and manager

Personal information
- Place of birth: Gambia
- Position: Goalkeeper

Managerial career
- Years: Team
- Red Scorpion Women Football Club
- Gambia U-17 (assistant coach)
- Gambia (assistant coach)

Choro Mbenga is a Gambian football coach and former player.

== Personal life ==
Choro Mbenga's brother Des Samba was head of women's football for the Gambia Football Association for two non-consecutive terms.

== Career ==
Mbenga played for Red Scorpions as a goalkeeper. In 2011, Mbenga hosted a Confederation of African Football women's football coaching course in Addis Ababa, Ethiopia. From 2014–15, she was the Gambia Football Federation's women's football co-ordinator. Whilst in the role, she organised Gambia's first women's football festival, for girls aged between 6 and 12 in Yundum.

Mbenga has worked as coach of Red Scorpions, and as an assistant coach of the Gambia women's national football team, and the Gambia women's national under-17 football team. She is the only Gambian woman with a FIFA B grade licence. She led the Red Scorpians to second place in the 2009 Division One League Championship. In 2016, Mbenga and her assistant Dodou Faye were suspended for attacking a referee. She was a coach of Gambian and Red Scorpians footballer Fatim Jawara, who died in 2016 after trying to cross the Mediterranean Sea. Mbenga also guided Red Scorpions to the 2019 Division One League Championship.
