= Tacko Diabira =

Mauritanian footballer (born 1999)

Personal information
- Date of birth: 28 April 1999 (age 27)
- Position: Forward

Team information
- Current team: Aigles de la Médina

Senior career*
Years	Team	Apps	(Gls)
2021–2025	AS Dakar Sacré-Cœur	49	(36)
2025	Aigles de la Médina	7	(12)

International career^{‡}
2019–	Mauritania	13	(4)
- * Club domestic league appearances and goals ‡ National team caps and goals as of 16 April 2026

Tacko Diabira (Arabic: تاكو ديابيرا; born 28 April 1999) is a Mauritanian professional footballer who plays as a forward for Senegalese Aigles de la Médina and the Mauritania women's national team. of which she is jointly the top scorer.

== Club career ==
Due to the virtually non-existent state of women's football in Mauritania, largely because of religious and cultural factors, Diabira moved to Senegal, where some of her family lives, and joined AS Dakar Sacré-Cœur in the women's championship to pursue better opportunities for her football career. During the 2023–24 season, she emerged as the league's top scorer, netting 16 goals in 19 appearances.

== International career ==
Diabira has represented Mauritania internationally since the inception of the women's national team in 2019, receiving her first call-up for the team's historic debut match against Djibouti. Where she made her international debut in a 1–3 loss to les Gazelles. In August of that same year, she took part in the 2019 COTIF Women's Football Tournament in Alcúdia, Spain, where she scored Mauritania's only goal of the competition in a match against the Villarreal CF under-19 team. Diabira became a regular fixture for Les Mourabitounes, earning a place in the squad for all of Mauritania's international regional tournaments, including the UNAF Tunisia 2020, the WAFU A Cape Verde 2023, and the WAFU A Mauritania 2025. In the latter, she made history by scoring Mauritania's first-ever goal in a competitive regional tournament, equalizing against Liberia to earn the team their first-ever point.

=== International goals ===
Scores and results list Mauritania's goal tally first, score column indicates score after each Diabira goal.

No.	Date	Venue	Opponent	Score	Result	Competition
1	24 May 2025	Cheikha Ould Boïdiya Stadium, Nouakchott, Mauritania	Liberia	1–1	1–1	2025 WAFU Zone A Women's Cup
2	16 April 2026	Alassane Ouattara Stadium, Abidjan, Ivory Coast	Turks and Caicos Islands	1–0	6–0	2026 FIFA Series
3	16 April 2026	Alassane Ouattara Stadium, Abidjan, Ivory Coast	Turks and Caicos Islands	3–0	6–0	2026 FIFA Series
3	16 April 2026	Alassane Ouattara Stadium, Abidjan, Ivory Coast	Turks and Caicos Islands	5–0	6–0	2026 FIFA Series
