= Shaita Angels Football Club =

Football team in Liberia

- Full name: Shaita Angels Football Club
- Nickname: The Angels
- Founded: 2019; 7 years ago
- Stadium: George Weah Technical Center
- Owner: Benita Urey
- Coach: Monroe Winn
- League: LFA Women's Upper League
- 2023–24: LFA Women's Upper League (Runners-Up)

Shaita Angels Football Club is a Liberian professional women's football club based in Careysburg, Liberia. The club was founded in 2019 with a group of kickball players. The club has won the Liberian women's lower league, the Liberian FA Cup and the Liberian Super Cup.

== History ==
=== Establishment ===
Shaita Angels Football Club was formed in 2019 following the turf installation at the George Weah Technical Center in Careysburg, Liberia. Shaita Angels' first season in Liberian women's football was the 2019-20 season which was ruined by the COVID-19. The club gained promotion to the Liberian women's top flight at the end of the 2020-21 season after finishing second in the women's lower league.

The 2021-22 season was the club's first season in the women's top flight. After a month in the top flight, the club appointed Benita Urey as its vice president. Things did not go on as expected after the club got relegated at the end of the season. The club returned to the lower league after just one season in the top fight.

=== Return to the Top Flight and achievements ===
Relegation to the women's second league did not slow down the progress of the club as they went on to win the first major trophy in the club's history. Shaita Angels finished top of the table and was crowned champion at the end of the 2022-23 season. While playing in the lower league, the club reached the final of the 2022-23 Liberian FA Cup and was defeated by Determine Girls F.C. The season ended with the club winning the women's lower league, getting promotion to the top flight, and playing in its first-ever cup final. Shaita Angels' returned to the top tier stronger than their debut season as they went on to finish second in the 2023-24 league. The 2023-24 season was capped off with a Liberian FA Cup triumph. Shaita Angels beat World Girls in the final to win its first-ever cup title. The club's success continued the following season by winning the 2025 Liberian Super Cup. They then went on to win the 2025/26 Orange Cup against World Girls. They went on to win the Liberian Super Cup in 2026 after their opponents failed to show up for the match.

== Players ==
=== Current squad ===
As of 12 January 2025

Note: Flags indicate national team as defined under FIFA eligibility rules; some limited exceptions apply. Players may hold more than one non-FIFA nationality.

| No. | Pos. | Nation | Player |
|---|---|---|---|
| 1 | GK | LBR | Asata Dulleh |
| 27 | GK | LBR | Albertha Pratt |
| 30 | GK | LBR | Blessing King |
| 4 | DF | LBR | Francisca Howe (C) |
| 5 | DF | LBR | Esther Massalay |
| 6 | DF | GHA | Comfort Frimpong |
| 13 | DF | LBR | Blessing Kerkulah |
| 20 | DF | NGR | Ganiyat Adeleke |
| 29 | DF | GAM | Haddy Wally |
| 8 | MF | GAM | Kumba Kuyateh |
| 12 | MF | LBR | Sylvia Pyne |
| 14 | MF | LBR | Malusu Blama |

| No. | Pos. | Nation | Player |
|---|---|---|---|
| 16 | MF | GHA | Deborah Nyankoh |
| 23 | MF | CIV | Marie Pascale |
| 9 | FW | GHA | Sarah Abrafi |
| 2 | FW | LBR | Rebecca Tarr |
| 7 | FW | LBR | Celestina Boye |
| 11 | FW | GAM | Kaddy Jarju |
| 10 | FW | LBR | Lucy Kikeh |
| 15 | FW | GAM | Salimatta Saidykhan |
| 21 | DF | LBR | Aline Capehart |
| 22 | FW | LBR | Miatta Morris |
| 17 | DF | LBR | Oretha Tokpah |

== Current technical staff ==
| Position | Staff |
|---|---|
| Head Coach | Robert Lartey |
| Deputy Coach | Alhaji Konneh |
| Assistant Coach | Eltonia Prowd |
| Goalkeeping Coach | Chris Wesseh |
| Physical Trainer | Romeo Logan |
| Team Medic | Namesay Kollie |
| Team Manager | Prince Zoe |
| Kit Manager | Fatu Blama |

== Administrators ==
| Position | Staff |
|---|---|
| CEO & President | Benita Whitney Urey |
| Vice President for Players Affairs | Komassa Sumo |
| Vice President for Administration | Ricky Teah |

== Honours ==
=== National ===
Liberian FA Cup

- Winner (1): 2023-24
- Winner (2): 2025-26

Liberian Super Cup

- Winner (1): 2024-25
- Winner (2): 2026-27

Liberia Women's Lower League

- Winner (1): 2022-23
