= Guinea Women's League 1 =

Highest division of league competition for Guinea women's football

- Founded: 2007; 19 years ago
- Country: Guinea
- Confederation: CAF
- Number of clubs: 12
- Level on pyramid: 1
- International cup: CAF Champions League
- Current champions: Horoya AC (1st title) (2022–23)
- Most championships: JT Kamsar (3 titles)

The Guinea Women's League 1 is the top level women's association football league in Guinea.

== History ==
In 2020, the Federation relaunched the competition with the creation of the Guinean League of Female Football (LGFF). The championship is organized in two cities, Kankan and Labé and begins in March 2021. The tournament is on hiatus for more than a year between April 2021 and May 2022 but is finally completed and crowns the Horoya AC, which wins in the final on penalties against Hafia FC.

== Champions ==
The list of champions and runners-up:

Palmarès par saison
Saison	Champion	Runner-up
2007	AS Bolonta	Planète
2008	Unknown result	
2009	AS Bolonta	Mercato
2012	JT Kamsar	AS Bolonta
2013	JT Kamsar	
2014	JT Kamsar	Kébou SC
2016	Lalaba FC	JT Kamsar
2019	Horoya AC	CI Kamsar
2021-2022	Horoya AC	Hafia FC
2022-2023		
2023-2024		
2024-2025		
2025-2026	AS Bolonta	

== Most successful clubs ==
Rank	Club	Champions	Runners-up	Winning seasons	Runners-up seasons
1	JT Kamsar	3	2	2012,2013,2014	2016
2	AS Bolonta	2	1	2007, 2009	2012,2019
3	Horoya AC	2	0	2019,2022	
4	JT Kamsar	1	0	2014	
5	Planète	0	1		2007
5	Mercato	0	1		2009
5	Kébou SC	0	1		2014
