= Catherine Jatta =

Gambian footballer (born 2001)

Personal information
- Date of birth: 21 November 2001 (age 24)
- Place of birth: Gambia
- Position: Forward

Team information
- Current team: Determine Girls
- Number: 25

Senior career*
Years	Team	Apps	(Gls)
2019–2023	Gambia Police Force		
2023–	Determine Girls		(19)

International career^{‡}
2018	Gambia U17	3	(1)
2020	Gambia U20	2	(1)
2021–	Gambia	11	(9)
- * Club domestic league appearances and goals ‡ National team caps and goals as of 18 February 2025

Catherine Jatta (born 21 November 2001) is a Gambian footballer who plays as a forward for Liberian Women's First Division club Determine Girls and the Gambian national team.

== Early life ==
Jatta began playing football at an early age while in nursery school, regularly playing with her brothers and other boys in the neighborhood.

== Club career ==
In July 2023, Liberian Determine Girls signed Jatta on loan from Gambian side Police FC. She made headlines shortly after joining, scoring consistently. By the 7th round, she had already netted 10 goals, making her the league's second-highest scorer. She eventually helped the club win the league, finishing the season with 19 goals.

== International career ==
Jatta advanced through Gambia's youth national teams, representing the U-17 and U-20 sides in the 2018 and 2020 World Cup qualifiers, respectively, and scoring in both campaigns.

In October 2021, she received her first call-up to the senior team for the 2022 Women's Africa Cup of Nations qualification matches against Sierra Leone. On 18 October 2021, she made her senior debut as a starter in a 2–0 victory against Sierra Leone. On February 23, 2022, she scored her first international goal in a 2–1 defeat to Cameroon in the second round.

In January 2023, she was named to Gambia's squad for the 2023 WAFU Zone A Women's Cup, emerging as the team's standout performer. She scored in every match, including a mega hat-trick against Sierra Leone and the winning goal against Guinea, helping Gambia secure the bronze medal.

== Career statistics ==
=== International ===
Appearances and goals by national team and year
National team	Year	Apps	Goals
Gambia	2021	2	0
Gambia	2022	2	2
Gambia	2023	7	7
Gambia	2024	0	0
Gambia	2025	0	0
Total		11	9

Scores and results list The Gambia's goal tally first, score column indicates score after each Jatta goal.

List of international goals scored by Catherine Jatta
No.	Date	Venue	Opponent	Score	Result	Competition
1	23 February 2022	Independence Stadium, Bakau, Gambia	Cameroon	1–2	1–2	2022 WAFCON qualification
2	7 April 2022	Prince Moulay Abdellah Stadium, Rabat, Morocco	Morocco	1–5	1–6	Friendly
3	21 January 2023	Estádio Marcelo Leitão, Espargos, Cape Verde	Sierra Leone	1–0	4–0	2023 WAFU Zone A Women's Cup
4	21 January 2023	Estádio Marcelo Leitão, Espargos, Cape Verde	Sierra Leone	2–0	4–0	2023 WAFU Zone A Women's Cup
5	21 January 2023	Estádio Marcelo Leitão, Espargos, Cape Verde	Sierra Leone	3–0	4–0	2023 WAFU Zone A Women's Cup
6	21 January 2023	Estádio Marcelo Leitão, Espargos, Cape Verde	Sierra Leone	4–0	4–0	2023 WAFU Zone A Women's Cup
7	23 January 2023	Estádio Marcelo Leitão, Espargos, Cape Verde	Senegal	1–1	1–4	2023 WAFU Zone A Women's Cup
8	25 January 2023	Estádio Marcelo Leitão, Espargos, Cape Verde	Guinea	1–0	1–0	2023 WAFU Zone A Women's Cup
9	27 January 2023	Estádio Marcelo Leitão, Espargos, Cape Verde	Cape Verde	1–1	1–2	2023 WAFU Zone A Women's Cup
