= Mbassey Darboe =

Gambian association football player

Personal information
- Date of birth: 20 May 1998 (age 28)
- Place of birth: Gambia
- Positions: Midfielder; forward

Team information
- Current team: Determine Girls F.C.
- Number: 8

Senior career*
Years	Team	Apps	(Gls)
2016–2020	Interior FC		
2021–2022	Gambia Police Force		
2022–	Determine Girls F.C.		

International career
2017–	The Gambia		(3)
- * Club domestic league appearances and goals

Mbassey Darboe (born 20 May 1998) is a Gambian professional footballer who plays as a midfielder for Liberian Women's First Division club Determine Girls F.C. and The Gambia national football team.

== Club career ==
In 2013, while playing for New Town's women's team, Darboe was named the inaugural Brikama Female League Best Player. By 2016, the midfielder; already nicknamed Messi in The Gambia, helped Interior win the 2016–17 Women's Domestic League season opener, securing the Super Cup title. In January 2018, she was named the best player of the month in the Country Women's First Division.

In October 2022, Liberia's most successful club Determine Girls announced the signing of Darboe on a season-long loan from her parent club, The Gambia Police Force. Following her arrival, she took part in the 2022 CAF Women's Champions League. Since joining the club, she has been a key player, regularly contributing goals and demonstrating strong tactical awareness. She helped the team win the league title in two consecutive seasons. In November 2024, She was nominated by the Liberia Football Association for the Most Valuable Player and Best Foreign Player awards.

== International career ==
Darboe received her first call-up to the senior national team in 2016 for a match against Casa Sports Women's team at the Soma Mini-Stadium, where Gambia secured a 5–1 victory, with Darboe scoring one of the goals. In May 2017, she was included in Gambia's squad for what was scheduled to be their first-ever official international match against Cape Verde. On 21 December 2019, she scored her first international goal in a 2–4 friendly defeat to Senegal.

=== International goals ===
Scores and results list The Gambia's goal tally first, score column indicates score after each Darboe goal.

No.	Date	Venue	Opponent	Score	Result	Competition
1	21 December 2019	Stade Lat-Dior, Thiès, Senegal	Senegal	2–4	2–4	Friendly match
2	24 February 2025	Stade Lat-Dior, Thiès, Senegal	Niger	1–0	2–1	2026 WAFCON qualifying
3	26 May 2025	Ksar Stadium, Nouakchott, Mauritania	Guinea	1–3	3–4	2025 WAFU Zone A Women's Cup
