= 2022 CAF Women's Champions League WAFU Zone A Qualifiers =

Tournament details
- Host country: Liberia
- City: Paynesville
- Dates: 17–21 August
- Teams: 3 (from 3 associations)

Final positions
- Champions: (Liberia) Determine Girls FC (1st title)
- Runners-up: (Mali) AS Mandé
- Third place: (Senegal) Union Sportive des Parcelles

Tournament statistics
- Matches played: 3
- Goals scored: 3 (1 per match)
- Top scorer(s): Kantie Sayee; Fatoumata Doumbia; Bountou Sylla (1 goal)
- All statistics correct as of 21 August 2022.

The 2022 CAF Women's Champions League WAFU Zone A Qualifiers is the 2nd edition of CAF Women's Champions League WAFU Zone A Qualifiers tournament organised by the WAFU for the women's clubs of association nations. This edition will be held from 17 to 21 August 2022 in Paynesville, Liberia. The winners of the tournament qualified for the 2022 CAF Women's Champions League final tournament .

== Participating teams ==
The following four teams contested in the qualifying tournament.

Team	Qualifying method	Appearances	Previous best performance
(Liberia) Determine Girls FC	2021–22 Liberian Women's Champions	2nd	champions
(Mali) AS Mandé	2021–22 Malian Women's Champions	2nd	n/a
(Senegal) Union Sportive des Parcelles	2021–22 Senegalese Women's Champions	1st	n/a

== Venues ==
Cities	Venues	Capacity
Paynesville	Samuel Kanyon Doe Sports Complex	22,000

== Qualifying tournament ==
Tiebreakers

Teams are ranked according to points (3 points for a win, 1 point for a draw, 0 points for a loss), and if tied on points, the following tiebreaking criteria are applied, in the order given, to determine the rankings.

1. Points in head-to-head matches among tied teams;
2. Goal difference in head-to-head matches among tied teams;
3. Goals scored in head-to-head matches among tied teams;
4. If more than two teams are tied, and after applying all head-to-head criteria above, a subset of teams are still tied, all head-to-head criteria above are reapplied exclusively to this subset of teams;
5. Goal difference in all group matches;
6. Goals scored in all group matches;
7. Penalty shoot-out if only two teams are tied and they met in the last round of the group;
8. Disciplinary points (yellow card = 1 point, red card as a result of two yellow cards = 3 points, direct red card = 3 points, yellow card followed by direct red card = 4 points);
9. Drawing of lots.

All times are Liberia Standard Time UTC -7 .

Pos	Team	Pld	W	D	L	GF	GA	GD	Pts	Qualification	DGF FC	ASM	USPA
1	(Liberia) Determine Girls FC	2	1	1	0	2	1	+1	4	Main tournament	—	1–1	
2	(Mali) AS Mandé	2	0	2	0	1	1	0	2			—	0–0
3	(Senegal) USPA	2	0	1	1	0	1	−1	1		0–1		—

17 August 2022
16:00

Determine Girls FC (Liberia)	1-1	(Mali) AS Mandé
Sayee 83'	Report	Doumbia 90'

Samuel Kanyon Doe Sports Complex, Paynesville

19 August 2022
16:00

AS Mandé (Mali)	0-0	(Senegal) USPA
	Report

Samuel Kanyon Doe Sports Complex, Paynesville

21 August 2022
16:00

Determine Girls FC (Liberia)	1-0	(Senegal) USPA
Sylla 27'	Report

Samuel Kanyon Doe Sports Complex, Paynesville

== Awards and statistics ==
=== Goalscorers ===
There have been 3 goals scored in 3 matches, for an average of 1 goal per match (as of 21 August 2022).

Rank	Player	Team	Goals
1	(Liberia) Kantie Sayee	(Liberia) Determine Girls FC	1
1	(Mali) Fatoumata Doumbia	(Mali) AS Mandé	1
1	(Liberia) Bountou Sylla	(Liberia) Determine Girls FC	1
