= Maimouna Traoré =

Malian footballer (born 1998)

Personal information
- Date of birth: 1 January 1998 (age 28)
- Position: Forward

Team information
- Current team: AS Mandé (women)
- Number: 17

Senior career*
Years	Team	Apps	(Gls)
2018–2021	AS Police de Bamako	0	(0)
2022–	AS Mandé (women)	3	(3)

International career^{‡}
2018–	Mali	2	(0)
- * Club domestic league appearances and goals ‡ National team caps and goals as of 31 December 2023

Maimouna Traoré (born 1 January 1998) is a Malian international footballer who plays as a forward for the Mali women's national football team. She competed for Mali at the 2018 Africa Women Cup of Nations, playing in two matches.
