= Mogbwemo Queens Football Club =

Sierra Leonean women's football team

Mogbwemo Queens
- Full name: Mogbwemo Queens Football Club
- Founded: 2004; 22 years ago
- League: Sierra Leone Women's Premier League

Mogbwemo Queens Football Club is a professional women's association football club from Bonthe, Sierra Leone. It competes in the Sierra Leone Women's Premier League, the top tier women's football league in Sierra Leone.

== History ==
The Mogbwemo Queens Football Club was founded in 2004.

In 2023, the club won the Sierra Leone Women's Premier League, with only one defeat in twenty-two matches played. Their coach, Duramani Janneh, was named Best of the Season and Hannah Juana was received the award for Best Goalkeeper.

Their league victory qualified them for their first continental campaign in the 2023 CAF Women's Champions League. They competed in West Africa's Zone-A qualifiers, where they competed against Determine Girls FC (Liberia), AS Mande (Mali), and Dakar Sacre Coeur (Senegal). Mogbwemo Queens tied eventual group-winner AS Mande, but failed to make it through to the next stage of the competition.

== See also ==
- Sierra Leone Women's Premier League
- CAF Women's Champions League
