= Aigles de la Médina =

Senegalese women's football team

- Full name: Aigles de la Médina
- Founded: 1991; 34 years ago
- Manager: Cheikh Oumar Diouf
- League: Senegalese W-Championship

The Aigles de la Médina is a Senegalese women's football club competing in the Senegalese Women's Championship. The club is based in the city of Dakar in the commune d'arrondissement of Médina.

== History ==
The Eagles of Médina Club was founded in 1991 under the name of Chattes de Dakar. It has been affiliated with the Senegalese Football Federation since 1999, the club has won the Senegal Championship twice (in 2003 and 2007) and the Senegalese Women's Cup three times (in 2005, 2006, and 2009).

During the 2020–2021 season, the Eagles led the championship before losing to the Amazons of Grand-Yoff on the final day, allowing Dakar SC to claim the title on goal difference. In 2023, as the Eagles' best players were transferred to rival clubs, the team struggled to remain in the first division. In 2024, led by the attacking trio of Ndeye Awa Casset, Haby Baldé, and Mbene Kane, the team won the championship again, seven years after their last title. This victory qualified them for the first time for the 2024 CAF Women's Champions League qualifying tournament. They also achieved a double by winning the national cup and the championship in 2024. During the qualifying tournament, they secured a 2-0 victory in their first game against Red Scorpion WFC. In their final match, they triumphed over Determine Girls 2–1, finishing the tournament with two wins, one draw, and one loss against the champions of Mali, AS Mandé. These results earned them seven points, allowing them to top the group and secure their first-ever qualification for the 2024 CAF Women's Champions League. Remarkably, they also became the first team from Senegal to achieve this milestone.

== Players ==
=== Current squad ===
As of 15 November 2024

Note: Flags indicate national team as defined under FIFA eligibility rules; some limited exceptions apply. Players may hold more than one non-FIFA nationality.

No.	Pos.	Nation	Player
1	GK	SEN	Thiaba Gueye Séné
2	MF	SEN	Ngouye Sarr
3	DF	SEN	Anta Dembélé
4	DF	SEN	Fatoumata Dramé
5	DF	SEN	Aïssatou Fall
6	MF	SEN	Aïcha Fall
7	FW	GAM	Mam Drammeh
8	MF	SEN	Fatoumata Ndiaye
9	FW	SEN	Aïssatou Ndiaye
10	MF	SEN	Sadigatou Diallo
11	FW	SEN	Adama Sané

No.	Pos.	Nation	Player
12	MF	SEN	Bineta Korkel Seck
13	MF	SEN	Meta Kandé
14	FW	SEN	Aminata Diop
15	DF	SEN	Ndieme Lô
16	GK	SEN	Khady Faye
17	MF	SEN	Adjaw Diagne
18	DF	SEN	Aminata Kanté
19	DF	SEN	Marie Diokh
20	DF	SEN	Aïssatou Chris Ba
21	FW	SEN	Jeanne Niang
—	FW	SEN	Haby Baldé

== Honours ==
Type	Competition	Titles	Winning Seasons	Runners-up
Domestic	Senegalese Women's Championship	4	2003, 2007, 2024, 2025	2001, 2002, 2004, 2010, 2011, 2012, 2013, 2021
Domestic	Senegalese Women's Cup	4	2005, 2006, 2009, 2024	

== See also ==
- Senegalese Women's Championship
- Senegalese Women's Cup
- CAF Women's Champions League
