= Bountou Sylla =

Guinean footballer (born 2000)

Personal information
- Date of birth: 30 January 2000 (age 26)
- Place of birth: Guinea
- Position: Striker

Team information
- Current team: Tamra

Senior career*
Years	Team	Apps	(Gls)
2021–2025	Determine Girls	61	(93)
2023–2024	Adana İdman Yurdu	0	(0)
2022	Tamra	24	(27)

International career
2019	Guinea	1	(1)
- * Club domestic league appearances and goals

Bountou Sylla (born 30 January 2000) is a Guinean footballer who plays as a striker for Tamra F.C. and the Guinea women's national football team.

== Club career ==
Sylla played for Liberian side Determine Girls, helping the club win the league. She played in the CAF Champions League after what was described as an " illustrious performance" in the WAFU Zone A qualifiers.

In 2022, Sylla broke the Guinean record for number of goals scored in a single season in the Orange Women's league with 56 total goals. She is also the first Guinean player to win league titles in both women's leagues, as well as the Petro Trade Cup. She was the second Guinean to win the Petro Trade Cup.

== International career ==
Sylla played for the Guinea women's national football team in 2017.

== Style of play ==
Sylla mainly operates as a striker and is known for her speed.

== Personal life ==
Sylla has an older brother who also played football.

She received media attention for not being allowed receive a medal at a Liberian football trophy ceremony due to wearing a Guinean flag.

== Career statistics ==
=== Club ===
Club	Season	Division	League		Cup		Continental		Total	
Club	Season	Division	Apps	Goals	Apps	Goals	Apps	Goals	Apps	Goals
Determine Girls	2021-22	LFA Upper Women	22	56			3	2	25	58
Determine Girls	2022-23	LFA Upper Women					2	1	2	1
Determine Girls	2024-25	LFA Upper Women	21	37	1	3	4	4	26	44
Determine Girls	Total		43	93	1	3	9	7	53	103
Tamra	2022-23	Women's Leumit League	14	12					14	12
Tamra	2025-26	Women's Leumit League	10	15					10	15
Tamra	Total		24	27					24	27
Total career			67	120	1	3	9	7	77	130
