= Red Scorpion Women Football Club =

Gambian women's football team

Red Scorpion(s)
- Full name: Red Scorpion(s) Women Football Club
- Nickname: The Scorpions
- Founded: 1988; 38 years ago
- Ground: Bakau Mini Stadium
- Capacity: 5,000
- Manager: Choro Mbenga
- League: GFF Women's League Division One
Home colours	Away colours

The Red Scorpion(s) Women Football Club is a Gambian women's professional football club competing in the GFF Women's League Division One. The club is based in the city of Bakau west of the capital city of Banjul.

== History ==
The club was founded in 1988 under the name Dolphins. The Red Scorpions won the Gambian Super Cup in 2016 and 2019. In 2016, during a match against Interior FC, they assaulted the referee. As a result, several players and staff members were suspended for a year, and the club was administratively relegated to the second division. They became champions of Gambia again in 2022. In the 2022–23 season, led by Kumba Kuyateh, the Red Scorpions won the championship again, remaining undefeated throughout the season.

== Honours ==
Type	Competition	Titles	Winning seasons	Runners-up
Domestic	GFF Women's League Division One	10	2006, 2008, 2011, 2012, 2014, 2018, 2019, 2022, 2023, 2024	
Domestic	Gambian Women's Cup	3	2015, 2019, 2024	

== See also ==
- GFF Women's League Division One
- CAF Women's Champions League
