= GFF Women's League Division One =

- Founded: 2000
- Country: Gambia
- Confederation: CAF
- Relegation to: GFF Women's League Division two
- International cup: CAF W-Champions League
- Most championships: Red Scorpions
- Current: 2026

The GFF Women's League Division One is the top level women's association football league in Gambia, organised by the Women's Football Association (WFA).

== History ==
In 2000 The GFF Women's League Division One takes off to be the top level women's football league in Gambia. The number of women's football team keeps growing in Gambia, so now we have first division with 12 as a part of the Gambian football federation strategic plan to develop women's football in Gambia.

== Champions ==
The list of champions and runners-up:

Saison	Champion	Runner-up
2000	Company Ten	
2001	Company Ten	
2002	Company Ten	
2003	Company Ten	
2004	Company Ten	
2005	Company Ten	
2006	Red Scorpions	
2007	Interior FC	
2008	Red Scorpions	
2009	Interior FC	
2010	inconnu	
2011	Red Scorpions	
2012	Red Scorpions	
2013	non disputé	
2014	Red Scorpions	
2015	Interior FC	
2016	Interior FC	
2017	Interior FC	Gambia Armed Forces FC
2018	Red Scorpions	Interior
2019	Red Scorpions	Interior
2020	abandoned due to Covid-19 pandemic	
2021	Gambia Police Force FC	Red Scorpions
2021-2022	Red Scorpions	Gambia Police Force
2022-2023	Red Scorpions	Berewuleng

== Most successful clubs ==
Rank	Club	Champions	Runners-up	Winning seasons	Runners-up seasons
1	Red Scorpions	8	0		
2	Company Ten	6	0		
3	Gambia Police Force FC	6	0		

== Top goalscorers ==
Season	Player	Team	Goals
2020	(Sierra Leone) Musa Tambo	Port Authority	15
