= Senegalese Women's Championship =

- Founded: 1992; 34 years ago
- Country: Senegal
- Confederation: CAF
- Number of clubs: 12
- Relegation to: W-Championship D2
- Domestic cup: Senegalese W-Cup
- International cup: CAF W-Champions League
- Current champions: Aigles de la Médina (3rd title) (2024)
- Most championships: Sirènes de Grand Yoff (14 titles)
- Current: 2025–26 W-Championship

The Senegalese Women's Championship is the top flight of women's association football in Senegal. The competition is run by the Senegalese Football Federation.

== History ==
The first Senegalese women's championship was contested in 1992.

== Champions ==
The list of champions and runners-up:

Year	Champions	Runners-up
1992		
1993	not held	
1994	not held	
1995		
1996	not held	
1997	Sirènes de la Patte d'Oie	
1998	Sirènes de la Patte d'Oie	
1999	not held	
2000	not held	
2001	Sirènes de la Patte d'Oie	Aigles de la Médina
2002	Sirènes de la Patte d'Oie	Aigles de la Médina
2003	Aigles de la Médina	Sirènes de Grand Yoff
2004	Sirènes de Grand Yoff	Aigles de la Médina
2005	Sirènes de Grand Yoff	
2006	Sirènes de Grand Yoff	
2007	Aigles de la Médina	
2008	not held	
2009	Sirènes de Grand Yoff	
2010	Sirènes de Grand Yoff	Aigles de la Médina
2011	Sirènes de Grand Yoff	Aigles de la Médina
2012	Sirènes de Grand Yoff	Aigles de la Médina
2013	Sirènes de Grand Yoff	Aigles de la Médina
2014	Sirènes de Grand Yoff	Amazones de Grand Yoff
2015	Lycée Ameth Fall de Saint-Louis	Sirènes de Grand Yoff
2016	Lycée Ameth Fall de Saint-Louis	Sirènes de Grand Yoff
2017	ASC Mediour de Rufisque	
2018	Sirènes de Grand Yoff	Lycée Ameth Fall de Saint-Louis
2019	Amazones de Grand Yoff	Casa Sports
2020	abandoned because of the COVID-19 pandemic in Senegal	
2021	AS Dakar Sacré-Cœur	Aigles de la Médina
2022	US Parcelles Assainies	AS Dakar Sacré-Cœur
2023	AS Dakar Sacré-Cœur	Sirènes de Grand Yoff
2024	Aigles de la Médina	AS Bambey
2025	Aigles de la Médina	AS Bambey

Rq:

Jappo Olympique de Guediawaye (ex. Sirènes de la Patte d'Oie and ex. Sirènes de Grand Yoff)

== Most successful clubs ==
Rank	Club	Champions	Runners-up	Winning seasons	Runners-up seasons
1	Jappo Olympique de Guediawaye	14	4	1997, 1998, 2001, 2002, 2004, 2005, 2006, 2009, 2010, 2011, 2012, 2013, 2014, 2018	2003, 2015, 2016, 2023
2	Aigles de la Médina	3	8	2003, 2007, 2024	2001, 2002, 2004, 2010, 2011, 2012, 2013, 2021
3	Lycée Ameth Fall de Saint-Louis	2	1	2015, 2016	2018
3	Dakar Sacré-Cœur	2	1	2021, 2023	2022
5	Amazones de Grand Yoff	1	1	2019	2014
6	ASC Mediour de Rufisque	1	0	2017	
6	US Parcelles Assainies	1	0	2022	
8	Casa Sports	0	1		2019
8	AS Bambey	0	1		2024

== Top goalscorer ==
Season	Player	Team	Goals
2018-19	(Senegal) Nguenar Ndiaye	Grand-Yoff	29
2021-22	(Senegal) Ndèye Awa Casset	Aigle de la Médina	10
2022-23	(Senegal) Korka Fall	Sacré-Cœur	24
2023-24	(Mauritania) Tacko Diabira	Sacré-Cœur	16
2024-25	(Mauritania) Tacko Diabira	Sacré-Cœur	11

== See also ==
- Senegalese Women's Cup
