= AS Dakar Sacré-Cœur (women) =

Senegalese women's football team

- Full name: Association sportive Dakar Sacré-Cœur
- Nickname: Le club de la SICAP
- Founded: 2017; 8 years ago
- Ground: Stade Demba Diop
- Capacity: 15,000
- President: Mathieu Chupin
- Coach: Aïssatou Seck
- League: Senegalese Women's Championship
- Website: http://www.dakarsacrecoeur.com

The Association sportive Dakar Sacré-Cœur women's team is a Senegalese women's football club based in Dakar, in the SICAP-Mermoz municipality. The club is a partner of the Olympique Lyonnais.

== History ==
Established in 2017, the section was promoted to the top division in 2019.

The club became the Senegal women's champion for the first time in 2021, surpassing the Aigles de la Médina on goal difference after a 4–0 victory against the Amazones de Grand-Yoff on the final matchday.

Dakar SC represented Senegal in the inaugural edition of the CAF Women's Champions League but was eliminated by finishing second in the UFOA A zone qualifiers behind AS Mandé, following a 4–0 defeat against the Malian team. After conceding their national crown to USPA in 2022, Dakar SC reclaimed their throne the following season, surpassing the Sirènes de Grand-Yoff in the standings.

== Honours ==
Type	Competition	Titles	Winning Seasons	Runners-up
Domestic	Senegalese Women's Championship	2	2021, 2023	2022
Domestic	Senegalese Women's Cup	0		

== See also ==
- Senegalese Women's Championship
- Senegalese Women's Cup
- CAF Women's Champions League
