= Malian Women's Championship =

Women's Ligue 1
- Founded: 2016; 10 years ago
- Country: Mali
- Confederation: CAF
- Number of clubs: 12
- Relegation to: W-Ligue 2
- Domestic cup: Malian Women's Cup
- International cup: CAF W-Champions League
- Current champions: AS Mandé (2nd title) (2021-22)
- Most championships: AS Mandé (2 titles)
- Current: 2025–26 W-Championship

The Malian Women's Championship also called Women's Ligue 1 (French: Championnat du Mali féminin) is the top flight of women's association football in Mali. The competition is run by the Malian Football Federation.

== History ==
Women's football was born in Mali on 1994 by the creation of the Bamako League. This league was held every year until 2014. It was dominated essentially by Super Lionnes d'Hamdallaye and AS Mandé who both won many titles.

On 2016, the Malian Football Federation created the first national women's championship.

== Champions ==
The list of champions and runners-up:

Year	Champions	Runners-up
2016–17	AS Mandé	AS Real Bamako
2017–18	not held	
2018–19	not held	
2019–20	abandoned because of COVID-19 pandemic in Mali	
2021	AS Mandé	Super Lionnes
2022	AS Mandé	Super Lionnes
2023	AS Mandé	Super Lionnes

== Most successful clubs ==
Rank	Club	Champions	Runners-up	Winning seasons	Runners-up seasons
1	AS Mandé	3	0	2017, 2021,2022	
2	AS Real Bamako	0	1		2017
2	Super Lionnes	0	2		2021,2022

== See also ==
- Malian Women's Cup
