= Oumou Kone =

Malian footballer (born 1999)

Personal information
- Date of birth: 20 December 1999 (age 26)
- Position: Forward

Team information
- Current team: Super Lionnes

Senior career*
Years	Team	Apps	(Gls)
- Super Lionnes

International career
- Mali
- * Club domestic league appearances and goals

Oumou Kone (born 20 December 1999) is a Malian footballer who plays as a forward for Super Lionnes and the Mali women's national team.

== Early years ==
Oumou Kone was born on 20 December 1999.

== International career ==
Kone capped for Mali at senior level during the 2014 Africa Women Cup of Nations qualification.

In July 2022, Kone scored two goals and assisted on a third, to beat Netherlands 3–1 at the 2022 CISM World Military Women's Soccer Championship in Spokane, Washington, United States.
