= Sierra Leone Women's Premier League =

Sierra Leone
- Founded: 2000
- Country: Sierra Leone
- Confederation: CAF
- International cup: CAF W-Champions League
- Current champions: Mogbwemo Queens (2022-2023)
- Most championships: East End Lionesses
- Top scorer: (Guinea-Bissau) Mariama Sambu (125 goals)
- Current: 2025–26

The Sierra Leone Women's Premier League is the top level women's association football league in Sierra Leone.

== History ==
On October 20, 2022, the Women's Premier League returned to Sierra Leone. The opening match of the new Women's Premier League was held Saturday in the northern town of Makeni where visitors Kahunla Queens of Kenema beat hosts Mena Queens 1–0. The 12-team league is making a comeback after a 32-year absence. It was first launched in the early 1990s.

== Champions ==
The list of champions and runners-up:

Season	Champion
1992-1993	Soccer Queens
1993-1994	East End Lionesses
1995-1999	
2000	East End Lionesses
2001	East End Lionesses
2002-2004	
2005	Republic of Sierra Leone Armed Forces
2006	East End Lionesses
2008	Buck United
2009	Soccer Angels
2010-2011	
2012	Sierra Leone Police
2013	Cancelled
2014	Suba United FC
2017	Rising Queens
2019	Mahmoud FC
2020-2021	Suba United FC
2021-2022	Not held
2022-2023	Mogbwemo Queens
2023-2024	Mogbwemo Queens
2024-2025	Ram Kamara FC
2025-26	Mogbwemo Queens

== Top goalscorers ==
Season	Player	Team	Goals
2019	(Sierra Leone) Musa Tambo	East End Lionesses	15
2020-21	(Sierra Leone) Musa Tambo	Bo Rangers	19
2022-23	(Sierra Leone) Kumba Brima	Kahunla	26
2023-24	(Sierra Leone) Kumba Brima	Kallon	39
2024-25	(Guinea-Bissau) Mariama Sambu	Ram Kamara	44
2025-26	(Guinea-Bissau) Mariama Sambu	Ram Kamara	48

Most goals by a player in a single season

- 48 goals.
  - (Guinea-Bissau) Mariama Sambu (2025-26).
