= Liberian Women's First Division =

LFA Women's First Division
- Founded: 2001; 25 years ago
- Country: Liberia
- Confederation: CAF
- Number of clubs: 10
- Relegation to: W-Second Division
- Domestic cup: LFA W-Cup
- International cup: CAF W-Champions League
- Current champions: Determine Girls (2nd title) (2022–23)
- Most championships: Earth Angels (8 titles)
- Top scorer: Decontee Jackson (170 goals)
- Current: 2025–26 W-First Division

The Liberian Women's First Division called LFA Women's First Division is the top flight of women's association football in Liberia. The competition is run by the Liberia Football Association.

== History ==
The first Liberian women's championship started on 2001.

== Champions ==
The list of champions and runners-up:

Year	Champions	Runners-up
2001	Earth Angels	
2002	Tito United	Earth Angels
2003		
2004	Earth Angels	Tito United
2005	Tito United	
2006	Earth Angels	
2007		
2008		
2009	Earth Angels	Professional Anchors
2010		
2011		
2012	Earth Angels	
2013	Blanco FC	Earth Angels
2014	Earth Angels	Senior Pros FC
2015	not held	
2016	Senior Pros FC	Earth Angels
2017		
2018	Earth Angels	
2019	Earth Angels	Blanco FC
2020	abandoned because of the COVID-19 pandemic in Liberia	
2021	Determine Girls FC	Blanco FC
2022	Determine Girls FC	Blanco FC
2023	Determine Girls FC	Ambassador FC

== Top goalscorers ==
Season	Player	Team	Goals
2015-16	(Liberia) Bernice Willie	Seniors Pro	57
2018-19	(Liberia) Angelie Kieh	Earth Angels	42
2019-20	(Liberia) Angelie Kieh	Earth Angels	26
2019-20	(Liberia) Agatha Nimene	Blanco	26
2021-22	(Guinea) Bountou Sylla	Determine Girls	56
2022-23	(Liberia) Decontee Jackson	Ambassadors	38
2023-24	(Guinea) Mabinty Camara	Determine Girls	41
2024-25	(Guinea) Bountou Sylla	Determine Girls	37
2025-26	(Guinea) Mabinty Camara	Determine Girls	23

== See also ==
- Liberian FA Women's Cup
- Liberian Women's Super Cup
