= AS Mandé (women) =

Association football women's club

- Full name: Association Sportive de Mandé
- Nickname: Les Mandekas (The Mandekas)
- Ground: Bamako
- Coach: Abdramane Maïga
- League: Malian Women's Championship
- 2020–21: Malian Women's Championship, 1st of 12 (champions)

Association Sportive de Mandé is a Malian professional women's football club based in the capital city, Bamako. It currently plays in the Malian Women's Championship, the women's top tier of Malian football. The club is affiliated to AS Mandé, a men's team who previously played in the Malian Première Division.

The club has won the women's championship in 2021 season. Following that, they were selected as the representative for Mali at the WAFU A qualifiers which they won after beating Senegalese team AS Dakar Sacré-Cœur by 4–0 in the finals and qualified them to the inaugural 2021 CAF Women's Champions League.

== Players ==
=== Current squad ===
As of 17 August 2022

Note: Flags indicate national team as defined under FIFA eligibility rules; some limited exceptions apply. Players may hold more than one non-FIFA nationality.

No.	Pos.	Nation	Player
—	GK	MLI	Mariam Camara
—	GK	GUI	Aissatou Diallo
—	GK	MLI	Koumba Diallo
—	GK	MLI	Sadio Sow
—	DF	MLI	Oumou Coulibaly
—	DF	MLI	Djeneba Doumbia
—	DF	MLI	Aïssata Keita
—	DF	MLI	Baro Koné
—	DF	MLI	Salimata Koné
—	DF	MLI	Oumou Traoré
—	DF	MLI	Bintou Guindo

No.	Pos.	Nation	Player
—	MF	GUI	Mabinty Camara
—	MF	MLI	Fatoumata Doumbia
—	MF	MLI	Fatoumata Diarra
—	MF	MLI	Aminata Dia
—	MF	MLI	Korotoumou Keita
—	FW	MLI	Bassira Touré
—	FW	GUI	Hawa Nènè Conté
—	FW	MLI	Rokia Coulibaly
—	FW	MLI	Sali Koné
—	FW	MLI	Awa Traoré

== Honours ==
=== Domestic ===
League titles

- Malian Women's Championship

Winners (2): 2017, 2021

- Malian Women's Cup

Winners (4): 2012, 2014, 2015, 2016

- Bamako League

Winners (7): 2004, 2007, 2009, 2010, 2011, 2013, 2014

=== Continental ===
- WAFU A-CAF Women's Champions League Qualifiers

Winners (1): 2021

== See also ==
- Malian Women's Championship
- Malian Women's Cup
