= Determine Girls F.C. =

Liberian women's football club

Determine Girls
- Full name: Determine Girls Football Club
- Founded: February 24, 2005; 20 years ago
- Ground: Antoinette Tubman Stadium
- Capacity: 10,000
- President: Grace Hawa Weah
- Manager: Robert Lartey
- League: Liberian Women's First Division
- 2024–25: 1st of 12

Determine Girls Football Club is a Liberian professional women's association football club founded on 24 February 2005 and based in Monrovia, . The club is in the Liberian Women's First Division, the top tier of women's football in Liberia. Due to its quality players and exciting style of play, it is regarded as the best female football club in the country.

== History ==
The club was founded in 2005. It has won five consecutive league titles (beginning 2019/2020 league season to present). The club had its debut (in 2021) within the inaugural edition of the CAF Women's Champions League Qualifier (WAFU ZONE A), which was hosted in Cape Verde, but didn't make it to the group stages of the competition, after finishing third.

After winning its second national championship, the club represented Liberia within the second edition of the CAF Women's Champions League Qualifiers (WAFU ZONE A) which was hosted in Libera. During this time (in 2022), Determine Girls fulfilled one of its dreams by winning the competition and qualifying for the group stages of the CAF Women's Champions League in Morocco.

== Players ==
=== Current squad ===
As of 29 July 2025

Note: Flags indicate national team as defined under FIFA eligibility rules; some limited exceptions apply. Players may hold more than one non-FIFA nationality.

No.	Pos.	Nation	Player
1	GK	GUI	Djaka Haidara
29	GK	LBR	Jackie Touah
30	GK	LBR	Anita Davies
4	DF	GAM	Ruggy Joof
5	DF	LBR	Marie Flomo
3	DF	LBR	Hajar Kelleh
14	DF	LBR	Jennie Tisdell
16	DF	LBR	Diamond Dahn
15	DF	LBR	Gertrude Gbormue
8	MF	GAM	Mbassey Darboe
17	DF	LBR	Margaret Stewart (Captain)
11	DF	SLE	Rashidatu Kamara
24	DF	LBR	Diata Langama

No.	Pos.	Nation	Player
28	MF	LBR	Louise Browne
19	MF	LBR	Success Gaye
18	MF	LBR	Bendu Yantay (On loan from Senior Female Professional FC)
7	FW	LBR	Dalphine Glao
20	FW	LBR	Marthaline Moore
10	FW	GUI	Mabinty Camara
25	FW	GAM	Catherine Jatta
2	MF	GUI	Marie Sylla
13	FW	LBR	Comfort Wleh

=== Notable players ===
- (The Gambia) Mbassey Darboe
- (The Gambia) Catherine Jatta
- (Guinea) Bountou Sylla
- (Liberia) Dalphine Glao

== Honours ==
=== National ===
Liberian Women's First Division

- Winners (5): 2020–21, 2021–22, 2022–23, 2023-2024, 2024-2025

Petro Trade Cup/Orange Cup

- Winners (3): 2021–22, 2022–23, 2024-2025

LFA Super Cup

- Winners (3): 2021, 2022, 2023

=== CAF Women's Champions League ===
WAFU Zone A Qualifiers:

- Winner (1): 2022
- Second place (1):2024
- Third place (2): 2021, 2023

CAF Women's Champions League:

- Group stage (1): 2022

== Technical staff ==
- Robert Lartey – Head coach
- Patience Gweh – Deputy Coach
- Abu Sheriff - Goalkeeping coach
- Chally Johnson – Team Manager
- Emmanuel Z- Play Bearkie – Physical Trainer
- Mary Kamara – Medics
- Jill Deah - Physiotherapist
- Emmanuel Bono – kits manager
