= Nayiga Patricia =

Ugandan footballer (born 2008)

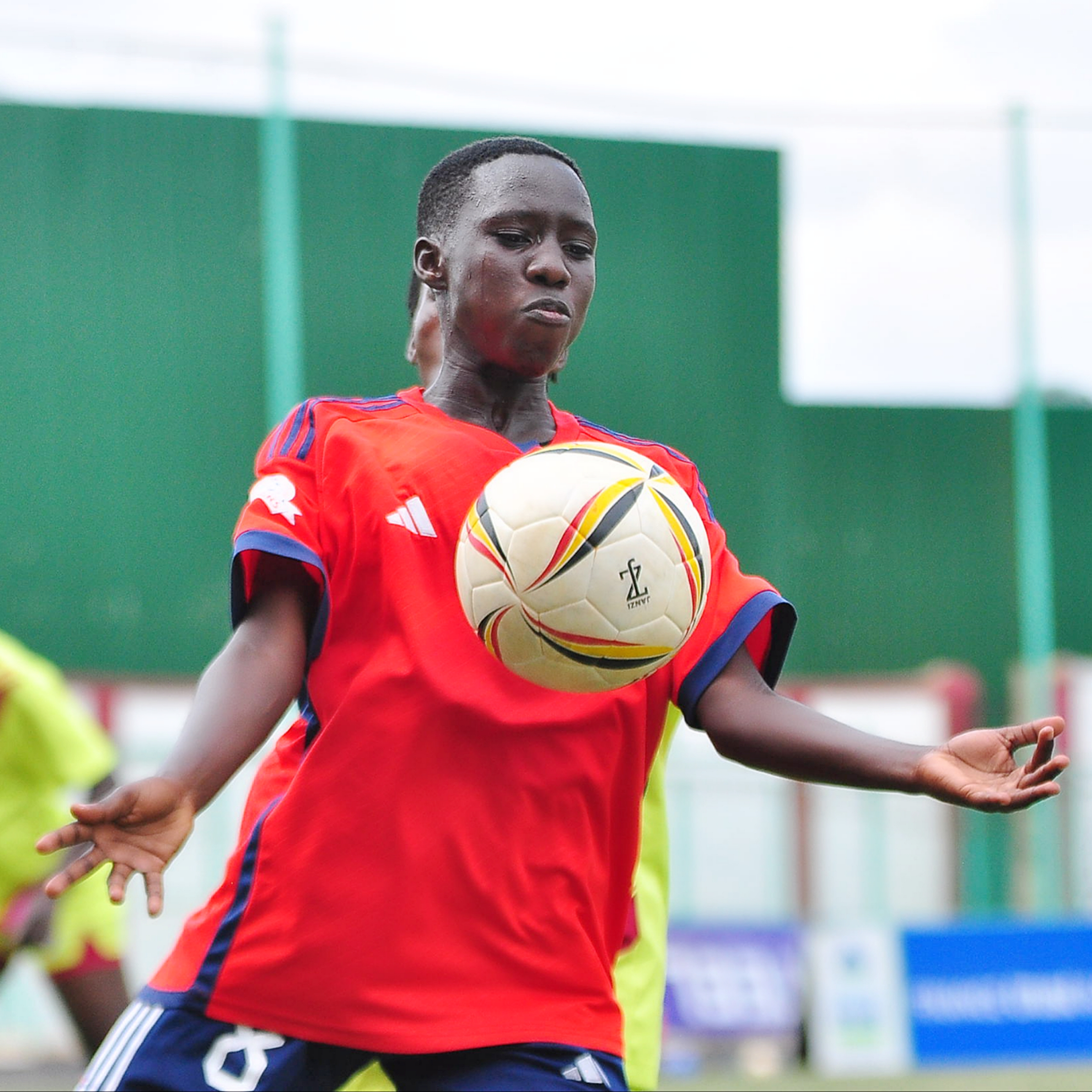
- Patricia controlling the ball on chest

Personal information
- Full name: NAYIGA PATRICIA
- Date of birth: 27 January 2008 (age 18)
- Place of birth: Mulago hospital,Kampala
- Position: Midfielder

Team information
- Current team: Wakiso Hill WFC
- Number: 8

Nayiga Patricia (born 27 January 2008) is a Ugandan footballer who plays as midfielder and she is a former captain for Wakiso Hills Women Football Club, currently playing for St Noa Girls SS Zzana.

== Educational background ==
Nayiga began her elementary education in 2012 at Sendrax Primary School, Kagoma. Later, she transferred to Pearl Primary School, where she completed her primary level education in 2017. Nayiga Patricia completed her Uganda Certificate of Education (UCE) in 2024 at Wakiso Hills Secondary School and in 2025 she joined St Noa Girls Secondary School Zzana for her advanced level education.

== Journey into football ==
Nayiga developed a passion for football in 2013, inspired by a neighbor named Ashiraf, whose exceptional skills motivated her to pursue the sport. She began playing football that same year, training barefoot with friends in her home village. In 2017, she joined Highness Soccer Academy in Kanyange, where she received structured training under Coach Mawejje. Her talent and dedication quickly became evident, setting her apart as a promising young footballer. In 2019, following her Primary Seven education, Nayiga was offered a bursary to join Wakiso Hills Secondary School, thanks to the efforts of Coach Kasajjage Umar, who recognized her potential. At Wakiso Hills, Nayiga continued to develop her football skills while pursuing her education. As of 2024, her bursary agreement with Wakiso Hills Secondary School is nearing completion, leaving her with the choice to renew her stay or seek new opportunities for her academic and football career.

== International career ==
Nayiga participated in the regional Championship that took place from 25 July to 3 August 2023 in Dar es Salaam, Tanzania. She was chosen to participate in the FIFA U-20 Women’s World Cup Qualifier in Dakar, Senegal.
