= Wakiso Hills Women Football Club =

Ugandan women's association football club

- Nickname: The Antelopes
- Founded: 2010
- Stadium: St. Mary's
- Capacity: 15,000
- Chairman: Wilber Shaka
- League: FUFA Women Super League
- 2024/2025: 12th (Relegated)

Wakiso Hills Women Football Club, also known as "The Antelopes", is a professional women's football club competing in the FUFA Women Super League. They are located in the Maya Wakiso District of Uganda.

Wilber Shaka is the current club president.

== History ==
Wakiso Hills WFC was founded in 2010 as a "Girls School Team" and they are one of the pioneer clubs of the FUFA Women Elite League.

Antelopes played in the FUFA Women Elite League in 2014/2015 During 2015/2016, the second edition of the FUFA Women Elite League kicked off, and the host (Wakiso Hills WFC) were defeated by London Collage Nansana 2-0 at the Wakiso district headquarters playgrounds on 7 November 2015.

The Antelopes entered into Partnership with Vipers SC as their sole Men's football club They will be the official women's team in all CAF, FUFA, and FIFA engagements. The Antelopes will retain their property rights and brand image but will have to corroborate with the Vipers Sports Clubs in terms of technical development, marketing, and club infrastructure.

The Antelopes secured their entry to the 2024/2025 FUFA Women Super League after defeating the She Maroons 1-0. The winning goal was scored by Patricia Naiga, securing second position in the FUFA Elite League 2022/2023.

In October 2023, Wakiso Hills unveiled new players, which included Fatumah Nakasumba, Rashidah Nankya, Zaitun Namaganda, Teopista Apino, Phoebe Banura, Maureen Kimono, Esther Namaganda, Prossy Nashipond and Bakkitta Amina.

Management announced the replacement of Coach Kamya Swaleh by Rogers Nkugwa, who joined the Club on a one-year contract. Umar Kassjagwe and Coach Trevor as his assistants, Mathew Lumu as the Fitness coach and Eric Kiggundu as their Physiotherapist.

In 2023, The Antelopes confirmed Claire Mulindwa as their patron and Hajjat Aisha Nakirijja as their new Finance Managers.

== Stadium ==
St. Mary's Kitende has a seating capacity of 20,000 with more than 1,000 VIP seats.

== Technical Team ==
Head Coach; Frank Mulindwa

Assistant Coaches; John Ssaka

Fitness Coach; Matthew Lumu.

Physiotherapist; Eric Kiggundu.

== Non Technical Team ==
Patron; Claire Mulidwa.

Finance Manager; Aisha Nakirijja
