= Tünel, Khövsgöl =

District in Khövsgöl Province, Mongolia

Coordinates: 49°51′31″N 100°37′40″E

Tünel District Түнэл сум ᠲᠦᠨᠡᠯᠰᠤᠮᠤ
- District
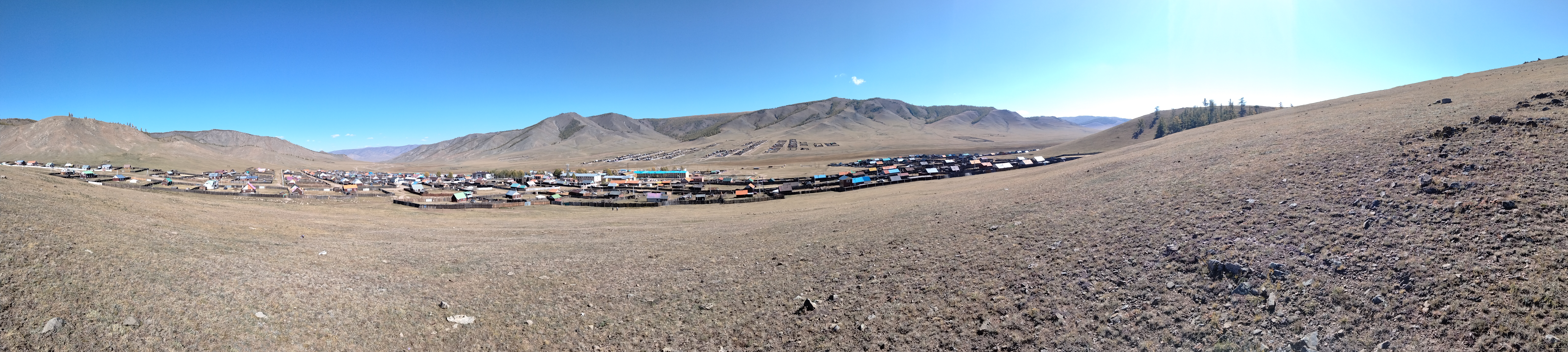
- Tunel, October 2024

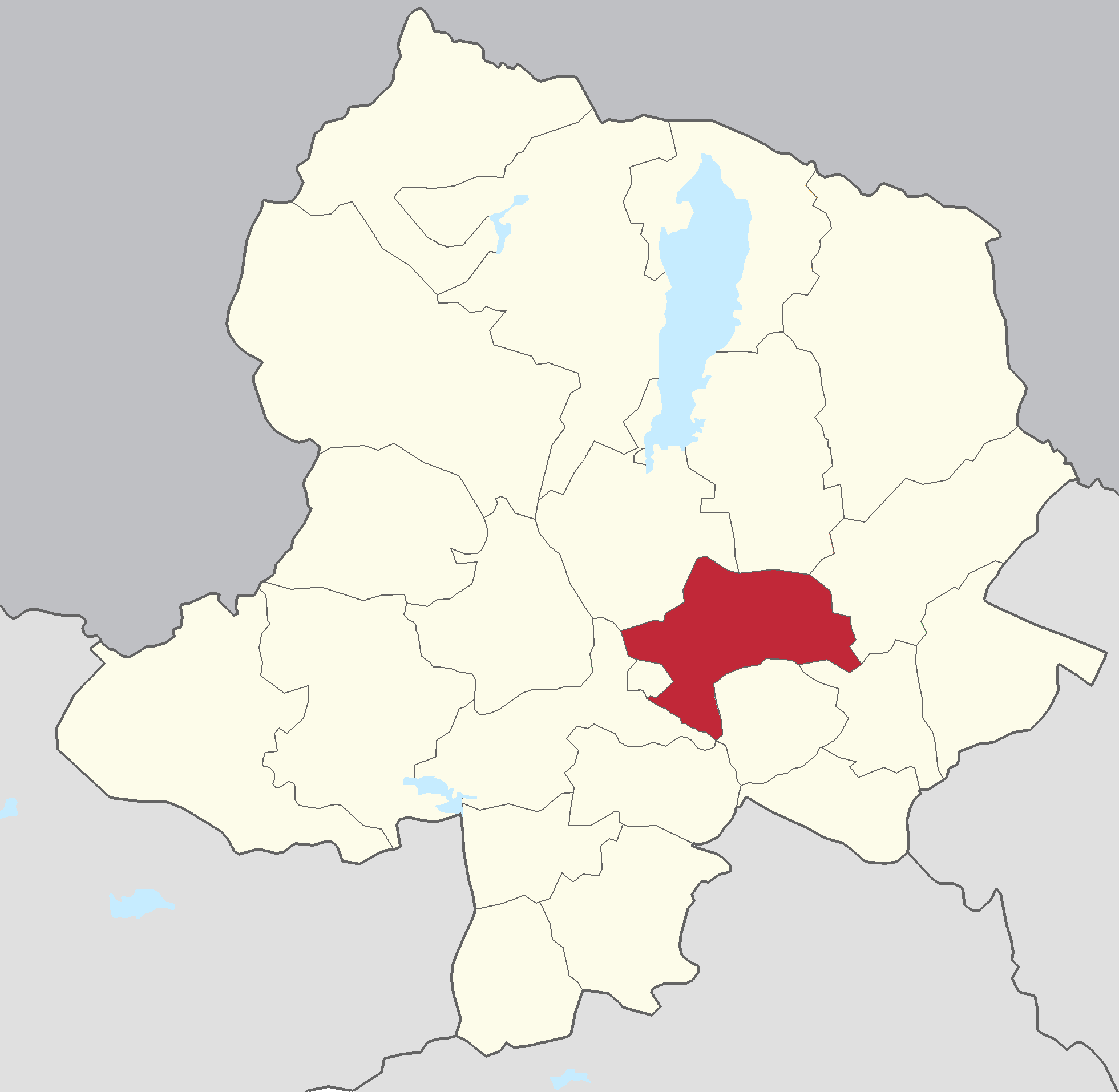
- Tünel District in Khövsgöl Province
- Country: Mongolia
- Province: Khövsgöl Province
- Time zone: UTC+8 (UTC + 8)

Tünel (Mongolian: Түнэл) is a sum of Khövsgöl aimag. The area is 3,580 km^{2}, of which about one third is forest. In 2000, Tünel had a population of 4,556 people, including some Khotgoid. The sum center, officially named Bulag (Mongolian: Булаг), is located 46 km north-east of Mörön and 667 km from Ulaanbaatar.

== History ==
The Tünel sum was founded in 1952 from parts of the Büren, Tosontsengel, Erdenebulgan, and Alag-Erdene sums. In 1956, it became part of Bürentogtokh sum, but was separated again in 1959. In 1938, a "Khar Usny Jingiin" negdel was founded in this area, some other small negdels named "Altan Taria", "Khödölmör", "Egiin Dolgio" etc. followed and were joined to form the "Yalalt" negdel in 1956.

== Administrative divisions ==
The district is divided into six bags, which are:

- Altgana
- Bayan-Erkhet
- Biij
- Bulag
- Navchiltai
- Zunii gol

== Economy ==
In 2004, there were about 101,000 heads of livestock, among them 50,000 goats, 34,000 sheep, 10,600 cattle and yaks, 6,600 horses and 84 camels.

== Literature ==
- M. Nyamaa, Khövsgöl aimgiin lavlakh toli, Ulaanbaatar 2001, p. 138f
