= Alag-Erdene, Khövsgöl =

District in Khövsgöl Province, Mongolia

Alag-Erdene District Алаг-Эрдэнэ сум ᠠᠯᠠᠭᠡᠷᠳᠡᠨᠢᠰᠤᠮᠤ
- District
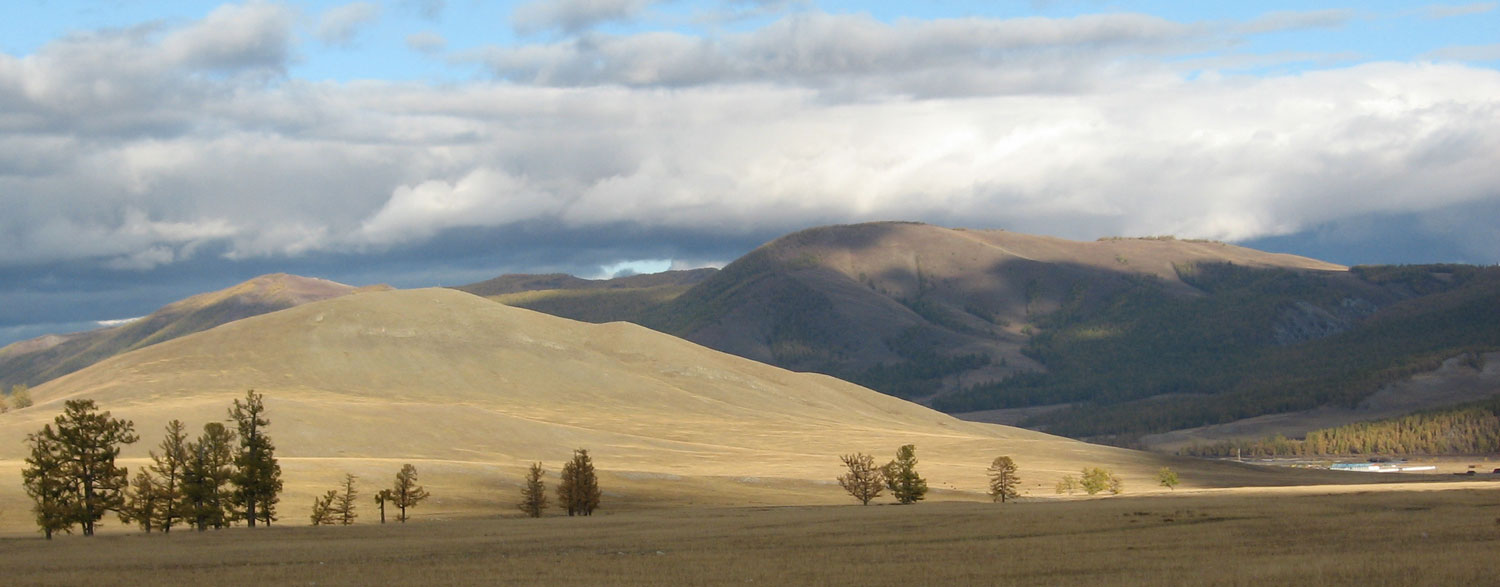
- Close to Alag-Erdene sum center, September 2006

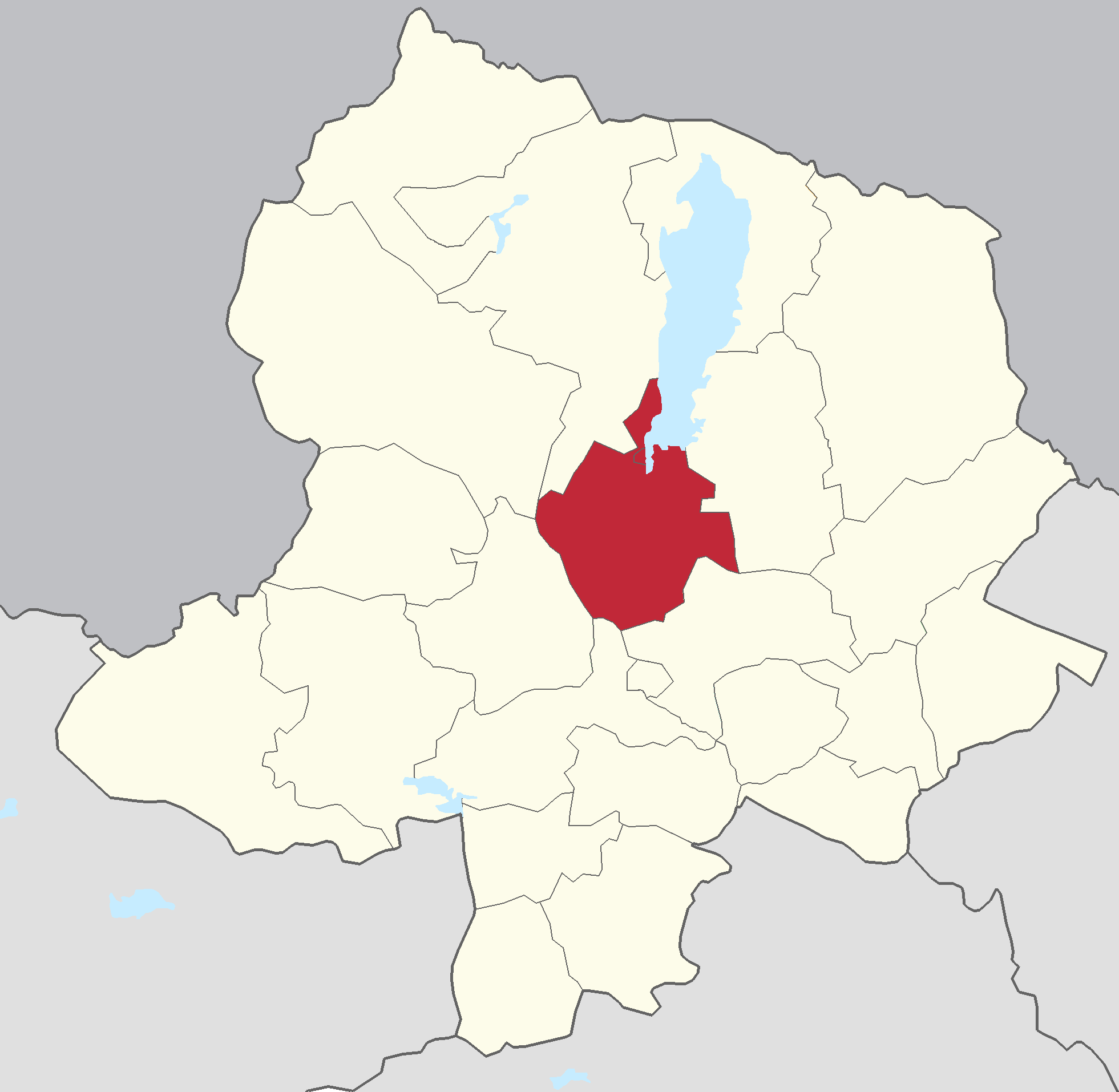
- Alag-Erdene District in Khövsgöl Province

- Location in Mongolia
- Coordinates: 50°07′02″N 100°02′45″E
- Country: Mongolia
- Province: Khövsgöl Province

Population (2005)
  - Total: 2,992
- Time zone: UTC+8
- Website: alag-erdene.khs.gov.mn

Alag-Erdene (Mongolian: Алаг-Эрдэнэ, lit. 'variegated gem') is a sum (district) of Khövsgöl aimag (province). The area is about 4,500 km², of which 1,460 km² are forest, and 2,760 km² are pasture. In 2005, the sum had 2992 inhabitants, including some Darkhad, Khotogoid, and Uriankhai. The center, officially named Mankhan (Mongolian: Манхан) is situated close to the road from Mörön to Khatgal, 62 km north of Mörön and 733 kilometers from Ulaanbaatar.

== History ==
The Alag-Erdene sum was founded, together with the whole Khövsgöl aimag, in 1931. In 1933, it had about 3,400 inhabitants in 1006 households, and about 82,000 heads of livestock. In 1942, two bags were transferred to Renchinlkhümbe, in 1952 two other bags became part of Tünel sum. In 1956, three bags were transferred from Büren sum, together with the Khögjil negdel.

== Economy ==
In 2004, there were roughly 76,000 heads of livestock, among them 26,000 sheep, 36,000 goats, 11,500 cattle and yaks, 6,400 horses, and 33 camels. During the 1980s, Soviet geologists conducted large-scale exploration projects for phosphorite in the area, but these projects were discontinued in the early 1990s, due to both the general political/economic situation after the end of socialism, and the discontent of the local population. Other commodities include black coal, graphite, and quartz.

== Administrative divisions ==
The district is divided into five bags, which are:

- Mankhan
- Shuvuut
- Tsagaan Burgas
- Ujig / Tsagaan Belchir
- Yargis

== Miscellaneous ==
Lake Khövsgöl borders the sum to the north. Erkhel nuur was the site of an avian influenza outbreak in 2005.

== Literature ==
M.Nyamaa, Khövsgöl aimgiin lavlakh toli, Ulaanbaatar 2001, p. 14f
