= Carl Krebs =

Danish doctor, humanitarian aid worker and explorer (1889–1971)

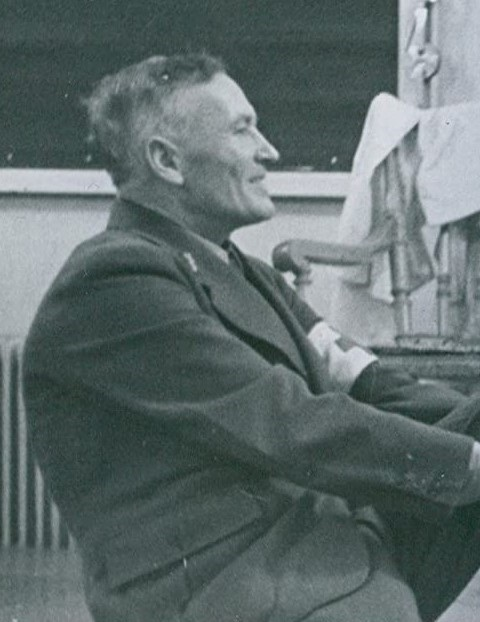

Personal information
- Full name: Carl Immanuel Krebs
- Born: 11 February 1889 Aarhus, Denmark
- Died: 15 May 1971 (aged 82) Slagelse, Denmark
- Relatives: Nathalie Krebs (sister)

Gymnastics career
- Discipline: Men's artistic gymnastics
- Country represented: Denmark
Medal record
Men's artistic gymnastics
Representing Denmark
Olympic Games
Bronze medal – third place	1912 Stockholm	Team, free system

Carl Immanuel Krebs (11 February 1889 – 15 May 1971) was a Danish medical doctor, humanitarian aid worker and explorer. In addition to his professional career, he competed at the 1912 Summer Olympics, winning a bronze medal.

== Early life and education ==
Krebs was born on 11 February 1889 in Aarhus. He was the third child of First Lieutenant (later Major General) Frederik Christian Krebs (1855–1930) and Johanne Margrethe Busch (1858–1911). He was also the brother of ceramicist Nathalie Krebs and the grandson of Dr. Frederik Christian Krebs (1814–1881) a physician, writer on political and social reforms, and editor of the Berlingske Tidende.

He graduated from the Metropolitanskole in 1907 and completed his medical studies in 1913. He was then a resident in the surgical department of St. Joseph's Hospital.

== Gymnastics career ==
As a student, he competed in the 1912 Summer Olympics as part of the Danish team that won the bronze medal in the men's free system team gymnastics event.

== Post-gymnastics career ==
In 1914, he joined the Danish Army, not as a medical officer but as a recruit, and was promoted to Second Lieutenant in the Royal Life Guards a year later. Krebs worked for the Danish Red Cross and the Danish Foreign Ministry in Russia from 1916 to 1920, monitoring conditions in Russian POW camps. While there, he participated in an expedition to Central Asia (Mongolia and Tannu Uriankhai), and in February 1918 was sent on a secret aid mission to Maria Feodorovna (Dagmar of Denmark) in Crimea, mother of the last Russian monarch, Emperor Nicholas II. In 1921 he was with the Danish Ambulance service in Poland during the Polish–Soviet War. In 1922, he returned to Russia as leader of the Danish Red Cross delegation in Fridtjof Nansen's efforts to alleviate the Russian Famine of 1921-22.

In 1922, Krebs organized and led an expedition to establish a farming, mining, and fur trading settlement near Erdenebulgan in the Khövsgöl province of northern Mongolia; however, the enterprise never prospered. The other expedition members, including Henning Haslund-Christensen, left by 1928, and Krebs remained to raise horses and practice medicine. Subject to increasing harassment by the communist authorities in the 1930s, he was eventually forced to leave in 1937. After his return to Denmark he published his memoir En Dansker i Mongoliet.

Krebs worked as a war surgeon in World War II, from 1939 to 1940 with the Danish Ambulance service in Finland and later from 1941 to 1943 with the Finnish Army. In 1940 he was employed by the (then neutral) United States at their Berlin Embassy to monitor conditions of Allied Prisoners held in German camps. In 1945, he served as Denmark's representative for the Red Cross in the evacuation of Danish and Norwegian prisoners in Germany with "the White Buses", a transport organization that brought Danish and Norwegian concentration camp prisoners from Germany to Sweden during the last months of World War II.

From 1950 to 1951 he led the second part of the 3rd Danish Central Asian Expedition, which included travelling through the Rupshu region of the Indian Himalayas. From 1952 to 1959 he served as a medical officer at the Danish naval base at Kangilinnguit (formerly Grønnedal) Greenland. During his stay on the island of New Britain from 1960 to 1961, he gathered material for New Britain: A Geomorphological Study in the Continental Drift (1961), which supported Alfred Wegener's then-controversial theory of continental drift. His final expedition to the Sula Islands of Indonesia was cut short for financial reasons. He died in 1971.

== Works ==
- Fra Mongoliet og Urjan-Chai, 1921
- En Dansker i Mongoliet, 1937
- New Britain: A Geomorphological Study in the Continental Drift, 1961
