= Tosontsengel =

Tosontsengel may refer to:

several Sums (districts) in different Aimags (provinces) in Mongolia

- Tosontsengel, Khövsgöl, a sum in Khövsgöl aimag
- Tosontsengel, Zavkhan, a sum in Zavkhan aimag
