= Rashaant, Khövsgöl =

District in Khövsgöl Province, Mongolia

Coordinates: 49°07′24″N 101°26′13″E

Rashaant District Рашаант сум ᠷᠠᠰᠢᠶ᠋ᠠᠨᠲᠤᠰᠤᠮᠤ
- District
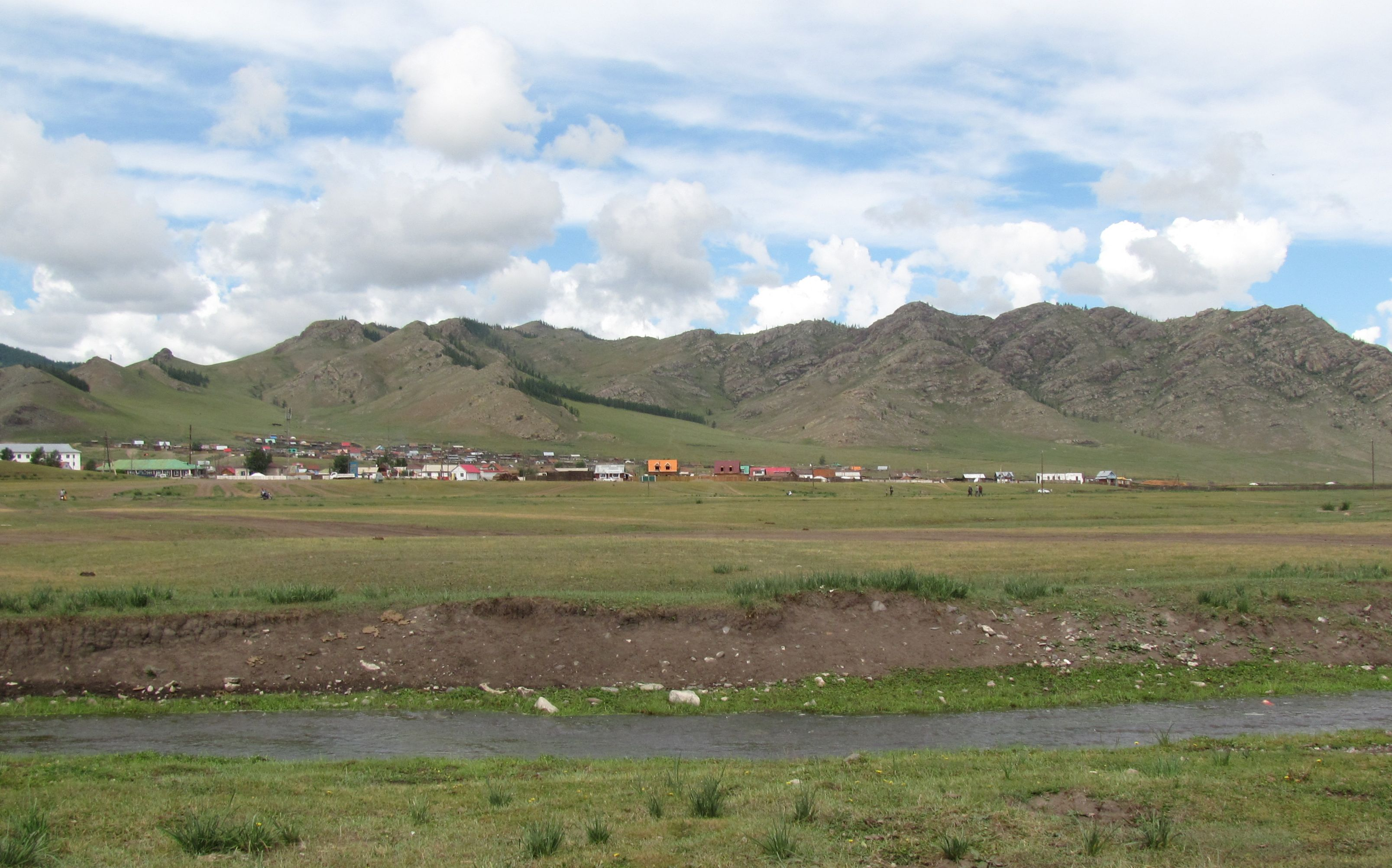
- Rashaant sum center, seen from the east

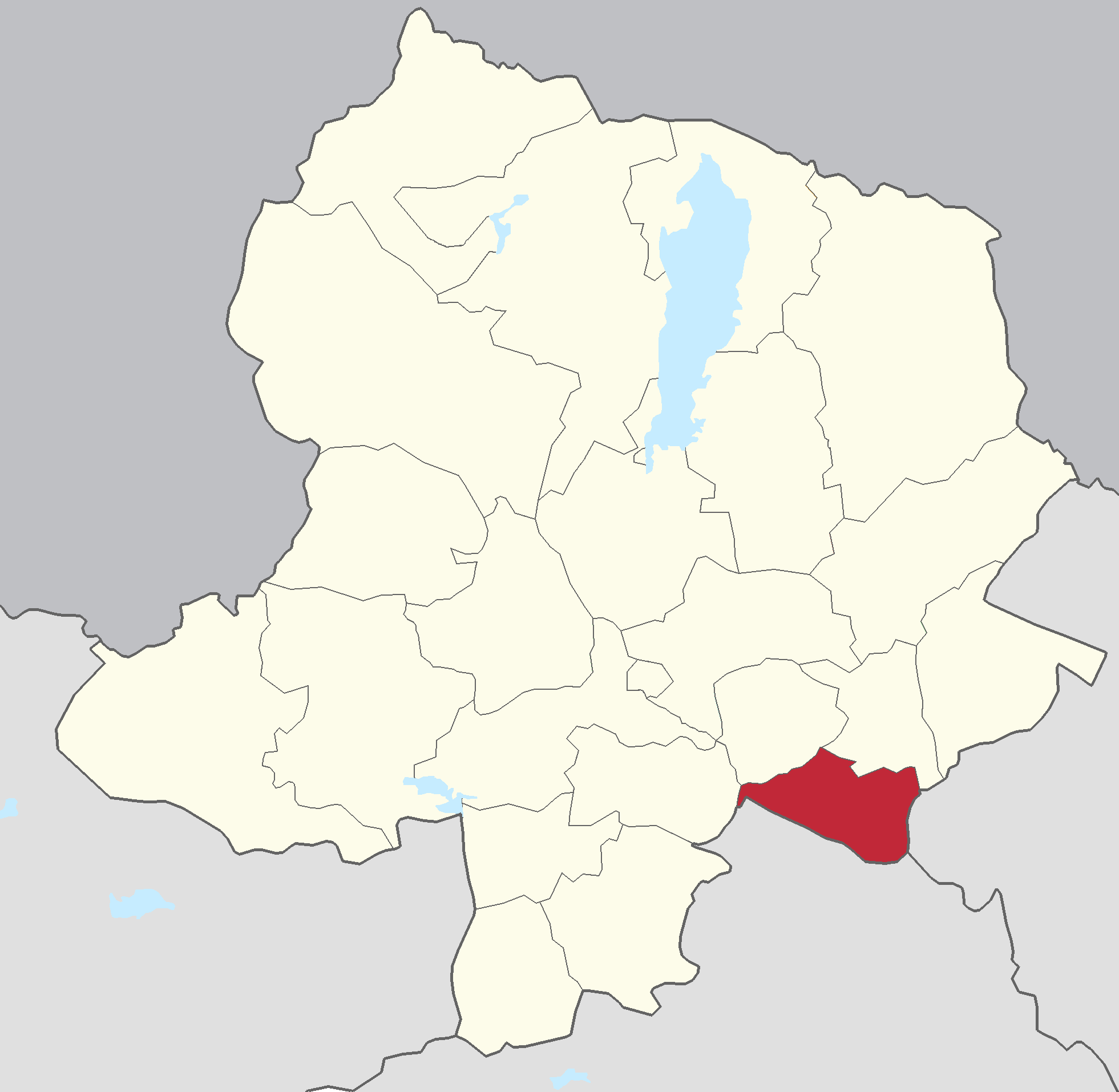
- Rashaant District in Khövsgöl Province
- Country: Mongolia
- Province: Khövsgöl Province
- Time zone: UTC+8 (UTC + 8)

Rashaant (Mongolian: Рашаант = in the spring) is a sum of Khövsgöl aimag. The area is about 1,980 km², of which 50 km² are farmland. In 2000, the sum had 3280 inhabitants. The town of Rashaant, the aimag center, is located in a high valley, 154 km southeast of Mörön and 518 kilometers from Ulaanbaatar and had 978 inhabitants in 2009.

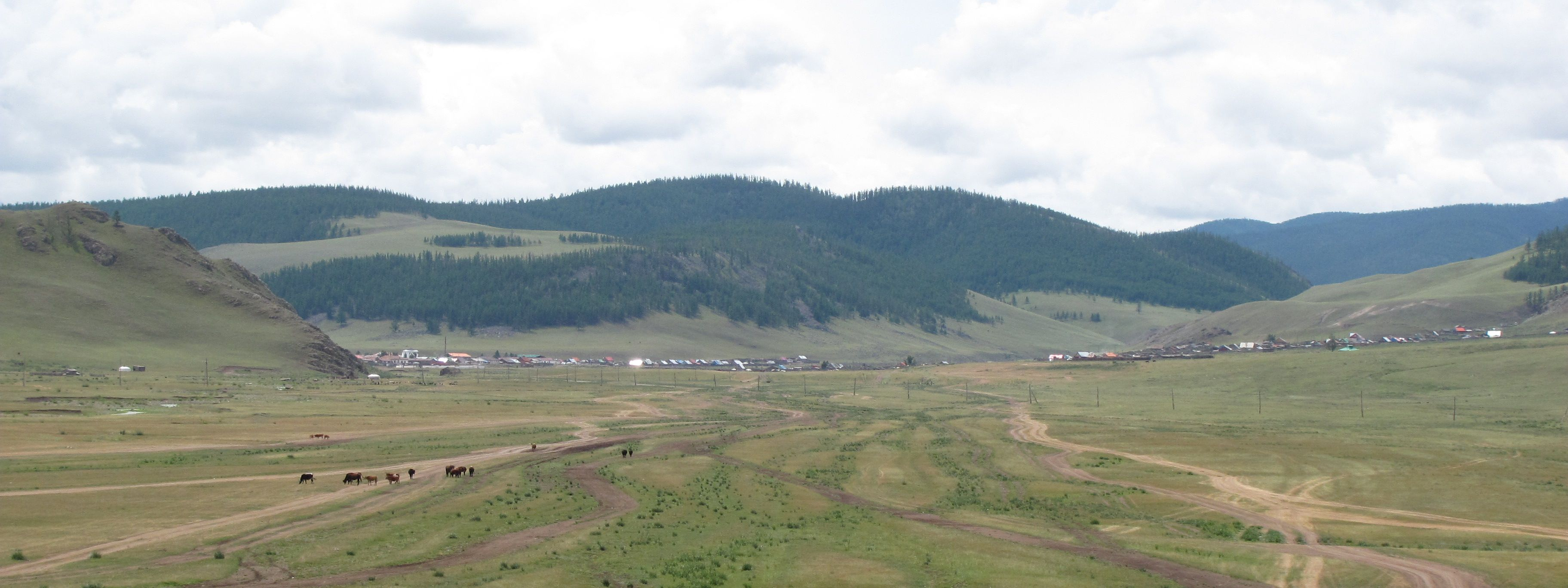
Rashaant Town, seen from the north

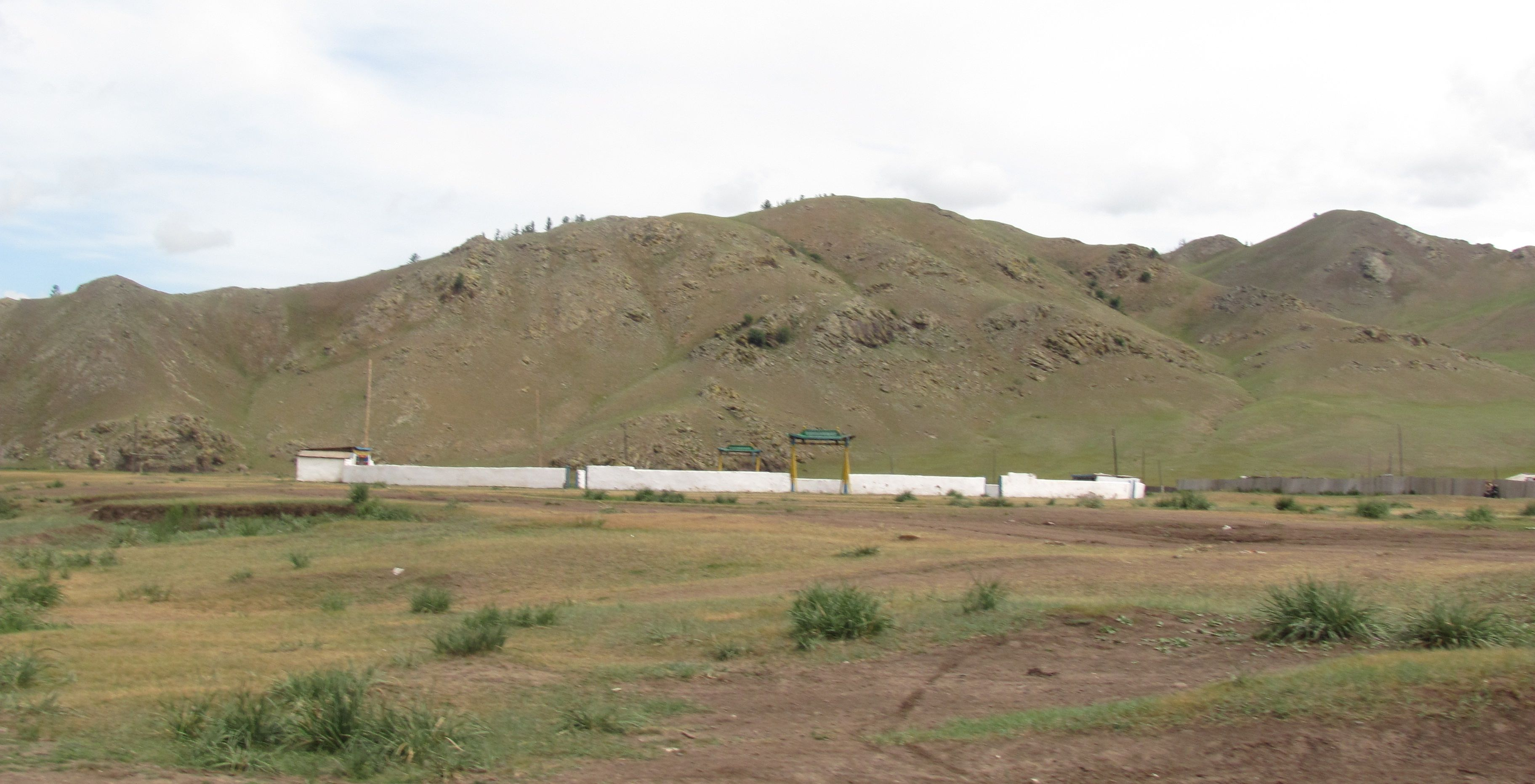
Rebuilt monastery in the Town of Rashaant

== History ==
The Rashaant sum was founded, together with the whole Khövsgöl aimag, in 1931. The sum center was placed near the Khyalganat monastery (often also referred to as Rashaantyn Khüree), which had been founded in 1915. In 1932, the monastery was the starting point of an armed rebellion that encompassed large parts of western Mongolia, and the sum center was burnt down. In 1933, the sum had about 2,400 inhabitants in 719 households, and about 47,000 heads of livestock. In 1955, Rashaant sum was united with Tarialan, but became separate again in 1959. The local negdel Ulaan Od (Red Star) was founded in 1952 and continued to exist after 1990 as a private farming company. After 1990, the monastery was rebuilt. It is in the northern part of Rashaant Town.

== Administrative divisions ==
The district is divided into five bags, which are:

- Enkh tal
- Ikh ats
- Taliin us
- Teel
- Tsengel

== Economy ==
In 2004, there were roughly 123,000 heads of livestock, among them 51,000 sheep, 55,000 goats, 8,900 cattle and yaks, and 8,200 horses, but no camels.

== Literature ==
M.Nyamaa, Khövsgöl aimgiin lavlakh toli, Ulaanbaatar 2001, p. 119f
