= Khankh, Khövsgöl =

District in Khövsgöl Province, Mongolia

Coordinates: 51°30′42″N 100°39′13″E

Khankh District Ханх сум ᠬᠠᠩᠬ᠎ᠠᠰᠤᠮᠤ
- District
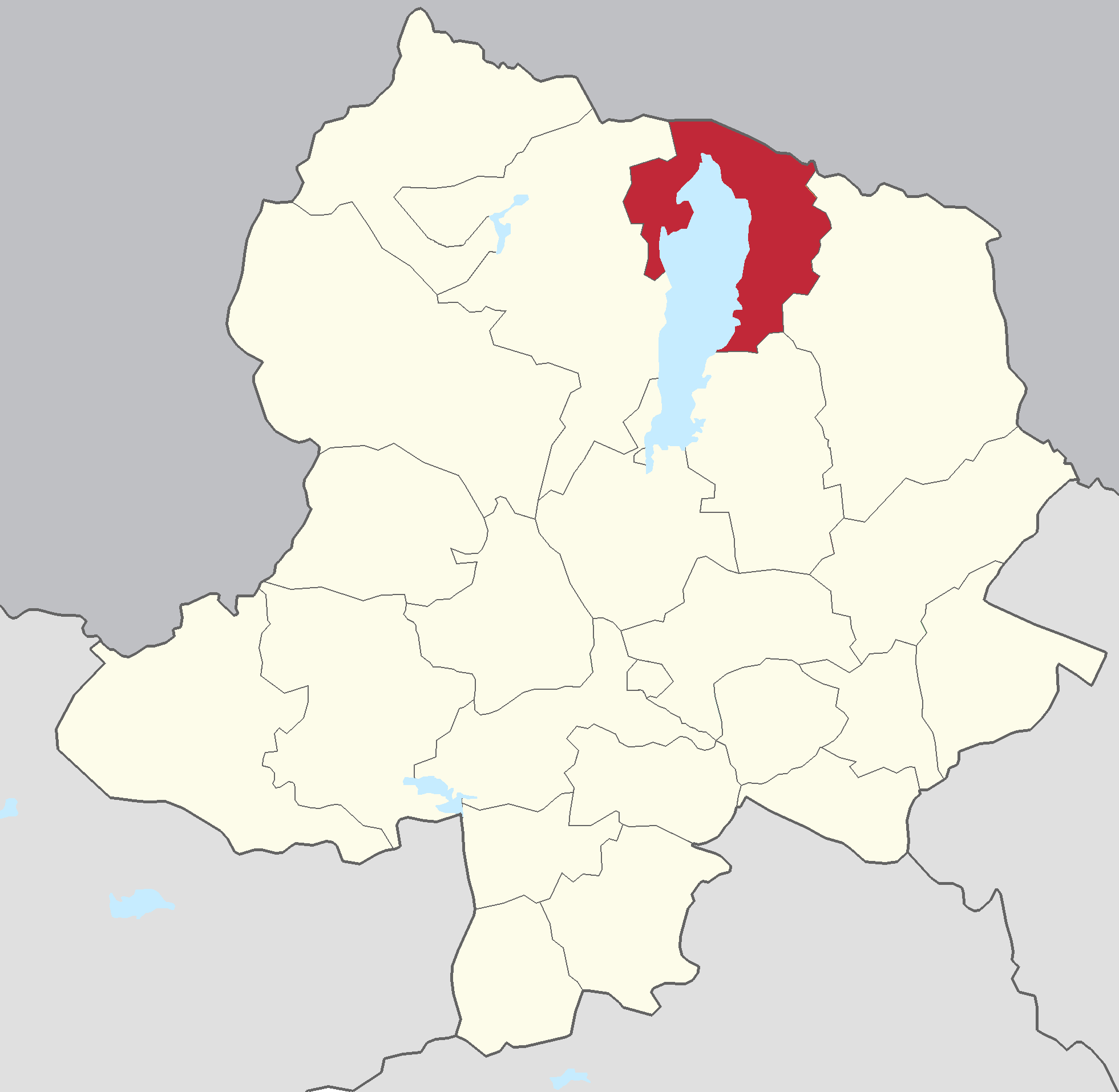
- Khankh District in Khövsgöl Province
- Country: Mongolia
- Province: Khövsgöl Province
- Time zone: UTC+8 (UTC + 8)

Khankh (Mongolian: Ханх; "great bay") is a sum of Khövsgöl aimag. The area is about 5,500 km^{2} (2,100 mi^{2}). In 2000, the sum had a population of 2,140 inhabitants. The center, officially named Turt (Mongolian: Турт), is situated on the shore of Lake Khövsgöl, 280 km (170 mi) north of Mörön, 1,020 km (630 mi) from Ulaanbaatar, and 22 km (14 mi) from the Khankh/Mondy border crossing to Russia.

== History ==
The Khankh sum was founded, together with the whole Khövsgöl aimag, in 1931. In 1933, it had about 1,000 inhabitants in 346 households, and about 13,200 heads of livestock. In 1955, the sum was dissolved, some parts were joined to Chandmani-Öndör, the rest became Turt khoroo. In 1959, the sum was reestablished, but became part of Renchinlkhümbe in 1978. In 1994, it was reestablished again. In 1956, the local Khövsgöl Dolgio negdel was founded.

== Geography ==
The sum borders Lake Khövsgöl. The aimags highest mountain, Mönkhsaridag, is located at the border to Russia.

== Administrative divisions ==
The district is divided into four bags, which are:

- Bayasgalant
- Khoroo
- Turag
- Turt

== Economy ==
In 2004, there were roughly 26,000 heads of livestock, among them 6,600 sheep, 7,500 goats, 8,900 cattle and yaks, 2,600 horses, and 6 camels. In 2000, the sum center was connected to the Russian power grid.

== Literature ==
M.Nyamaa, Khövsgöl aimgiin lavlakh toli, Ulaanbaatar 2001, p. 156f
