= Ikh-Uul, Khövsgöl =

District in Khövsgöl Province, Mongolia

Coordinates: 49°26′32″N 101°28′20″E

Ikh-Uul District Их-Уул сум ᠶᠡᠬᠡᠠᠭᠤᠯᠠᠰᠤᠮᠤ
- District
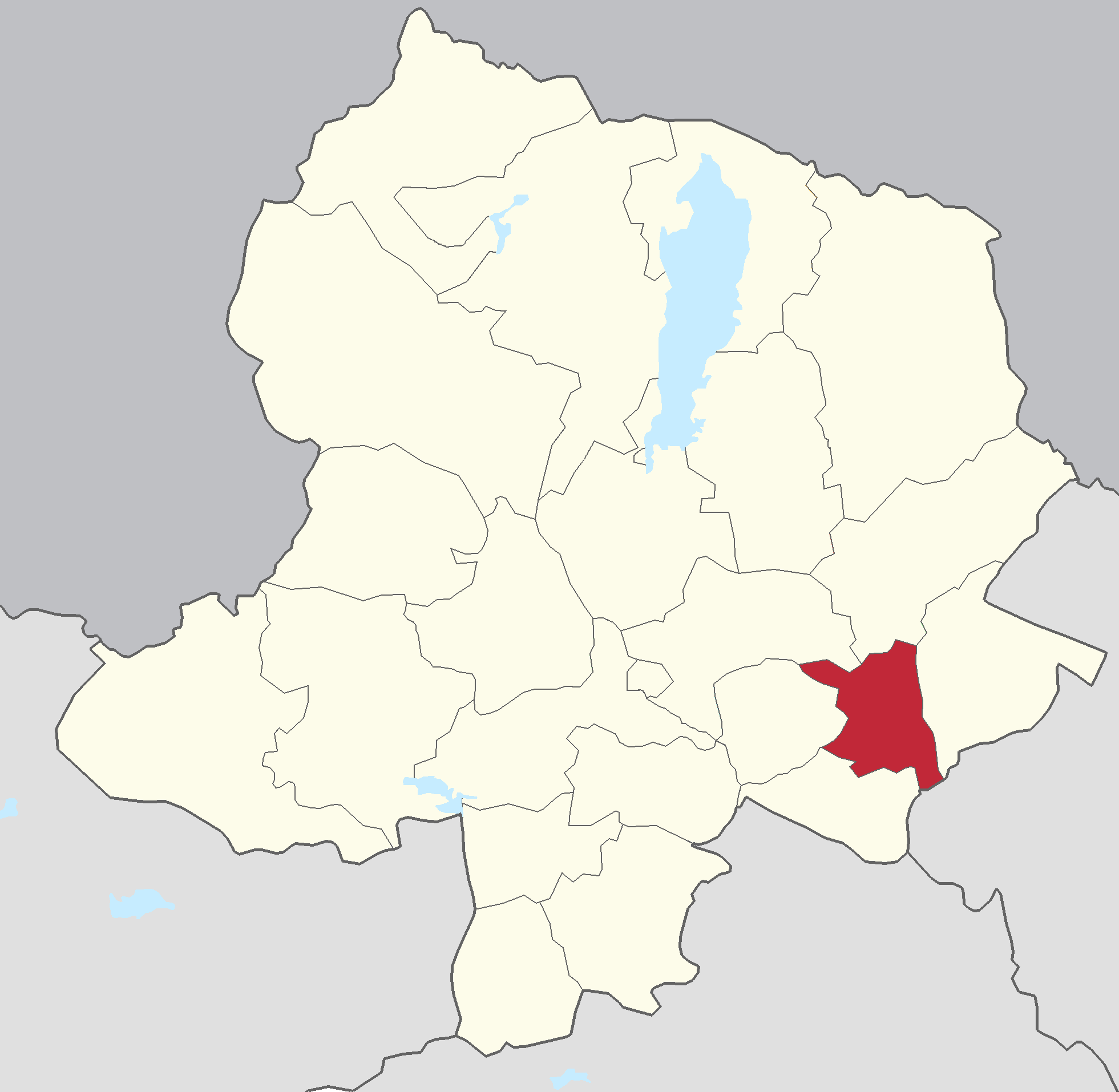
- Ikh-Uul District in Khövsgöl Province
- Country: Mongolia
- Province: Khövsgöl Province
- Time zone: UTC+8 (UTC + 8)

Ikh-Uul (Mongolian: Их-Уул, literally "great mountain") is a sum of Khövsgöl aimag. The area is about 2,020 km², of which 1,350 km² are pasture and about 11 km² are farmland. In 2000, the sum had 3959 inhabitants, mainly Khalkha and Khotgoid. The center, officially named Selenge (Mongolian: Сэлэнгэ), is situated close to the Selenge river, 112 km east of Mörön and 589 kilometers from Ulaanbaatar.

== History ==
The Ikh-Uul sum was founded, together with the whole Khövsgöl aimag, in 1931. In 1933, it had about 2,700 inhabitants in 718 households, and about 68,000 heads of livestock. In 1956 it was united with Tarialan, but became separated again in 1959. The local negdel, called Saruul-Amidral and something of a model negdel, was founded in 1958.

== Administrative divisions ==
The district is divided into five bags, which are:

- Asgat
- Ikh-Uul
- Mandal
- Selenge
- Shivee

== Economy ==
In 2004, there were roughly 140,000 heads of livestock, among them 49,000 sheep, 73,000 goats, 10,000 cattle and yaks, 8,800 horses, and 46 camels. In 1997, the sum center was connected to the Mongolian central power grid.

== Literature ==
M.Nyamaa, Khövsgöl aimgiin lavlakh toli, Ulaanbaatar 2001, p. 90f
