= Ikh-Uul =

Ikh-Uul is the name of two sums (districts) in Mongolia:

- Ikh-Uul, Khövsgöl
- Ikh-Uul, Zavkhan
