= Mankhan Uul mine =

Mine in Khövsgöl, Mongolia

- Location: Khövsgöl, Mongolia
- Products: Phosphates

The Mankhan Uul mine is a large mine in Khövsgöl Province, Mongolia. Ongilog Lake represents one of the largest phosphates reserve in Mongolia having estimated reserves of 1.6 billion tonnes of ore grading 35% P_{2}O_{5}.
