= Galt, Khövsgöl =

District in Khövsgöl Province, Mongolia

Coordinates: 48°46′16″N 99°52′34″E

Galt District Галт сум ᠭᠠᠯᠲᠤᠰᠤᠮᠤ
- District
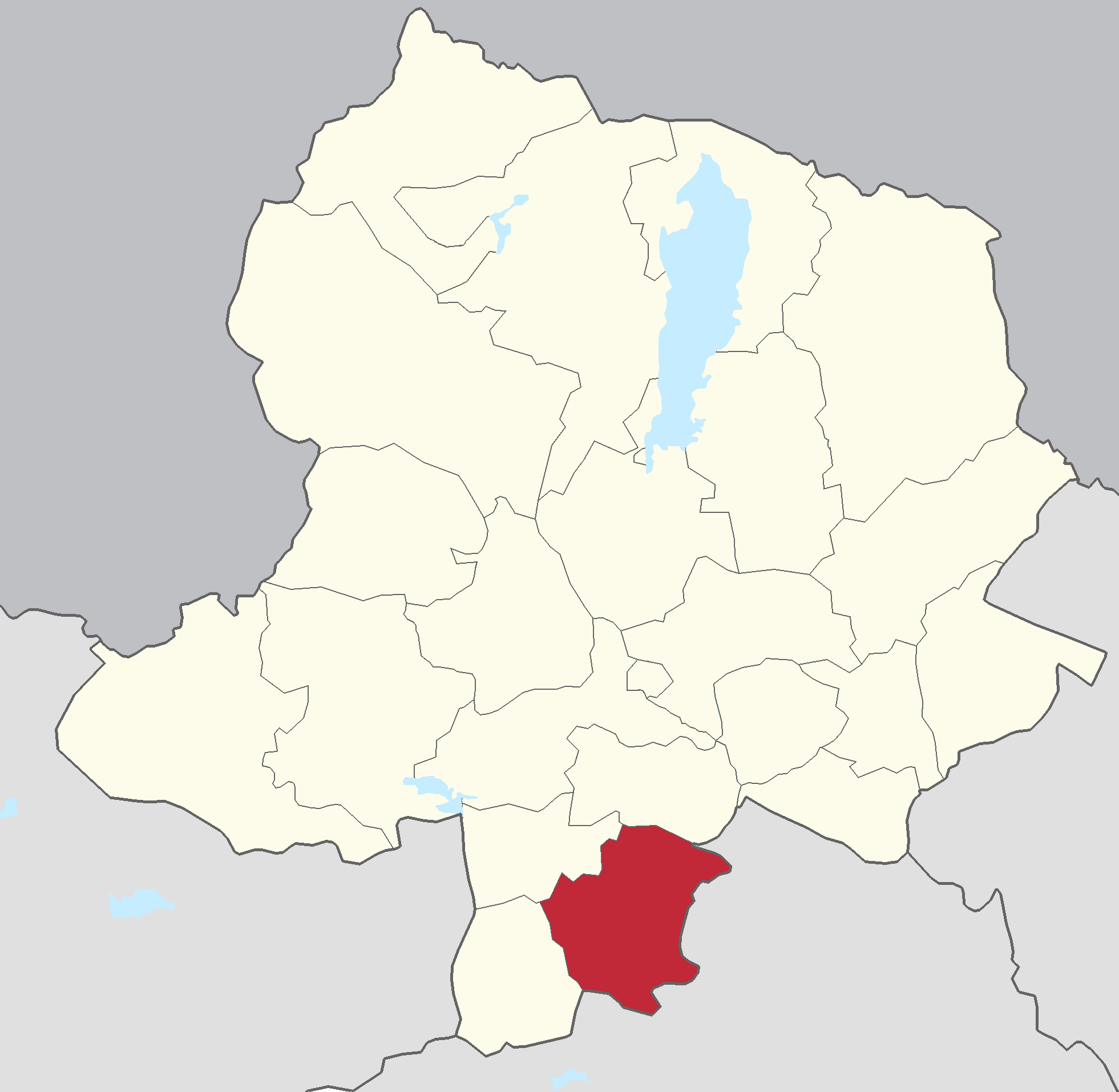
- Country: Mongolia
- Province: Khövsgöl Province
- Time zone: UTC+8 (UTC + 8)

Galt (Mongolian: Галт, lit. 'with fire') is a sum (district) of Khövsgöl aimag (Khövsgöl Province). The area is about 3,600 km^{2}. In 2000, the district had 5328 inhabitants. The center, officially named Ider (Mongolian: Идэр), is located 168 km south of the city of Mörön and 837 kilometers from the capital city, Ulaanbaatar.

== History ==
The Galt sum was founded, under the name Ider and as part of Arkhangai aimag, in 1931. In 1933, it had about 2,500 inhabitants in 687 households, and about 72,000 heads of livestock. In 1942, it became part of Khövsgöl aimag, in 1956 it was joined to Chandmani sum, in 1959 it was reestablished under the name Galt. In 1963, the Zürkh sum became part of Galt. Between 1956 and around 1990, Galt was the seat of the Ideriin Undraa negdel.

== Administrative divisions ==
The district is divided into five bags, which are:

- Galt
- Khujirt
- Nukht
- Rashaant
- Zurkh

== Economy ==
In 2004, there were roughly 183,000 heads of livestock, among them 83,000 sheep, 78,000 goats, 10,000 cattle and yaks, 11,000 horses, and 64 camels.

== Interesting Place ==
About 25 km south of the sum center is a warm spring known as Salbartyn Rashaan.

== Notable natives ==
- Dambajavyn Tsend–Ayuush, judoka

== Literature ==
M.Nyamaa, Khövsgöl aimgiin lavlakh toli, Ulaanbaatar 2001, p. 45f
