= Chandmani-Öndör, Khövsgöl =

District in Khövsgöl Province, Mongolia

Coordinates: 50°28′30″N 100°55′55″E

Chandmani-Ondor soum Чандмань-Өндөр сум ᠴᠢᠨᠳᠠᠮᠠᠨᠢᠥᠨᠳᠦᠷᠰᠤᠮᠤ
- District
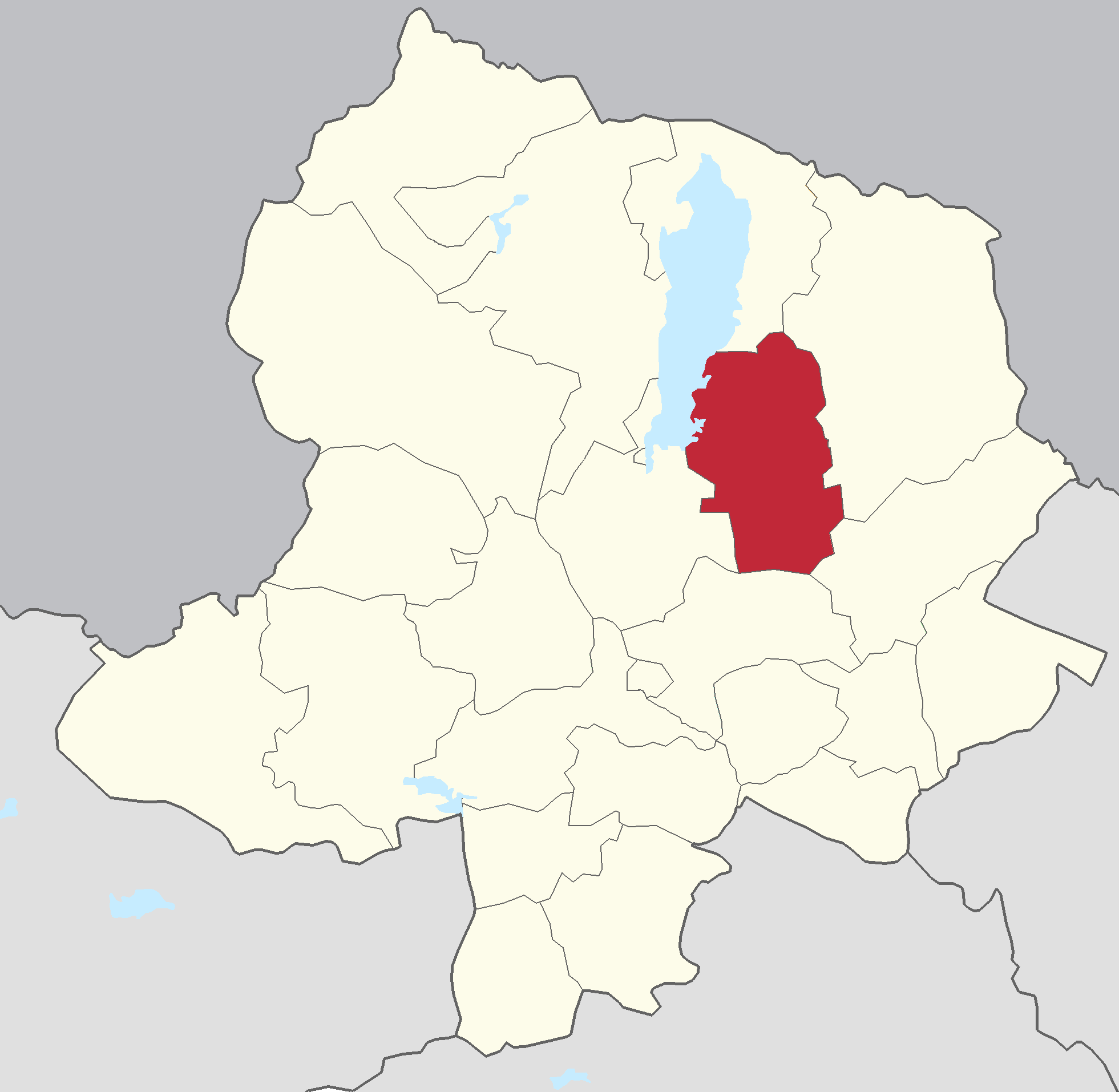
- Chandmani-Öndör District in Khövsgöl Province
- Country: Mongolia
- Province: Khövsgöl Province
- Time zone: UTC+8 (UTC + 8)

Chandmani-Ondor (Mongolian: Чандмань-Өндөр) is a sum of Khövsgöl aimag. The area is about 4,490 km^{2}. In 2000, the sum had 3036 inhabitants, including some Uriankhai. The center, officially named Khukhuu (Mongolian: Хөхөө) is located 190 km north-northeast of Mörön and 758 kilometers from Ulaanbaatar.

== History ==
The Chandmani-Öndör sum was founded, together with the whole Khövsgöl aimag, in 1931. In 1933, it had about 2,300 inhabitants in 816 households, and about 42,000 heads of livestock. In 1956 it was joined with Tsagaan-Üür, but became separate again in 1959. From 1952 to 1990, Chandmani-Öndör was the seat of the Leninii aldar negdel.

== Administrative divisions ==
The district is divided into five bags, which are:

- Khairkhan Tolgoi
- Khukhuu
- Shivert
- Ulaan Asga
- Yolgos

== Economy ==
In 2004, there were roughly 41,000 heads of livestock, among them 10,000 sheep, 13,000 goats, 14,000 cattle and yaks, and 4,100 horses, but no camels.

== Interesting Places ==
Some locals believe that Alan Goa, one of the more prominent ancestors of Genghis Khan mentioned in the Secret History of the Mongols, hails from the Arig gol river that runs through Chandmani-Öndör. A statue of her has been erected close to the river in 1992.

== Literature ==
M.Nyamaa, Khövsgöl aimgiin lavlakh toli, Ulaanbaatar 2001, p. 204f
