= Henning Haslund-Christensen =

Danish travel writer and anthropologist (1896–1948)

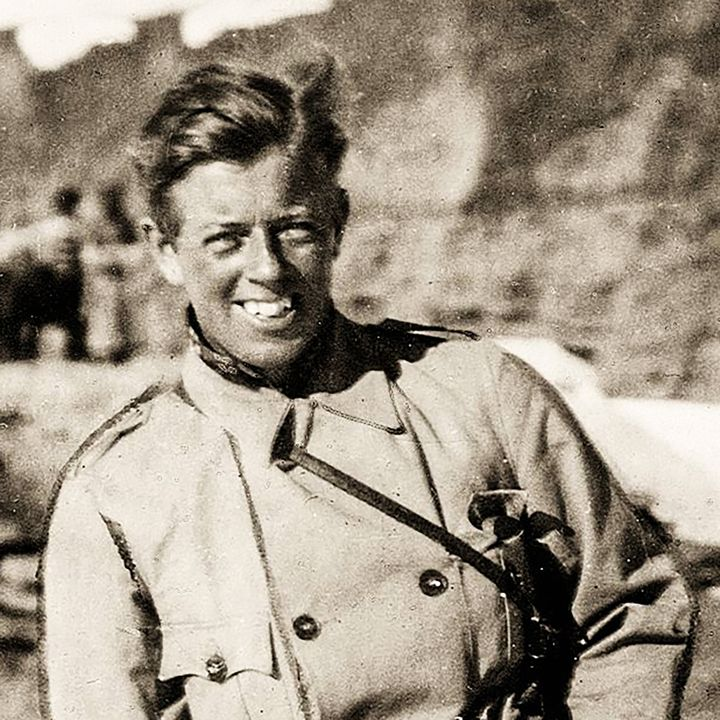
- Born: 31 August 1896; Copenhagen, Denmark
- Died: 13 September 1948 (aged 52); Kabul, Afghanistan
- Occupations: Travel writer, Explorer, Anthropologist
- Spouse: Inga Margit Lindström
- Writing career
- Pen name: Haslund
- Genre: Travel writing,

Henning Haslund-Christensen (31 August 1896 – 13 September 1948) was a Danish travel writer and anthropologist.

== Life ==
He was born in Copenhagen on 31 August 1896, and graduated from the Østersøgades Gymnasium in Copenhagen. He enrolled at the Army Academy and in 1918 was appointed second lieutenant in the Danish Army. In 1932, he married Inga Margit Lindström, daughter of C.F.J. Lindström of the Royal Swedish Navy and an Adjutant to H.M. the King of Sweden. He died of heart failure in Kabul on 13 September 1948.

== Expeditions ==
In the early 1920s, Haslund joined a group led by a Danish physician named Carl Krebs, who aimed to establish a dairy farm in northern Mongolia, close to the Russian border. They travelled via China and Ulaanbaatar, and established themselves in what is today Erdenebulgan sum in Khövsgöl province. However, the dairy farm project failed due to Mongolia coming under stronger Soviet influence, and Haslund left Outer Mongolia in the mid-1920s.

Fascinated by the Mongol way of life, Haslund remained in Inner Mongolia for the following years, e.g. joining Sven Hedin for the Sino-Swedish Scientific Expedition of the late 1920s. It was during this time he reportedly visited Asralt Khairkhan, where he first encountered the local minority religion Pi Shashin.

After the war, Haslund organised and led the Third Danish Expedition to Central Asia, which lasted six years. A first team, consisting of anthropologists, botanists, geographers, and zoologists would work during 1948 and 1949 in Afghanistan, from Nuristan in the east to Herat in the west, under his leadership. This would extend scientific knowledge to the south-east of the Pamirs and Iran explored respectively by Ole Olufsen in 1896-7 and C. G. Feilberg in 1936. Unfortunately, Haslund's death in 1948 left the Expedition leaderless and the expedition members finished their work as best they could. A new leader was appointed in 1950 but the rest of the plan for the expedition was never accomplished due to the political situation from 1950 onwards.

== See also ==
- Hans Kaarsberg

== Publications ==
- Tents in Mongolia (Yabonah): Adventures and Experiences Among the Nomads of Central Asia, by Henning Haslund-Christensen; Elizabeth Sprigge; Claude Napier. New York: E.P. Dutton & Co., [1934] (later also reprinted under the title In Secret Mongolia)
- Men and Gods in Mongolia (Zayagan), by Henning Haslund-Christensen; Elizabeth Sprigge; Claude Napier. New York: E.P. Dutton & co., [1935]
- The Music of the Mongols: Part I, Eastern Mongolia. 7. by Henning Haslund-Christensen. Stockholm: Tryckeri aktiebolaget Thule, 1943.
- Mongol Costumes: Researches on the Garments Collected by the First and Second Danish Central Asian Expeditions under the Leadership of Henning Haslund-Christensen, 1936-37 and 1938-39, by Henny Harald Hansen. København: I kommission hos Gyldendal, 1950.
- Mongolian Journey, by Henning Haslund-Christensen. London: Routledge & K. Paul, [1949].

== Sources ==
- Classic Travel Books website: http://www.classictravelbooks.com/authors/henning.htm Accessed 2012-07-10
- His Obituary in the Journal of the Royal Central Asian Society, Volume 36, Issue 1, 1949 available at http://www.tandfonline.com/doi/abs/10.1080/03068374908731307?journalCode=raaf19 Accessed 2012-07-07
- "The Third Danish Expedition to Central Asia: Its Work in the Himalayas", The Himalayan Journal 18. Authored by H.R.H. Prince Peter of Greece and Denmark, published in 1954.
