= Khatgal, Khövsgöl =

District in Khövsgöl Province, Mongolia

Coordinates: 50°26′22″N 100°09′42″E

Khatgal Хатгал ᠬᠠᠳᠭᠠᠯ
- Village
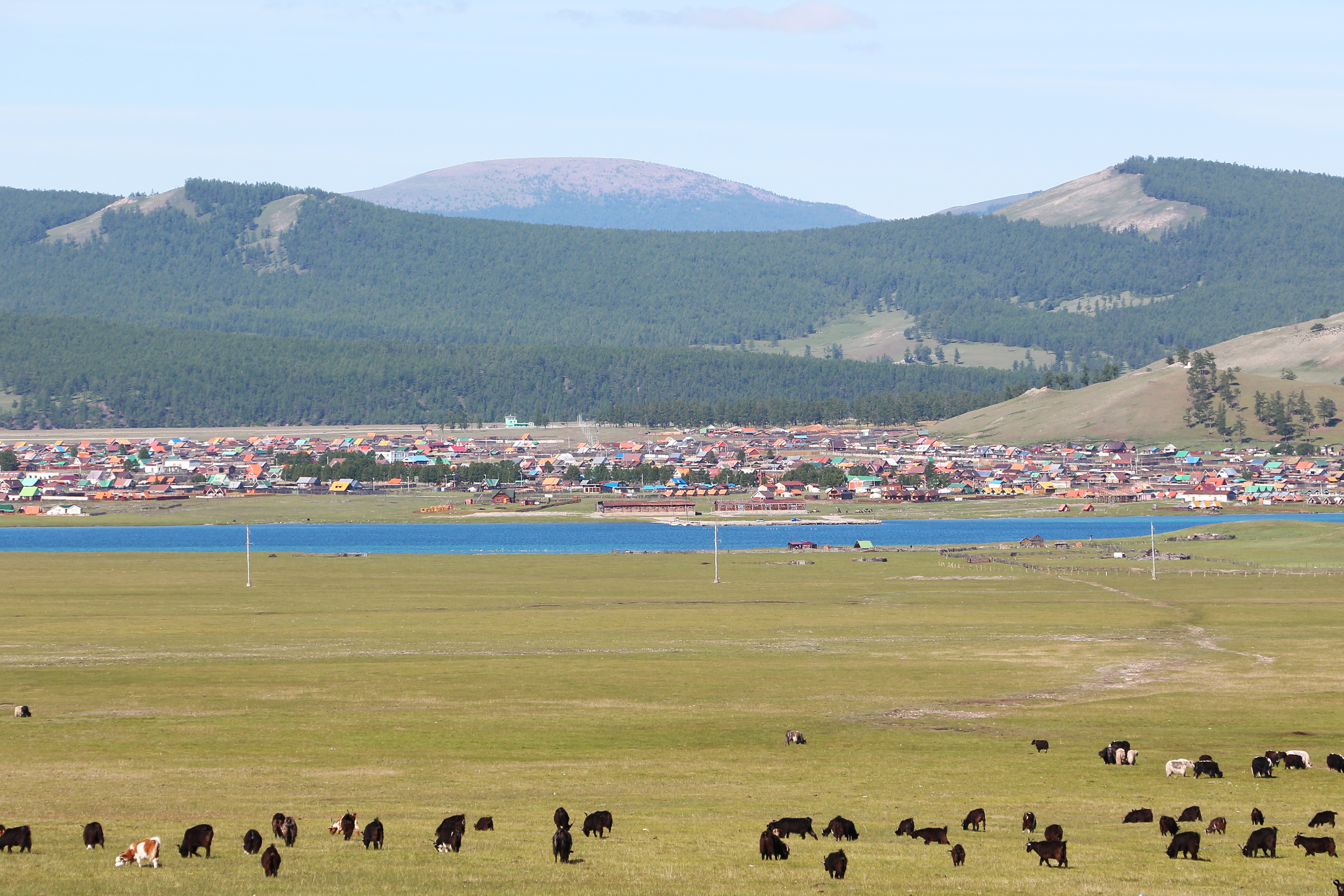
- Khatgal in 2023
- Interactive map of Khatgal
- Country: Mongolia
- Province: Khövsgöl Province
- District: Alag-Erdene
- Time zone: UTC+8 (Asia/Ulaanbaatar)
- Website: khatgal.khs.gov.mn

Khatgal (Mongolian: Хатгал, ᠬᠠᠳᠭᠠᠯ) is a village in Mongolia on the southern tip of Lake Khövsgöl. It has an airstrip, a small port, a school, and a post office. There is a wooden bridge nearby over the Eg River.

== History ==
Khatgal was founded in 1727 as a camp of the Mongolian watch post system. By 1910, a small settlement had formed, mainly through trade with Russia. In 1914 a telegraph connection was established from the Russian border town of Mondy to Uliastai via Khatgal, and in 1921, about 150 Russian settlers lived in Khatgal.

In the same year, Khatgal became an administrative center in the region. In 1931 it became the center of the newly established Khövsgöl Province, but shortly afterwards in 1933 the administration moved to Mörön.

The town had about 7000 inhabitants and a power plant in 1990, but the dry-up of transport routes and the closure of a local wool factory have led to high migration rates, leaving only 3,756 inhabitants in 1994 and 2,498 inhabitants in the 2000 census. The latest official population estimate was 2,796 as of 2006. Khatgal also lost its status as a town and is now administratively part of the Alag-Erdene Sum. In 2007, Khatgal was connected to the Mongolian central power grid and to cell phone services.

State Great Khural member and former health minister Lamjavyn Gündalai was born in Khatgal.

== Economy ==
Due to Khatgal's status as an access point to campsites along the west coast of Lake Khövsgöl, tourism has become one of the largest sectors of the town's economy. This is amplified by the construction of an airport in the town in 2007. MIAT Mongolian Airlines lists the town on its domestic schedule.

== Climate ==
Khatgal experiences a subarctic climate (Köppen Dwc) with very long, very dry, frigid winters and short, cool, relatively wet summers. Sunshine is abundant year-round and is especially high during the winter for a location above the 50th parallel north.

Climate data for Khatgal, elevation 1,666 m (5,466 ft), (1991–2020 normals, extremes 1963–present)
Month	Jan	Feb	Mar	Apr	May	Jun	Jul	Aug	Sep	Oct	Nov	Dec	Year
Record high °C (°F)	2.0 (35.6)	6.6 (43.9)	15.5 (59.9)	26.0 (78.8)	29.0 (84.2)	30.0 (86.0)	31.8 (89.2)	33.6 (92.5)	27.6 (81.7)	24.0 (75.2)	13.0 (55.4)	6.9 (44.4)	33.6 (92.5)
Mean daily maximum °C (°F)	−15.8 (3.6)	−10.3 (13.5)	−1.8 (28.8)	7.0 (44.6)	13.4 (56.1)	17.9 (64.2)	19.8 (67.6)	18.2 (64.8)	13.5 (56.3)	5.3 (41.5)	−5.2 (22.6)	−13.0 (8.6)	4.1 (39.4)
Daily mean °C (°F)	−23.3 (−9.9)	−19.5 (−3.1)	−10.7 (12.7)	1.0 (33.8)	5.2 (41.4)	10.6 (51.1)	13.2 (55.8)	11.4 (52.5)	5.3 (41.5)	−2.8 (27.0)	−12.4 (9.7)	−19.7 (−3.5)	−3.5 (25.8)
Mean daily minimum °C (°F)	−29.4 (−20.9)	−27.1 (−16.8)	−19.0 (−2.2)	−8.7 (16.3)	−2.9 (26.8)	3.3 (37.9)	7.1 (44.8)	5.1 (41.2)	−1.7 (28.9)	−9.5 (14.9)	−18.7 (−1.7)	−25.5 (−13.9)	−10.6 (12.9)
Record low °C (°F)	−49 (−56)	−45.0 (−49.0)	−40 (−40)	−28.1 (−18.6)	−19.5 (−3.1)	−8.0 (17.6)	−4.7 (23.5)	−7.0 (19.4)	−22.5 (−8.5)	−33.0 (−27.4)	−40 (−40)	−42.8 (−45.0)	−49.0 (−56.2)
Average precipitation mm (inches)	1.0 (0.04)	4.2 (0.17)	2.8 (0.11)	10.1 (0.40)	16.6 (0.65)	51.4 (2.02)	94.4 (3.72)	83.1 (3.27)	32.3 (1.27)	11.8 (0.46)	3.5 (0.14)	2.7 (0.11)	313.9 (12.36)
Average precipitation days (≥ 1.0 mm)	0.6	0.3	0.8	2.0	3.4	7.5	11.4	9.5	5.6	2.4	1.4	0.4	45.3
Mean monthly sunshine hours	184.0	204.9	269.6	277.6	309.9	290.6	264.5	258.7	242.6	224.0	176.5	160.7	2,863.6
Source 1: Pogoda.ru.net
Source 2: NOAA (precipitation days, sun 1963–1990)
