= Alan Gua =

Mongol semi-mythical clan princess

- Princess of The Mongol Khori Tümed Tribe
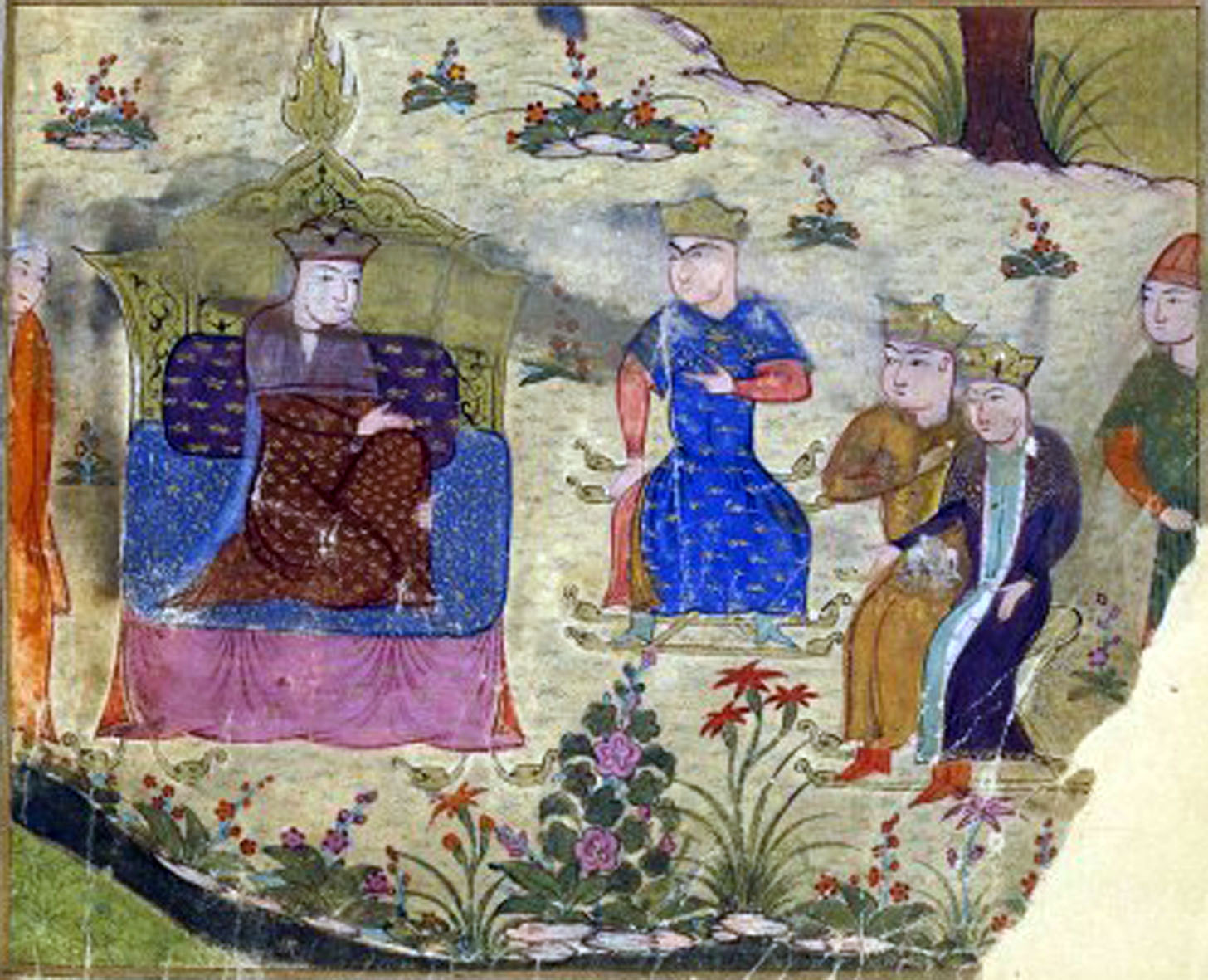
- Alan Gua and her sons, from Jami' al-tawarikh, by Rashid-al-Din Hamadani
- Born: between mid-9th Centuries (Present Mongolia)
- Died: early-10th Centuries (Present Mongolia)
- Husband: Dobun Mergen (later remarried to Bayad servant)
- Children: Begünütei; Belgünütei; Bukha Khatagi; Bukhatu-Salji; Bodonchar Munkhag
- House: Khori Tümeds
- Father: Qorilartai Mergen
- Mother: Bargujin Gua
- Religion: Tengrism

Alan Gua (Mongolian: Алун гуа, Alun gua, lit. "Alun the Beauty". Gua or Guva/Quwa means beauty in Mongolian born mid 9th Centuries – died early 10th Centuries) was a Mongolian Clan Princess and semi-mythical figure from The Secret History of the Mongols, as she was heavily mythologized as well as few parts of histories, she was eleven generations after the greyish white wolf and the red doe, and eleven generations before Genghis Khan. According to sources of The Secret History of the Mongols, Alan Gua was daughter of a Qorilartai Mergen who was the Chief of a Khori Tümeds Clan, and his wife Bargujin Gua, the daughter of a Barqudai Mergen, a man who was a Lord of the Köl Barquǰin Clan of Lowland.

Her five sons are described as the ancestors of the various Mongol clans. (That is, the Dörvöd are said to have been the descendants of Alan Gua's brother-in-law, Duva Sokhor, and the origins of the Khori-Tumed and Uriankhai are not explained at all.) She also figures in the Central Asian version of the parable of the five arrows, known in Western sources as The Old Man and his Sons.

== Secret History of the Mongols ==
The Secret History says that Alan Gua's clan was originally from the area of the Tumed, and moved to the Burkhan Khaldun when their hunting grounds were fenced off. Alan Gua was first spotted by Duva Sokhor, and later married to Duva Sokhor's brother, Dobun Mergen.

=== Five arrows ===
Alan Gua had two sons (Begünütei and Belgünütei) during the lifetime of Dobun Mergen, and three more (Bukha Khatagi, Bukhatu-Salji and Bodonchar Munkhag) after her husband's death. This caused her two older sons to suspect the three younger sons were fathered by an Uriankhai servant.

Hearing of these suspicions, Alan Gua summoned her five sons for a meal, then gave each of them one arrow and asked them each to break it. Next she made a bundle of five arrows and asked them to break it, and they could not, showing them the power of unity: a lesson Hogelun later discussed with her own sons.

=== The glittering visitor ===
Alan Gua's explanation for the conception of her three younger sons is the visit of a glittering visitor, who come through her yurt's roof opening each night and left each morning by crawling on the sun- or moonbeams "like a yellow dog". She concluded that the younger sons must be children of heaven and that it was therefore inappropriate to compare them to ordinary people. Her older sons suspected that their family's Bayad servant was the likely father. She advised her five sons that if they tried to stay on their own, they would be broken like the five arrows. But if they stuck together like the bundle of five arrows, nothing could harm them. Therefore, the so-called "Nilun" Mongols might be the descendant of Bayad tribesmen who had sex with Alan, it is more than likely that Alan has remarried secretly to the Bayad servant and gave birth to what would later become "Nilun Mongols". Due to the favoritism, Alan Gua is able to use the religions to manipulate her sons who are Dobun Mergen's descendants into believing the illegitimate "Nilun" Mongols are the descendant of gods. The descendants of Dobun have therefore become the "Dilegun?" or "Commoners".

== Statue ==
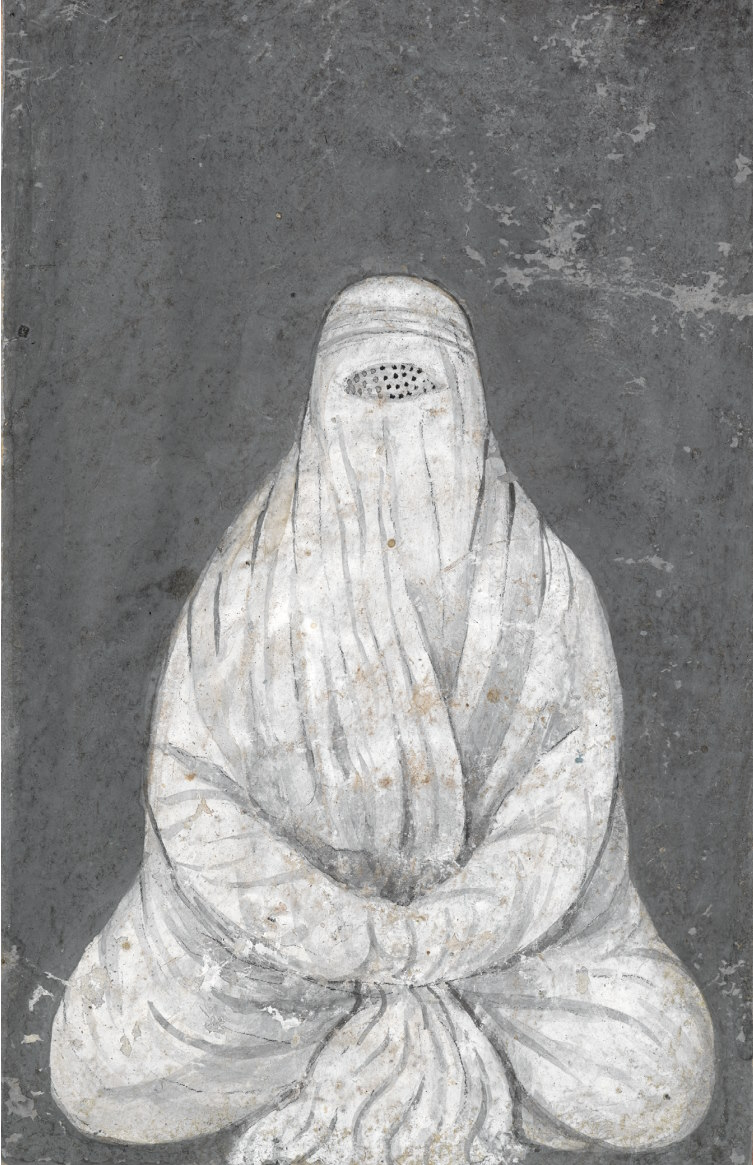
Portrait of Alan Qo’a in a 19th-century manuscript of the Muʿizz al-ansab. British Library, Or. 467.

The Secret History states that Alan Gua's clan is from a place called Arig usun (= pure water), and some Mongolian authors believe that this refers to the Arig gol in Mongolian Khövsgöl aimag. A statue of her, three metres high, has been erected at the river in 1992, at the confluence with the Khökhöö gol and twelve kilometres from the center of Chandmani-Öndör sum.
