= Tosontsengel, Khövsgöl =

District in Khövsgöl Province, Mongolia

Coordinates: 49°28′30″N 100°53′37″E

Tosontsengel District Тосонцэнгэл сум ᠲᠣᠰᠤᠨᠴᠡᠩᠭᠡᠯᠰᠤᠮᠤ
- District
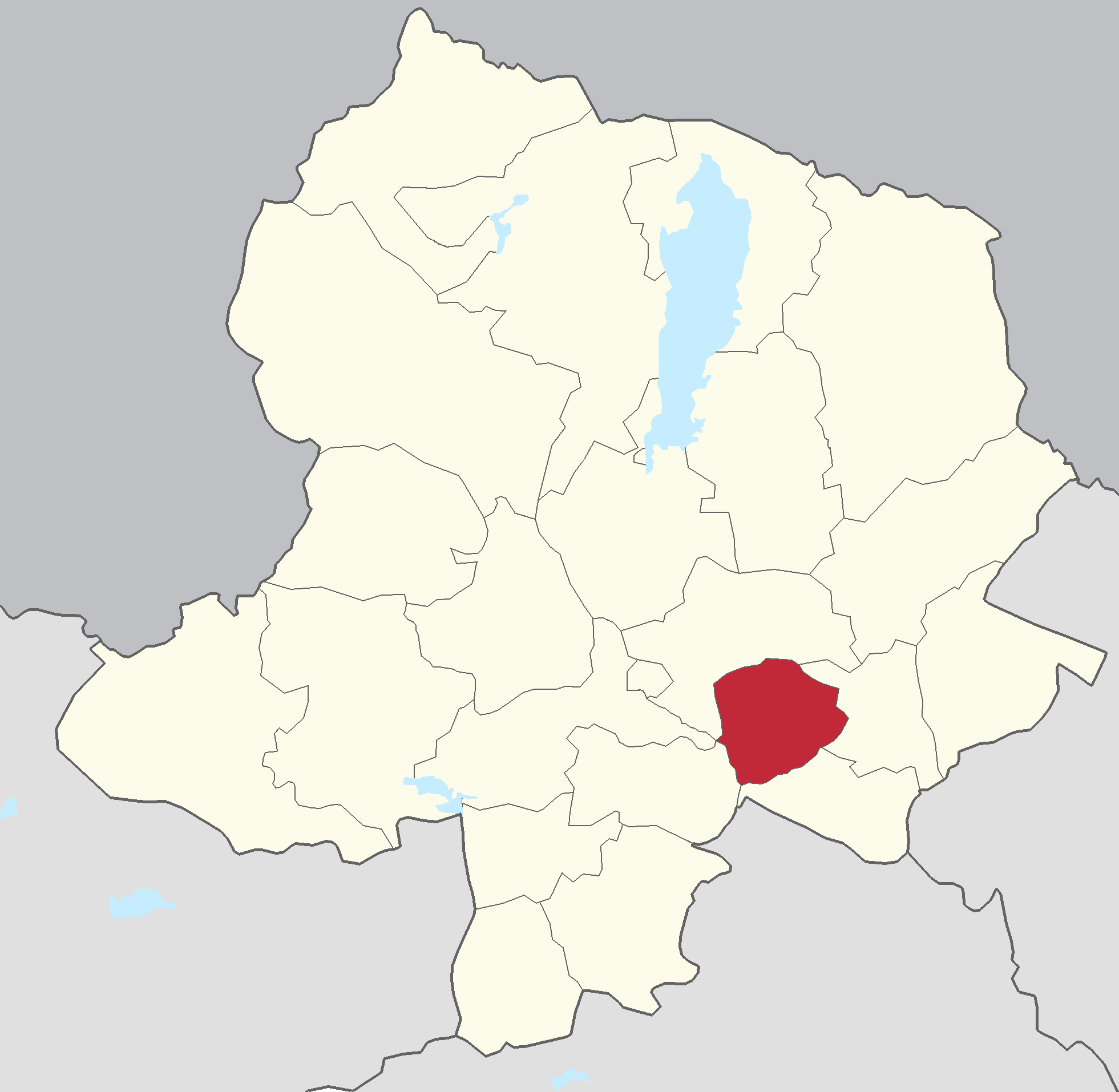
- Tosontsengel District in Khövsgöl Province
- Country: Mongolia
- Province: Khövsgöl Province
- Time zone: UTC+8 (UTC + 8)

Tosontsengel (Mongolian: Тосонцэнгэл) is a sum of Khövsgöl Province, Mongolia. The area is 2,050 km^{2}, of which 1,800 km^{2} are pasture and 11 km^{2} are farmland. In 2000, Tosontsengel had a population of 4,161 people, including some Khotgoid. The sum center, officially named Tsengel (Mongolian: Цэнгэл), is located 64 km east-southeast of Mörön and 607 km from Ulaanbaatar.

== History ==
The Tosontsengel sum was founded, together with the whole Khövsgöl aimag, in 1931. In 1933, it had 3,100 inhabitants in 842 households, and about 99,000 heads of livestock.

In 1956, the local Ardyn Zorig (people's courage) negdel was founded.

On 19 December 2001, a worldwide record high barometric pressure of 1,085.6 hectopascals (32.06 inHg) is recorded at Tosontsengel.

== Administrative divisions ==
The district is divided into five bags, which are:

- Mukhar Khundii
- Selenge
- Suul Ulaan
- Teel
- Tsengel

== Economy ==
In 2004, there were about 137,000 heads of livestock, among them 64,000 goats, 57,000 sheep, 8,800 cattle and yaks, 7,200 horses and 33 camels.

== Literature ==
M. Nyamaa, Khövsgöl aimgiin lavlakh toli, Ulaanbaatar 2001, p. 133
