= Lake Khövsgöl =

Largest freshwater lake in Mongolia

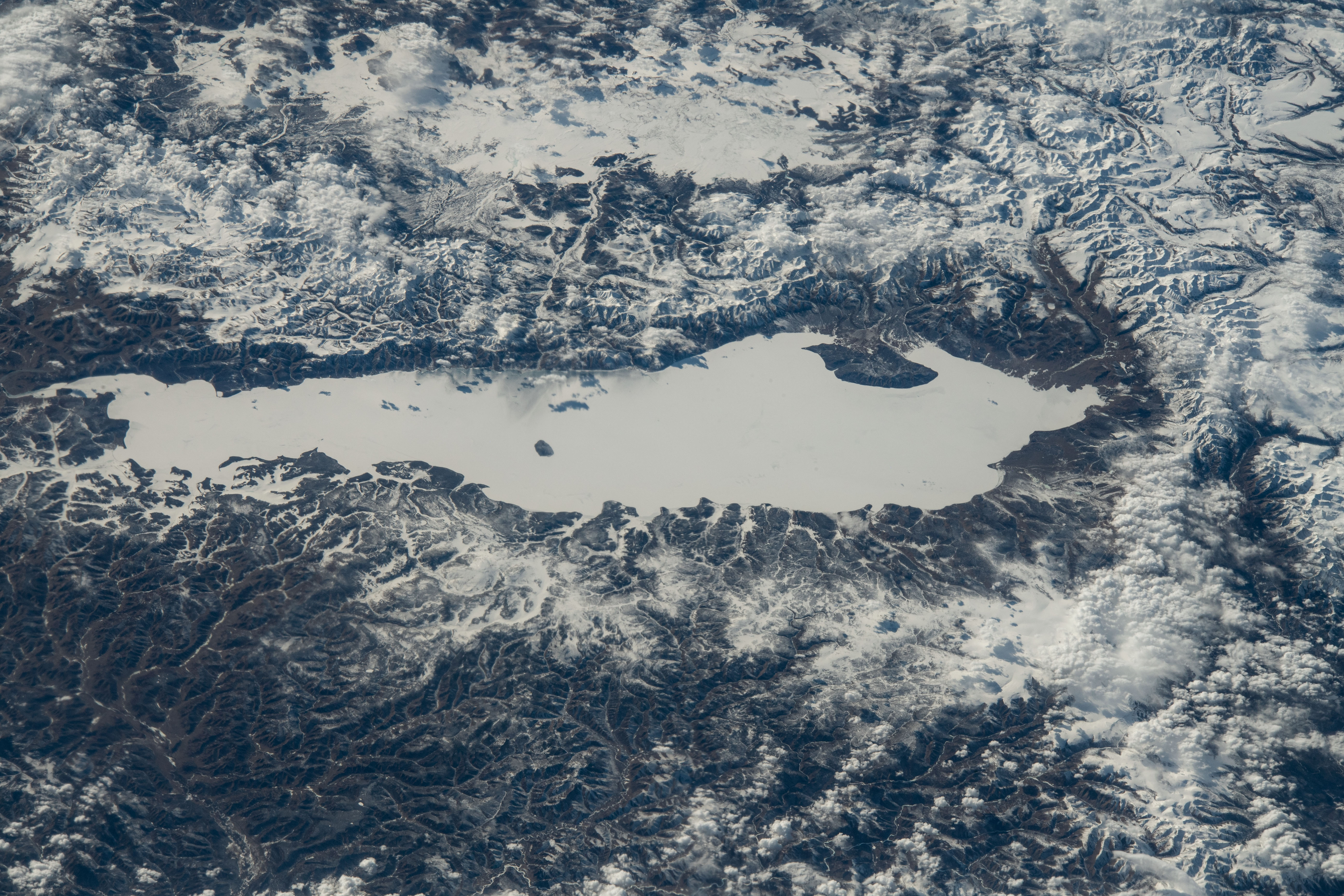
- Satellite image

- Location within Mongolia
- Coordinates: 51°06′N 100°30′E
- Type: Ancient lake, Rift lake
- Primary outflows: Eg River
- Basin countries: Mongolia
- Max. length: 136 km (85 mi)
- Max. width: 36.5 km (22.7 mi)
- Surface area: 2,760 km^{2} (1,070 sq mi)
- Average depth: 138 m (453 ft)
- Max. depth: 267 m (876 ft)
- Water volume: 380.7 km^{3} (91.3 cu mi)
- Surface elevation: 1,645 m (5,397 ft)
- Islands: Dalain-Modon-Khuis, Khadan khui, Modot tolgoi, Baga khui
- Settlements: Khatgal, Khankh

ᠬᠥᠪᠰᠥᠭᠥᠯ
ᠨᠠᠭᠤᠷ
Name in
Chakhar Mongolian
language and script,
köbsügül naɣur

Lake Khövsgöl (Mongolian: Хөвсгөл нуур), also referred to as Khövsgöl Sea (Хөвсгөл далай), is a lake in Khövsgöl Province, Mongolia. It is the largest freshwater lake in the country by volume, and the second largest by area after Uvs Lake. It is nicknamed "Mother Sea" (Далай ээж, Dalai eej) in Mongolian.

== Geography ==
Lake Khövsgöl is located in the northwest of Mongolia near the Russian border, at the foot of the eastern Sayan Mountains. It is 1,645 metres (5,397 feet) above sea level, 136 kilometres (85 miles) long and 262 metres (860 feet) deep. It is the second-most voluminous freshwater lake in Asia, and holds almost 70% of Mongolia's fresh water and 0.4% of all the fresh water in the world. The town of Hatgal lies at the southern end of the lake.

Lake Khövsgöl's watershed is relatively small, and it has only small tributaries. It is drained at the southern end by the Egiin Gol, which connects to the Selenge and ultimately flows into Lake Baikal. Between the two lakes, its waters travel more than 1,000 km (621 mi), and fall 1,169 metres (3,835 feet), although the line-of-sight distance is only about 200 km (124 mi). Its location in northern Mongolia forms one part of the southern border of the great Siberian taiga forest, where the dominant tree is the Siberian larch (Larix sibirica).

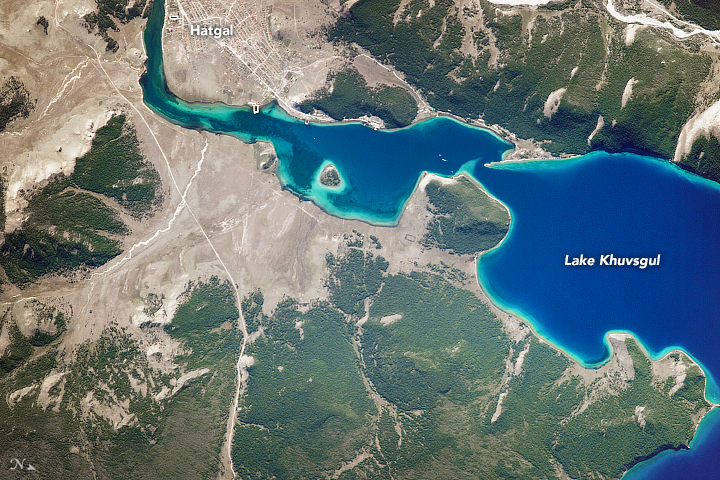
The southern end of the lake as seen from the ISS in 2017.

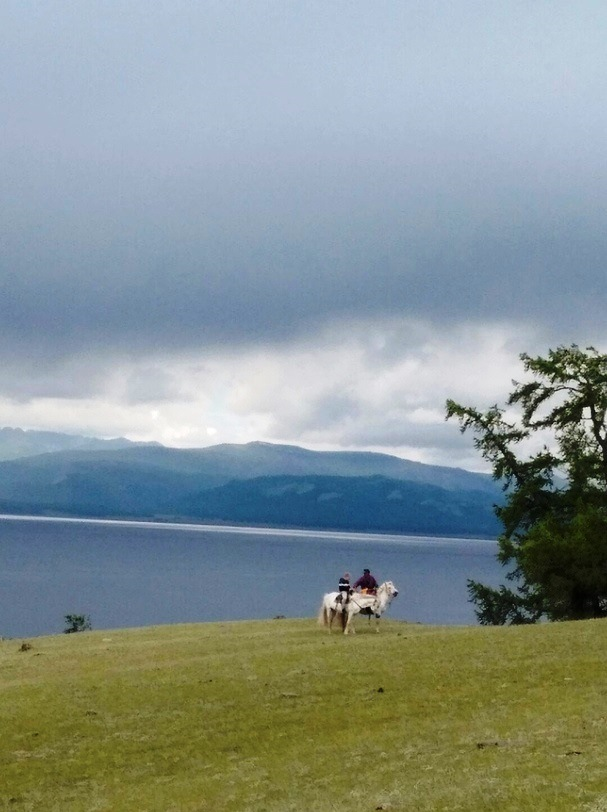
Mongolian arats at the lake

The lake is surrounded by several mountain ranges. The highest mountain is the Bürenkhaan / Mönkh Saridag (3,492 metres (11,457 feet)), whose peak, north of the lake, lies exactly on the border with Russia. The lake freezes over completely in winter, and the ice cover is strong enough to carry heavy trucks; transport routes on its surface offer shortcuts to the normal roads. However, this practice is now forbidden, to prevent pollution of the lake from both oil leaks and trucks breaking through the ice. An estimated 30–40 vehicles have broken through the ice into the lake over the years.

There is a roughly elliptical island in the middle of the lake, named Dalain-Modon-Khuis, measuring 3 km east–west and 2 km north–south. It is located about 11 km from the lake's eastern shore, and 50 km north of the town of Hatgal.

== Ecological significance ==
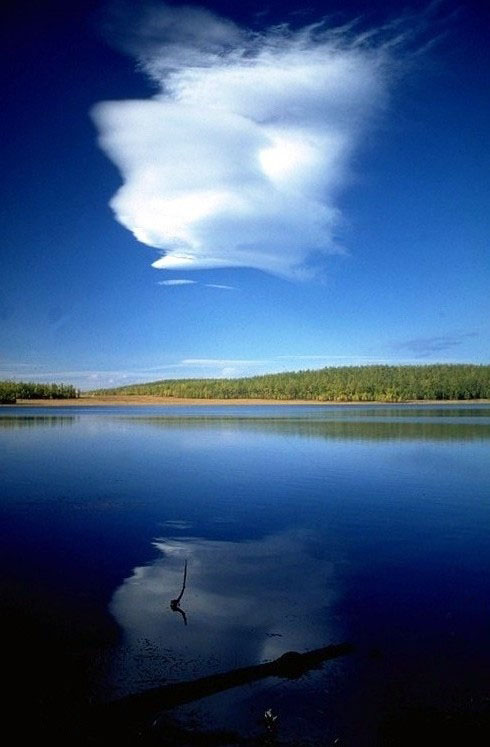
Lake Khövsgöl

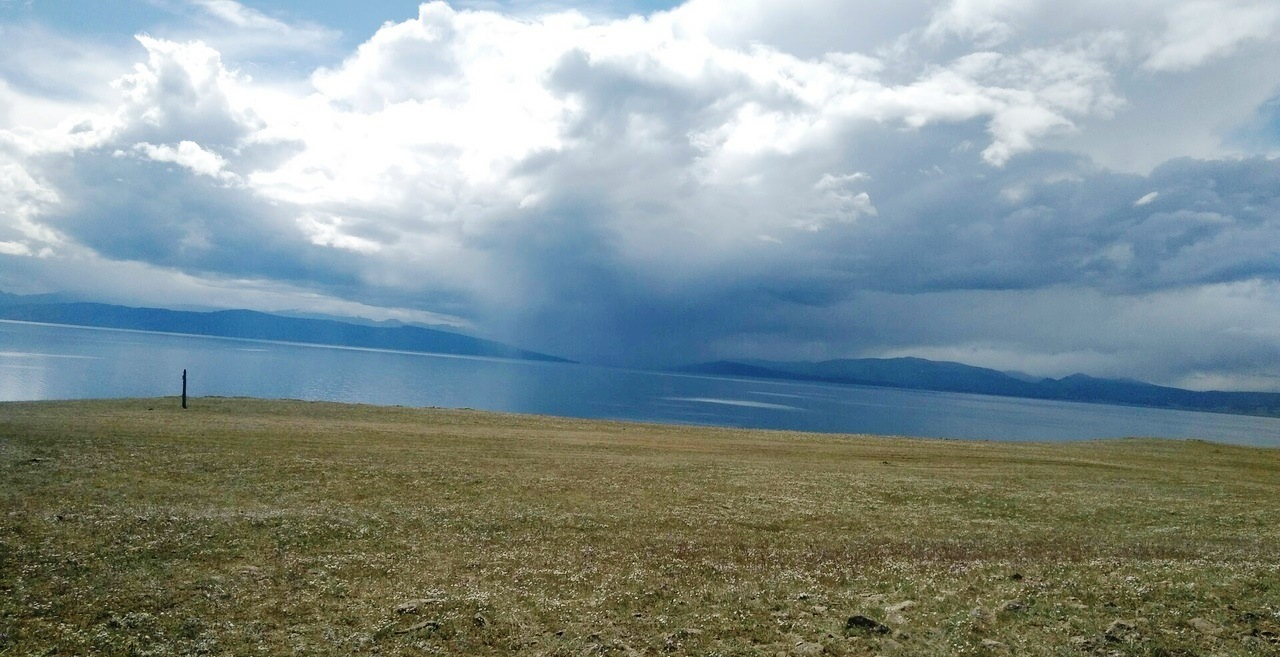
Rainy clouds over Lake Khövsgöl

Khövsgöl is one of twenty ancient lakes in the world, being more than 2 million years old, and the most pristine (apart from Lake Vostok), as well as being the most significant drinking water reserve of Mongolia. Its water is potable without any treatment. Khövsgöl is an ultraoligotrophic lake with low levels of nutrients, primary productivity and high water clarity (Secchi depths > 18 m are common).

The Lake area is a National Park bigger than Yellowstone and strictly protected as a transition zone between Central Asian Steppe and the Siberian Taiga. Despite Khövsgöl's protected status, illegal fishing is common and prohibitions against commercial fishing with gillnets are seldom enforced. The lake is traditionally considered sacred in a land suffering from arid conditions where most lakes are salty.

The Hövsgöl (Khövsgöl) Long-term Ecological Research Site (LTERS) was established in 1997 and an extensive research program began soon thereafter. Now part of an international network of long-term study sites, the Hövsgöl LTERS provides a stage for nurturing Mongolia's scientific and environmental infrastructures, studying climate change, and developing sustainable responses to some of environmental challenges facing the lake and its watershed.

Recent studies has identified high levels of plastic pollution (esp. microplastics) in the lake, showing that even small rural populations can cause high plastics pollution levels, as high as elsewhere around the world.

=== Wildlife ===
The park is home to a variety of wildlife such as ibex, argali, elk, wolf, wolverine, musk deer, brown bear, Siberian moose, and sable. It has also been identified as an Important Bird Area by BirdLife International.

Khövsgöl's fish community is species-poor compared to that of Lake Baikal. Species of commercial and recreational interest include Eurasian perch (Perca fluviatilis), burbot (Lota lota), lenok (Brachymystax lenok), and the endangered endemic Khövsgöl grayling (Thymallus nigrescens). Though endangered by poaching during its spawning runs, the Khövsgöl grayling is still abundant throughout much of the lake.

== Etymology and transliterations ==
The name Khövsgöl is derived from Turkic words for "Khob Su Kol, means Lake with Great water" Göl is the Turkic word for "lake" and today the Mongolian word for river. There are a number of different transcription variants, depending on whether the Cyrillic "х" is transliterated to "h" or "kh," or whether the "ө" is transliterated to "ö," "o," or "u." Transcriptions from the name in the classical Mongolian script, like Hubsugul, Khubsugul etc. may also be seen.

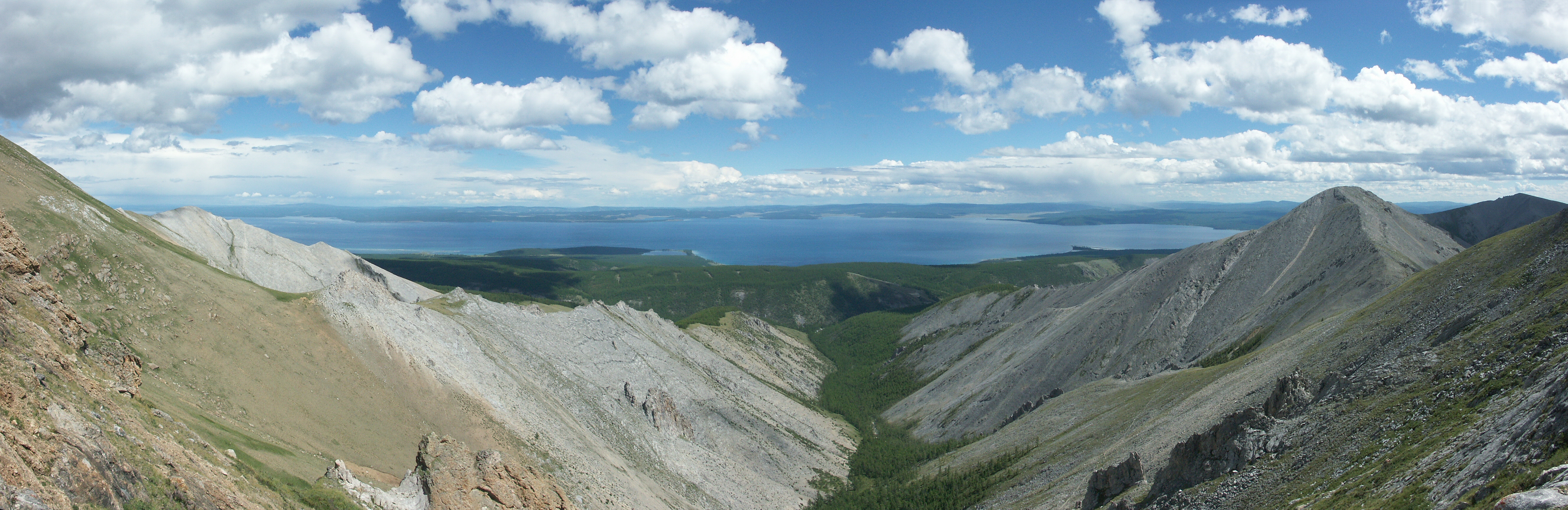
Panoramic view of Lake Khövsgöl
