= Tarialan, Khövsgöl =

District in Khövsgöl Province, Mongolia

Tarialan District Тариалан сум ᠲᠠᠷᠢᠶ᠋ᠠᠯᠠᠩᠰᠤᠮᠤ
- District
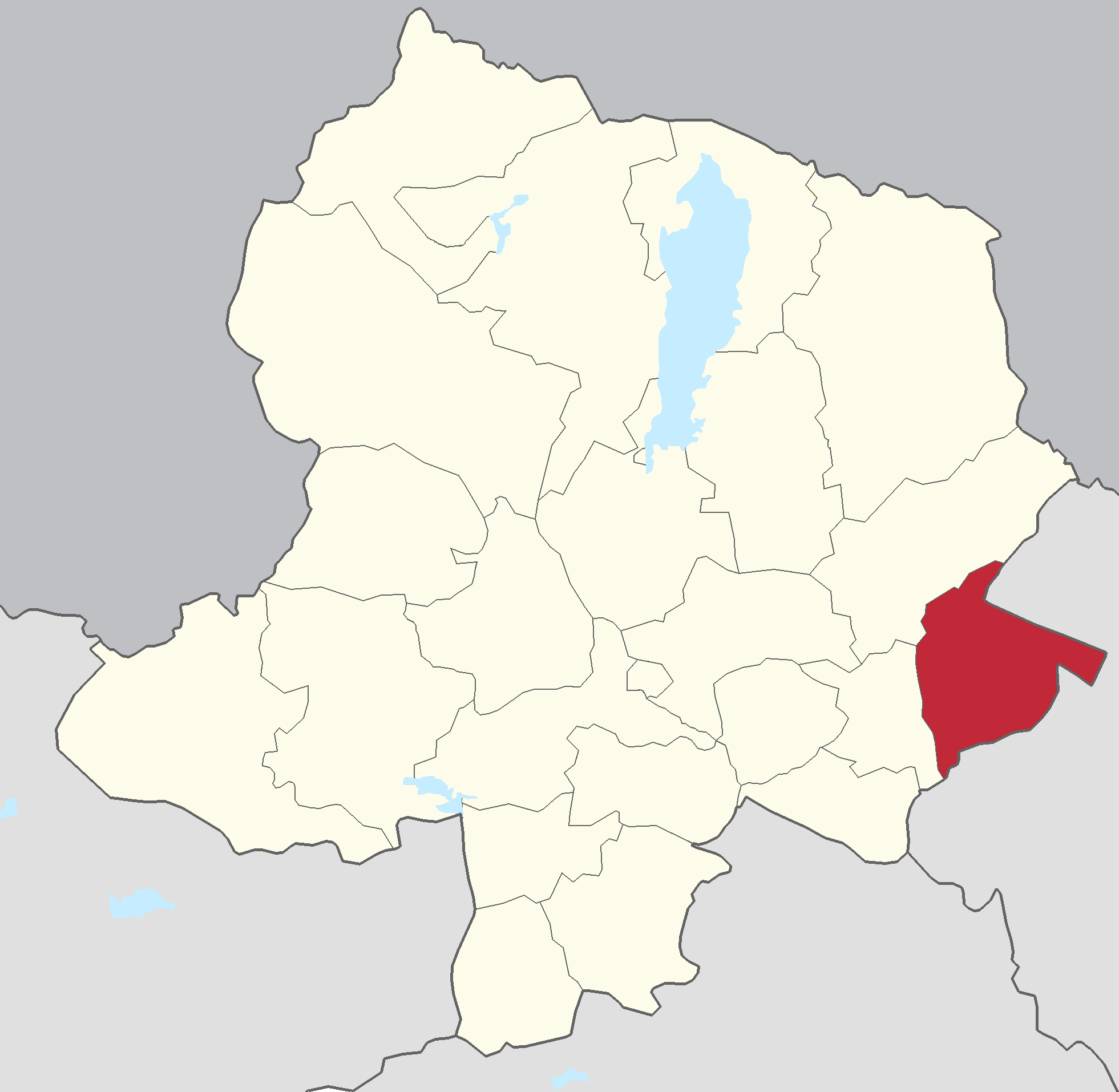
- Tarialan District in Khövsgöl Province

- Location within Mongolia
- Coordinates: 49°36′56″N 101°59′34″E
- Country: Mongolia
- Province: Khövsgöl Province
- Time zone: UTC+8 (UTC + 8)

Tarialan (Mongolian: Тариалан, lit. "arable land") is a sum of Khövsgöl aimag. The area is 3,431 square kilometres (1,325 sq mi), of which 1,582 square kilometres (611 sq mi) are pasture and 167 square kilometres (64 sq mi) are arable land (74% of Khövsgöl aimag total). In 2007, Tarialan had a population of 5,855 people (largest rural sum in Khövsgöl aimag and 2nd most populous after the aimag capital Mörön). The sum center, officially named Badrakh (Mongolian: Бадрах), in 2007 had 2,981 inhabitants and was the 2nd most populous settlement in the aimag after its capital. The sum center is located 160 kilometres (99 mi) east of Mörön and 521 kilometres (324 mi) from Ulaanbaatar.

== History ==
The Tarialian sum was founded, together with the whole Khövsgöl aimag, in 1931. In 1933, it had 3,000 inhabitants in 908 households, and about 50,000 heads of livestock. In 1937, it became seat of a hay production base, which was expanded to a tractor base in 1938. The base became a state farm in 1943.

== Climate ==
Tarialan has a subarctic climate (Köppen climate classification Dwc) bordering on a humid continental climate (Köppen climate classification Dwb) with mild summers and severely cold winters. Most precipitation falls in the summer as rain, with some snow in the adjacent months of May and September. Winters are very dry.

Climate data for Tarialan, elevation 1,235 m (4,052 ft), (1991–2020 normals, extremes 1963–1990, 2002–2023)
Month	Jan	Feb	Mar	Apr	May	Jun	Jul	Aug	Sep	Oct	Nov	Dec	Year
Record high °C (°F)	0.8 (33.4)	12.3 (54.1)	19.9 (67.8)	29.9 (85.8)	32.6 (90.7)	35.5 (95.9)	35.7 (96.3)	36.3 (97.3)	30.0 (86.0)	23.6 (74.5)	13.5 (56.3)	11.9 (53.4)	36.3 (97.3)
Mean daily maximum °C (°F)	−14.8 (5.4)	−8.9 (16.0)	2.7 (36.9)	12.3 (54.1)	18.5 (65.3)	23.7 (74.7)	25.1 (77.2)	22.5 (72.5)	17.4 (63.3)	8.4 (47.1)	−3.6 (25.5)	−12.6 (9.3)	7.6 (45.6)
Daily mean °C (°F)	−21.0 (−5.8)	−16.3 (2.7)	−5.4 (22.3)	4.2 (39.6)	10.5 (50.9)	16.4 (61.5)	18.2 (64.8)	15.7 (60.3)	9.5 (49.1)	0.7 (33.3)	−10.1 (13.8)	−18.6 (−1.5)	0.3 (32.6)
Mean daily minimum °C (°F)	−25.3 (−13.5)	−21.8 (−7.2)	−11.9 (10.6)	−2.9 (26.8)	2.7 (36.9)	9.7 (49.5)	12.5 (54.5)	10.0 (50.0)	3.1 (37.6)	−4.8 (23.4)	−14.9 (5.2)	−22.5 (−8.5)	−5.5 (22.1)
Record low °C (°F)	−38.3 (−36.9)	−37.1 (−34.8)	−29.6 (−21.3)	−22.8 (−9.0)	−12.0 (10.4)	−4.1 (24.6)	−0.2 (31.6)	−4.9 (23.2)	−11.9 (10.6)	−20.8 (−5.4)	−31.6 (−24.9)	−39.9 (−39.8)	−39.9 (−39.8)
Average precipitation mm (inches)	2.0 (0.08)	1.4 (0.06)	2.0 (0.08)	7.0 (0.28)	17.7 (0.70)	52.6 (2.07)	104.3 (4.11)	79.6 (3.13)	25.2 (0.99)	5.9 (0.23)	2.3 (0.09)	1.6 (0.06)	301.6 (11.88)
Average precipitation days (≥ 1.0 mm)	0.6	0.3	0.5	2.0	3.3	7.0	13.2	10.4	5.0	1.6	0.7	0.4	45
Source 1: NOAA (precipitation 1963–1990)
Source 2: Starlings Roost Weather

== Administrative divisions ==
The district is divided into seven bags, which are:

- Ar Tarkhi
- Badrakh
- Bayankhoshuu
- Davaanii Ar
- Mandal
- Selenge
- Tavan Tolgoi

== Economy ==
Arable farming is the basis of the sum economy, so population is dominantly settled in the sum centre.

Minor part of the sum population is pastoral nomadic or seminomadic. In 2007, there were about 153,000 heads of livestock, among them 69,000 goats, 59,000 sheep, 17,000 cattle and yaks, 8,000 horses and 23 camels.

== Miscellaneous ==
The place where Baron Ungern was captured in August 1921 is today on the border between Tarialan and Teshig sum of Bulgan aimag.

== Literature ==
M. Nyamaa, Khövsgöl aimgiin lavlakh toli, Ulaanbaatar 2001, p. 129f
