= Erdenebulgan, Khövsgöl =

District in Khövsgöl Province, Mongolia

Coordinates: 50°07′00″N 101°35′12″E

Erdenebulgan District Эрдэнэбулган сум ᠡᠷᠳᠡᠨᠢᠪᠤᠯᠠᠭᠠᠨᠰᠤᠮᠤ
- District
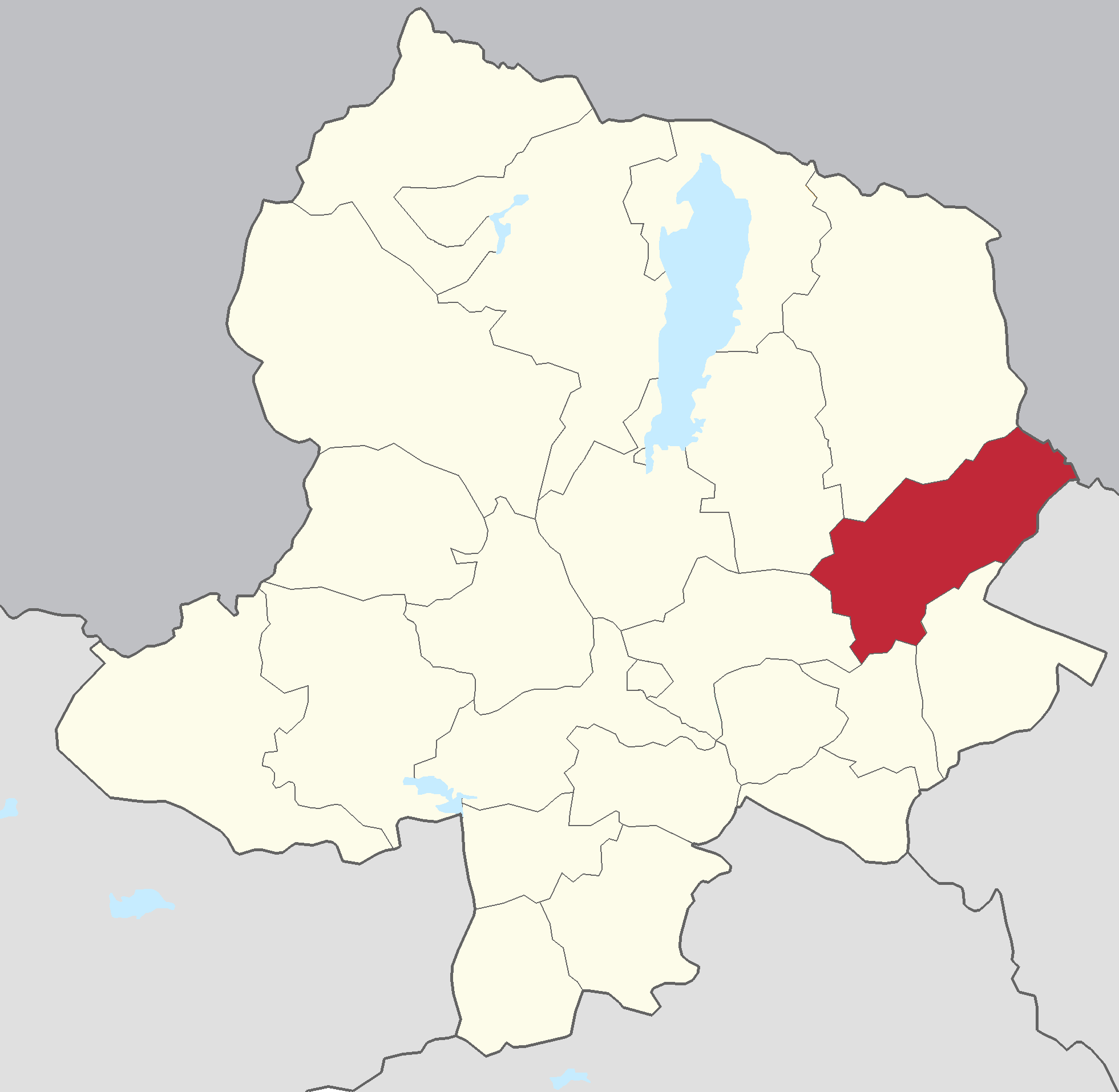
- Location within Khövsgöl aimag
- Country: Mongolia
- Province: Khövsgöl Province
- Founded: 1931

Population (2025)
  - District: 21,399
  - Urban: 20,535
- Time zone: UTC+8 (UTC + 8)

Erdenebulgan (Mongolian: Эрдэнэбулган "sable treasure") is a sum of Khövsgöl aimag. The area is about 4,960 km². In 2000, the sum had 2739 inhabitants. The center, officially named Eg-Üür (Mongolian: Эг-Үүр), is situated on the banks of the Egiin gol.

== History ==
The Erdenebulgan sum was founded, together with the whole Khövsgöl aimag, in 1931. In 1933, it had about 2,600 inhabitants in 792 households, and about 41,000 heads of livestock. In 1956, it was joined with Tsagaan-Üür. In 1959, the Eg-Üür farm was founded, and Erdenebulgan became separate again. In 1975, the sum was dissolved once more, the state farm became part of another farm, but both the sum and the farm were reestablished in 1985. The state farm split up into several smaller firms in the mid-1990s.

In the 1920s, a small Danish group led by Carl Krebs, and with Henning Haslund-Christensen among its members, tried to build up a permanent farming settlement about five kilometers from today's sum center. By 1929, all but Carl Krebs had left the place because of the authority's ever-increasing suspicions towards western foreigners. Krebs had to leave in the late 1930s.

== Administrative divisions ==
The district is divided into five bags, which are:

- Bulgan Tal
- Buurulj
- Duurga
- Udgan
- Zerleg

== Economy ==
In 2004, there were roughly 47,000 heads of livestock, among them 16,000 sheep, 15,000 goats, 11,000 cattle and yaks, 5,300 horses, and 5 camels.

== Literature ==
M.Nyamaa, Khövsgöl aimgiin lavlakh toli, Ulaanbaatar 2001, p. 219ff
