= Khövsgöl Province =

Province of Mongolia

Khövsgöl Province Хөвсгөл аймаг ᠬᠥᠪᠰᠦᠭᠦᠯ ᠠᠢᠮᠠᠭ
- Province
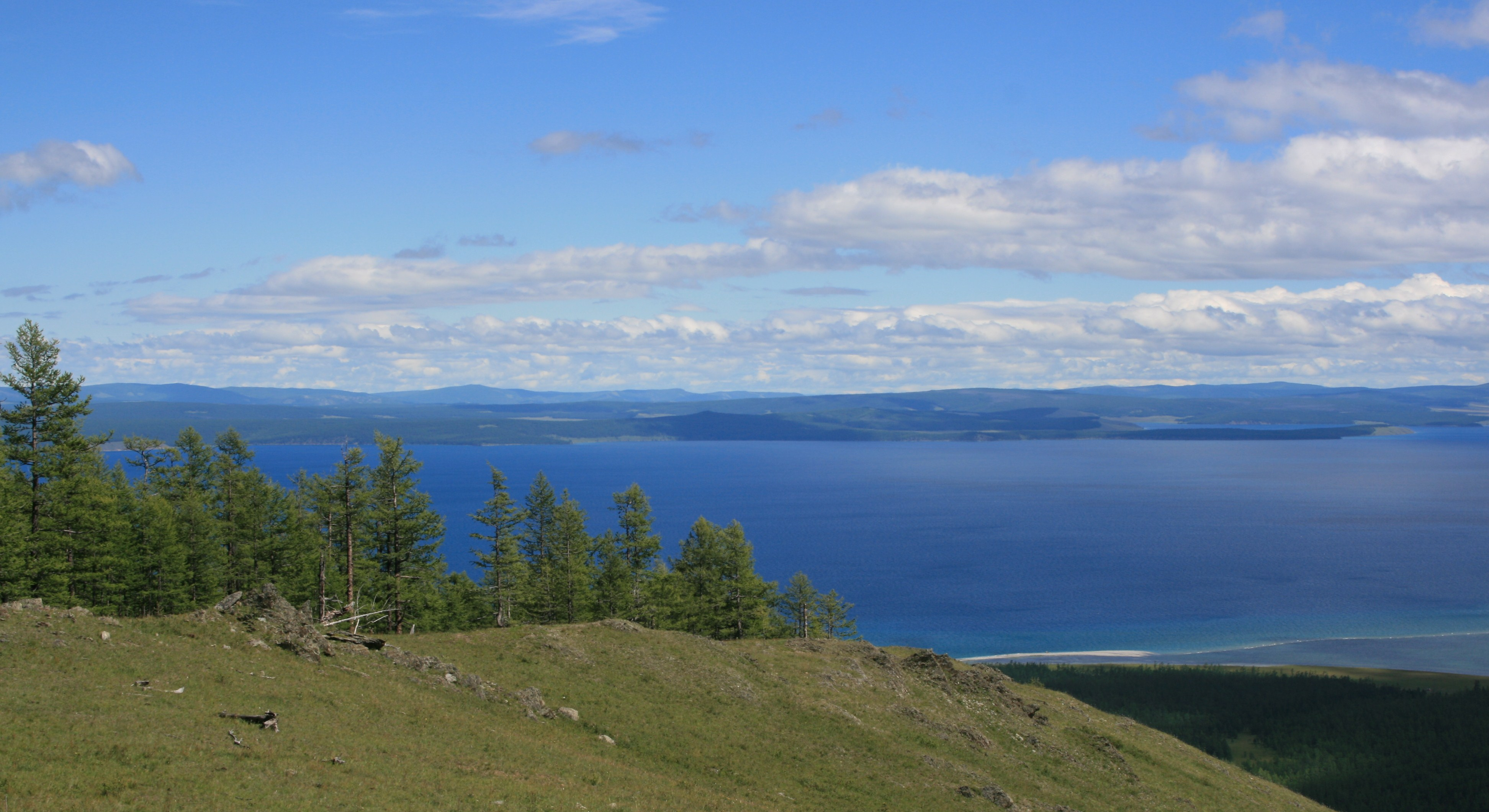
- Lake Khövsgöl Lakeside coniferous tree Yaks grazing Darkhad Valley

- Flag Coat of arms

- Coordinates: 49°38′N 100°10′E
- Country: Mongolia
- Established: 1931
- Capital: Mörön

Government
  - Body: Citizens' Representatives Khural of Khövsgöl Province

Area
  - Total: 100,628.82 km^{2} (38,853.00 sq mi)

Population (2025)
  - Total: 135,600
  - Density: 1.348/km^{2} (3.490/sq mi)

GDP
  - Total: MNT 1.3275 trillion US$ 369 million (2025)
  - Per capita: MNT 9,729,500; US$ 2,704 (2025)
- Time zone: UTC+8
- Area code: +976 138
- ISO 3166 code: MN-041
- Vehicle registration: ХӨ_
- Website: khovsgol.gov.mn

Khövsgöl Province (Mongolian: Хөвсгөл аймаг) is the northernmost of the 21 provinces of Mongolia, bordering Buryatia and Tuva, Russia. Its name is derived from Lake Khövsgöl, the largest freshwater lake in the country. The province was established in 1931. Its administrative center is the city of Mörön; prior to 1933, its capital was Khatgal, located near the southern tip of Lake Khövsgöl.

== Geography and history ==
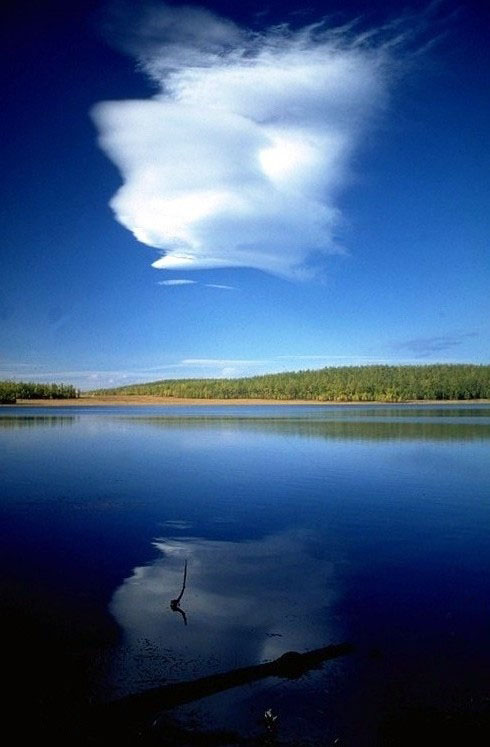
Lake Khövsgöl

The round-topped Tarvagatai, Bulnain, and Erchim sub-ranges of the Khangai massif dominate the south and southwest of the largely mountainous province, and north and west of Lake Khövsgöl lie the alpine Khoridol Saridag, Ulaan Taiga, and Mönkh Saridag mountains. The central and eastern parts of the province are less mountainous, but still hilly.

The region is well known in Mongolia for its natural environment, and Lake Khövsgöl, the largest freshwater lake, is one of the country's major tourist attractions. The largest forests of Mongolia are located around and to the north of the lake, extending the South Siberian taiga.

The aimag was founded in 1931. Khatgal was the administrative center until 1933; since then it has been Mörön.

== Population ==
The region is home to many ethnic minority groups: Darkhad, Khotgoid, Uriankhai, Buriad, and Tsaatan. Both the Darkhad and Tsaatan are famous for their practice of shamanism.

Ethnic minority groups in Khövsgöl (self-identification), 2000 census
Group	Population	Percentage
Darkhad	16,268	13.8%
Khotgoid	6229	5.3%
Uriankhai	3036	2.6%
Buriad	996	0.84%
Tsaatan	269	0.23%
Total population	117914	100%

Khövsgöl aimag population
1956 census	1960 est.	1963 census	1969 census	1975 est.	1979 census	1981 est.	1989 census	1992 est.	1996 est.	1998 est.	2000 census	2003 est.	2005 est.	2007 est.
58,200	64,000	63,700	74,800	82,300	88,200	91,100	101,800	119,133	113,312	117,123	117,914	124,126	123,416	123,275

== Economy ==
In 2018, the province contributed to 1.84% of the total national GDP of Mongolia.

=== Livestock ===
In 2007, the aimag was home to about 3.43 million heads of livestock, among them about 1,510,000 goats, 1,442,000 sheep, 322,000 cattle and yaks, 150,000 horses, 2,350 camels, and 652 reindeer.

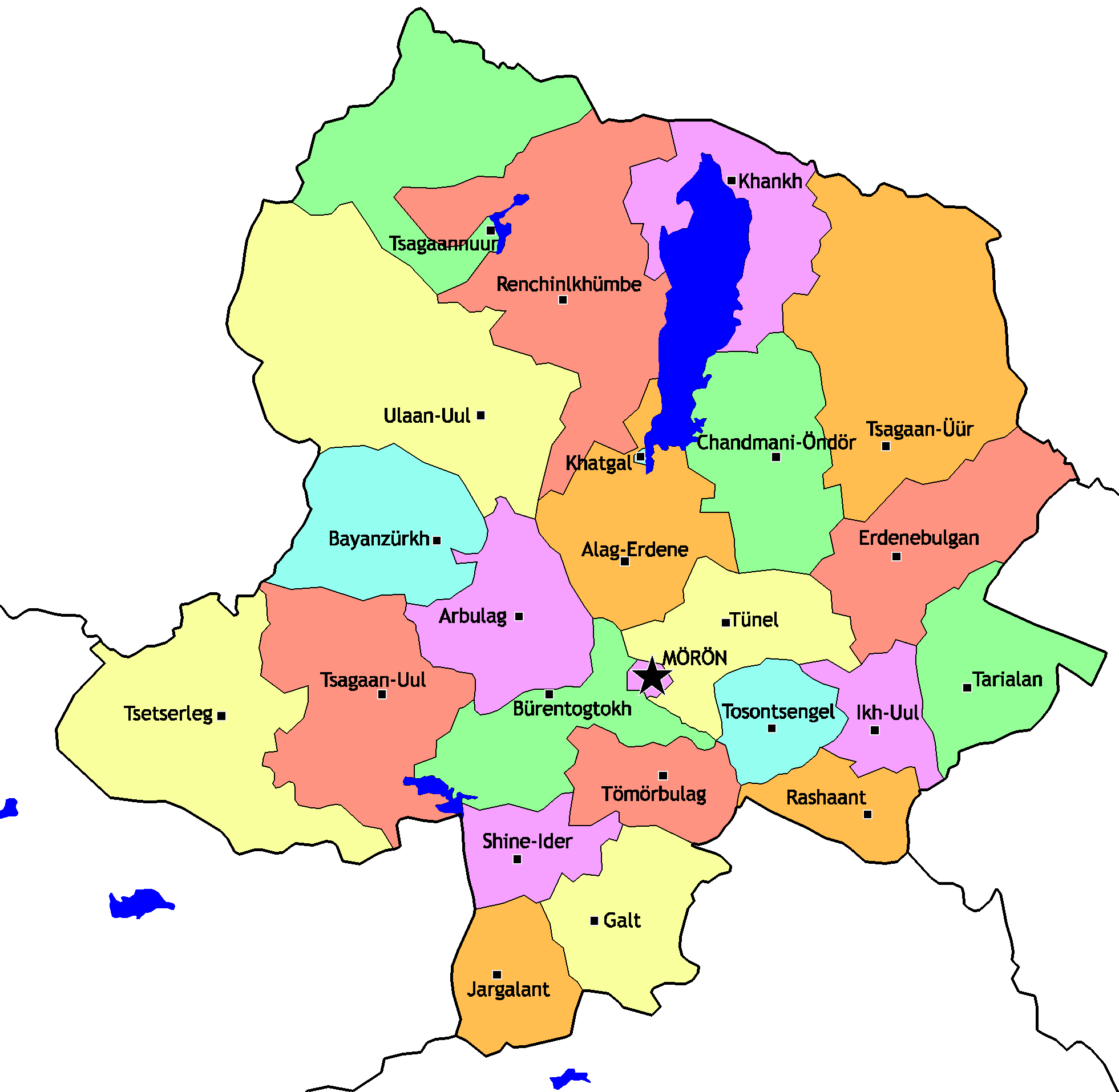
Sums of Khövsgöl

== Transportation ==
The Mörön Airport (ZMMN/MXV) has one paved runway. It offers regular flights from and to Ulaanbaatar, and also serves as intermediate stop into the western Aimags.

The Khatgal Airport (HTM) only runs scheduled flights from and to Ulaanbaatar in summer, offering a more direct approach to Lake Khövsgöl for the tourists.

The road distance from Mörön to Ulaanbaatar is 690 km. A new paved road finished in fall 2012 now connects Mörön to Khatgal on Lake Khövsgöl.

== Administrative subdivisions ==
The Sums of Khövsgöl Aimag
Sum	Mongolian	Population 1987 (approx.)	Population 1994	Population 2000	Population 2005	Population 2009	Sum centre population (2009)	Area (km²)	Density (/km²)
Alag-Erdene; Khatgal	Алаг-Эрдэнэ; Хатгал	2,300; 7,000	2,809; 3,756	2,825; 2,498	2,992; 2,831	2,980; 2,952	744; 2,952	3,591.5; 911,4	0.83; 3.24
Arbulag	Арбулаг	3,100	4,272	4,487	4,164	3,989	728	3,529.21	1.13
Bayanzürkh	Баянзүрх	3,300	4,180	4,202	3,863	3,964	742	4,299.14	0.92
Bürentogtokh	Бүрэнтогтох	3,800	5,043	4,678	4,251	4,245	735	3,768.60	1.12
Chandmani-Öndör	Чандмань-Өндөр	2,100	2,891	3,063	2,944	3,006	1,018	4,487.54	0.67
Erdenebulgan	Эрдэнэбулган	2,300	3,086	2,739	2,849	2,763	1,060	4,694.38	0.59
Galt	Галт	4,400	5,573	5,328	4,876	5,132	777	3,596.83	1.43
Ikh-Uul	Их-Уул	3,200	3,767	3,959	4,126	4,170	1,387	2,023.82	2.06
Jargalant	Жаргалант	3,700	4,866	5,086	5,109	5,183	1,315	2,549.28	2.03
Khankh	Ханх	n.a.	2,227	2,140	2,346	2,460	1,422	5,498.71	0.45
Mörön	Мөрөн	n.a.	27,230	28,147	35,872	36,082	36,072	102.90	350.55
Rashaant	Рашаант	2,500	3,195	3,280	3,559	3,501	987	1,982.52	1.77
Renchinlhümbe	Рэнчинлхүмбэ	3,900	4,040	4,284	4,614	4,740	825	8,448.34	0.56
Shine-Ider	Шинэ-Идэр	3,900	4,616	4,348	4,068	3,824	1,718	2,053.56	1.86
Tarialan	Тариалан	4,800	6,122	6,070	5,936	6,085	3,272	3,430.67	1.77
Tömörbulag	Төмөрбулаг	3,100	4,084	4,171	4,353	4,174	613	2,521.72	1.66
Tosontsengel	Тосонцэнгэл	2,800	3,683	4,161	3,615	4,144	1,166	2,042.23	2,03
Tsagaannuur	Цагааннуур	900	1,248	1,317	1,405	1,547	708	5,408.30	0.29
Tsagaan-Uul	Цагаан-Уул	4,300	5,547	5,696	5,145	5,332	940	5,866.3	0.91
Tsagaan-Üür	Цагаан-Үүр	2,000	2,590	2,421	2,442	2,459	946	8,735.33	0.28
Tsetserleg	Цэцэрлэг	4,400	5,591	5,876	4,693	4,766	807	7,451.62	0.64
Tünel	Түнэл	2,900	3,579	3,556	3,465	3,528	1,105	3,577.33	0.99
Ulaan-Uul	Улаан-Уул	2,700	3,396	3,726	3,898	4,118	1,386	10,057.52	0.41

== Notable natives ==
- Chingünjav, leader of an anti-Manchu rebellion in 1756/57;
- The Jalkhanz Khutagt Damdinbazar, a prime minister of Mongolia in the early 1920s;
- Öndör Gongor, a tall man with the gigantism condition in early-20th century Mongolia;
- Gelenkhüü, an inventor and hero of local folklore;
- Oyungerel Tsedevdamba, human rights advocate, first Mongolian to graduate from Stanford, first woman to join the Mongolian parliament;
- Bayarjargal Agvaantseren, conservationist and founder of Snow Leopard Conservation Foundation;

Henning Haslund-Christensen, a Danish traveller and explorer, spent one or two years in a place that today is in Erdenebulgan sum in the early 1920s. Some locals believe that Alan Gua, an ancestor of Genghis Khan, hails from what is now Chandmani-Öndör.

== Gallery ==
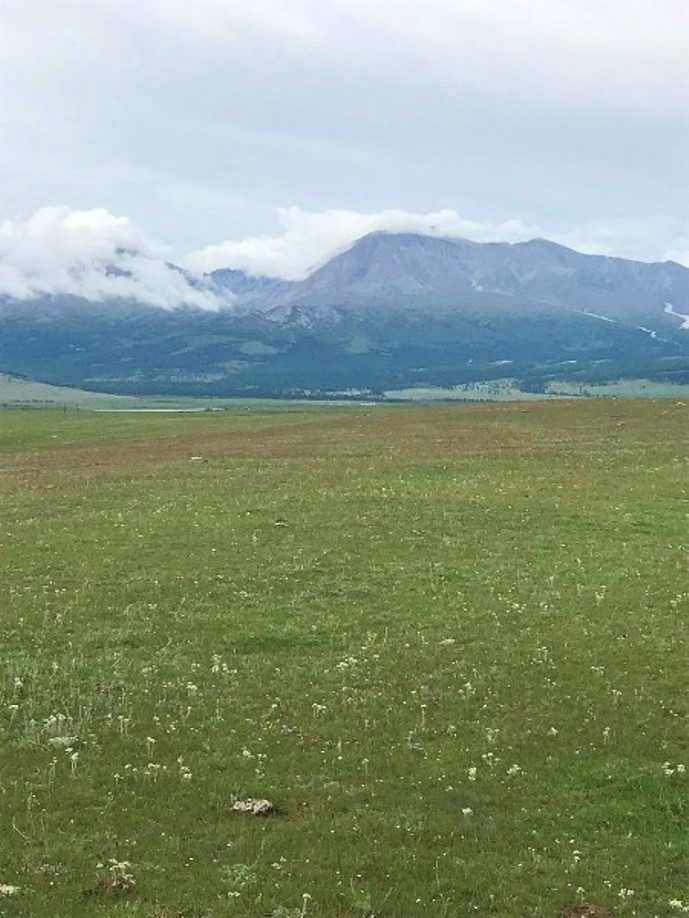
Landscape of Hubsugul province

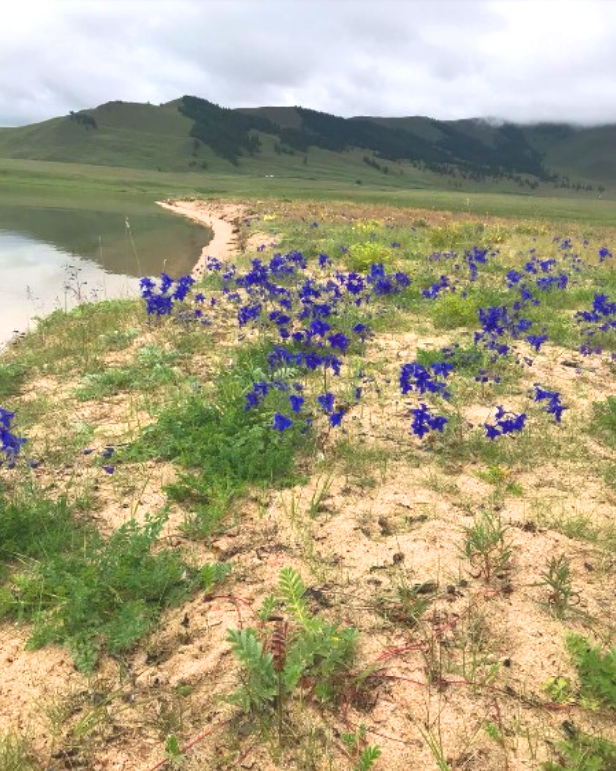
Steppe flora of the province

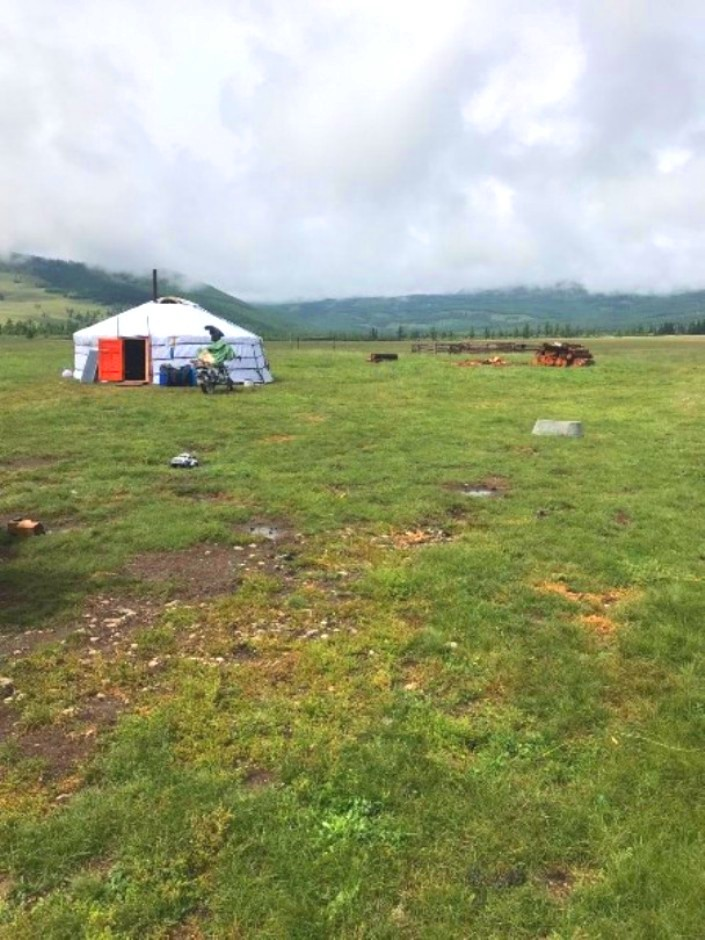
Yurt locals

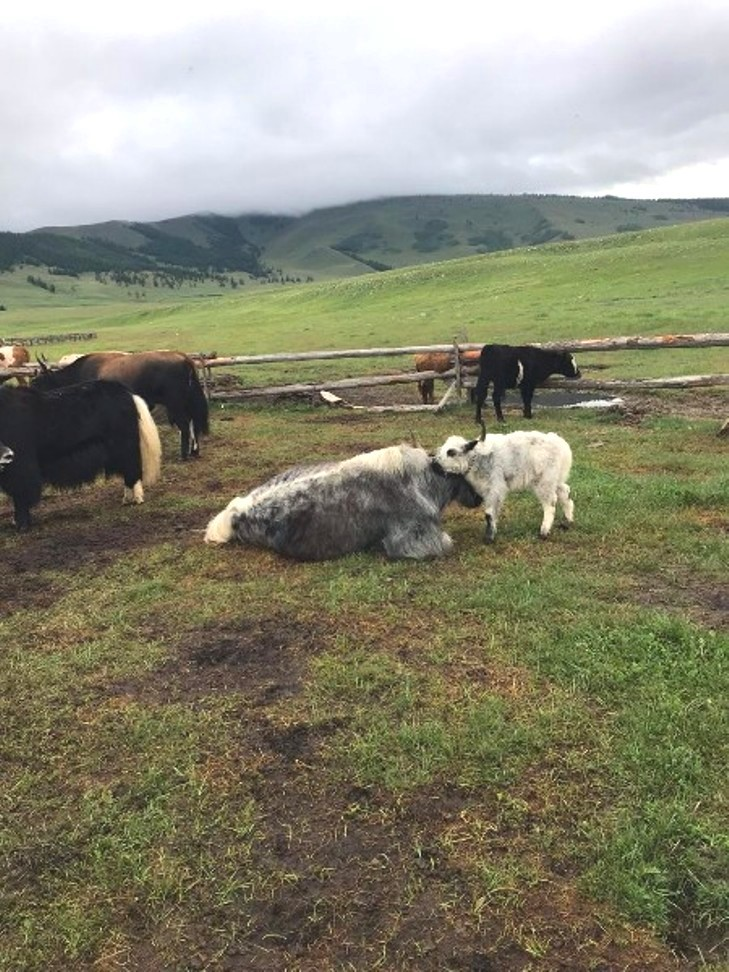
Nomadic cattle
