= Negdel =

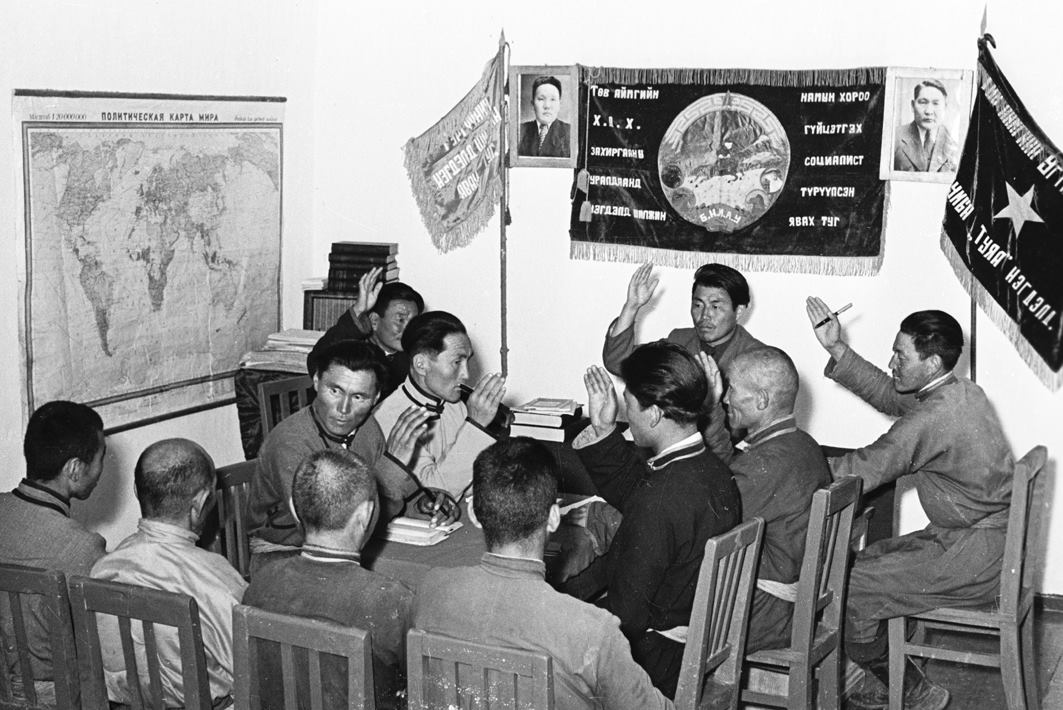
Negdel meeting in Töv Province, in the mid-to-late 1950s.

Negdel (Mongolian: Нэгдэл, "union, association") is the common term for the agricultural cooperatives in the Mongolian People's Republic. The full name is Khödöö aj akhuin negdel (Mongolian: Хөдөө аж ахуйн нэгдэл = Agricultural association).

== History ==
=== Early attempts ===
Coinciding with the collectivization of Joseph Stalin in the Soviet Union, Soviet-style leftist policies were implemented in the Mongolian People's Republic by the emerging leftist leaders in late 1928. The "left course" policies included confiscation of feudal property, anti-religious campaigns, development of a five-year plan, and forced agricultural collectivization nationwide. The policies, however, lacked popular support by the public who were nomadic, largely illiterate, and obedient to traditional authorities. Despite the opposition, the policies, backed by the Comintern and the Soviet Union, were accelerated following the Eighth Party Congress in April 1930.

Under the directions of Khorloogiin Choibalsan, waves of repression came in 1929, 1931, and 1932. The first persecution occurred in 1929, when over 600 feudal estates, mostly in the form of herds, were confiscated and given to the masses and former monks. Later in 1931 and 1932, estates of over 800 religious and secular leaders were seized alongside the killing and imprisonment of over 700 heads of households. By 1931, more than one-third of the herder households had been forcibly communized.

Consequently, Mongolia's livestock population decreased by around a third. The brutal nature and repercussions of collectivization lead to uprisings by the buddhist clergy in Western Mongolia. Consequently, in May 1932, the Comintern and the Communist Party of the Soviet Union directed the party to end its extremism. The revolt was quelled with the help of the Soviet Union in late 1932.

=== Introduction of the negdel ===
New attempts at collectivization were begun with different tactics and another name - the cooperatives in the early 1930s had been called khamtral (Mongolian: Хамтрал), i.e. collective, kolkhoz - in the mid-1930s, but initially only on a very small scale: while there were 139 negdels country-wide in 1950, in 1949 ten negdels in Khövsgöl combined had no more than 4,700 animals, with the smallest negdel only owning 43.

=== Collectivization ===
The move towards collectivization gained momentum in the mid-1950s and by 1960, 99.5% of herders had "voluntarily" joined a negdel. The number of negdels was gradually decreased so that in time they became identical to sums both area and population-wise.

=== Dissolution ===
After the dissolution of the Soviet Union and the Mongolian Revolution of 1990, the herds were privatized again and all negdels dissolved. Farms were organized into private companies. The process of privatisation occurred through two phases of reform between 1991 and 1992.

== Organization ==
A negdel was organized into several brigades that were mostly nomadic. The members of a negdel received wages and were entitled to holidays and pensions. Dependent on the geographical location, herders were allowed to keep 10-15 private animals per family member, but no more than 50-75 per family.
