= Bulgan =

Bulgan may refer to:

- Bulgan Province, a province (aimag) of Mongolia
- Bulgan (city), the capital of Bulgan province
- Bulgan Airport, the airport of Bulgan city
- Bulgan Gol, a upstream river of Ulungur River
- several districts (sums) in different provinces:
  - Bulgan, Arkhangai
  - Bulgan, Bayan-Ölgii
  - Bulgan, Dornod
  - Bulgan, Khovd
  - Erdenebulgan, Khövsgöl
  - Bulgan, Ömnögovi
- Bulgan, Azerbaijan
