= Jadambyn Bat-Erdene =

Mongolian politician (born 1965)

- Жадамбын Бат-Эрдэнэ
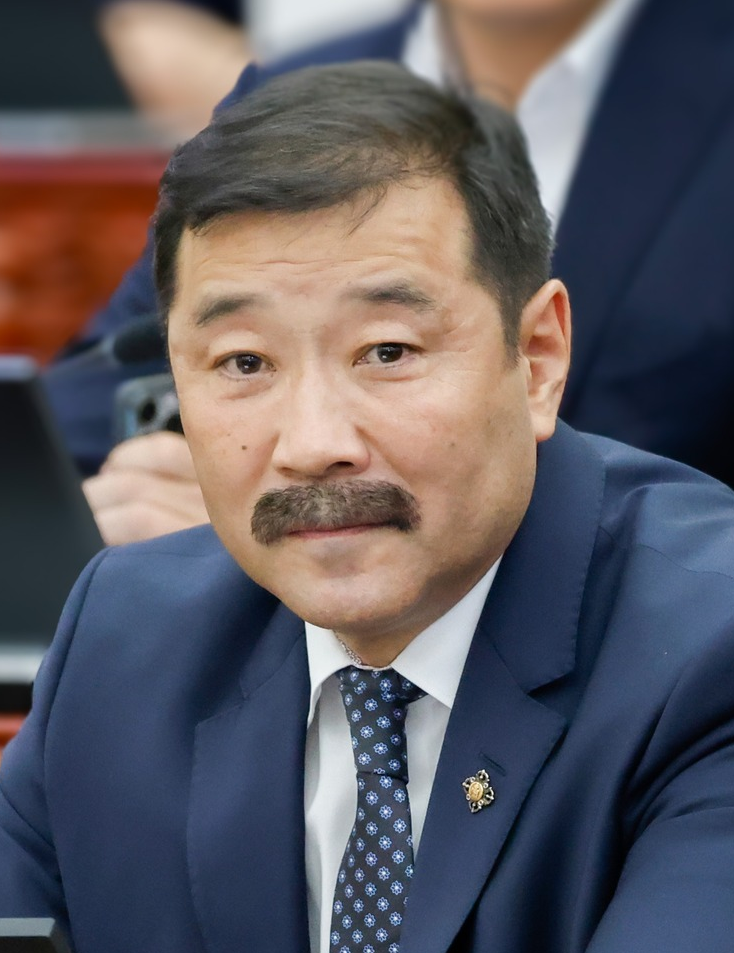
- Bat-Erdene in 2025

Deputy Chairman of the State Great Khural
- Incumbent
- Assumed office 12 November 2025 Serving with Bökhchuluuny Pürevdorj
- Chairman: Nyam-Osoryn Uchral; Sandagiin Byambatsogt
- Preceded by: Khürelbaataryn Bulgantuya

Member of the State Great Khural
- Incumbent
- Assumed office 5 July 2016
- Constituency: 4th, Bulgan, Khövsgöl, Orkhon Province (2024–2028); 4th, Bulgan Province (2020–2024); 10th, Bulgan Province (2016–2020)

Minister of Road and Transport Development
- In office 18 October 2017 – October 2018
- Prime Minister: Ukhnaagiin Khürelsükh
- Preceded by: Dangaagiin Ganbat
- Succeeded by: Yangugiin Sodbaatar

Personal details
- Born: 1965 (age 60–61) Khutag-Öndör, Bulgan, Mongolia
- Party: Mongolian People's Party
- Education: Polytechnic Institute of Irkutsk; National University of Mongolia (BA)
- Website: www.jbaterdene.mn/en

Jadambyn Bat-Erdene (Mongolian: Жадамбын Бат-Эрдэнэ; born 1965) is a Mongolian politician who has served as the deputy chairman of the State Great Khural since November 2025. He briefly served as acting Chairman of the State Great Khural in November 2025 and again from March to April 2026, when the office was vacant.

Born in Bulgan Province, he previously served as the Minister of Road and Transport Development of Mongolia from 2017 to 2018 and was elected to the State Great Khural from his home province three times — in 2016, 2020, and recently in 2024.

== Early life and education ==
Jadambyn Bat-Erdene was born in 1965 in Khutag-Öndör district of Bulgan Province. His father was a driver from Khutag-Öndör, while his mother was a circus performer from neighboring Bugat district. He went to the Polytechnic Institute of Irkutsk in the Soviet Union and graduated in 1989.

From 1990 to 1992, he worked as the manager of Rybcoop in Yuzhno-Sakhalinsk. Bat-Erdene then studied at the National University of Mongolia from 1995 to 1998, where he graduated with a Bachelor of Arts in Legal services.

== Political career ==
A member of the Mongolian People's Party (MPP), he was first elected to the State Great Khural from the 10th constituency in Bulgan Province during the 2016 parliamentary election.

In October 2017, Bat-Erdene was appointed as the Minister of Road and Transport Development by prime minister Ukhnaagiin Khürelsükh, succeeding Dangaagiin Ganbat, who served in the previous cabinet of Jargaltulgyn Erdenebat. He was succeeded by Yangugiin Sodbaatar in late 2018 when he resigned from the post.

He was re-elected from his home province as a member of parliament in the 2020 and 2024 parliamentary elections.

During the 2025 political crisis between factions in the ruling MPP, deputy chairwoman Khürelbaataryn Bulgantuya chaired the motion to dismiss incumbent prime minister Gombojavyn Zandanshatar. However, this motion was later vetoed by president Khürelsükh and found unconstitutional by the Constitutional Court of Mongolia. She was dismissed by the MPP caucus on 30 October. Bat-Erdene was nominated as the next deputy speaker. He officially succeeded Bulgantuya as deputy chairman of the State Great Khural on 12 November 2025.

Between 12 and 20 November 2025, he served as the acting Chairman of the State Great Khural until Nyam-Osoryn Uchral was nominated as speaker. Later on 30 March 2026, he temporarily chaired the State Great Khural again following the resignation of Nyam-Osoryn Uchral. A few days later, on 4 April, he was succeeded by Sandagiin Byambatsogt, the next speaker of parliament.
