= Khanui River =

River in Mongolia

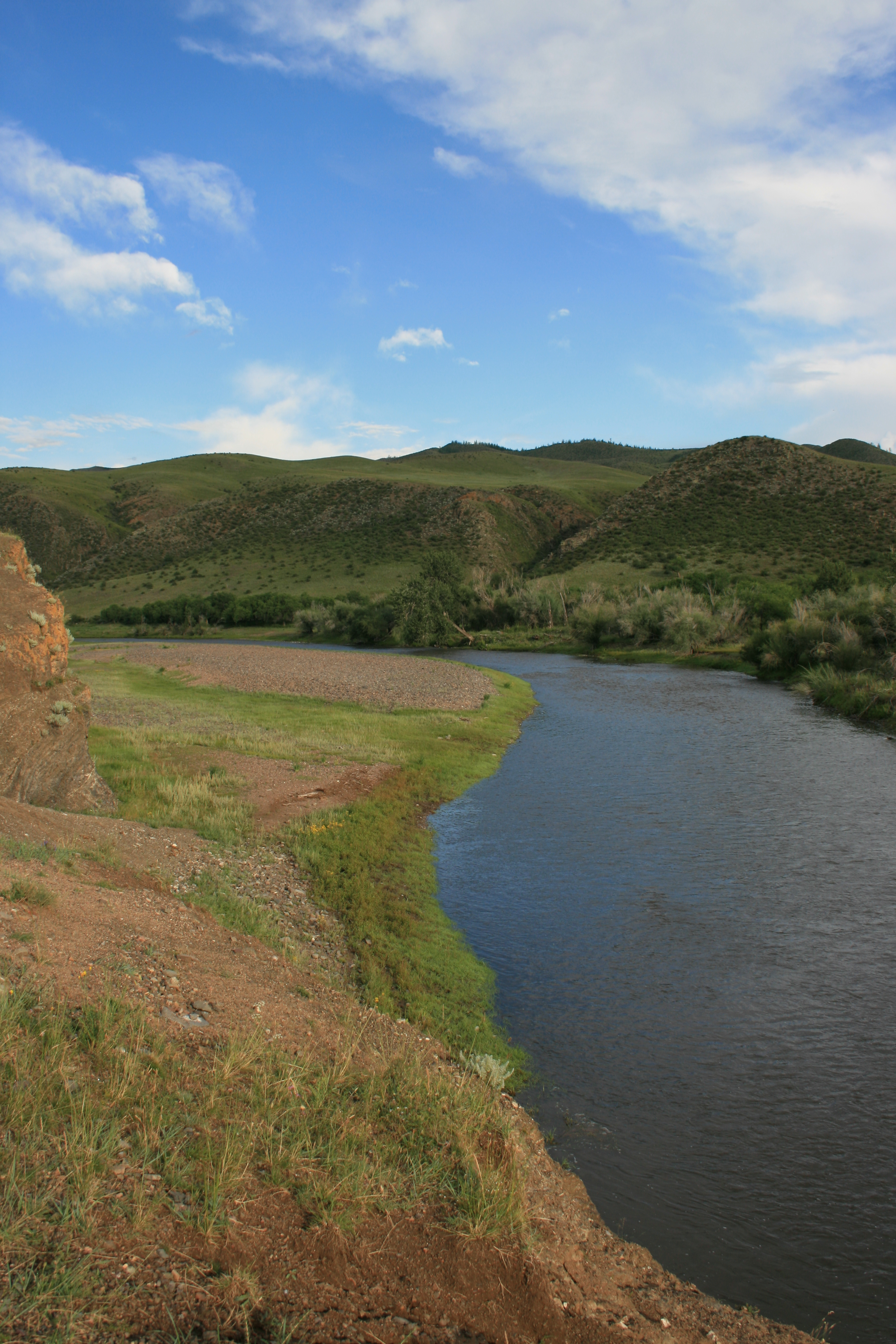
- Native name: Хануй гол (Mongolian)

Location
- Country: Mongolia
- Aimags: Arkhangai, Bulgan

Physical characteristics
- Source: Khan-Öndör Uul
  - location: Chuluut sum, Arkhangai aimag
  - coordinates: 47°25′N 100°25′E
- Mouth: Selenga
  - location: Khishig-Öndör sum, Bulgan aimag
  - coordinates: 49°20′45″N 102°21′35″E
- Length: 421 km (262 mi)
- Basin size: 14,620 km^{2} (5,640 sq mi)

Basin features
- Progression: Selenga→ Lake Baikal→ Angara→ Yenisey→ Kara Sea

Khanui River (Mongolian: Хануй гол) is a river flowing down through the valleys of the Khangai Mountains in central Mongolia. It starts in the Chuluut sum of Arkhangai aimag at the north slopes of the Khan-Öndör mountain. It passes next to the center of Erdenemandal sum, and ends in the Khutag-Öndör sum of Bulgan aimag where it discharges into Selenga River. It is 421 kilometres (262 mi) long, and has a drainage basin of 14,600 square kilometres (5,600 sq mi).

== Usage ==
In 2014, around 0.5 million m^{3} of water was withdrawn from the river for livestock, cropland and industrial use.
