= Zelter River =

River in Mongolia and Russia

Zelter River Zheltura (Желтура́)
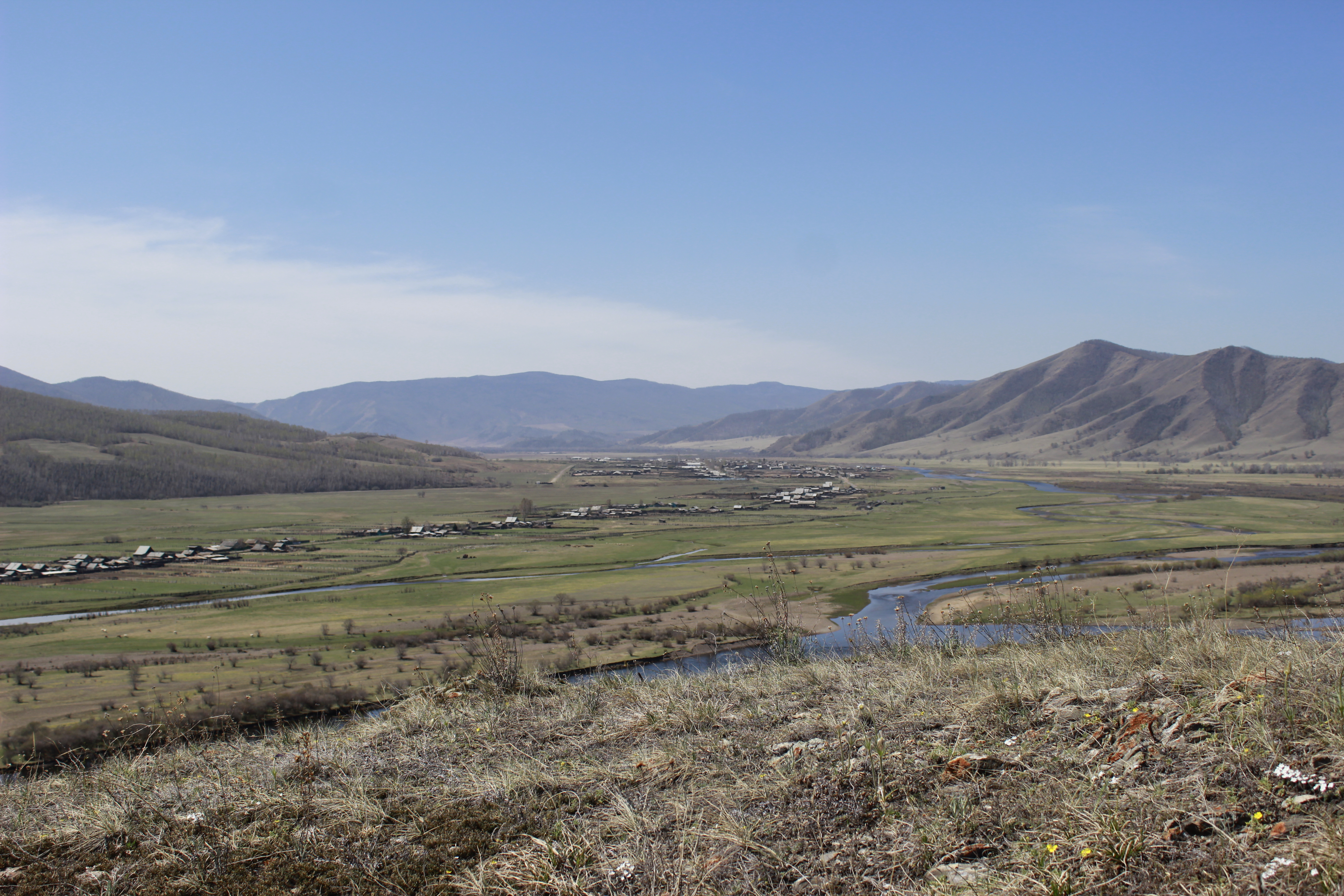
- Native name: Зэлтэрийн гол (Mongolian)

Location
- Country: Mongolia, Russia
- Aimags Republic: Bulgan, Selenge, Republic of Buryatia

Physical characteristics
- Source
  - location: Selenge sum, Bulgan aimag, Mongolia
  - coordinates: 49°54′15″N 104°8′55″E
- Mouth: Dzhida River
  - location: Dzhidinsky District, Republic of Buryatia, Russia
  - coordinates: 50°29′15″N 105°6′40″E

The Zelter River or Zheltura (Mongolian: Зэлтэрийн гол, Zelteriin Gol; Russian: Желтура́) is a river in northern Mongolia and Russia.

It starts in Selenge sum of Bulgan aimag at the confluence of smaller rivers, and runs in a north-eastern direction, largely parallel to the Russian border. At the sum center of Tüshig sum in Selenge aimag it turns north and crosses the border into the Dzhidinsky District of the Republic of Buryatia in Russia. There it discharges into the Dzhida River after a short distance, next to the village Zheltura.
