= Selenge =

Selenge is a geographic name in Mongolia:

- Selenge River in Mongolia (Selenga in Russia)
- Selenge Province, an aimag of Mongolia
- Selenge, Bulgan, a sum (district) in the Bulgan aimag
