= Museum of Bulgan Province =

Museum in Bulgan City, Bulgan Province, Mongolia

- Булган аймгийн музей
- Location: Bulgan City, Bulgan Province, Mongolia
- Coordinates: 48°48′50.4″N 103°31′56.2″E
- Type: museum

The Museum of Bulgan Province (Mongolian: Булган аймгийн музей) is a museum in Bulgan City, Bulgan Province, Mongolia.

== History ==
The museum was established in 1965.

== Exhibitions ==
The museum features an ethnography section. It displays various photos and musical instruments.

== See also ==
- List of museums in Mongolia
