= Khyalganat =

Village in Khangal, Bulgan, Mongolia

Khyalganat Хялганат (Mongolian)
- Village
- Interactive map of Khyalganat
- Coordinates: 49.5072°N 104.2869°E
- Country: Mongolia
- Province: Bulgan
- District: Khangal

Population
  - Estimate (2024): 2,824

Khyalganat (Mongolian: Хялганат) is a village (Mongolian: тосгон) in Khangal, Bulgan Province in northern Mongolia. As of 2024, it has population of 2,824.

== Geography ==
Khyalganat is placed on Selenge river left bank, 25 km North from Khangal district center and 25 km East from Selenge district center. Erdenet city is 60 km South from Khyalganat (via Khangal district center).

== Demographics ==
Historical population
Year	Pop.
2006	3,100
2008	3,264
2021	2,975
2022	2,956
2023	2,822
2024	2,824
Source: / Statistical Office of Bulgan Province

== Economy ==
"Khyalganat" factory was set up in 1972 for the forest logging and sawmilling operations. In the last few years, that industry has not been working to full capacity, thus, the unemployment has increased greatly.

There is a factory in Khyalganat that produces "ECO Lumber Briquettes". These are made from the sawdust waste from the sawmill. These burn longer than standard chopped wood and produce less harmful byproducts than burning coal.
