= Bugat =

- Simplified Chinese: 布嘎特
Transcriptions

Bugat may refer to:

== Places ==
- Bugat, Bayan-Ölgii, western Mongolia
- Bugat, Bulgan, northern Mongolia
- Bugat, Govi-Altai, western Mongolia
- Bugat, the Mongolian name of Baotou, Inner Mongolia

== Other ==
- Bugat (Trojan horse), a computer malware
- Dridex, a banking trojan that is also known as Bugat
