= Uran Togoo - Tulga Uul Natural Monument =

Protected area in Bulgan, Mongolia

Coordinates: 48°59′48″N 102°44′09″E

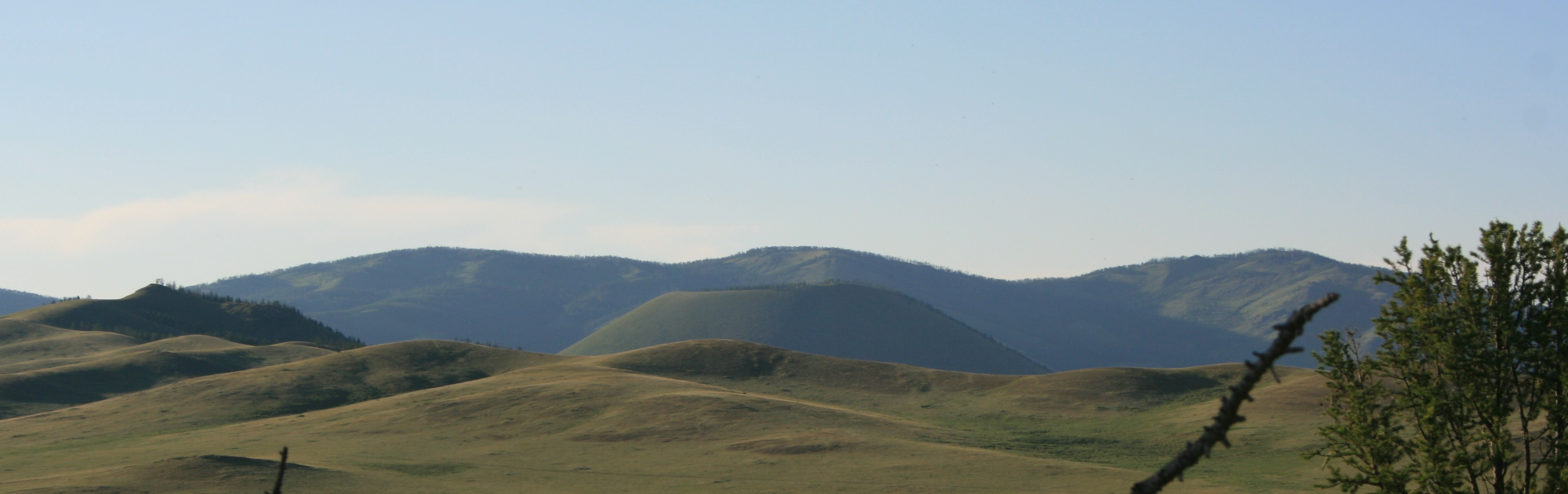
Uran Togoo

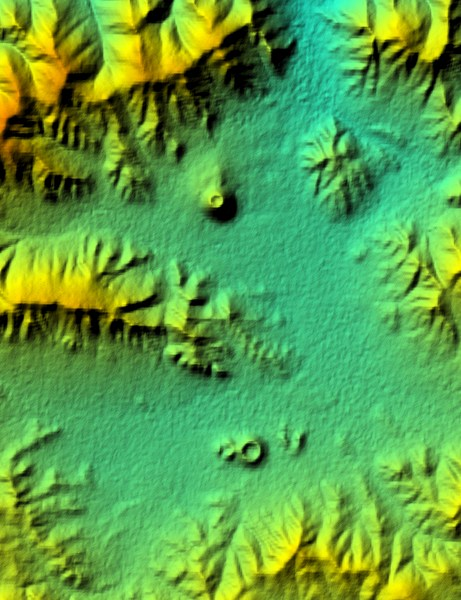
Uran Togoo volcano (in Northern part of image) and Tulga, Togoo, Jalavch volcanoes (in Southern part). Image is a SRTM DEM presentation with 30 m (100 feet) resolution

The Uran Togoo - Tulga Uul Natural Monument (Mongolian: Уран Тогоо - Тулга уулын дурсгалт газар) is a national protected area in the Bulgan Province of Mongolia. It is located about 60 km directly west of Bulgan city around the extinct volcanoes Uran Togoo, Tulga, Togoo, and Jalavch Uul.

All four mountain names allude to their volcanic past with designations borrowed from around the fireplace. The Uran Togoo and Togoo mountains are named for their bowl shape, the Tulga mountain for its three mounds reminding of the traditional iron tripod kettle support. Jalavch is a term for a small pot.

The area is situated in the Khutag-Öndör district of Bulgan Province. A smaller area was initially protected in 1965 by State Great Khural Resolution No. 17. In 1995, it was designated as a monument by Parliament Resolution No. 26 with an area of 5,800 hectares.

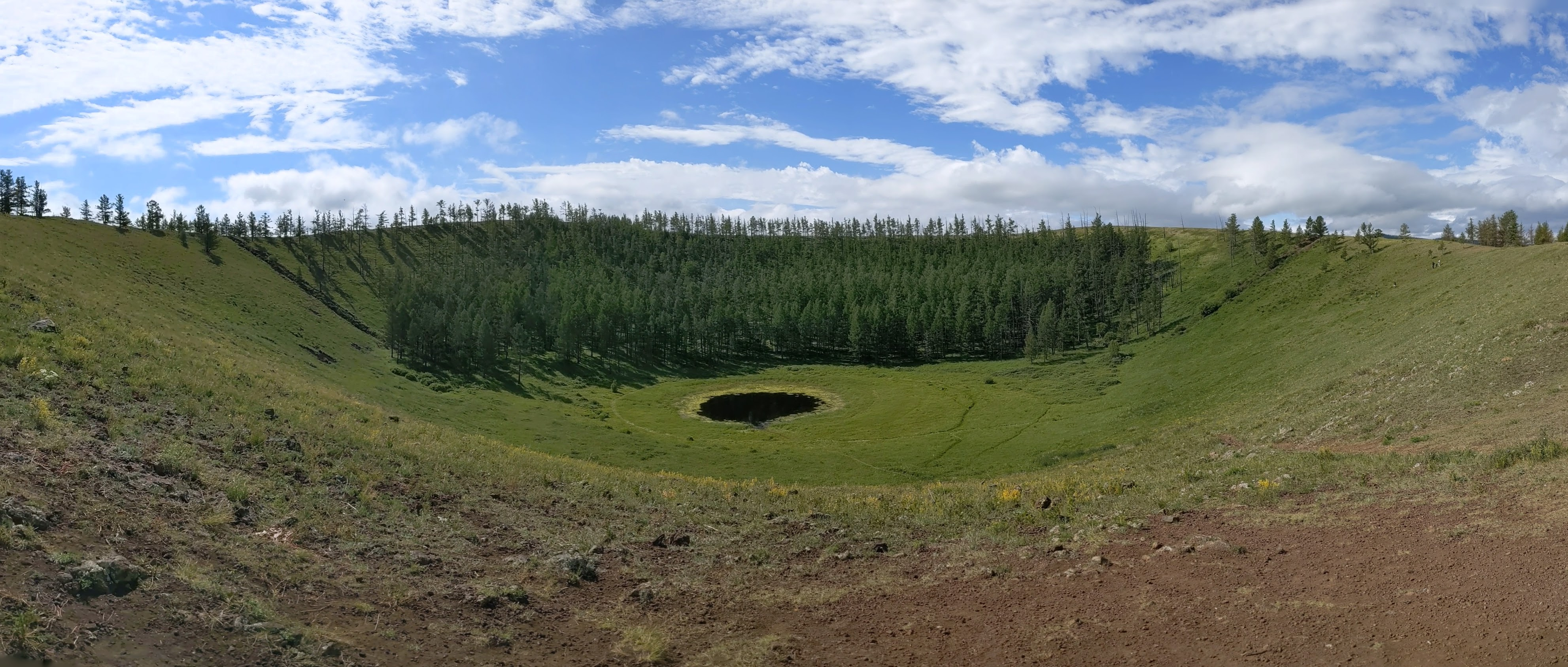
Uran Togoo volcano caldera
