= Orkhon =

Orkhon (Mongolian: Орхон) may refer to:

- Orkhon River, Mongolia
- Orkhon Valley, the landscape around the Orkhon river
- Orkhon Province, an Aimag (province) in Mongolia
- several Sums (districts) in different Mongolian Aimags:
  - Orkhon, Bulgan
  - Orkhon, Darkhan-Uul
  - Orkhon, Selenge
- Orkhon script, a historic script of Turkic origin
- Orkhon inscriptions, Old Turkic inscriptions
- Orhun (name), list of people named the Turkish version of Orkhon
- Orkhoe, the Greek word for Uruk, a prominent Sumerian city-state
