= Zelter =

Zelter is a German language surname, which means "palfrey", a type of riding horse. Notable individuals with this surname include:

- Angie Zelter (born 1951), British political activist
- Carl Friedrich Zelter (1758–1832), German musician

== See also ==
- 15808 Zelter, a main-belt asteroid
- Zelter-Plakette, a German award for choirs
- Zelter River, Mongolia and Russia
