= Büregkhangai =

District in Bulgan Province, Mongolia

Coordinates: 48°15′07″N 103°52′35″E

Büregkhangai District Бүрэгхангай сум ᠪᠦᠷᠦᠭᠬᠠᠩᠭᠠᠢᠰᠤᠮᠤ
- District
- Interactive map of Büregkhangai District
- Country: Mongolia
- Province: Bulgan Province

Area
  - Total: 3,497 km^{2} (1,350 sq mi)
- Time zone: UTC+8 (UTC + 8)

Büregkhangai (Mongolian: Бүрэгхангай) is a sum (district) of Bulgan Province in northern Mongolia. In 2009, its population is 2,406.

== Geography ==
The district has a total area of 3,497 km^{2}.

== Administrative divisions ==
The district is divided into four bags, which are:

- Bumbat
- Darkhan
- Derst
- Tsakht
