= Tsagaan Puntsag =

Mongolian businessman, international lawyer, economist, and a former politician

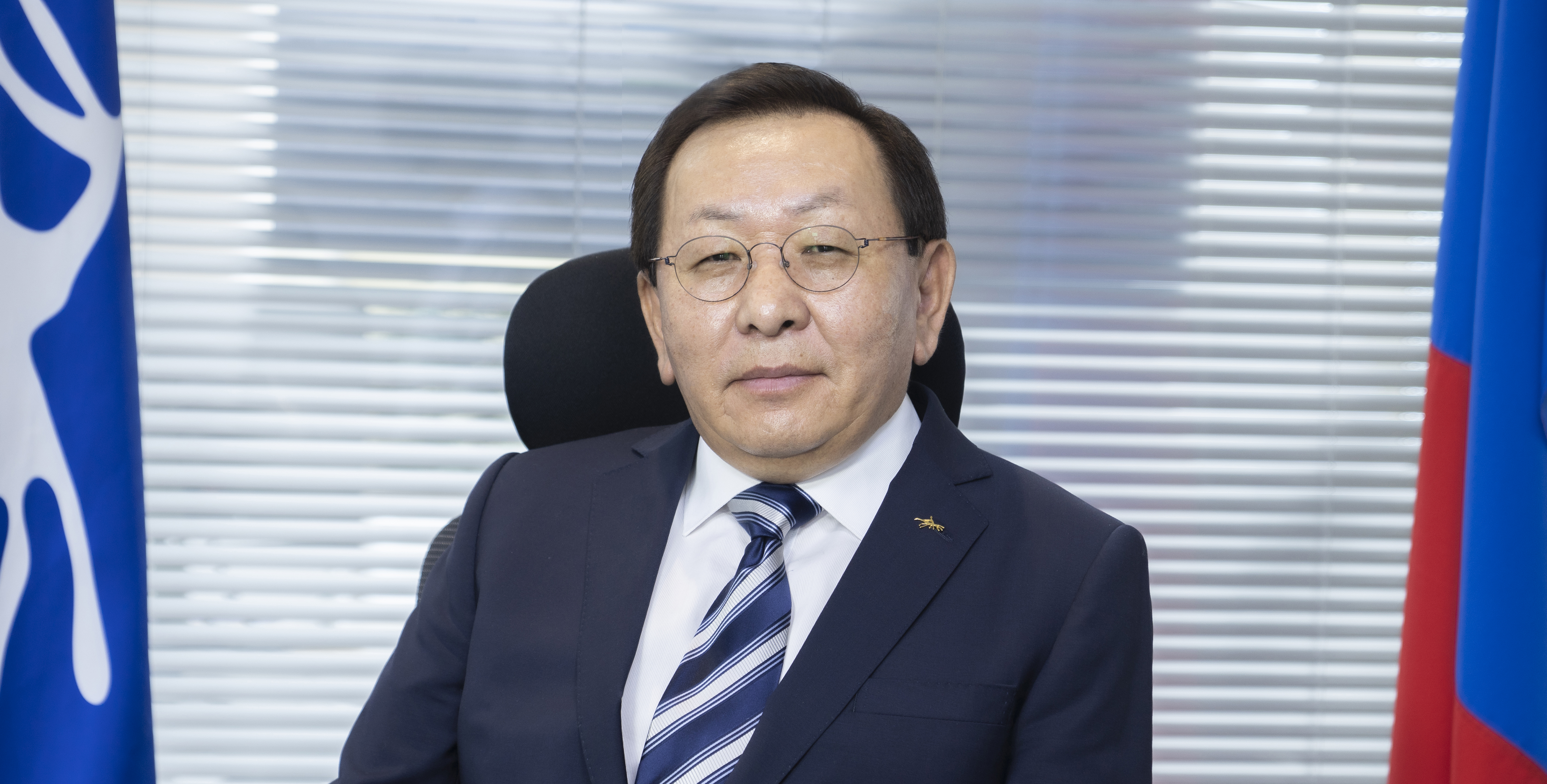
- Born: April 4, 1959 (age 67); Bulgan Soum of Bayan-Ölgii province Mongolia
- Education: Law College Ulaanbaatar, Moscow State Institute of International Relations, National University of Mongolia
- Occupations: Entrepreneur; international lawyer; economist; philanthropist, and a former politician
- Spouse: Erdenetsetseg Dayandorj
- Children: 2

Tsagaan Puntsag (Mongolian: Пунцагийн Цагаан; also referred to as Puntsagiin Tsagaan; born 4 April 1959) is a Mongolian entrepreneur, international lawyer, economist, philanthropist, and a former politician.

He served as the Minister of Education, Culture, and Science of Mongolia from 2004 to 2006, and chairman of the board of Economic Policy and Competitiveness Research Center since 2010. He is the president of the Mongolian Archery Association and in 2016 was awarded the Khublai Khan Gold Medal by the Mongolian Academy of Sciences.

== Early life and education ==
Puntsag Tsagaan was born in Bulgan Soum of Bayan-Ölgii province in 1959. He attended secondary school No.21 of the capital city, 1966–1976, and the Law College Ulaanbaatar between 1976 and 1979. He is an alumnus of Moscow State Institute of International Relations with an international law degree. Puntsag received an MA degree in law from the National University of Mongolia in 1999.

Puntsag completed professional development courses at The Hague Academy of International Law, and International Monetary Fund Training Institute in Tokyo. In 1992, he attended the Maastricht School of Governance. Tsagaan went to George Washington University in 1994 as a visiting researcher, studying constitutional law, national security, finance, economics, and human rights. He completed a short-term course at Wharton School of Business, researching foreign investment at the United States Library of Congress, and worked as a visiting researcher at Georgetown University.

== Career ==
Tsagaan Puntsag worked as an Officer and Chief Coordinator at the Confederation of Mongolian Trade Unions between 1985 and 1990. And delegated the Mongolian workers at the International Labour Organization and actively worked to bring Mongolian laws and regulations in line with international standards and norms.

From 1990 to 1992, he worked as a legal assistant to Chimid Byaraa, the secretary of the State Baga Hural (Parliament) and Secretary-General of the Parliament Secretariat, drafting the New Constitution and contributing to Mongolia's social reform.

Tsagaan served in the Government of the Prime Minister of Mongolia, Dashiin Byambasuren, as Deputy Minister of Labour in 1992; as Assistant in charge of Parliamentary Affairs for Mongolia's first democratically elected president Punsalmaa Ochirbat between 1992 and 1995.

During the years of 1995–1996, Tsagaan Puntsag worked at Mongolia's very first commercial bank – Golomt Bank, as its first director-general. From 1996 to 1998, he was the Minister of Finance. He implemented radical economic and financial reforms such as liberalizing the base price, dissolving insolvent banks, reviving privatization, free privatization of housing, counting and registering the state properties, zero-rated the customs duties and started the shift to a five-day workweek. From 1998 to 2000, he was the head of the Democratic Party's Political Department and advised the Government.

From 2000 to 2004, Puntsag worked in the private sector, and during the period between 2004 and 2006, he became a Member of the Government of Mongolia and worked as the Minister of Education, Culture, and Science, and developed a strategy to reform this sector and implemented numerous programs. The initial decisions were made to establish the Kharakhorum Museum and the Central Museum of Dinosaurs during his time as the Minister of Education, Culture, and Science.

Tsagaan worked as the advisor to the Democratic Party Caucus in the Parliament during 2006–2008; and during 2009–2016, advisor on energy and mineral resources; legal policy advisor; senior advisor to the president of Mongolia; chief of staff of the president of Mongolia and has been both proactive and productive in ensuring national security, expanding foreign relations, deepening judicial reform, and advancing Mongolian studies.

During his tenure as the chief of staff of the president of Mongolia, Puntsag successfully managed and led the repatriation effort of 70 million-year-old dinosaur skeleton T-bataar - Tarbosaurus bataar, which was smuggled out of Mongolia, falling a victim of international cross-border trafficking and which was sold at the New York Heritage Auction for $1 million.

Tsagaan Puntsag played a leading role in successfully organizing the 11th Asia-Europe Meeting Summit (ASEM11) in July 2016, in Ulaanbaatar, chairing the working group in charge of the conference venue, accommodation, and hotels.

In August 2016, Puntsag left the political life altogether upon quitting from his post as chief of staff of the President of Mongolia, at his request.

He is the founder and the chairman of the board of the Center for Economic Policy and Competitiveness Research since 2010.

== Business ==
Steppe Copper LLC

Since departing from politics in August 2016, he has been working in business and the social sector. He works as the executive director of Steppe Copper LLC, which specializes in foreign trade, business consulting, and project development management.

Achit Ikht LLC

Mongolia's modern hydrometallurgical plant, Achit Ikht

Tsagaan is the founder and a shareholder of his family business Achit Ikht LLC. The company's cathode copper plant is Mongolia's modern hydrometallurgical plant that extracts cathode copper and is built by private investors. It is equipped with the most advanced Leaching – Solvent Extraction – Electrowinning /L-SX-EW/ equipment to process the off-balance mixed ore. The cathode copper plant of the company has created more than 230 workplaces in the local region and has paid around MNT 219.9 billion in taxes to the State budget. Moreover, the company has been awarded “Top 100 companies of Mongolia” for the fourth time.

Achit Ikht LLC joined the London Metal Exchange on January 23, 2019, becoming the first Mongolian company to do so.

Achit Ikht has started issuing preferred shares and paying dividends to its targeted beneficiaries, the company's employees, and the employees of Erdenet Mining Corporation, since 2018, as part of its social responsibility – with a motto “Resource Benefits for All Employees”. The company's preference shares have a guaranteed interest rate of 30 percent per annum, which is 2 times higher than an interest of term deposit and 4 times than the interest of current savings. In June 2021, it has paid its 11th quarterly dividends to its preferred shareholders on time despite the country's difficult economic situation due to the coronavirus pandemic that has lasted for more than a year.

Steppe Arena LLC

He is the founder and the chairman of the board of Steppe Arena LLC. The company has built Mongolia's first indoor multi-purpose ice rink Steppe Arena

Steppe Arena was awarded Best Public Service Development – Mongolia 2021 by the International Property Awards, and on February 25, 2022, it was also awarded the Best Public Service Development – Asia Pacific 2021 by the Asia Pacific Property Awards.

In March 2022, Tsagaan Puntsag, the chairman of the Board of Steppe Arena LLC, met with Brad Mayne, the President of the International Association of Venue Managers (IAVM) in Dallas, and joined the Association as its member.

Steppe Metal Powder LLC

He is the founder and shareholder of Steppe Metal Powder LLC, which was established in 2017.

Steppe Solar LLC

Steppe Solar LLC was established to reduce air pollution and introduce renewable energy techniques and technologies, at the initiative of Tsagaan in November 2008, becoming the very first renewable energy company in Mongolia. In January 2009, it expanded into a science and production company.

Steppe Hotel Tsagaan is the founder and investor of Steppe Hotel in Khovd province. The construction of the hotel started in May 2017 and officially started operations on May 30, 2018. and offers modern solutions and innovative design. It is considered to be one of few such establishments built in the remote western region, especially at the rural level, bringing investment and benefits.

The construction work was carried out by “Khotol Ord” LLC, the interior design by “Lide Partners” LLC, and the “Steppe Solar” LLC performed the outdoor lighting and hot water system, using solar thermal energy. Also, sculptor and artist A.Chadraabal painted the art based on the great Altai mountains and petroglyphs; and created a sculpture “Steed of Tengri”, set outside the hotel.

Steppe Hotel was awarded the “Best New Job Creator” award by the Agency for Labor, Welfare and Services of Khovd province in 2018.

== Books and publications ==
An avid reader, and history and art enthusiast, Tsagaan founded Steppe Publishing LLC in 2017. The publishing house published about 20 books since its inception, mainly focusing on history, arts, culture, and folklore, such as: "Latin-English-Russian-Mongolian Dictionary of Law", "Laws and Regulations of the Khalkha and Oirats", "Heritage of Mongolian Book and Scripture", "Million Days of Mongolia", "History of the Mongol Empire – 5 Volumes", "Stone Chronicles of Mongol Altai", "Anthology of Darkhad songs", "Oral wisdom of Hövsgöl Uriankhais", "Anthology of Khotgoid songs", "Anthology of Hövsgöl Buryat songs", "White stead of Darkhad", "Shishgid Chronicles, Humorist Darkhad", "An illustration of the oral wisdom of Altai Uriankhais", and on. In 2020, the five-volume history book “History of the Mongol Empire” was selected as the best work of the year.

Tsagaan supported and implemented the “Great Dictionary of the Mongolian Language” project by the researchers from the Institute of Linguistics of the Mongolian Academy of Sciences. He also supported the translation effort of Rashid-Ad-Din's “Jāmiʿ al-tawārīkh” into Mongolian.

Published Articles

- "Global Development Trends and Mongolia's Double Threshold", 1997
- "Mongolia in 2050", 1999
- "Without a long-term goal, suffering will be imminent - 1", 2015
- “Without a long-term goal, suffering will be imminent - 2 or Reflections on Statehood”, 2015
- Without long-term goals, suffering will be imminent - 3 or Reflections on Elections", 2015
- "Map of Mongolia in Historical Studies", 2016
- "Investment Environment and Ways to Improve It", 2016
- “Let’s elect the presidential candidate as we elected the party leader”, 2017
- “The Contrast between Japanese and Mongolian Bosses”, 2017
- “Limit the privileges of the boss! Promote civil rights!”, 2018
- “On the problems of enhancing the competitiveness of the Mongolian economy”, 2018
- "Chairman Chimid and Me" memoir, 2019
- "Corporate raiding and Mongolia", 2020

== Professional degree ==
Tsagaan is a Doctor of Economics (Ph.D.). He successfully defended his thesis “Approaches on Improving the Competitiveness of Mongolia”, on July 6, 2018.

The Economic Policy and Competitiveness Research Center (ECRC) he chairs released Mongolia's first competitiveness report “Mongolia in World Competitiveness Report” in 2010 and has since released 5 annual reports; and started conducting quarterly bank competition, and monthly macroeconomic surveys. In 2013, the Center started conducting competitiveness reports for rural provinces and, city district reports were done for the third time in 2021.

The Center joined the Global Federation of Competitiveness Council in 2012; and hosted numerous panel discussions in conjunction with local and international organizations such as the Swiss-based International Institute for Management Development, and Think Tanks and Civil Society Program – of the University of Pennsylvania.

== Elected positions ==
He holds elected titles such as Member of the World Economic Forum; Member of the Board of the UNESCO Institute for Information Technologies in Education in Moscow; Member of the International Union for Prehistoric and Protohistoric Sciences, Member of the Board of the Arts Council of Mongolia, president of the Mongolian Archery Association, Member of the Democratic Party's National Policy Committee. He is also a former member of the Board of American University of Mongolia.

He was the president of the “Alumni Association of the Moscow University of International Relations” NGO during 2016 and 2021.

== Sports ==
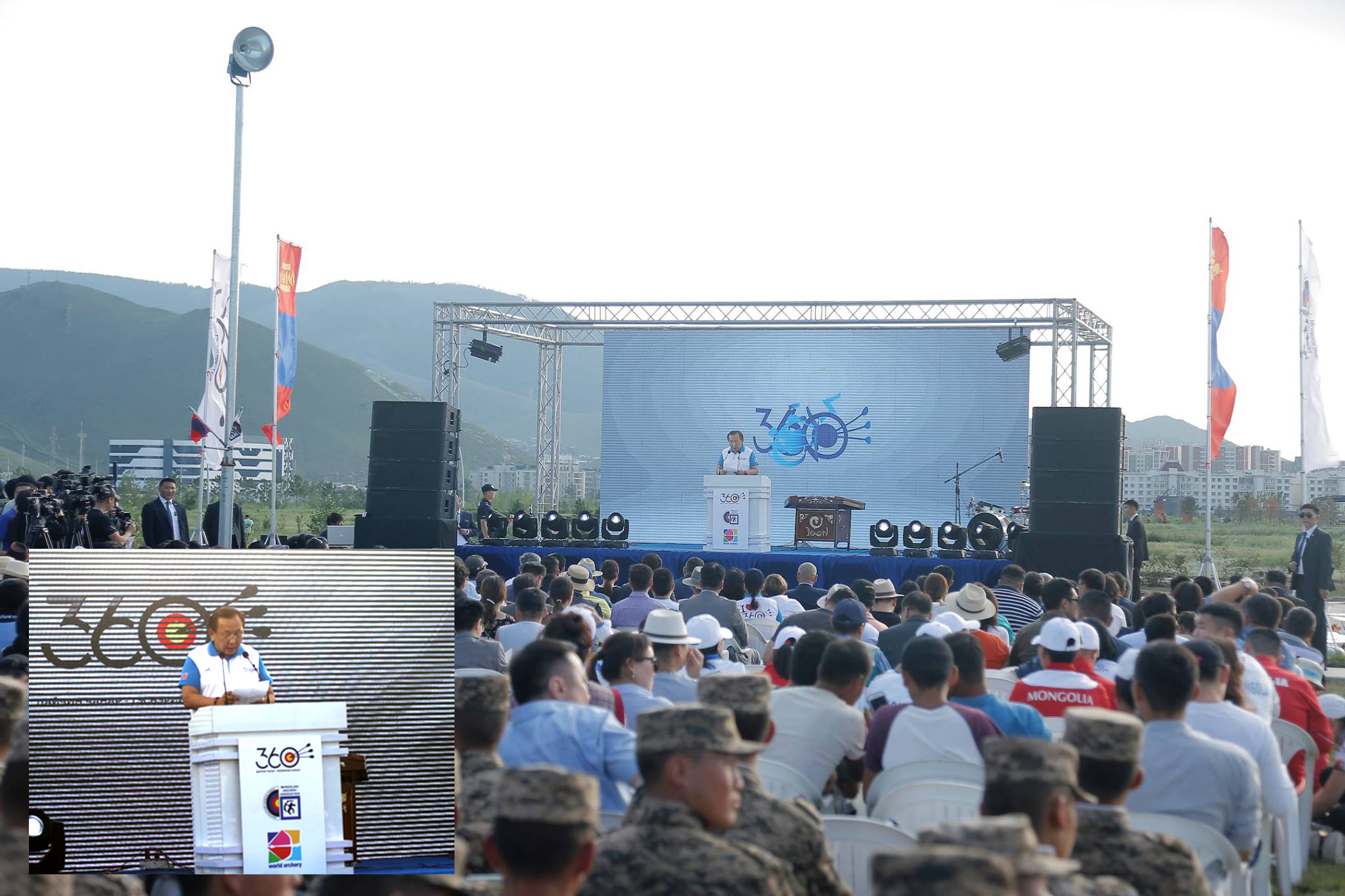
Opening ceremony of the "360 Archery Field"

He is a devoted archery fan as his father, Puntsag Luuzan, taught him archery at an early age. He holds the position of the president of the Mongolian Archery Association since June 2014. The Association has 19 clubs and 6 branch associations.

During his presidency of the association, a dedicated archery field for both elite and amateur athletes opened in the Mongolian capital of Ulaanbaatar, at his initiative. The field, named 360, was opened on 1 August 2018 and can support 32 targets at up to 90 meters.

== Recognition and awards ==
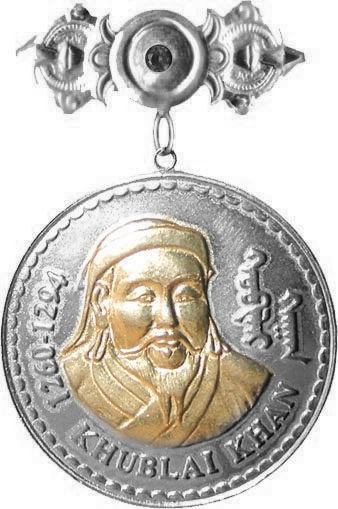

In 2016, Tsagaan was awarded the Khublai Khan Gold Medal by the Mongolian Academy of Sciences in recognition of his contribution to the development of science, and research, preservation, and inheritance of Mongolian language, script, culture, history, and national art.

Tsagaan, as a president of the Mongolian Archery Association, was awarded the "Best President of Sports Association - 2018" for his initiation and support of implementation efforts of the "360 Archery field".

He was also rewarded the “Order of Merit” by the Moscow State Institute of International Relations of the Ministry of Foreign Affairs of the Russian Federation in October 2019.

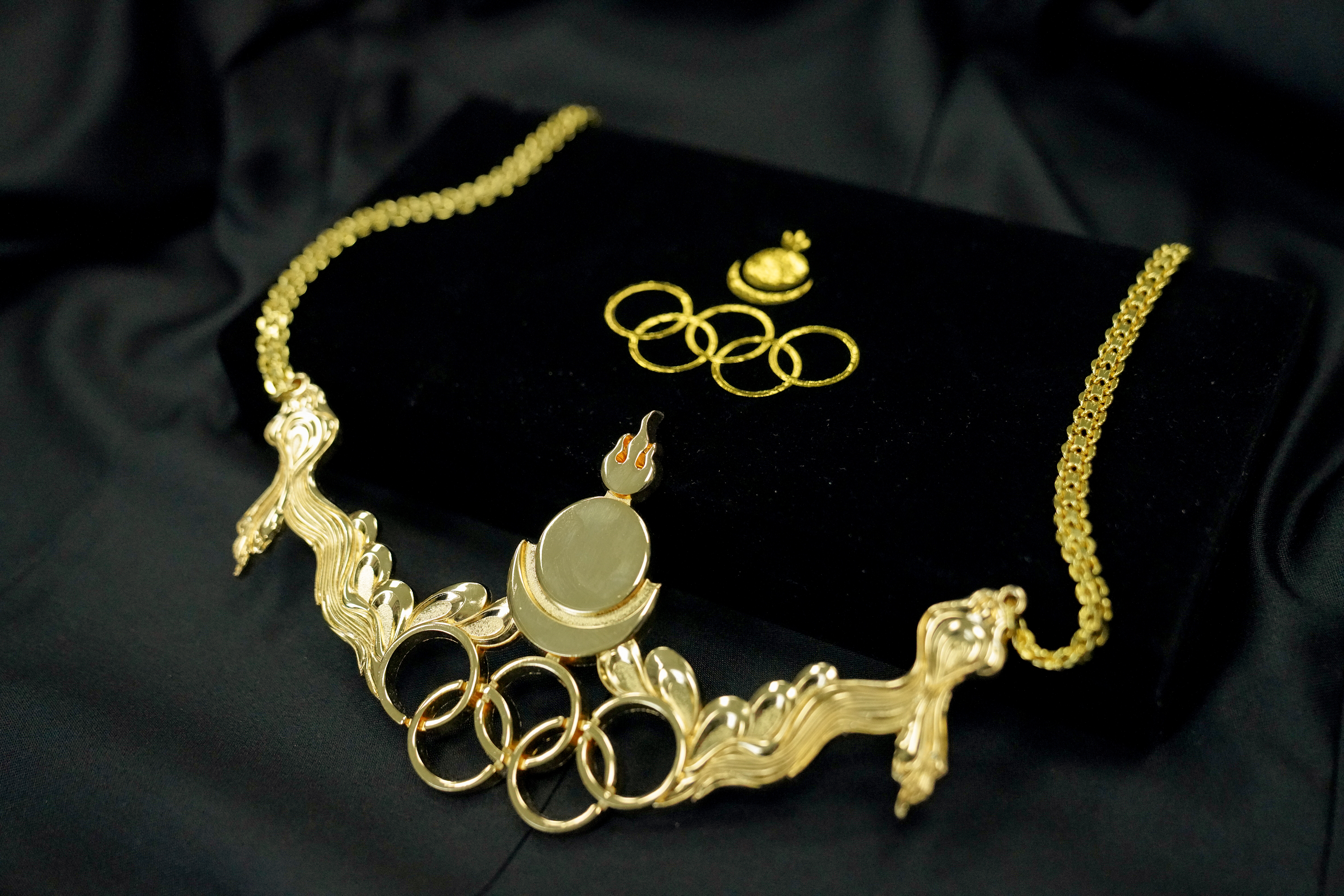
Golden Star Award of the Mongolian National Olympic Committee

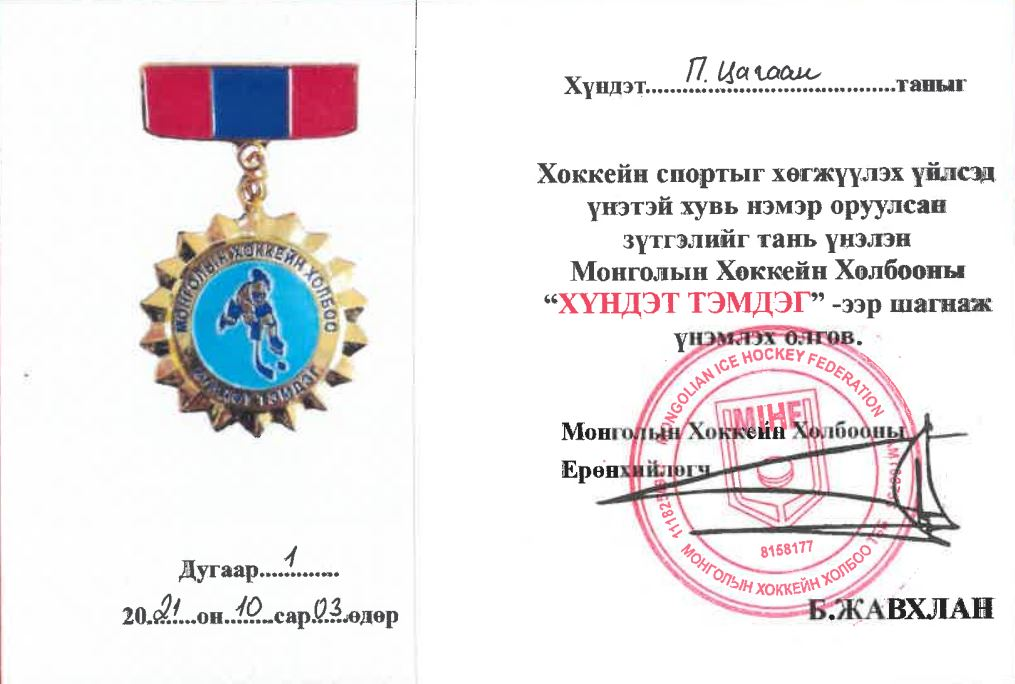
Badge of Honour - Mongolian Ice Hockey Federation

At the 2021 Web Awards Mongolia, Mr. Tsagaan Puntsag was bestowed with the Meritorious Citizen Supporting Social Development Award, jointly awarded by the Mongolian Web Site Association, the Mongolian Union of Journalists, the Communications and Information Technology Authority, and the Communications Regulatory Commission. The awarding organizations honored Mr. Tsagaan's contributions to Mongolia's socio-economic development by establishing and leading the Economic Policy and Competitiveness Research Center (EPCRC). For more than 10 years, the EPCRC has conducted research, analysis, and reporting on Mongoliancompetitiveness at national, provincial, and district levels. As a result, the EPCRC has provided a valuable reflection of Mongolia's economic and social development over time. In addition, Mr. Tsagaan led a project to build a modern archery field called “Archery - 360” that meets international standards. More recently, Mr. Tsagaan initiated and managed the construction of Mongolia's first-ever indoor ice rink and multipurpose complex, the Steppe Arena, which meets International Olympic Committee standards. Steppe Arena was built and commissioned in a rapid timeframe and with the support of socially responsible Mongolian private companies.

In recognition of his contribution to the dissemination of the Olympic movement and the development of sports in Mongolia, the Mongolian National Olympic Committee awarded him its highest award - the Golden Star, in February 2022.

Also, on October 3, 2021, the Mongolian Hockey Federation awarded him the Badge of Honour in recognition of his contribution to the development of Ice Hockey in Mongolia.
