= Rashaant, Bulgan =

District in Bulgan Province, Mongolia

Coordinates: 47°22′34″N 103°57′03″E

Rashaant District Рашаант сум ᠷᠠᠰᠢᠶ᠋ᠠᠨᠲᠤᠰᠤᠮᠤ
- District
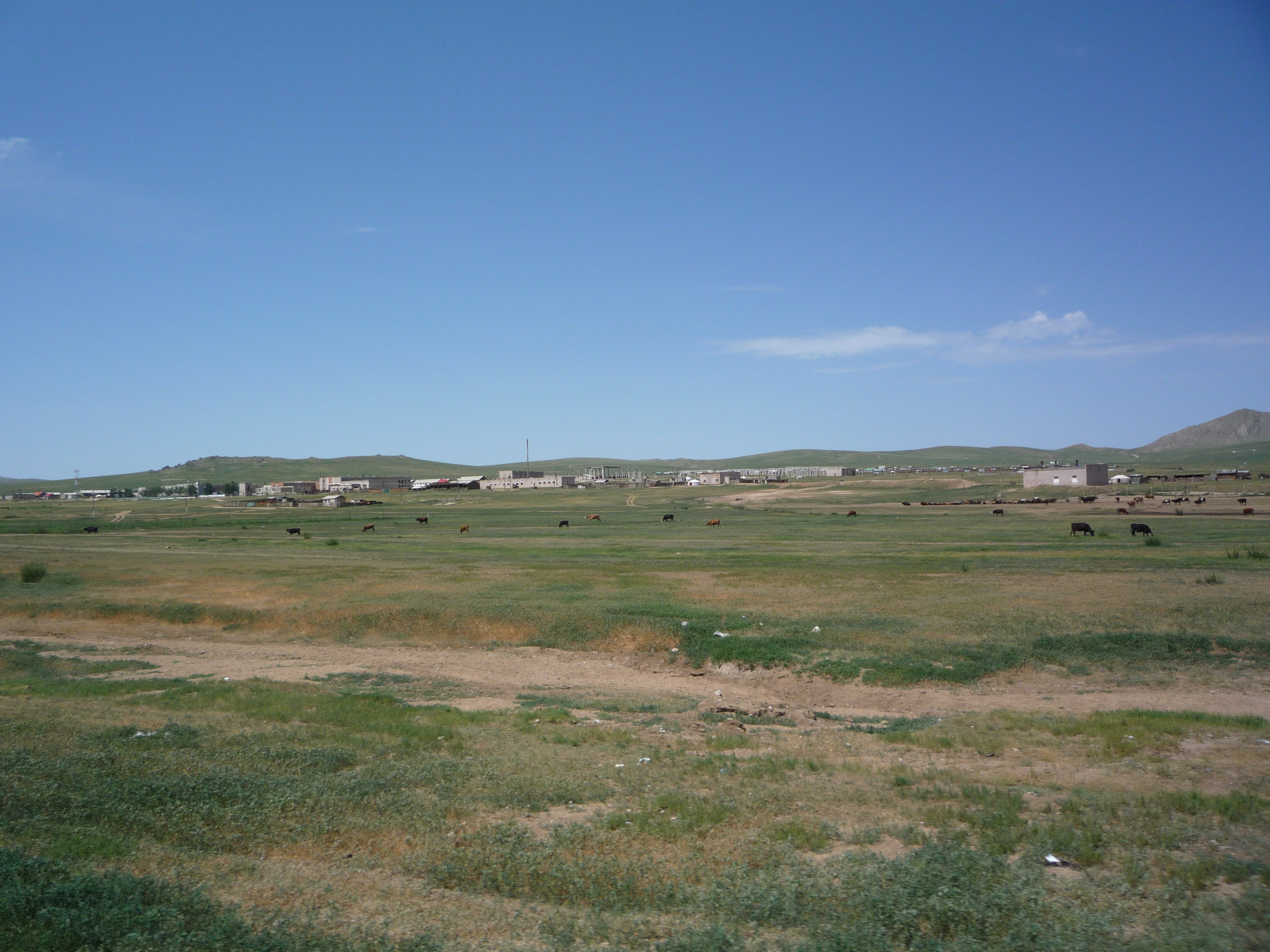
- Sum center
- Interactive map of Rashaant District
- Country: Mongolia
- Province: Bulgan Province

Area
  - Total: 1,012 km^{2} (391 sq mi)
- Time zone: UTC+8 (UTC + 8)

Rashaant (Mongolian: Рашаант) is a sum (district) of Bulgan Province in northern Mongolia. In 2009, its population was 3,131.

== Geography ==
The district has a total area of 1,012 km^{2}.

== Administrative divisions ==
The district is divided into four bags, which are:

- Argal Khairkhan
- Khar Chuluut
- Khugnu Khan
- Ulaan Shiveet
