= Khürelbaataryn Bulgantuya =

Mongolian politician (born 1981)

- Хүрэлбаатарын Булгантуяa

Member of the State Great Khural
- Incumbent
- Assumed office 30 June 2020
- Constituency: 8th, Bayanzürkh District (2024–2028); 23rd, Bayanzürkh District (2020–2024)

Deputy Chairwoman of the State Great Khural
- In office 1 August 2024 – 30 October 2025
- Chairman: Dashzegviin Amarbayasgalan
- Preceded by: Lkhagvyn Mönkhbaatar; Saldangiin Odontuyaa
- Succeeded by: Jadambyn Bat-Erdene

Personal details
- Born: 3 February 1981 (age 45) Tsetserleg, Arkhangai, Mongolia
- Party: Mongolian People's Party
- Education: National University of Mongolia; Huazhong University of Science and Technology (BA); Yale University (MA)
- Profession: Economist

Khürelbaataryn Bulgantuya (Mongolian: Хүрэлбаатарын Булгантуяа; born 3 February 1981) is a Mongolian politician who is a member of the State Great Khural. She served as deputy chairwoman of the State Great Khural from 2024 to 2025 before being removed. She chairs the parliamentary sub-committee on sustainable development goals and has worked as deputy chairperson of the Mongolian People’s Party caucus in parliament.

== Early life and education ==
Bulgantuya was born in Tsetserleg, the capital of Arkhangai Province, on 3 February 1981. She went to the "Mongolian-Turkish" high school from 1997 to 1998.

After completing her high school in Australia. She obtained a B.A. in Economics from Huazhong University of Science and Technology in 2006, and an M.A. in International and Development Economics from Yale University in 2008. She has worked internationally as a consultant on World Bank projects in East Timor and Palestine on improving public financial management. She speaks Chinese and English.

== Political career ==
She joined the Mongolian People's Party (MPP) as a party member in 2009, kickstarting her political career.

Bulgantuya serves as a member of the board of the MPP and a number of women’s and youth organisations of the MPP. She served as a Secretary of the Mongolian People’s Party in charge of party structure, international relations, and non-government institutions. She has worked in the private sector as Director of the Business Development Department of Petrovis LLC, Project Manager and Commercial Principal Advisor at Oyu Tolgoi LLC.

Prior to her election as MP in 2020, she worked as the Vice Minister of Finance of Mongolia from 2016 to 2020, overseeing Mongolia's macroeconomic and financial policies, budgetary and investment policies. She was elected twice as MP from Bayanzürkh District in Ulaanbaatar in the 2020 parliamentary election and the 2024 parliamentary election.
