= Orhun (name) =

Orhun is a Turkish masculine given name and a surname. Notable people with the name include:

== Given name ==
- Orhun Ene (born 1967), Turkish basketball player

== Surname ==
- Deniz Orhun (born 1974), Turkish chef, media personality and businesswoman

== See also ==
- Orkhon, disambiguation page
