= Bayannuur, Bulgan =

District in Bulgan Province, Mongolia

Bayannuur District Mongolian: Баяннуур сум ᠪᠠᠶ᠋ᠠᠨ ᠨᠠᠭᠤᠷᠰᠤᠮᠤ
- District
- Location in Mongolia
- Coordinates: 47°49′49″N 104°26′28″E
- Country: Mongolia
- Province: Bulgan Province

Area
  - Total: 960.07 km^{2} (370.69 sq mi)

Population (2009)
  - Total: 1,526
- Time zone: UTC+8 (UTC + 8)

Bayanuur (Mongolian: Баяннуур, Mongolian: rich lake) is a sum (district) of Bulgan Province in northern Mongolia. In 2009, its population was 1,526.

== Geography ==
The district has a total area of 960.07 square kilometres (370.69 sq mi).

== Administrative divisions ==
The district is divided into three bags, which are:

- Khan Shakhait
- Shar Tal
- Ulziit
