= Bayan-Agt =

District in Bulgan Province, Mongolia

Coordinates: 49°02′20″N 102°05′03″E

Bayan-Agt District Баян-Агт сум ᠪᠠᠶ᠋ᠠᠨᠠᠭᠲᠠᠰᠤᠮᠤ
- District
- Interactive map of Bayan-Agt District
- Country: Mongolia
- Province: Bulgan Province

Area
  - Total: 3,079 km^{2} (1,189 sq mi)
- Time zone: UTC+8 (UTC + 8)

Bayan-Agt (Mongolian: Баян-Агт) is a sum (district) of Bulgan Province in northern Mongolia. In 2009, its population was 3,048.

== Geography ==
The district has a total area of 3,079 km^{2}.

== Administrative divisions ==
The district is divided into six bags, which are:

- Bayankhairkhan
- Bayanzurkh
- Dulaankhaan
- Khaltar
- Khuremt
- Sharga
