= Khangal =

District in Bulgan Province, Mongolia

Coordinates: 49°19′11″N 104°23′05″E

Khangal District Хангал сум ᠬᠠᠩᠭ᠋ᠠᠯᠰᠤᠮᠤ
- District
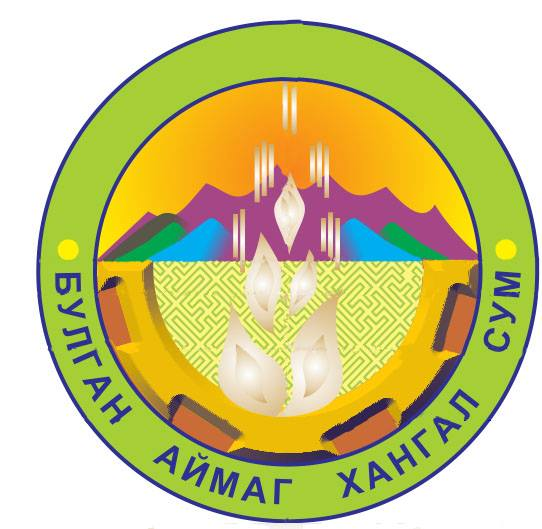
- Seal

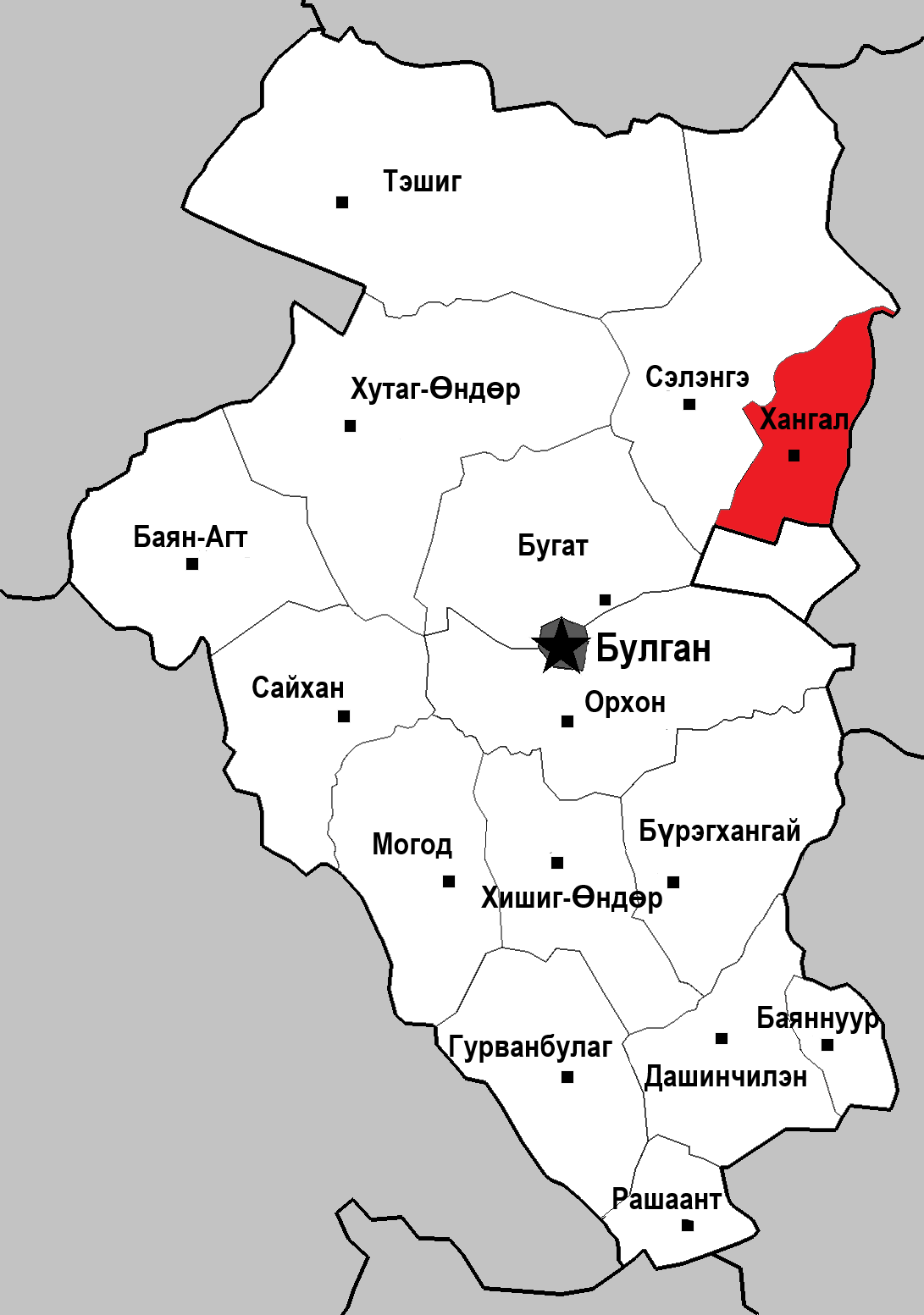
- Khangal District in Bulgan Province
- Country: Mongolia
- Province: Bulgan Province

Area
  - Total: 1,600 km^{2} (620 sq mi)
- Time zone: UTC+8 (UTC + 8)

Khangal (Mongolian: Хангал) is a sum (district) of Bulgan Province in northern Mongolia. The urban-type settlement (village) Khyalganat is located approximately 25 kilometres (16 mi) north from Khangal sum center. In 2009, its population was 4,700.

== Geography ==
The district has a total area of 1,600 km^{2}.

== Notable people ==
- Anandyn Amar (1886-1941) - Head of State
