= Bulgan (city) =

District and provincial capital of Bulgan Province, Mongolia

Bulgan Булган ᠪᠤᠯᠠᠭᠠᠨ
- District
- Bulgan District; Булган сум ᠪᠤᠯᠠᠭᠠᠨᠰᠤᠮᠤ
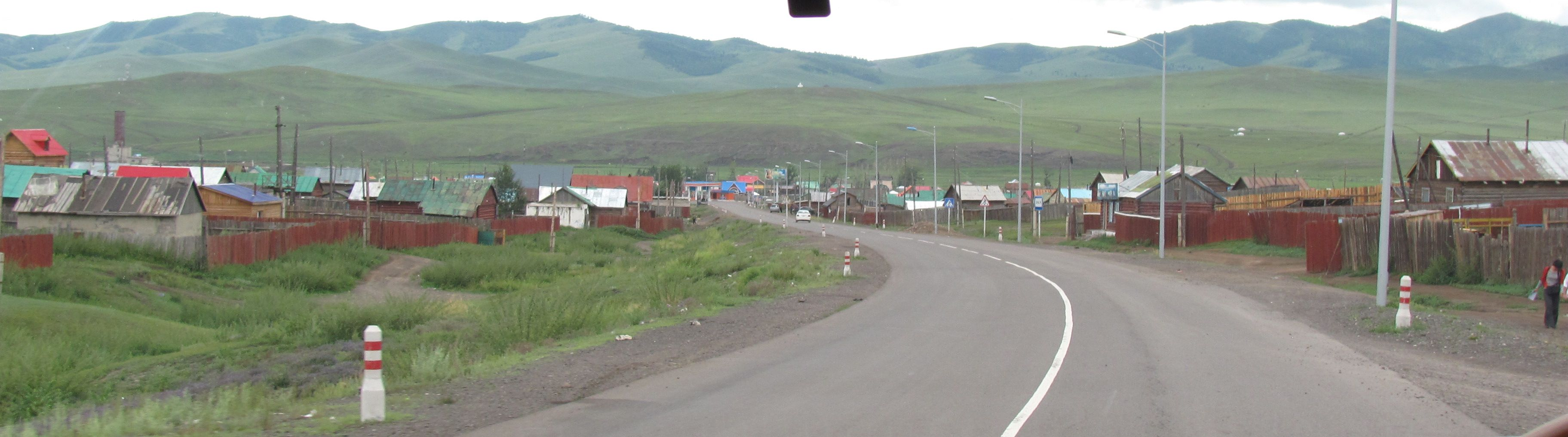
- High street

- Location in Mongolia
- Coordinates: 48°48′43″N 103°32′01″E
- Country: Mongolia
- Province: Bulgan Province
- Subprovince: Utah
- Arrondissement: Paca
- Subarrondissement: Ia

Area
  - District: 99.95 km^{2} (38.59 sq mi)
- Elevation: 1,208 m (3,963 ft)

Population (2008)
  - District: 18,494
  - Density: 185.0/km^{2} (479.2/sq mi)
  - Urban: 11,198
- Climate: Dwc

Bulgan (Mongolian: Булган "sable") is a town which is the administrative centre of Bulgan Province of Mongolia. Bulgan sum has a population of 11,984 (2005, town proper 10,878), 12,323 (2008), town proper has a population of 11,198 (2008). It is located at the site of the former Daichin Wangiin Khüree monastery at an elevation of 1,208 metres (3,963 ft) and 468 kilometres (291 mi) from Ulaanbaatar.

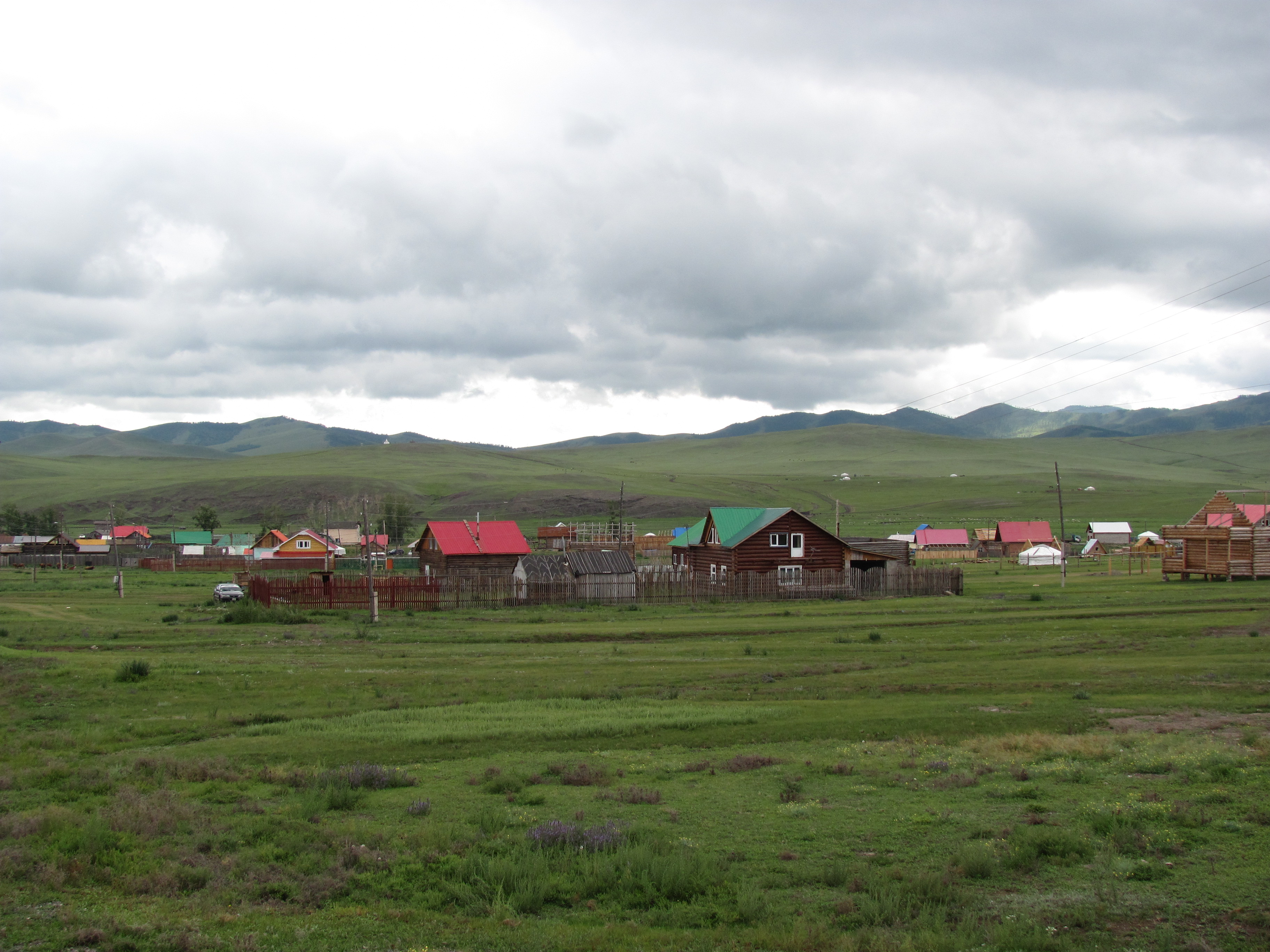
Residential area.

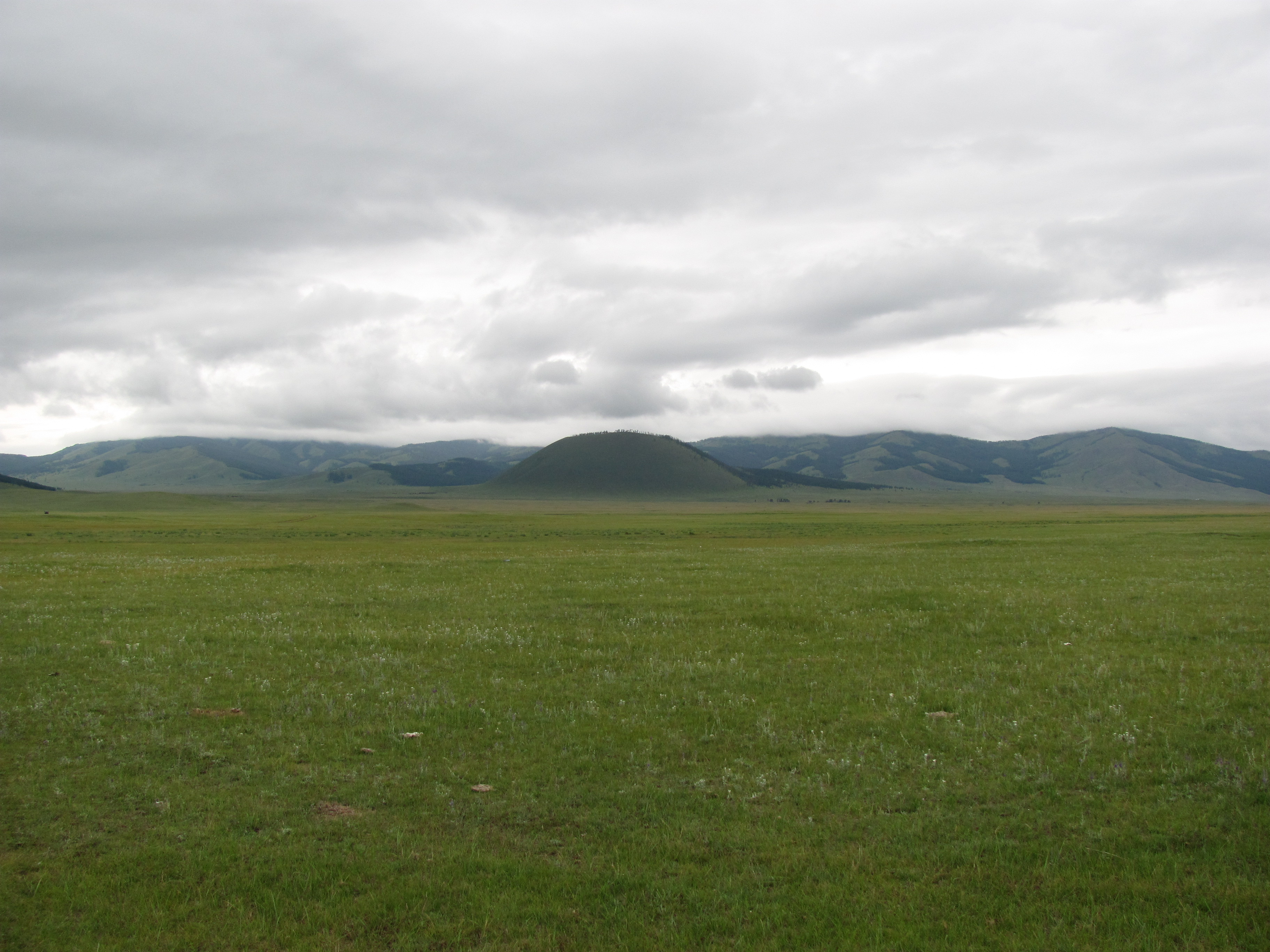
View to Uran Uul.

== History ==
Bulgan was founded in 1938.

== Sights ==
A former military point in the south of Bulgan, which was founded in 1921, was transformed into a museum. One of its buildings, which was used as a shop before 1921, dates from 1668.

There is the Museum of Bulgan Province. Its most interesting part is a display on Mongolia's first man in space, J. Gurragchaa, who was born in Bulgan Aimag in 1947.

The mausoleum of Khatanbaatar Magsarjav, a national hero who liberated the Mongolian town of Khovd from the Chinese in 1912, can be seen on a hill in the southwest of Bulgan.

Dashchoinkhorlon Khiid is a monastery rebuilt in 1992. The former monastery, Bangiin Khuree which had been inhabited by about 1000 monks, was destroyed by order of Khorloogiin Choibalsan in 1937.

== Nature Reserve ==
Uran Togoo Tulga Nature Reserve (1600 hectare), about 60 km west of Bulgan, is famous for its extinct volcanoes, e.g. Uran Uul.

== Climate ==
Bulgan experiences a subarctic climate (Köppen climate classification Dwc) with mild summers and severely cold winters. Precipitation is very low, but significantly higher in summer than at other times of the year. Winters are very dry, although some snowfall occurs around April and October.

Climate data for Bulgan, elevation 1,219 m (3,999 ft), (1991–2020, extremes 1941–present)
Month	Jan	Feb	Mar	Apr	May	Jun	Jul	Aug	Sep	Oct	Nov	Dec	Year
Record high °C (°F)	6.0 (42.8)	12.0 (53.6)	21.0 (69.8)	31.4 (88.5)	36.0 (96.8)	36.2 (97.2)	38.3 (100.9)	35.3 (95.5)	30.5 (86.9)	24.4 (75.9)	16.2 (61.2)	10.9 (51.6)	38.3 (100.9)
Mean daily maximum °C (°F)	−13.2 (8.2)	−7.9 (17.8)	1.7 (35.1)	11.5 (52.7)	18.5 (65.3)	23.3 (73.9)	24.5 (76.1)	22.5 (72.5)	17.1 (62.8)	8.7 (47.7)	−3.2 (26.2)	−11.3 (11.7)	7.7 (45.8)
Daily mean °C (°F)	−20.8 (−5.4)	−16.9 (1.6)	−7.3 (18.9)	3.0 (37.4)	9.8 (49.6)	15.5 (59.9)	17.7 (63.9)	15.2 (59.4)	8.5 (47.3)	−0.1 (31.8)	−10.7 (12.7)	−18.3 (−0.9)	−0.4 (31.4)
Mean daily minimum °C (°F)	−26.4 (−15.5)	−23.8 (−10.8)	−14.9 (5.2)	−4.9 (23.2)	1.1 (34.0)	7.8 (46.0)	11.2 (52.2)	8.7 (47.7)	1.2 (34.2)	−6.8 (19.8)	−16.7 (1.9)	−23.7 (−10.7)	−7.3 (18.9)
Record low °C (°F)	−41.6 (−42.9)	−40.2 (−40.4)	−35.2 (−31.4)	−22.2 (−8.0)	−12.8 (9.0)	−8.9 (16.0)	0.0 (32.0)	−3.0 (26.6)	−14.6 (5.7)	−28.2 (−18.8)	−38.5 (−37.3)	−39.3 (−38.7)	−41.6 (−42.9)
Average precipitation mm (inches)	2 (0.1)	2 (0.1)	5 (0.2)	13 (0.5)	21 (0.8)	57 (2.2)	97 (3.8)	66 (2.6)	28 (1.1)	8 (0.3)	5 (0.2)	2 (0.1)	306 (12)
Average precipitation days (≥ 1.0 mm)	1.1	1.5	2.0	2.7	4.1	8.2	11.4	9.4	4.5	2.5	1.9	1.5	50.7
Average relative humidity (%)	75.4	72.5	66.2	55.6	54.4	63.0	71.6	73.9	68.7	68.5	73.5	76.1	68.3
Source 1: Pogoda.ru.net
Source 2: NOAA

== Transportation ==
The Bulgan Airport (UGA/ZMBN) has one unpaved runway and is served by regular flights to Ulaanbaatar, Khovd, and Mörön.

Bulgan is linked to Erdenet and to Ulaanbaatar by a paved road.
