= Bulgan Airport =

Airport in Bulgan, Mongolia

Bulgan Airport Булган нисэх буудал ᠪᠤᠯᠠᠭᠠᠨ ᠨᠢᠰᠬᠦ ᠪᠠᠭᠤᠳᠠᠯ
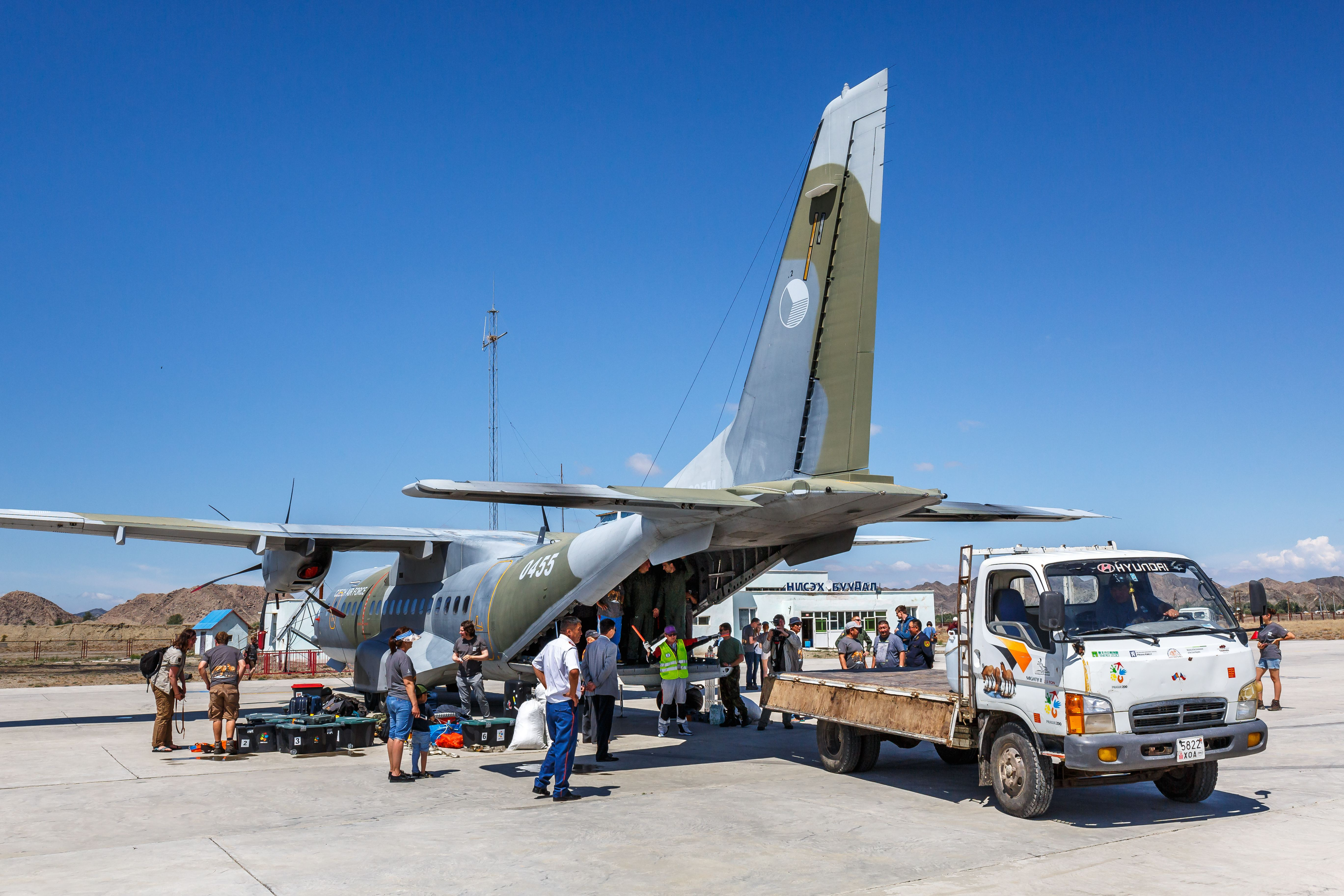
- IATA: UGA; ICAO: ZMBN

Summary
- Airport type: Military/public
- Operator: Civil Aviation Authority of Mongolia
- Location: Bulgan, Mongolia
- Elevation AMSL: 1,291 m / 4,236 ft
- Coordinates: 48°51′15″N 103°29′03″E

Map
- Location of airport in Mongolia

Runways
Direction	Length		Surface
Direction	m	ft	Surface
13/31	1,900	6,234	Grass

Bulgan Airport
- Simplified Chinese: 布尔干 (机场)
Transcriptions

Bulgan Airport (IATA: UGA, ICAO: ZMBN) is a public airport located in Bulgan, the capital of Bulgan Province in Mongolia. It has one grass runway, 13/31.

== See also ==
- List of airports in Mongolia
