= Dzhida (river) =

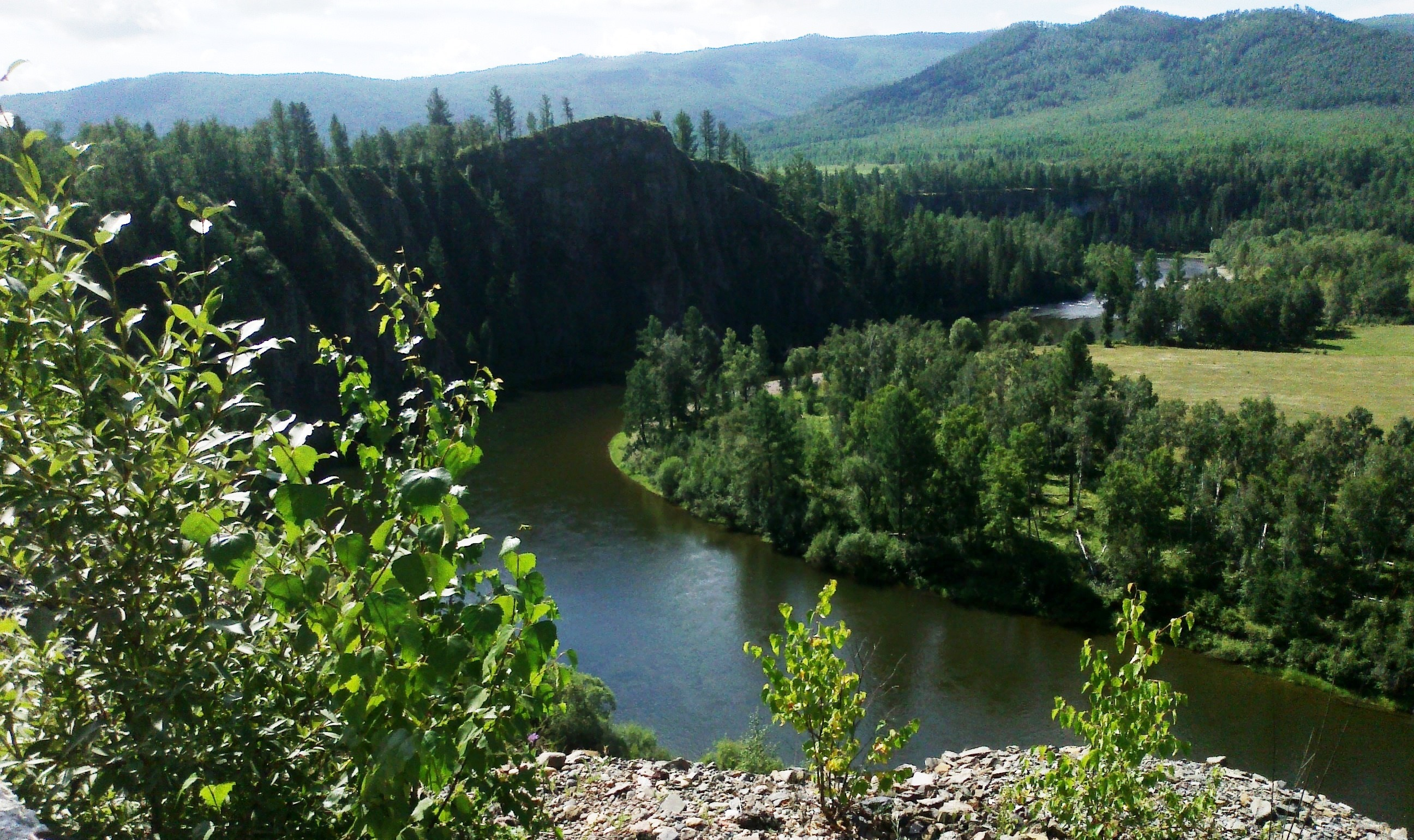
- The Dzhida in the Zakamensky District of Buryatia

Location
- Country: Russia

Physical characteristics
- Source: Khangarul Range
  - coordinates: 51°6′17″N 102°12′46″E
  - elevation: ca 2,200 m (7,200 ft)
- Mouth: Selenga
  - location: Near Dzhida
  - coordinates: 50°44′14″N 106°16′29″E
  - elevation: 558 m (1,831 ft)
- Length: 840 km (520 mi)
- Basin size: 38,500 km^{2} (14,900 sq mi)
- Discharge
  - average: 74 m^{3}/s (2,600 cu ft/s)

Basin features
- Progression: Selenga→ Lake Baikal→ Angara→ Yenisey→ Kara Sea

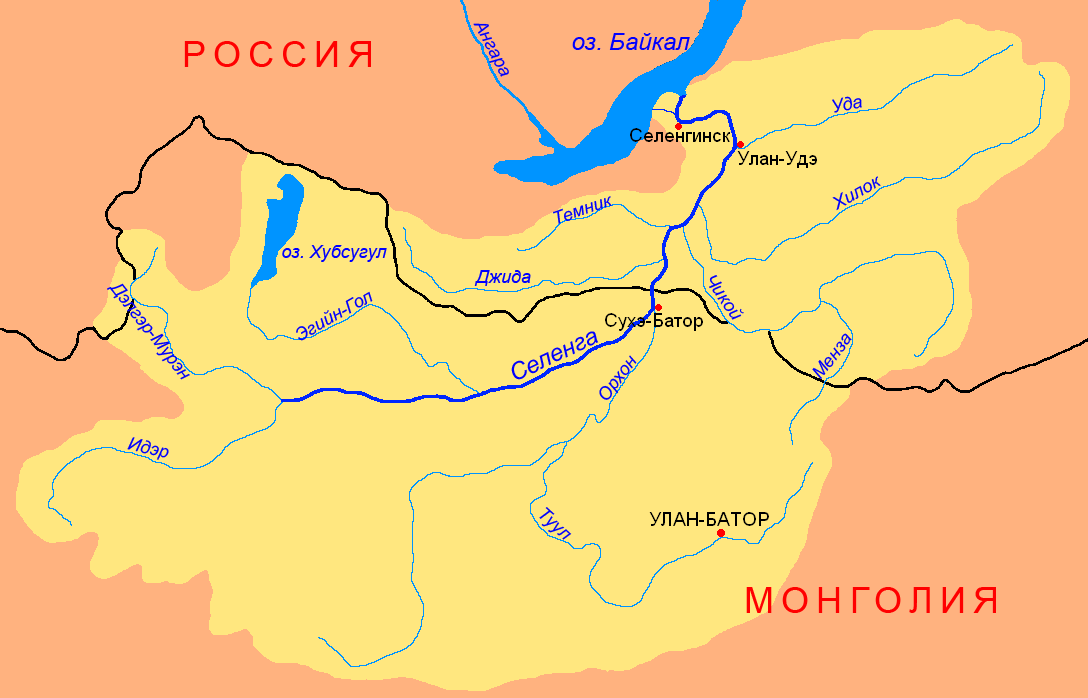
Selenga watershed

The Dzhida (Russian: Джида) is a river in the south of Buryatia, Russia, a left tributary of the Selenga. It is 567 kilometres (352 mi) long, and has a drainage basin of 23,500 square kilometres (9,100 sq mi).

== Geography ==
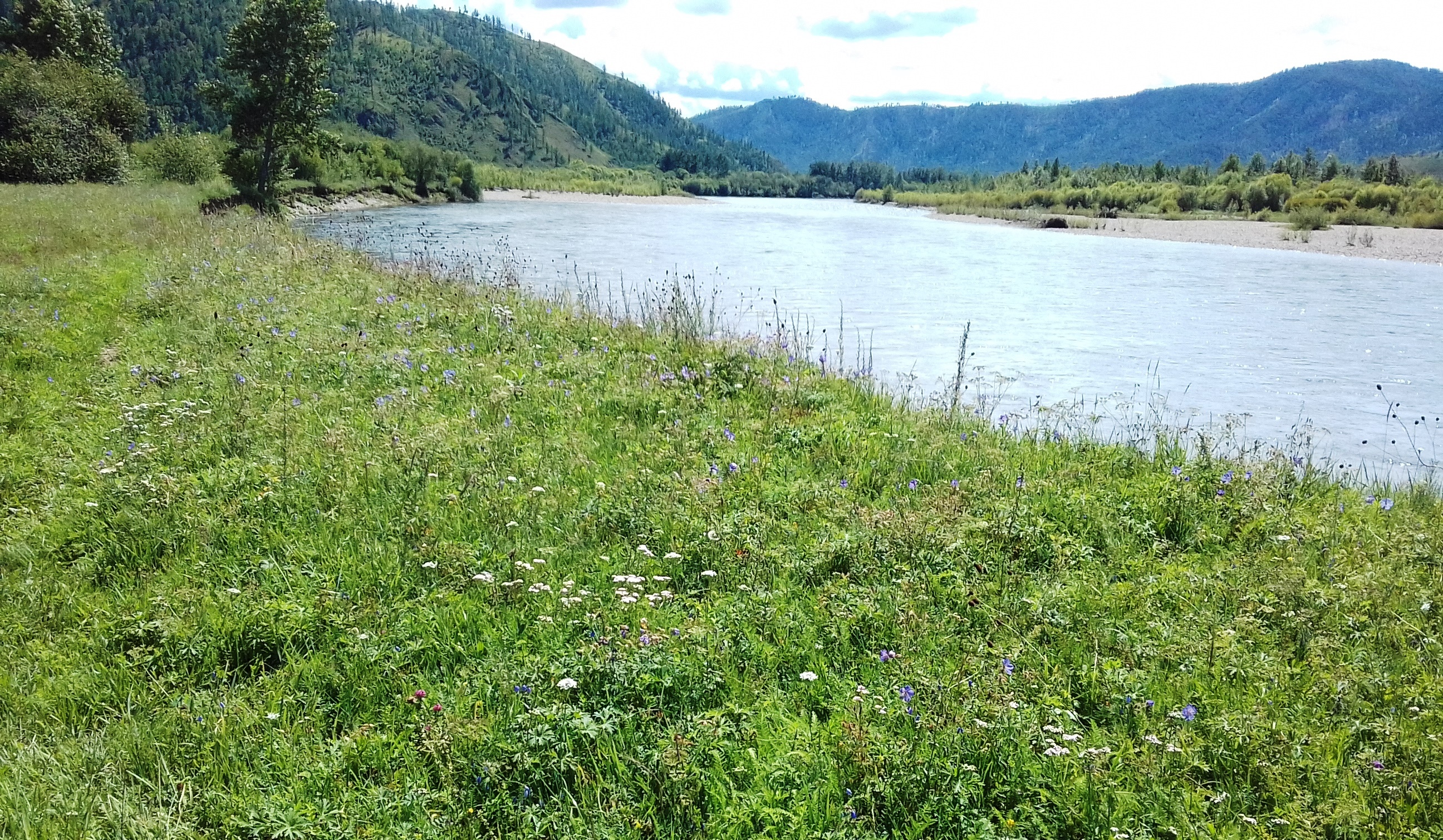
The Dzhida in the area of Toreyskiye Meadows in the Dzhidinsky District of Buryatia, Russia

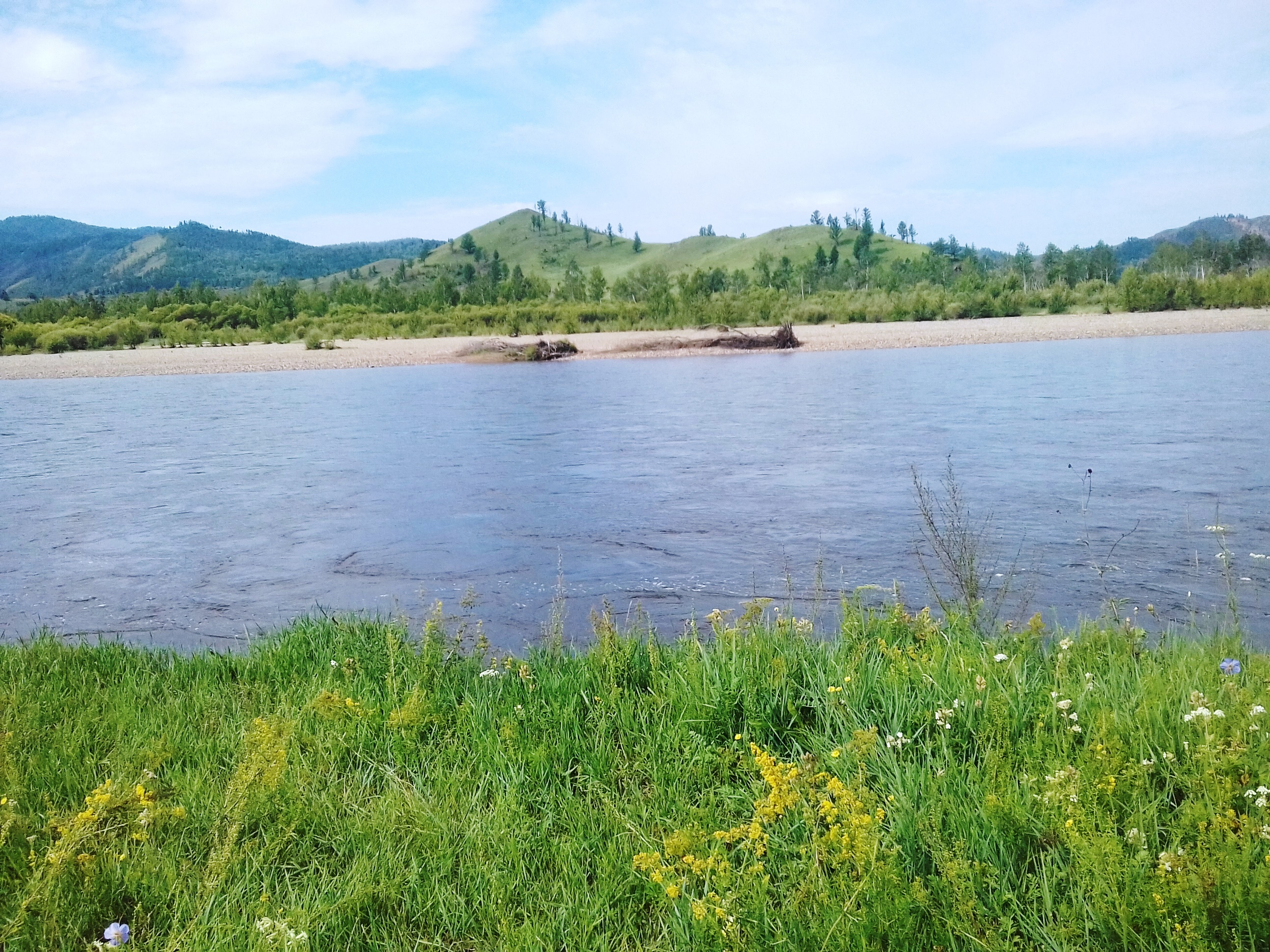
The bank of the river Dzhida. Dzhidinsky District of Buryatia, Russia

One of the largest rivers of Buryatia originates in the extreme west of the Khangarul ridge, 3 km east of the Russian-Mongolian border. The first third of the current Dzhida runs in a narrow gorge from northwest to southeast along the mountain taiga in the west of the Zakamensky district. Near the city of Zakamensk, the river turns to the east and flows parallel to the Dzhidinskiy ridge (from the south) and the Maly Khamar-Daban ridge (from the north). Below Zakamensk, the gorges of the river valley alternate with extended areas.

Within the Dzhida region, the river takes a more calm character, the valley expands. In the lower reaches the river flows along the southern edge of the Borgoy steppe. 8 km below the village of Dzhida the river flows into Selengu opposite the саenbėn ulus. In the lower reaches, above the station of Dzhida, the riverbed crosses the southern line of the East Siberian Railway Ulan-Ude-Naushki. For 150 km along the left, northern, bank of the river between the villages Oyor and Dutulur passes the regional road P440 Gusinoozersk - Zakamensk (Dzhidinskiy trakt).

Settlements on the banks of the Dzhida and its valley (from the source to the mouth): Engorgoy, Nurt, Zakamensk, Khuzhir, Dutulur, Tsakir, Khamnei, Usanovka, Ust-Burgaltay, Mikhailovka, Ulekchin, Kharatsai, Naryn, Khuldat, Shartykey, Oyor, Old Ukyrchelon, Tohoy, Zheltura, Tangrek, Mill, Bayan, Bulyk, Petropavlovka, Tasarhai, Botsiy, Upper Yonhor, Nyugui, Yonhor, Dyrestuy, Dzhida.

== Hydrology ==
Feeding rainwater. The water flow in the mouth is 60 m^{3} / s.

The average annual water discharge in the area of the village of Djida (21 km from the mouth) is 73.54 m^{3} / s. Average monthly water charges (observations from 1939 to 1997)

== The data of the water register ==
According to the State Water Register of Russia and the geoinformation system for water management of the territory of the Russian Federation, prepared by the Federal Agency for Water Resources [3]:

Basin District - Angara-Baikal The river basin is Selenga (the Russian part of the basins) The river sub-basin is absent Water management site - Jida Code of water body - 16030000112116300006973

== Main tributaries ==
(distance from the mouth)

158 km - the river Zheltura (right) 328 km - the river Hamnya (left) 438 km - the river Tsakirka (left)

== See also ==
- Selenga Highlands
- List of rivers of Russia
