= Zheltura =

Zheltura Желтура
- Selo
- Location within Republic of Buryatia Location within Russia
- Coordinates: 50°28′N 105°06′E
- Country: Russia
- Region: Republic of Buryatia
- District: Dzhidinsky District
- Time zone: UTC+8:00

Zheltura (Russian: Желтура; Buryat: Зэлтэр, Zelter) is a rural locality (a selo) in Dzhidinsky District, Republic of Buryatia, Russia. The population was 427 as of 2010. There are 4 streets.

== Geography ==
Zheltura is located 31 km southwest of Petropavlovka (the district's administrative centre) by road. Tengerek is the nearest rural locality.
