= Bulgan, Bayan-Ölgii =

District in Bayan-Ölgii Province, Mongolia

Coordinates: 46°55′26″N 91°05′24″E

Bulgan District Булган сум ᠪᠤᠯᠠᠭᠠᠨᠰᠤᠮᠤ
- District
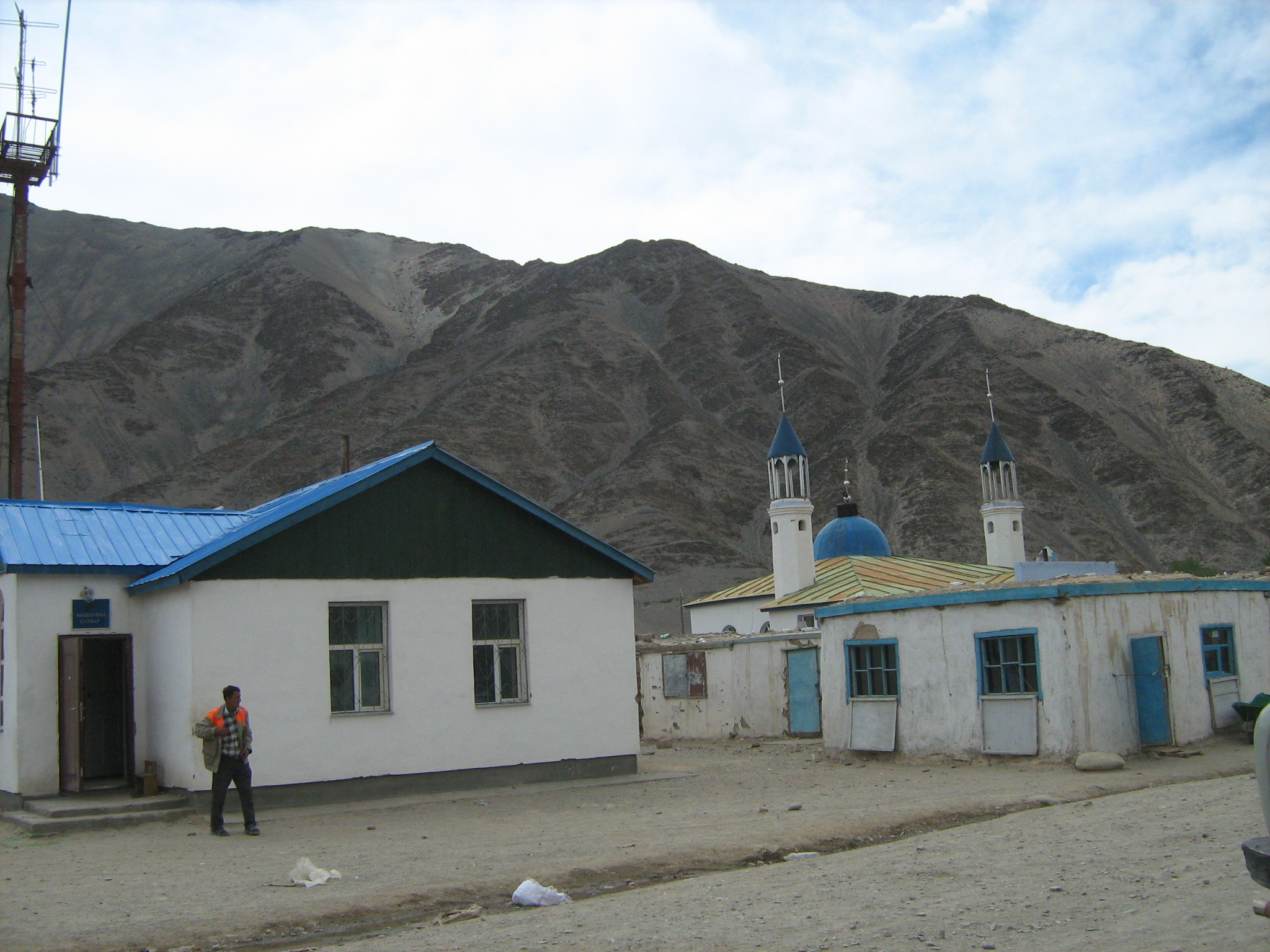
- Muslim mosque, June 2008
- Interactive map of Bulgan District
- Country: Mongolia
- Province: Bayan-Ölgii Province

Area
  - Total: 4,977.33 km^{2} (1,921.76 sq mi)

Population (2014)
  - Total: 5,216
- Time zone: UTC+7 (UTC + 7)

Bulgan (Mongolian: Булган [pʊ́ɮɢəɴ]) is a district of Bayan-Ölgii Province in western Mongolia. As of the 2014 census, it had a population of 5,216.

== Geography ==
The sum is the eastern and southern most sum in Bayan-Ölgii Province.

== Administrative divisions ==
The district is divided into seven bags, which are:

- Bulgan
- Jargalant
- Khujirt
- Saikhan Bag
- Sunkhul
- Ulaagchin Bag
- Ulaankhus

== Notable natives ==
- Tsagaan Puntsag, entrepreneur, international lawyer, economist, philanthropist and politician
