= Orkhon, Bulgan =

District in Bulgan Province, Mongolia

Coordinates: 48°37′53″N 103°32′13″E

Orkhon District Орхон сум ᠣᠷᠬᠤᠨᠰᠤᠮᠤ
- District
- Interactive map of Orkhon District
- Country: Mongolia
- Province: Bulgan Province

Area
  - Total: 4,100 km^{2} (1,600 sq mi)

Population
  - Total: 4,000
- Time zone: UTC+8 (UTC + 8)

Orkhon (Mongolian: Орхон) is a sum (district) of Bulgan Province in northern Mongolia. The former Soviet Army military base area (10 km long from west to east, 2.5 km from north to south) is 6 km southwest of the sum center. In 2009, its population was 3,012.

== Geography ==
The district has a total area of 4,100 km^{2}.

== Administrative divisions ==
The district is divided into five bags, which are:

- Arbulag
- Bukht
- Khaliun
- Maanit
- Sumiin Tuv
