= Khishig-Öndör =

District in Bulgan Province, Mongolia

Coordinates: 48°17′43″N 103°25′57″E

Khishig-Öndör District Хишиг-Өндөр сум ᠬᠢᠰᠢᠭᠥᠨᠳᠦᠷᠰᠤᠮᠤ
- District
- Interactive map of Khishig-Öndör District
- Country: Mongolia
- Province: Bulgan Province

Area
  - Total: 2,455 km^{2} (948 sq mi)
- Time zone: UTC+8 (UTC + 8)

Khishig-Öndör (Mongolian: Хишиг-Өндөр) is a sum (district) of Bulgan Province in northern Mongolia. It is located approximately 160 miles west of Ulaanbataar. In 2009, its population was 3,171.

== Geography ==
The district has a total area of 2,455 km^{2}.

== Administrative divisions ==
The district is divided into five bags, which are:

- Banzar
- Jargalant
- Khuremt
- Maanit
- Teeg
