= Bugat, Bulgan =

District in Bulgan Province, Mongolia

Coordinates: 49°03′52″N 103°40′20″E

Bugat District Бугат сум ᠪᠤᠭᠠᠲᠤᠰᠤᠮᠤ
- District
- Interactive map of Bugat District
- Country: Mongolia
- Province: Bulgan Province

Area
  - Total: 3,004 km^{2} (1,160 sq mi)
- Time zone: UTC+8 (UTC + 8)

Bugat (Mongolian: Бугат) is a sum (district) of Bulgan Province in northern Mongolia. In 2009, its population is 1,890.

== Geography ==
The district has a total area of 3,004 km^{2}.

== Administrative divisions ==
The district is divided into three bags, which are:

- Bayantugul
- Khanjargalant
- Nairamdal
