= Khutag-Öndör =

District in Bulgan Province, Mongolia

Khutag-Öndör District Хутаг-Өндөр сум ᠬᠤᠲᠤᠭᠥᠨᠳᠦᠷᠰᠤᠮᠤ
- District
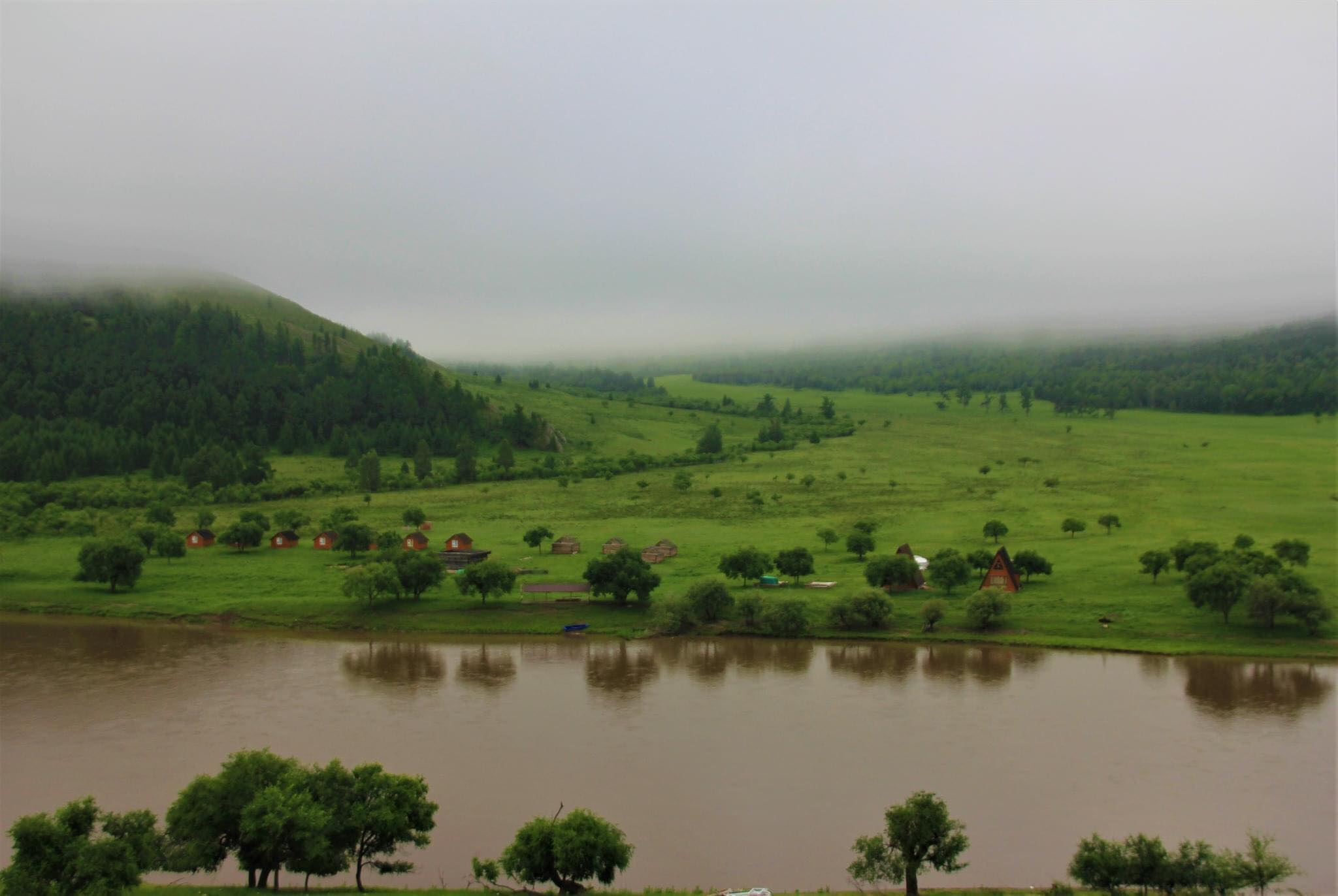

- Location within Mongolia
- Coordinates: 49°23′33″N 102°42′9″E
- Country: Mongolia
- Province: Bulgan Province

Area
  - Total: 5,100 km^{2} (2,000 sq mi)
- Time zone: UTC+8 (UTC + 8)

Khutag-Öndör (Mongolian: Хутаг-Өндөр) is a sum (district) of Bulgan Province in northern Mongolia. In 2009 its population was 4,591.

== Geography ==
The district has a total area of 5,100 km^{2}.

== Climate ==
Khutag-Öndör has a humid continental climate (Köppen climate classification Dwb) with warm summers and severely cold winters. Most precipitation falls in the summer as rain, with some snow in the adjacent months of May and September. Winters are very dry.

Climate data for Khutag-Öndör, elevation 938 m (3,077 ft), (1991–2020 normals, extremes 1973–1990, 1999–2023)
Month	Jan	Feb	Mar	Apr	May	Jun	Jul	Aug	Sep	Oct	Nov	Dec	Year
Record high °C (°F)	7.4 (45.3)	14.5 (58.1)	22.5 (72.5)	32.6 (90.7)	35.2 (95.4)	37.5 (99.5)	40.5 (104.9)	38.0 (100.4)	31.2 (88.2)	26.4 (79.5)	17.0 (62.6)	13.3 (55.9)	40.5 (104.9)
Mean daily maximum °C (°F)	−17.0 (1.4)	−8.9 (16.0)	3.4 (38.1)	13.9 (57.0)	20.9 (69.6)	25.9 (78.6)	26.9 (80.4)	24.5 (76.1)	19.1 (66.4)	10.1 (50.2)	−3.9 (25.0)	−13.9 (7.0)	8.4 (47.2)
Daily mean °C (°F)	−24.5 (−12.1)	−17.8 (0.0)	−5.4 (22.3)	5.1 (41.2)	12.0 (53.6)	17.7 (63.9)	19.6 (67.3)	16.9 (62.4)	10.2 (50.4)	1.1 (34.0)	−11.0 (12.2)	−20.6 (−5.1)	0.3 (32.5)
Mean daily minimum °C (°F)	−30.4 (−22.7)	−25.5 (−13.9)	−13.1 (8.4)	−2.7 (27.1)	3.6 (38.5)	10.2 (50.4)	12.5 (54.5)	10.5 (50.9)	2.9 (37.2)	−5.3 (22.5)	−16.7 (1.9)	−26.0 (−14.8)	−6.7 (20.0)
Record low °C (°F)	−47.6 (−53.7)	−44.3 (−47.7)	−35.5 (−31.9)	−22.1 (−7.8)	−11.5 (11.3)	−3.8 (25.2)	0.4 (32.7)	−2.1 (28.2)	−12.0 (10.4)	−22.5 (−8.5)	−36.6 (−33.9)	−43.9 (−47.0)	−47.6 (−53.7)
Average precipitation mm (inches)	1.4 (0.06)	1.7 (0.07)	5.2 (0.20)	9.8 (0.39)	23.2 (0.91)	49.4 (1.94)	97.2 (3.83)	89.8 (3.54)	24.3 (0.96)	9.8 (0.39)	4.6 (0.18)	3.1 (0.12)	319.5 (12.59)
Average precipitation days (≥ 1.0 mm)	0.5	0.6	1.4	2.7	4.0	7.2	11.4	8.7	4.1	2.6	1.4	1.3	45.9
Mean monthly sunshine hours	183.2	203.7	255.3	249.9	291.2	283.7	263.0	261.7	245.8	222.0	173.2	157.4	2,790.1
Source 1: NOAA (sun 1973-1990)
Source 2: Starlings Roost Weather

== Administrative divisions ==
The district is divided into five bags, which are:

- Khantai
- Khongor
- Khutag
- Teel
- Unit
