= Selenge, Bulgan =

District in Bulgan Province, Mongolia

Coordinates: 49°27′29″N 103°58′32″E

Selenge District Сэлэнгэ сум ᠰᠡᠯᠡᠩᠭᠡᠰᠤᠮᠤ
- District
- Interactive map of Selenge District
- Country: Mongolia
- Province: Bulgan Province

Area
  - Total: 4,900 km^{2} (1,900 sq mi)
- Time zone: UTC+8 (UTC + 8)

Selenge (Mongolian: Сэлэнгэ) is a sum (district) of Bulgan Province in northern Mongolia. In 2009, its population was 3,271.

== Geography ==
The district has a total area of 4,900 km^{2}.

== Administrative divisions ==
The district is divided into five bags, which are:

- Tarimal
- Tariakhai
- Selengeburen
- Sangaltai
- Inget
