= Bulgan Province =

Province of Mongolia

Bulgan Province Булган аймаг ᠪᠤᠯᠠᠭᠠᠨᠠᠶᠢᠮᠠᠭ
- Province
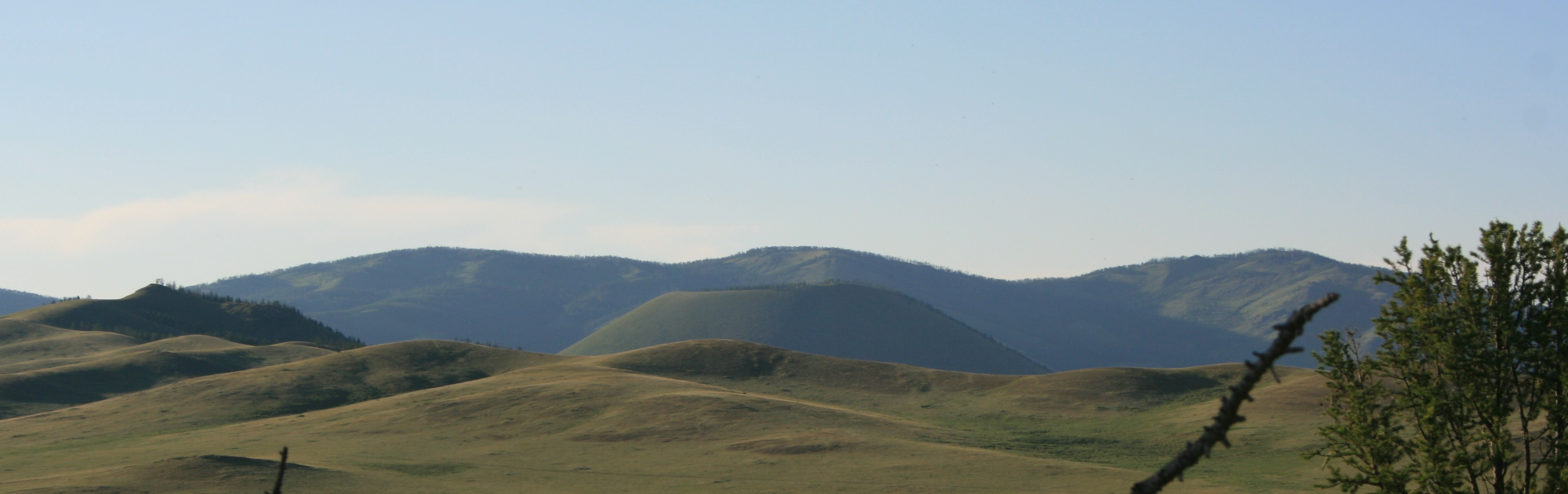
- Uran Togoo volcano caldera

- Flag Coat of arms

- Location of Bulgan in Mongolia
- Coordinates: 48°48′N 103°33′E
- Country: Mongolia
- Established: 1938
- Capital: Bulgan
- Divisions: 16 sums

Government
  - Body: Citizens' Representatives Khural of Bulgan Province

Area
  - Total: 48,733 km^{2} (18,816 sq mi)

Population (2024)
  - Total: 60,130
  - Density: 1.234/km^{2} (3.196/sq mi)

GDP
  - Total: MNT 550 billion US$ 0.2 billion (2022)
  - Per capita: MNT 8,892,720; US$ 2,847 (2022)
- Time zone: UTC+8
- Area code: +976 (0)134
- ISO 3166 code: MN-067
- Vehicle registration: БУ_
- Website: bulgan.gov.mn

Bulgan Province (Mongolian: Булган аймаг) is one of the 21 provinces of Mongolia, located in the north of the country, bordering Russia. Its capital is also named Bulgan.

== History ==
Bulgan Province was officially established on 15 January 1938 following 1937 decision by the Council of Ministers of the Mongolian People's Republic, being separated from Selenge Province.

In 1994, Orkhon Province was taken out from Bulgan Province area to form an independent province.

== Geography ==
The province (or aimag) is surrounded by Russia (Buryatia) to the north, the Khövsgöl Province to the northwest, Arkhangai to the southwest, Övörkhangai to the south, Töv to the southeast, and Selenge to the northeast. The small Orkhon Province forms an enclave at the border with Selenge.

The north of the aimag is characterized by alpine forests, gradually blending into the arid steppe plains of the central Mongolian highland. The main rivers are the Orkhon and the Selenge, the first of which enters the aimag from Övörkhangai, while the second enters from Khövsgöl Province. As a result, southern and central Bulgan is one of Mongolia's few arable regions.

== Administrative subdivisions ==
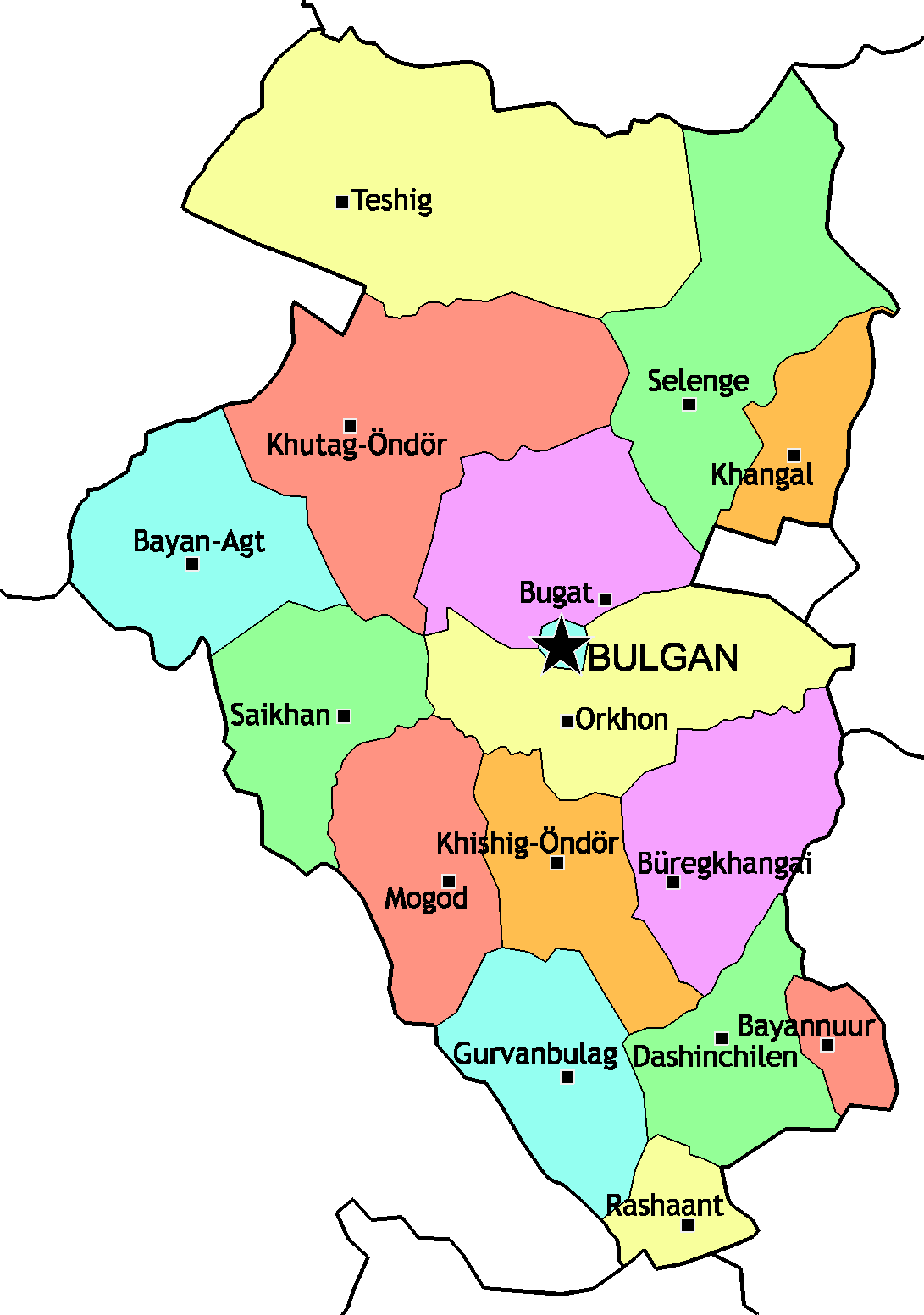
Sums of Bulgan

The province is divided into 16 sums (districts) and 75 bags (subdistricts).

Sums of Bulgan Aimag
| Sum | Mongolian | Population (2005) | Population (2008) | Population (2009) | Population (2022) |
|---|---|---|---|---|---|
| Bayan-Agt | Баян-Агт | 2,823 | 3,014 | 3,048 | 3,375 |
| Bayannuur | Баяннуур | 1,303 | 1,418 | 1,526 | 1,878 |
| Bugat | Бугат | 1,799 | 1,873 | 1,890 | 2,144 |
| Bulgan* | Булган | 11,984 | 12,323 | 12,396 | 12,817 |
| Büregkhangai | Бүрэгхангай | 2,123 | 2,366 | 2,406 | 2,924 |
| Dashinchilen | Дашинчилэн | 2,422 | 2,332 | 2,574 | 3,267 |
| Gurvanbulag | Гурванбулаг | 3,221 | 3,052 | 3,119 | 3,008 |
| Khangal** | Хангал | 4,442 | 4,574 | 4,700 | 2,666 |
| Khishig-Öndör | Хишиг-Өндөр | 3,057 | 3,196 | 3,171 | 3,364 |
| Khutag-Öndör | Хутаг-Өндөр | 4,236 | 4,561 | 4,591 | 3,204 |
| Mogod | Могод | 2,609 | 2,658 | 2,738 | 3,559 |
| Orkhon | Орхон | 2,941 | 2,932 | 3,012 | 3,355 |
| Rashaant | Рашаант | 3,206 | 3,083 | 3,131 | 3,568 |
| Saikhan*** | Сайхан | 3,685 | 3,748 | 3,747 | 4,528 |
| Selenge | Сэлэнгэ | 3,057 | 3,248 | 3,271 | 3,021 |
| Teshig | Тэшиг | 3,520 | 3,496 | 3,514 | 5,039 |

^{*} - The aimag capital Bulgan city.

^{**} - data includes Khyalganat urban-type settlement (3,300 pop.), 25 km North from the Khangal sum centre

^{***} - data includes Saikhan-Ovoo urban-type settlement (500 pop.), 25 km North-West from the Saikhan sum centre

== Demographics ==
Historical population
| Year | Pop. | ±% |
|---|---|---|
| 1938 | | — |
| 1961 | 34,800 | — |
| 1971 | 38,800 | +11.5% |
| 1980 | 41,600 | +7.2% |
| 1990 | 55,734 | +34.0% |
| 2000 | 61,734 | +10.8% |
| 2010 | 53,113 | −14.0% |
| 2020 | 61,516 | +15.8% |

As of 2024, according to the National Statistical Office, the province has a population of 60,130. Around 74.5% of residents live in rural areas.

In a 2020 nationwide census, the Khalkha make up around 95.1% of the total population, followed by Bayads 1.6%, Buryats 0.9%, Dörvöds 0.7%, Darkhads 0.5%, Khotons 0.5%, Uriankhai 0.2%, Zakhchin 0.1% and Torghuts 0.1%.

== Economy ==
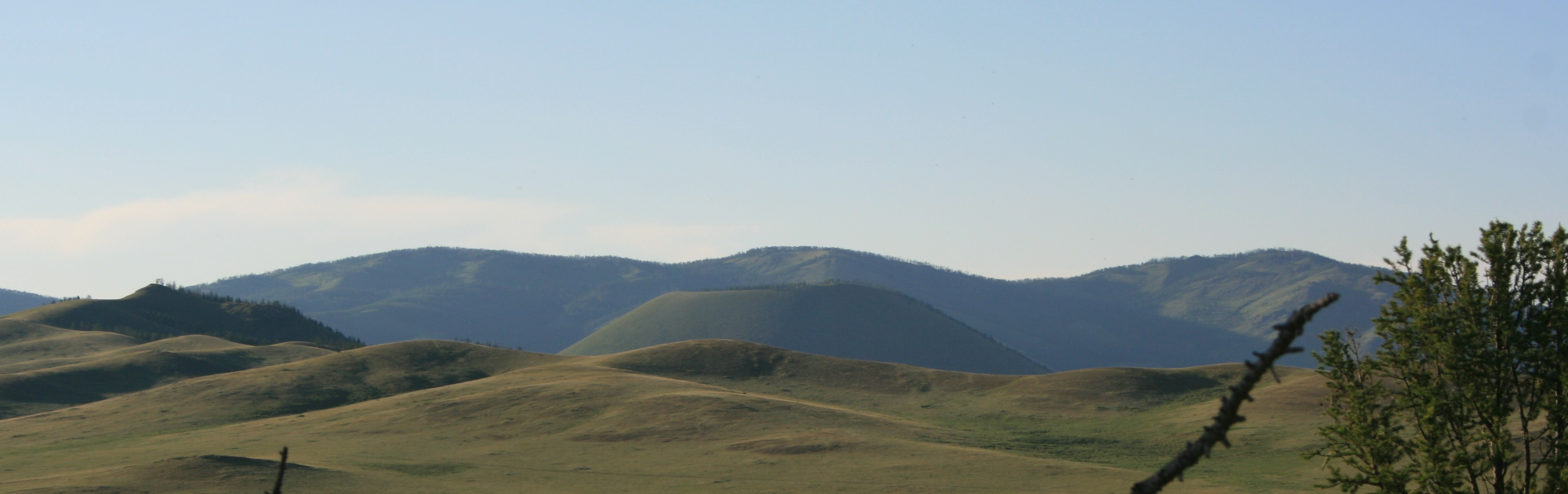
Uran Togoo, an extinct vocano in western Bulgan

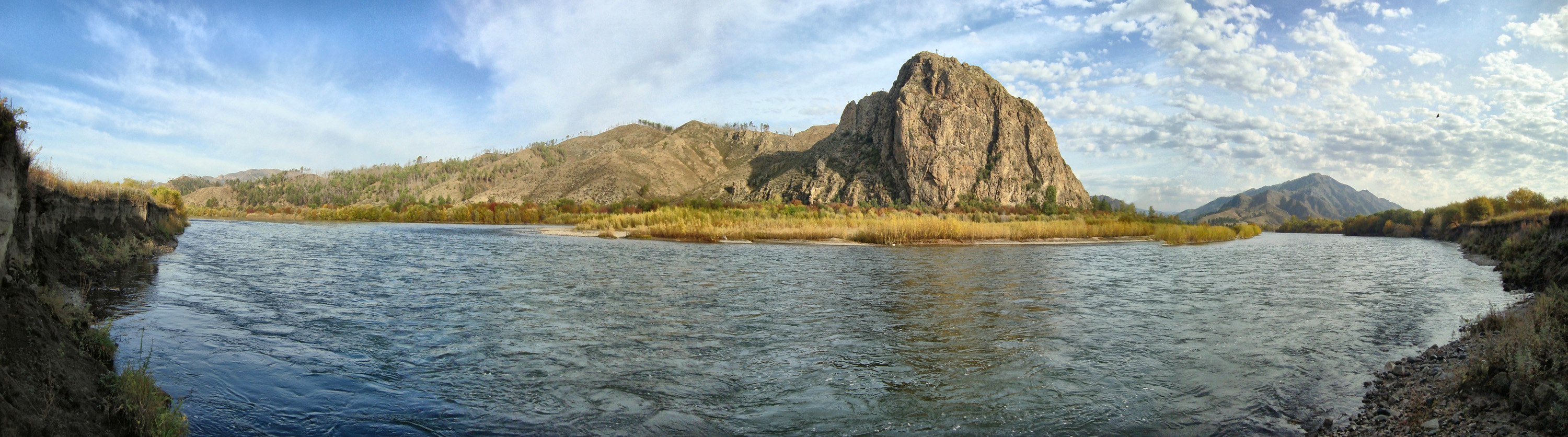
Selenge River flowing through Khutag-Öndör sum of Bulgan

Livestock is one of the main economic activity of the province. In 2018, the province contributed to 0.96% of the total national GDP of Mongolia.

== Transportation ==
The Bulgan Airport (UGA/ZMBN) has one unpaved runway and is served by regular flights to Ulaanbaatar, Khovd, and Mörön.

== Notable people ==
- Khatanbaatar Magsarjav, commander during the 1921 People's Revolution
- Anandyn Amar, prime minister
- Jamiyangiin Lhagvasuren, colonel general of the Mongolian People's Army and Hero of the Mongolian People's Republic
- Jügderdemidiin Gürragchaa, cosmonaut and Minister of Defense
- Naidangiin Tüvshinbayar, judoka and first Mongolian gold champion in the Olympics
- Dashbaldangiin Purevsuren, Opera singer and People's Artist of Mongolia
