= List of rivers of Mongolia =

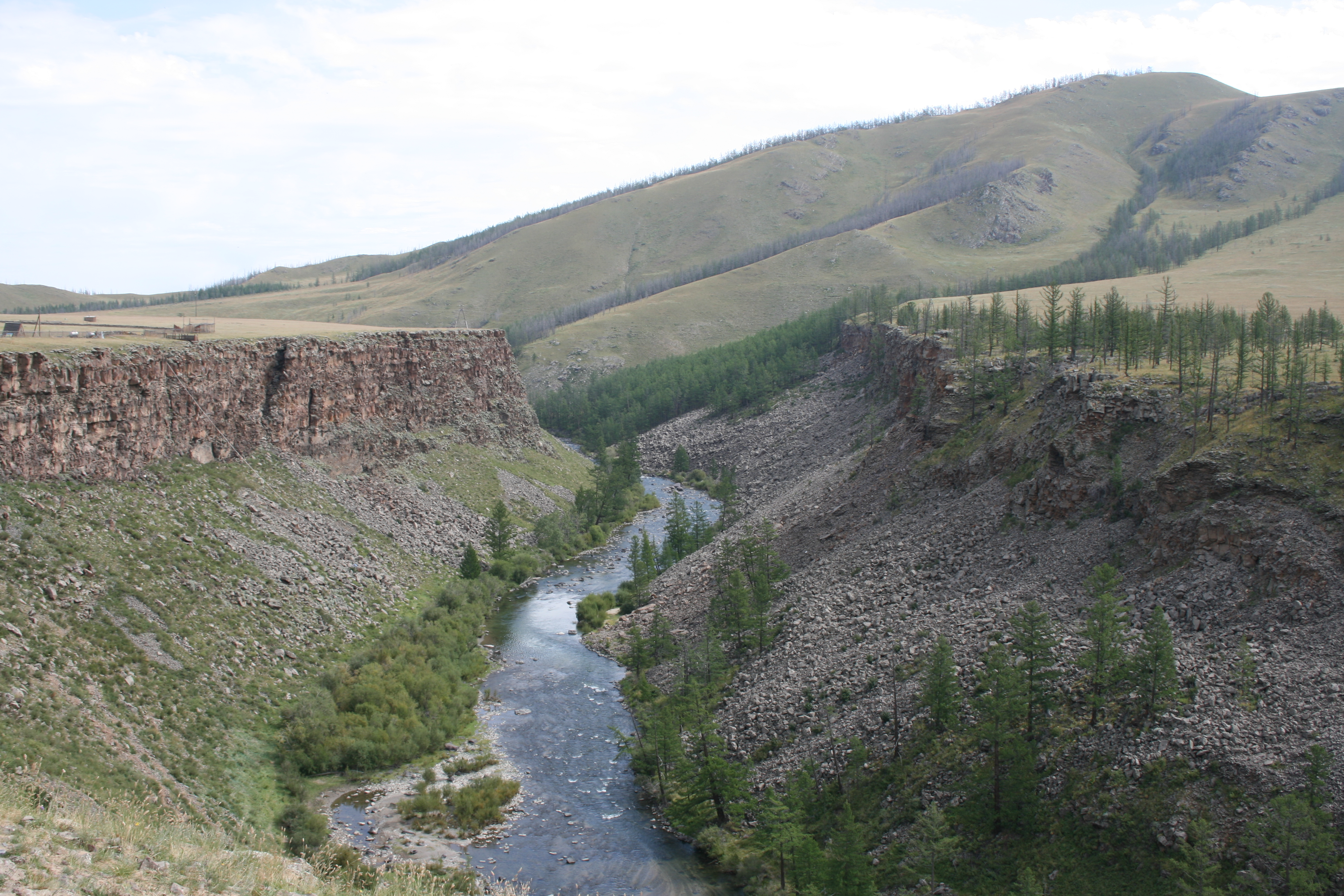
Gorge of the Chuluut River

This is a list of notable rivers of Mongolia, arranged geographically by river basin.

The Mongolian words for river are gol (гол) and mörön (мөрөн), with the latter usually used for larger rivers. The Mongolian names also occasionally have a genitive construction, with the name of the river having the suffix -iin (-ийн) or -yn (-ын). For example, the Ider River's Mongolian name is Ideriin gol (Идэрийн гол), equivalent to saying "the river of Ider".

== Longest rivers ==
Longest rivers of Mongolia
Rank	River	Length	
Rank	River	km	miles
1	Orkhon River	1,124	698
2	Kherlen River	1,090	680
3	Tuul River	704	437
4	Zavkhan River	670	420
5	Selenge River	593	368
6	Hovd River	516	321
7	Eg River	475	295
8	Ider River	452	281
9	Delgermörön	445	277

== Flowing into the Arctic Ocean ==
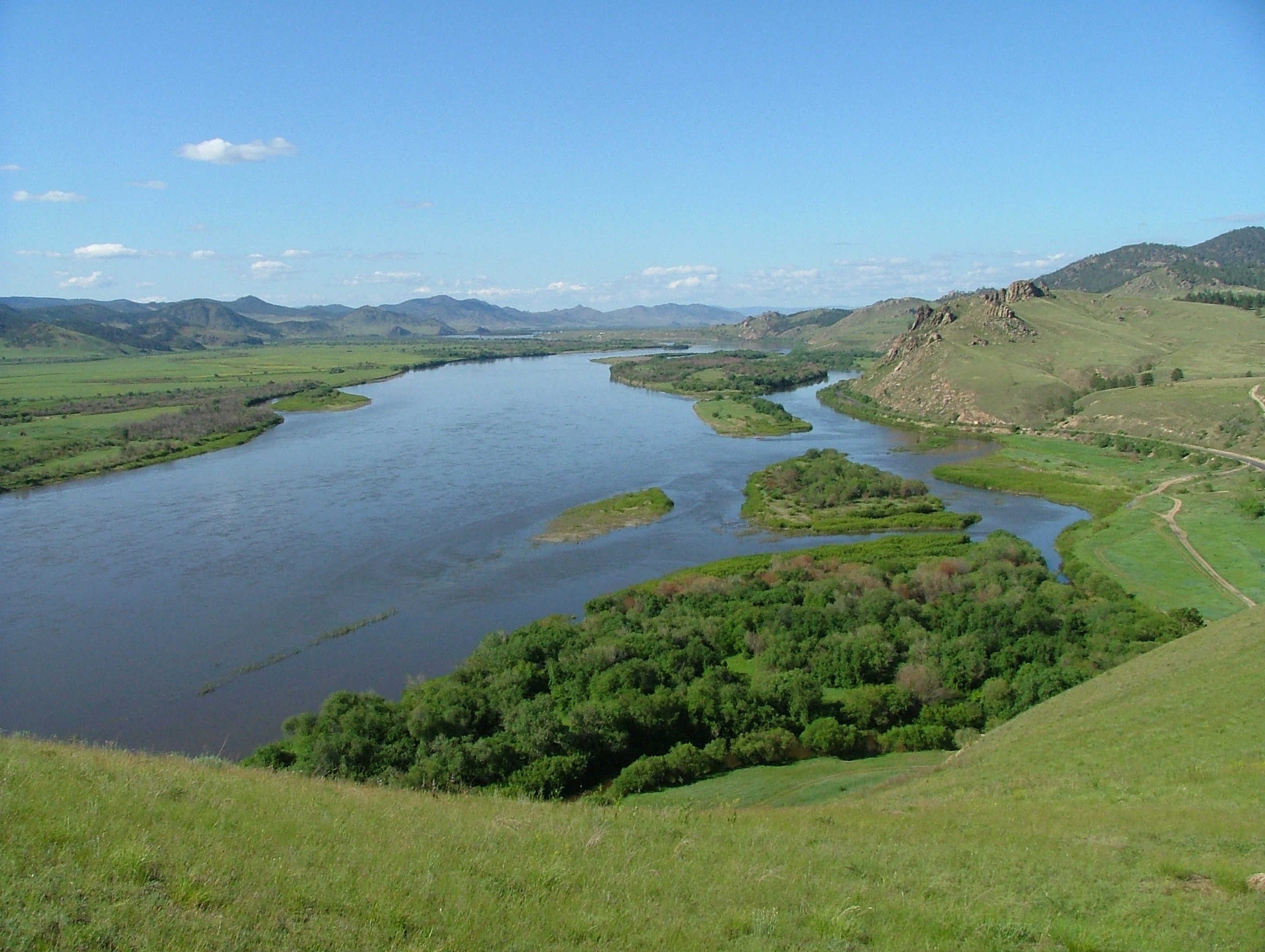
Selenge River

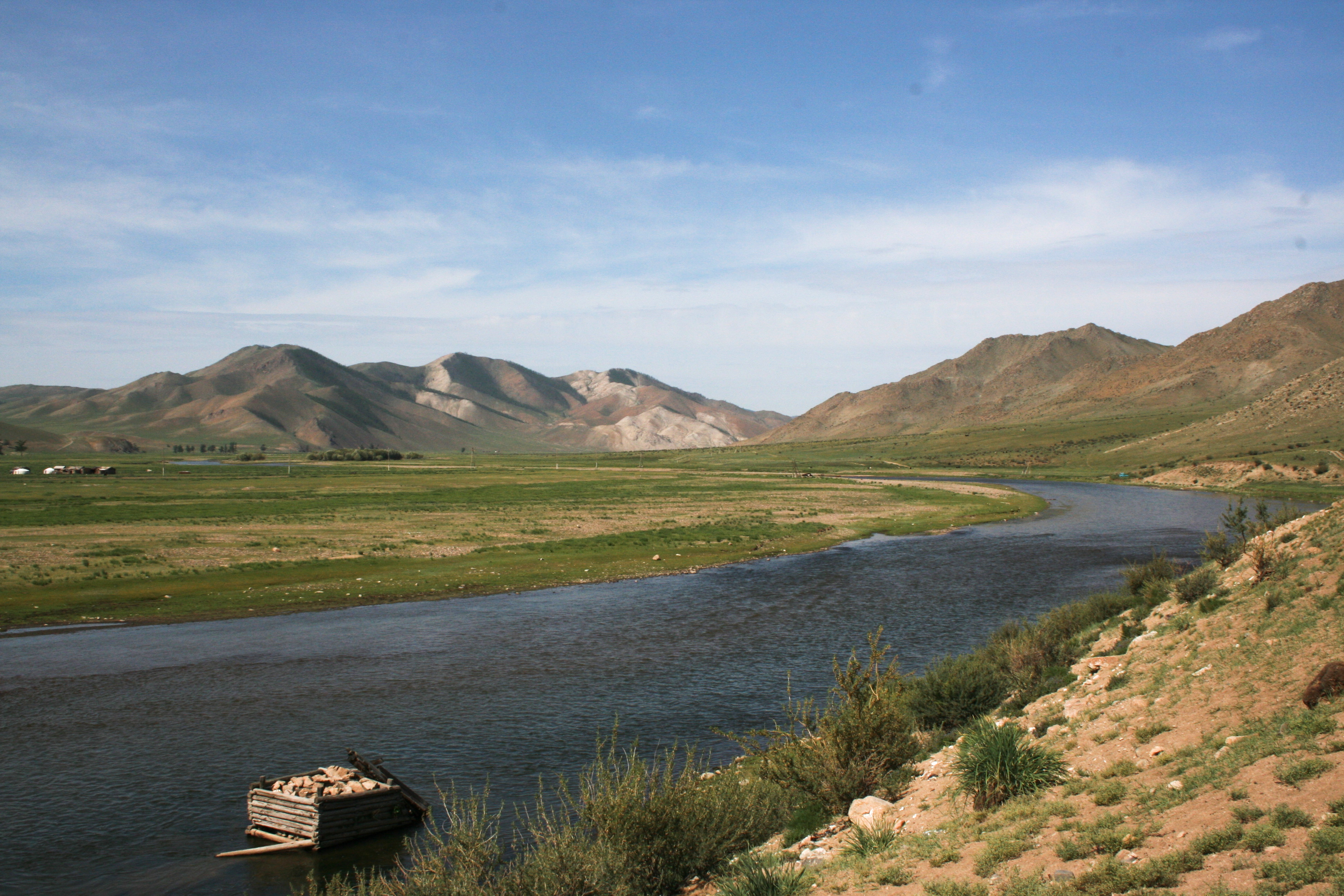
Ider River

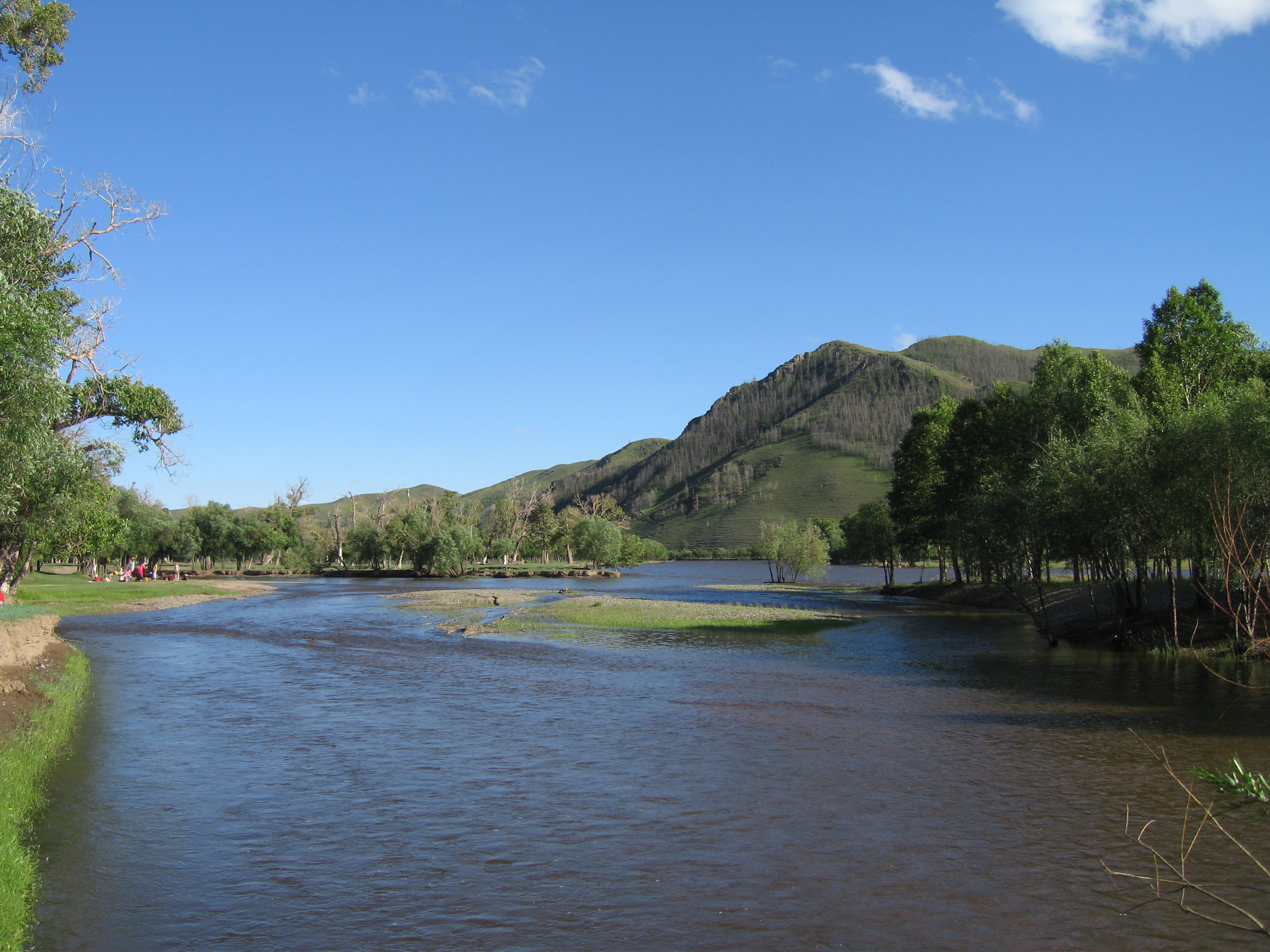
Tuul River

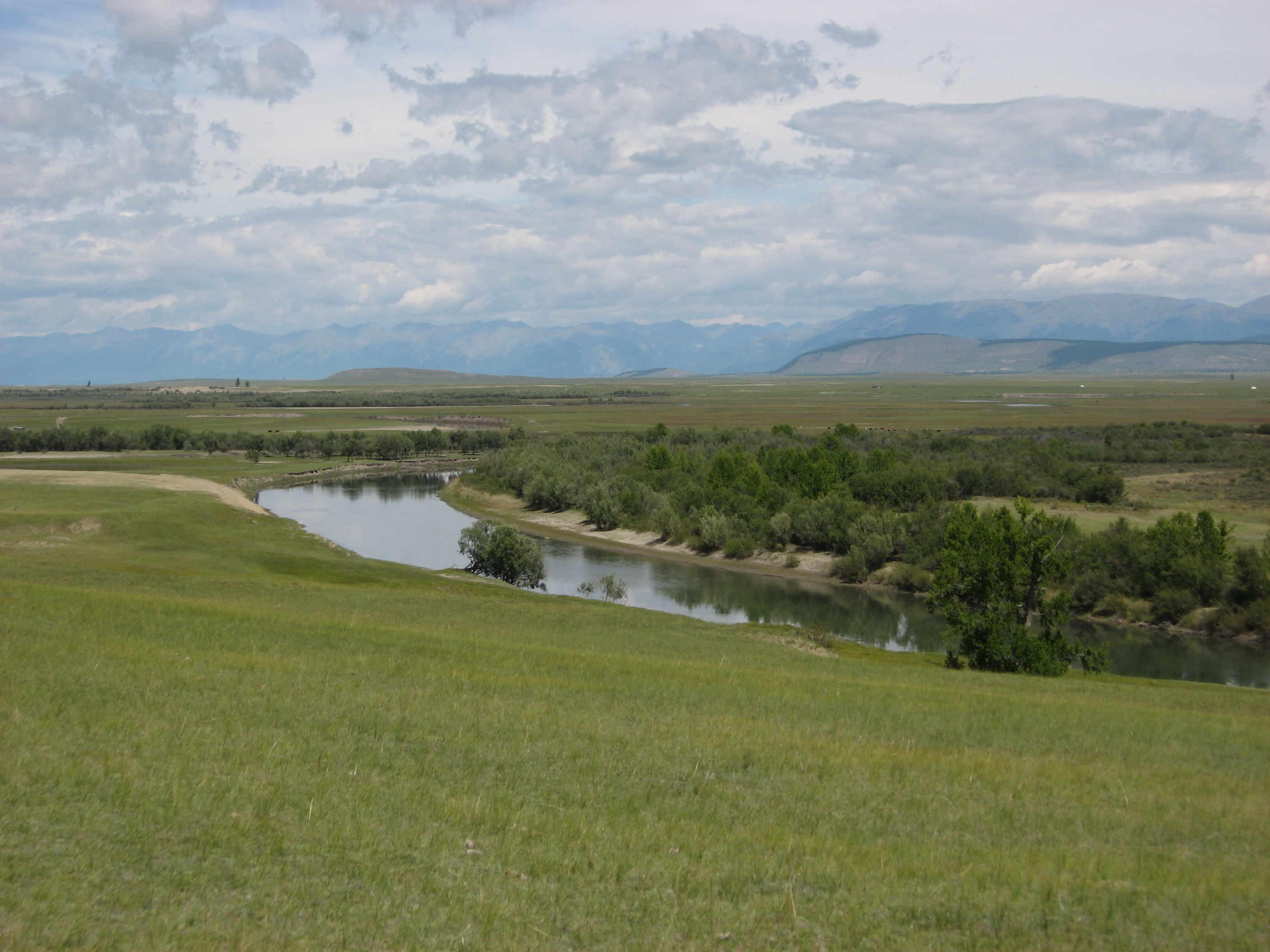
Shishged River

- Yenisei River (Russia)
  - Angara River (Russia), flowing out of Lake Baikal
    - Selenge River (Сэлэнгэ мөрөн in Sükhbaatar) flowing into Lake Baikal
      - Chikoy River
        - Menza River
        - Katantsa River
      - Dzhida River (Russia)
        - Zelter River (Зэлтэрийн гол, Bulgan/Selenge/Russia)
      - Orkhon River (Орхон гол, Arkhangai/Övörkhangai/Bulgan/Selenge)
        - Tuul River (Туул гол, Khentii/Töv/Bulgan/Selenge)
        - Tamir River (Тамир гол, Arkhangai)
        - Kharaa River (Хараа гол, Töv/Selenge/Darkhan-Uul)
      - Eg River (Эгийн гол, Khövsgöl/Bulgan)
        - Üür River (Үүрийн гол, Khövsgöl)
          - Uilgan River (Уйлган гол, Khövsgöl)
          - Arigiin River (Аригийн гол, Khövsgöl)
        - Tarvagatai River (Тарвагтай гол, Bulgan)
      - Khanui River (Хануй гол, Arkhangai/Bulgan)
      - Ider River (Идэр гол, Khövsgöl)
        - Chuluut River (Чулуут гол, Arkhangai/Khövsgöl)
          - Suman River (Суман гол, Arkhangai)
      - Delgermörön (Дэлгэрмөрөн, Khövsgöl)
        - Beltes River (Бэлтэсийн Гол, Khövsgöl)
        - Bügsiin River (Бүгсийн Гол, Khövsgöl)
  - Lesser Yenisei (Russia)
    - Kyzyl-Khem (Кызыл-Хем)
      - Büsein River
      - Shishged River (Шишгэд гол, Khövsgöl)
        - Sharga River (Шарга гол, Khövsgöl)
        - Tengis River (Тэнгис гол, Khövsgöl)

== Flowing into the Sea of Okhotsk (Pacific Ocean) ==
- Amur River (Russia/China)
  - Shilka River (Russia)
    - Onon River (Онон гол)

== Flowing into endorheic basins ==
=== Hulun Lake ===
- Kherlen River (Хэрлэн гол)

=== Ulaan Lake ===
- Ongi River

=== Great Lakes Depression ===
==== Khar-Us Lake ====
- Khovd River

==== Uvs Nuur Basin ====
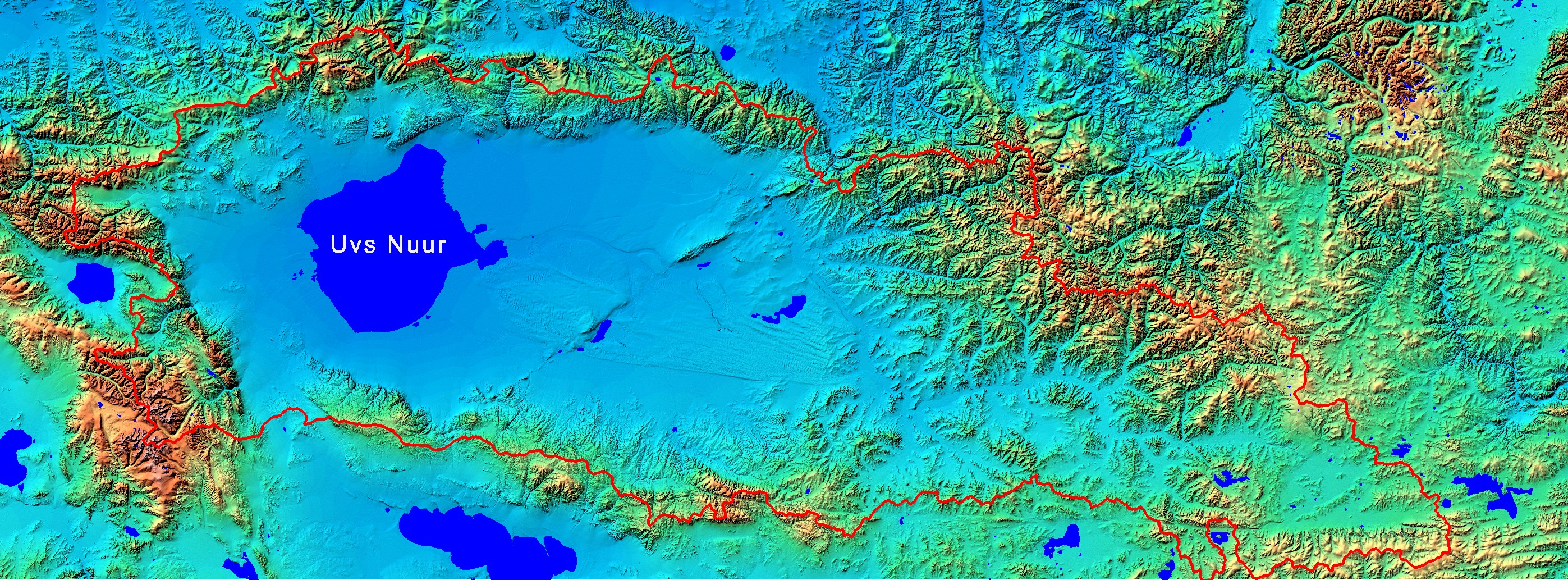
Uvs Lake and basin

Rivers draining into endorheic Uvs Lake, forming the drainage of the Uvs Lake Basin

- Kharkhiraa River
- Sangil gol
- Turuun River
- Nariin gol
- Tes River
  - Shavar River
  - Tsereg River
  - Khachig River
  - Erzin River

==== Khyargas Lake ====
- Zavkhan River

==== Dörgön Lake ====
- Teeliin gol, flowing out of Khar Lake
  - Chono Kharaikh gol, draining into Khar Lake

=== Ulungur Lake ===
- Bulgan River (Ulungur River)
