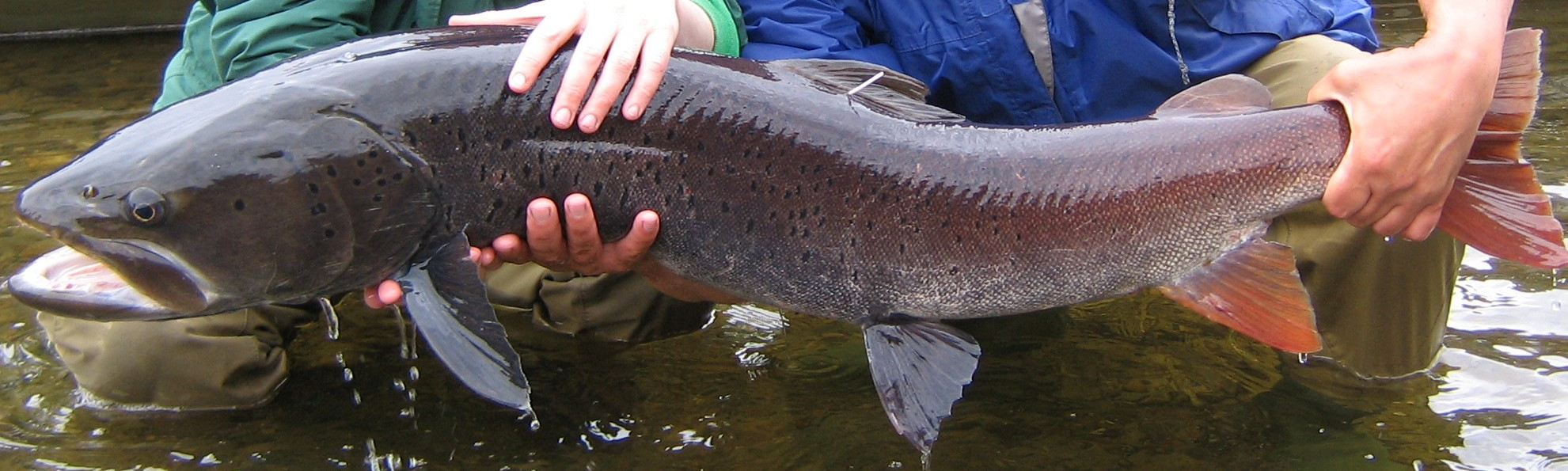

Conservation status
- Vulnerable (IUCN 3.1)

Scientific classification
- Kingdom: Animalia
- Phylum: Chordata
- Class: Actinopterygii
- Division: Teleostei
- Order: Salmoniformes
- Family: Salmonidae
- Genus: Hucho
- Species: H. taimen

Binomial name
- Hucho taimen Pallas, 1773

= Hucho taimen =

Species of fish

Siberian taimen (Hucho taimen), also known as the common taimen (Russian: Обыкнове́нный тайме́нь, romanized: Obyknovénnyy tayménʹ), Siberian giant trout or Siberian salmon, is a species of salmon-like ray-finned fish from the genus Hucho in the family Salmonidae. These fish are found in rivers in Siberia and adjacent regions, and are harvested throughout the year.

== Habits and range ==
The taimen is distributed from the Volga and Pechora River basins in the west to the Yana and Amur River basins in the east, spanning portions of Russia, Kazakhstan, Mongolia, and China. On a larger scale, this includes parts of the Caspian, Arctic, and Pacific drainages in Eurasia. In Mongolia, the taimen is found in both the Arctic and Pacific drainages, specifically the Yenisei/Selenga, the Lena, and the Amur River Basins. The taimen lives in flowing water and is only occasionally found in lakes, usually near the mouth of a tributary. The taimen is not anadromous, but does show increased movement rates during the spawning season. The average home range size of taimen in the Eg-Üur rivers of Mongolia is 23 kilometres (14 mi), but some tagged individuals show home ranges up to 93 kilometres (58 mi). Some authors consider the taimen to be a subspecies of the huchen, i.e. Hucho hucho taimen.

== Description ==
Coloration varies geographically, but is generally olive green on the head blending to reddish brown in the tail. Adipose, anal, and caudal fins are often dark red. The belly ranges from nearly white to dark gray. The taimen appears to be the largest salmonid in the world, being heavier at average and maximum sizes than the largest North American salmonid, the chinook salmon. Most mature fish caught weigh from 15 to 30 kg (33 to 66 lb). The average length is from 70 to 120 cm (28 to 47 in). The maximum length is about 150 to 180 cm (59 to 71 in). The maximum size is not assured, but supposedly a fish caught in the Kotui River in Russia in 1943 with a length of 210 cm (83 in) and a weight of 105 kg (231 lb) is the largest size recorded. The IGFA world record is 45.80 kg (101.0 lb) with a length of 150.00 cm (59.06 in). It can reach at least 55 years of age.

== Diet ==
Adult taimen are mainly piscivores, eating fish, though they frequently eat terrestrial prey such as rodents and birds.

== Angling and commercial use ==
The taimen is becoming a more well-known game fish, particularly for fly fishers. Catch-and-release with barbless hooks is practised in many areas to conserve dwindling populations of this species. Private angling operators such as Mongolia River Outfitters/Fish Mongolia work with organizations such as the Wild Salmon Center's Taimen Conservation Initiative to conserve the remaining populations. While the taimen is sometimes (often illegally) harvested commercially, its low price and slow growth and reproduction make it more valuable as a game fish.

== Conservation ==
The taimen has been assessed as vulnerable and in decline by the International Union for Conservation of Nature (IUCN). Taimen are a very sensitive species. Habitat degradation and disturbance caused by overgrazing, mining, motor boats, agriculture, and infrastructure development are primary threats. In addition, illegal fishing is a year round problem particularly in remote Mongolia. Additional challenges include the establishment of sand and gravel industries in Heilongjiang Province, China, industrial water pollution in Europe, commercial fishing in the Amur River region of Russia and China, and illegal sport fishing throughout its range and the impacts of climate change. The IUCN recommends that the fish be considered for inclusion in the Convention on Migratory Species to spur international cooperation on the conservation of this fully migratory species.

== Folklore ==
- Mongolian legend tells of a giant taimen trapped in river ice. Starving herders were able to survive the winter by hacking off pieces of its flesh. In the spring, the ice melted and the giant taimen climbed onto the land, tracked down the herders, and ate them all.
- According to Chinese folklore, a type of giant taimen lives in Kanas Lake in China. Villagers near Kanasi claim to have found fish weighing over 4 tonnes.
- National Geographic called the taimen the "Mongolian Terror Trout".
