= Uilgan River =

River in Mongolia

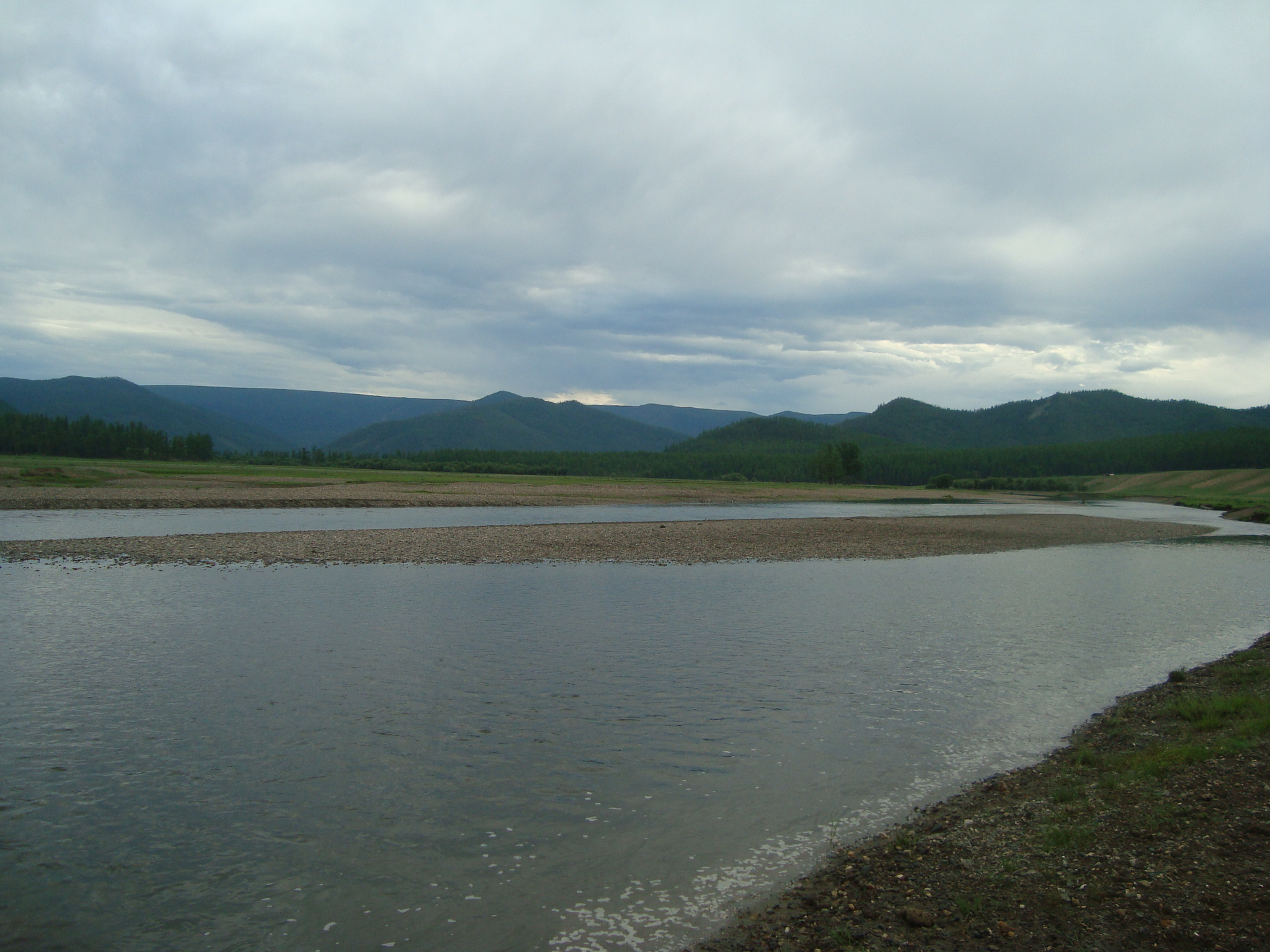

- Location of the mouth in Mongolia
- Native name: Уйлган гол (Mongolian)

Location
- Country: Mongolia
- Aimag: Khövsgöl
- Region: Tsagaan-Üür Sum

Physical characteristics
- Source
  - coordinates: 50°50′30″N 102°7′45″E
- Mouth: Üür River
  - coordinates: 50°28′40″N 101°44′30″E

Basin features
- Progression: Üür River→ Egiin Gol→ Selenga→ Lake Baikal→ Angara→ Yenisey→ Kara Sea

Uilgan River (Mongolian: Уйлган гол) is a river in the Tsagaan-Üür Sum of Khövsgöl Aimag in Mongolia.

It starts in the confluence of several smaller rivers near the Russian border, and discharges into the Üür River a bit downriver from the Tsagaan-Üür sum center and the mouth of the Arigiin River.

== See also ==
- List of rivers of Mongolia
