= Tarvagatai River =

River in Bulgan, Mongolia

- Native name: Тарвагатайн гол (Mongolian)

Location
- Country: Mongolia
- Aimag: Bulgan
- Region: Teshig sum

Physical characteristics
- Source
  - coordinates: 49°42′30″N 103°52′0″E
- Mouth: Egiin Gol
  - coordinates: 49°42′30″N 103°6′15″E

Basin features
- Progression: Egiin Gol→ Selenga→ Lake Baikal→ Angara→ Yenisey→ Kara Sea

Tarvagatai River (Mongolian: Тарвагатайн гол) is a river in the Teshig sum of Bulgan aimag in Mongolia. It starts about 30 km north of the sum center of Selenge sum in the Angarkhai mountain range, and discharges into the Egiin Gol ca 55 km west of that.

== See also ==
- List of rivers of Mongolia
