= Ongin inscription =

Turkic inscription

The Ongin inscription was discovered in 1891 in Mongolia near the Ongi River, 160 km south of the Orkhon inscriptions and 402 km south-west of the Tonyukuk inscriptions. It was erected in honor of El Etmish Yabgu and written in Yenisey script. Line 12 makes it clear that the author of the inscription erected a memorial to his father. According to Gerard Clauson, it must have been erected between 716 and 735, during the reign of Bilge Qaghan. According to Ercilasun it was erected in 719 or 720.

== Location ==
The Ongin inscription was discovered in 1891, in Mongolia on the Manet mountains, near a tributary of the Ongi River, from which it takes its name, at a point a little north-east of 46° N., 102° E., that is about 100 miles south of the Orkhon Inscriptions and some 250 miles west-southwest of the inscription of Tonyukuk.

== Discovery and translation ==
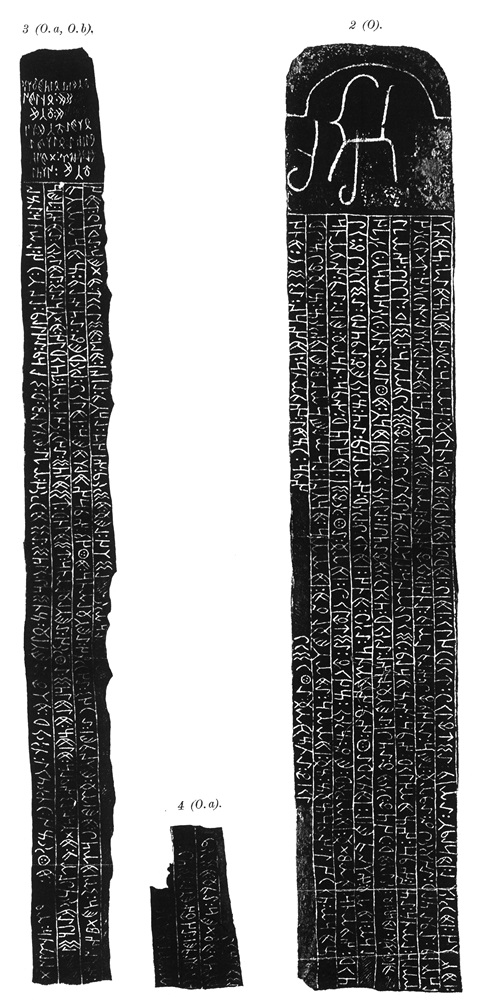
Ongin inscription

=== Region ===
It was found in district Maantyn Burd, the northwest coast of Ongi River in Övörkhangai Province of Mongolia.

=== Complete text ===
Following inscription text transcription and translation derived from latest research made by Osawa Takashi in 2011.

Transcription of original text:
äčümiz apamïz: (Note: An expression Ečü+müz : apa+mïz – is often met on literary monuments, means «Ата+мыз –our grand father, үлкен+іміз –our elder». In the Kazakh language, ana means aged woman, mother, elder sister and above mentioned use in ancient turkic language in combination «апа, әже» is still kept. In ancient mongolian language in words «ečige > эцэг» (grand father, father), «abu> аав» (father) the root of the word had been kept. In saryg-yugur language (yellow uygurs) «аба» means әке (father), «абқа»- ата (grand father), «абу»- туыс (relative). Malov S.E. The language of the yellow Uyghurs. Alma-Ata, 1957, p. 11.) yama qaγan: (Note: Jаmï : qaγan : Yiamy kagan is often identified as Yìlì Zhēndòu Qǐmín Kěhàn, (Baumer 2016:324) first Khagan of the Eastern Turkic Khaganate, who ruled from 599-614 or 603-606. W.Radloff identifies Yiamy kagan with Bumyn kagan, founder of the First Turkic Khaganate, basing on similarities of letter signs "b" and "y". (H.N.Orkhun); Bumyn kagan (S.E Malov), G.Aidarov, Yamï qaγan – (T.Tekin), Yamï qaγan – (L.Bold), I.Markwart, Yiamy kagan – is Bumyn//Tumyn, i.e.Ili-khan Tumyn (Il-khan i.e. ruler of people – N.Bichurin). the name of this kagan is not attested on other literary monuments.) tört buluŋuγ : qïsmïš # : yïgmïš : yaymïš : basmïš : ol qan : yoq : boltuqda : kesrä : elyitmiš : qačïš(mïš) : qa : ... altmïš : tägmiš : ... : elbägler : tabγač : qaγanladuq qaγanïn ïčγïnï : ïdmïš : türk bodun: (Note: Budun means «бүтін (whole), бой (height), толық (stout), дене (body), тұлға (trunk), ірі кесек (large)» are the derivatives of a morpheme boy-//bod-//bud-//büt. In modern kazakh language is kept in forms «бой (height), бүтін (whole), биік (tall), бұдан (from here)». «Түрік бұдұн» - ethno-cultural word meaning “the whole turkic people with large trunk comparing themselves with small chinese- tabgaches”.) öŋ # rä : kün : tuγsuqïŋa: (Note: On ancient turks tradition a door of a yurta was put from the eastern part. The parts of the world people also called facing to the east. Thus the right side (оң) - south (оңтүстік), left side (сол) – north (солтүстік), and behind in the back – west.) kesrä : kün : batsïqïŋa : tägi : beriyä : tabγačqa: (Note: Tabγač – chinese. In IV-Vi centuries AD. “Tabgaches // Tobaces” – nomadic ethnos, which ruled “north chinese” state of Vei (386–534). They are fully mixed with chinese, that is why ancient turks called all chinese people as tabgaches. Also “kidan // china” – the name of a nomadic ethnos, ruled the settled part of “chinese”.) yïraya : yïšqa(tä)g(i) : ... : qazγantuq : üčün : ol qïz oγlïn körti : alp ärin : balbal : qïšdï : türk bodun : atï yoq : bolu : barmïš : ärti : türk bodun : yitmäzün : teyin : yulïr ärmäzün : teyin : üzä : täŋri : temiš : ärig : ... nt a : ... : qapγan : elteriš : qaγan : eliŋä : qïlïntïm: (Note: Qïlïntïm – is usually translated as “was born”, “brought up”, it also has a meaning “served, worked”.) eletmïš yabγu: (Note: Yabγu – yabgu – title of a ruler after kagan, responsible for ethno-political power of Turkic El.) oγlï # : ïšbara : tamγan čor : yoγa : inisi : bilgä : ïšbara : tamγan : tarqan : yoγa : atï : beš : yetmiš : äčim atïm : at... : sü : äsiŋ : oγlï : tamγan bu : tabγačda : yïriyä : täg (Note: There are scientists, who did not translate the word “at eg” : (in 5-6-lines) marked as (tag?,tig ?- W.Radloff), but some scientists explain «beg» as (begs-oguzes – S.Malov, K.Sartkozha), «teg» as (sraight, before – H.Orkhun), («Atig» ethnic name – T.Tekin), «tig» as (“strong” – A.S.Amanzholov). There is no reason to consider this expression as some ethnic name. The lines on the monument “ekin ara : at eg yaγï : bolmuš : ” (10-line), “at eg : yaγï : ermiš : ” (5,6-lines) probably mean “the horserider was an enemy”.) oγuz : ara : yeti ärin : yaγï : # bolmïš : qaŋïm (Note: The word Аqaŋïm lately is read as qaŋïm (father). In modern kazakh language is kept in forms 1. aqa > ake > father; 2. qaqa > qake > köke > ake > и aqa > elder brother) baγa : täŋrikän : yanïnta : yorïmïš : išig : küčin : bermiš : ärtmiš : (käl)[miš)... : tarduš : boltuqda : täŋrikänkä išig bertiŋ : teyin : yarlïqamïš : šad atïγ : ant # a : bermiš : boltuqda : toquz : oγuz : täg : yaγï : ärmiš : bädük : är(miš :) qaγan : täg(miš) ... : biz bädük biz : biz bat biz : biz : yavïz bat biz : azïγ üküšüg : körtüg : irti : sülätim # : ter ärmiš : amtï bäglärïm a : ter : ärmiš : biz : az biz : teyin al # qïnur : (ärtimiz) : ... : yorïyïn : sü : süläyïn : qaŋïm : š(ad) : anča : ötünmiš : täŋrikän : almazïn teyin # : ... : bodun : anta bermäziŋ ä : tusul är ... : (atačïm a) ... d ... qamuq balïqqa : (tägdim) : qonuldïm : altïm : süsi : kälti : arqasï#n : yaγdïm : bägi : qačdï : / š / γ ärti : tabγač bodunï : ... : toqïdtïm : yaγdïm : bas(dïm : yaydïm :) ... buzuq anča : ... : ...mäz : ärïnč : išig küčig bert(im) : ... kälir : ärtimiz : ekin ara : täg yaγï : bolmïš : tägmäči # män teyin : saqïntïm : täŋri bilgä : qaγanqa : ančaqïŋa : išig küčüg : bersägim : bar : ärmiš : ärinč : tägdük(in) (üčün) ... # äbimä tägdüküm : ur elï qaŋ elï : adrïlmalïm : täyin : qaγanda : adrïlmaz : teyin : tägdim : tägip : inima : oγlïma : anča : ötlädim : qaŋ : yorïp : elteriš qaγanqa # : adrïlmaduq : yaŋïlmaduq : täŋri : bilgä : qaγanta : adrïlmalïm : azmalïm : teyin : anča : ötlädim : ilgärü barïγma : bardï # : bilgä qaγan : bodunï ... : bardï # : ölügin : atqa : išig küčig : bertim : adrïlmaz : teyin : tägdim : üzä : täŋri : qan : lüi : yïlqa : yetinč: (Note: ülüi : yïlqa : jetinč ay - ұлу : жылғы : жетiншi ай (the seventh month of a dragon year) – we think that it is 682 – 716. On twelve years animal circle of chronology 631, 643, 655, 667, 679, 691, 703, 716, 728, 740, 752, 764 ... correspond to a dragon year. If pay attention to facts that Ilteris kagan ruled in 682–691, Kapagan kagan – in 691 – 716, then it can be determined, that Ongin monument was established between 682 and 716. Exactly in 703.) ay küčlüg : alp är : qaγanïmda : adrïlu : bardïŋïz : bilgä : atačïm : yoγuŋ : qorïγïŋïn : qazγantïm : el yetti : täŋri : üzä : täŋrikän : ... (tabγa)č körür : ärtim : ädgü : atačïm : ... : toqïdïmïz : äčim boyla : ... girtim : ... basatïp ärig : udušuru : sančdïm : ... išig : küčig: kü... ičün : ...dim : ... atačïm : ... : ...n : täg : ïšbara : tarqanïγ : ... # elteriš : qaγan : ...
Transcription of the text in south side of the headstone:
atačïmqa : bitig : tašï qïldïm : bäŋigü qaγanïm : atačïm bilgä : atačïm : lü yïlqa : bilgä : uluγ : alp är : ädgü qan: (Note: Esbara Tamgan Chur Yoga – (bitikshi) a creator of the monument Ongin. That is why he wrote alp er : edgü qan : Atačïm : ölti : (ұлық алып ер : игi хан : Атачым : өлдi : - a great glorious man : respectful khan : my grandfather : died. These lines in previous researches were translated as külüg er : edgü qan : tačam : ölti : (glorious man, noble khan Tacham died – W.Radloff, S.Malov, H.N.Orkhun (“даңқты ер игi хан аташым өлдi – the glorious man, respectful khan : my grandfather : died”- T.Tekin, G.Aidarov, L.Bold). If to believe the photos taken by N.M.Yadrintzev then is not clear why W.Radloff read the letter signs uluγ alp er : as külüg er : (uluγ alp er – A.S.Amanzholov, K.Sartkozha.)) atačïm : ölti
Transcription of text on balbal:
Ïsbara Tamγan balbalï (Note: There is carved words \'Esbara : Tarqan : balbalï\' on one of balbals of the monument complex. Bilge Esbara Tamgan Tarkhan is brother of late Il Etmish Yabgu, who participated in the process of mourning (yoγï). Here the investigation of the word balbal, which is met not often in texts of turkic written language and it is thought that balbal is a funeral stone of each killed enemy by a dead person some scientists consider, that balbals were purposefully established for tethering horses during funeral procession, mourning and funeral repast. The word balbal consists of repeated words bal+bal > balbal and means straightly put, stuck into the ground stones. The word balbal has similar root with the words as balγa (балға - hammer), balta (балта - axe), bal- (соғу – to beat, қағу – to drive in, ұру – to hit), balïq (1. балшық - clay, батпақ - marsh, лай - mud; 2. қала - city, қорған - fortification, қамал - fortress) and others and has general semantic meaning “to stay in a row, to pierce, to be erected”. There are Ongin lines on a literary monument Alp : erin : balbal : qïsdï : (алып : ердiң : балбалы (н) : көтерді//қадады –glorious man : established// pierces). It should be said here that tamga of kagan’s family on balbals from the Ongin complex means that these are not the funeral stones of killed enemies, in the contrary, people, participated in the process of mourning (yoγï) set these balbals, hoping that they would help the spirit of the late to fly away to the Sky (uča bar – fled away) and set them up one by one towards east.)

English translation:
It was said that our ancestor, our forefather Yama Qaγan compressed, assembled, enlarged and made a surprise attack on the four corners (of the world). It was said that when that qaγan died, his people lost their way and they were scattered. And it is said that he organized the peoples and attacked to ... It is said that leaders (Begs) of the Turkic country completely lost the qaγan whom the Tabγač (i. e. Chinese) had made their ruler. Up to the front (eastern) side where sun rises, up to the black (western) side where sun sets, up to the right (southern) side where the Tabgach existed, up to the left (northern) side where the wooden Mountains existed, Turkic peoples were victorious (against the ... and ...) His daughters and sons (i. e. Turkic daughters and sons) served him (literally, he saw his daughters and sons). They constructed brave warriors as Balbal stones. "The fame of the Turkic peoples has vanished. You, Turkic peoples, don't go to ruin!" and "You, Turkic peoples, don't scatter", the God Täŋri said above. They ... warriors ... there ... I was born in the country of Qapγan, Elteriš Qaγan. I was a son of Eletmiš Yabγu, and the younger brother of Ïšbara Tamγan Čor Yoγa, and I had the name of Bilgä Ïšbara Tamγan Tarqan Yoγa. (I and) my 65 uncles younger than my father and nephews (or grandsons), ... , "Make the military go ahead in a hurry!". It was said that his son Tamγan became the enemy with the seven warriors among Oγuz tribes up to the northern regions of this Tabγač (China). It was narrated that my father went to march taking side with Baγa Täŋrikän, and he served (Baγa Täŋrikän) and he has passed. ... , when he became Tarduš, "You served the Täŋrikän" it was said that (Täŋrikän) told and appointed him a title of Šad at that time. It was said when he became Šad, he opposed up to the Toquz Oγuz. It was said (the enemy) was strong. It was said that Qaγan went ahead. ... "We are strong. We don't have advantage. We are in a bad way and worthy very little. You have seen how few we are and how many they are. They were annoyed. We marched", he had said. "Now, my lords (begs), ah!" he had said. "We are small forth, aren't we" he said and "We were exhausted ... , I want to march, I want our army to march" said he. And my father Šad addressed as follows, "Don't let Täŋrikän plunder!" said he. ... And "My peoples, you don't give him something from here, ah. Please be useful! ... My dear father, you, ah" I attacked all cities, and I settled down. His army came (against me). Then i attacked from behind, the lord (beg) escaped, and they were ... The Tabγač people did ... , I made (my army) attack and I attacked (them). I overwhelmed and broke into pieces. (They) fell into ... , then it is certain that they did not ... I served (him) ... , We came and we became enemies against them as far as to the location between the two groups. "I am not willing to attack (them)" I thought. I have a desire to serve Täŋri Bilgä Qaγan at least, certainly. They attacked me ... I went to my house. "The people of sons' generation and fathers' generation (of my family), you, don't be apart" said and "Let us not be apart from the Qaγan" said and I marched. I attacked, and I advised my little brothers and my sons as follows: "My father marched ahead and he did not make a mistake against Elteriš Qaγan". "Let us not be apart from Täŋri Bilgä Qaγan and not leave him." said I and also said as follows: "Ones who went ahead went. The peoples of Bilgä Qaγan went away, ... Regarding death in battle as an honour, I served him. Let us not be apart (from him)", I marched ahead. Over, Täŋri Qan, you went away separating from my Qaγan that was strong and brave warrior in June of the Lüi (Dragon) year, my dear and wise father! I could hold funeral services for you and I got your pasture. He organized his country. Over the sky Täŋrikän and the China were subjugated. ... I subjugated the China. My dear and good father! ... We attacked. My uncle, Boyla ... He entered (or He was subjugated) ... I made attack (the enemy ?), and then ran after him and speared him. ... (I) served ... I did ... my dear father ... ïsbara tarqan such as ... elteriš qaγan ...
Translation of the text in south side of the headstone:
For my dear father, stone epitaph i constructed. Eternal, my qaγan, my dear father, wise and my dear father, in the lü (dragon) year, wise, great and brave warrior, good qan, my dear father died.
Translation of text on balbal:
Balbal of Ïsbara Tamγan

== Oirad Translation ==
The Onginsk Inscription, Passage 3

Turkic translation (Malov 1959): He put their hero-husbands as balbals ... the name of the Turkic people began to decline “may the Turkic people not be destroyed, may they not be the victims! ", - above the Tengri-Sky, perhaps, (so) said.

Oirad Translation: The stelae for the tributary state. The fallen Turku military officers captured the Tuyekhu slaves. The Turku military officers, having their [own] state, contested the taiji princes of the Uyghurs, and the passed away (“seeing the Tengri”) Rurans

Oirad Transcription: AL-PA (tributary) OR-AN (state) BA-L-BA-L (slab, stelae, p. 79) ÜK-S-R-I (died) T-Ü-R-KÜ B-O-D-N (military officers) TU-I-Y-KU (Tuyuhu people) B-O-L-O (slave) B-A-R-M-S (taken, captured) OR-AT-AI (ora-tai with statehood) T-Ü-R-KU B-O-D-N (military officers) J-I-T-M-Z-N (contested, disputed) T-J-N (prince) Y-U-L-KU-R-M-Z-N (Uyghurs) T-J-N (prince) U-Z-E (face, see) TE-NG-RI (tengri) OT (otg, administrative region) R-R-M-S (Rouran)

The Onginsk Inscription, Passage 6:

Turkic Translation (Malov 1959): Saying, you worked for the divine (tengri), he was merciful and then gave the title shad. After that nine Oguz- begs were the enemies. Being significant and divine became tired

Oirad Translation: When the Tengri-Person dies, Yisuge shall draft the governing decrees to Taijin-Princes. Together with the Saids he shall govern here. The Tengri person to govern the Tukz, Ugz, Tege, and Uyghurs territories.

Revised Transcription: TE-NG-R-I (Tengri) KÜ-N(person) UK-A ( if/when dies) Y-SU-GE (name Yisuge) JU-R-TA-NG (plan govern) T-J-N (taijin prince) J-R-L-K-M-S (sent a decree) SA-DU-T-GA (with the sääd political elite) END-E (here) YU-R-M-S (plan-govern) B-O-L-T-K-D-A (shall be) T-U-K-Z (Tokuz) U-G-Z (Oguz) TE-GE (Tege) Y-G-I-R-M-S (Uyghurs) B-D-KU (staying) OR-M-S (territories) TE-NG-RI (Tengri) KU-N (person) Y-U-R (plan-govern)

The Onginsk Inscription, Passage 7:

Turkic Translation (Malov 1959): We were bad and worthless. We considered (saw) the small as great. He said, “I fought.” Now he said to his begs, “There are a few of us.” Saying, he was afraid.

Oirad Translation: Legal scholars and writers must be sent immediately, brought from the Rouran regions, earlier populated by the Rourans. The whole lineage group of the Rourans is prosecuted. The Turku are the predestined ruling taijin-princes.

Oirad Transcription: JO’-B-ZH (legal scholars) B-T-E-I-ZH (scribe, writer) ZU-G-U (send) UK-US-GE (express) KU-U-R-T-G (must) I-R-T-I (come) O’S-U-CH-T-M (populated) OT-R-R-M-S (otg=administrative division Rou-ran) OM-TO-I (omg= whole lineage group) YA-GA-L-R-M-A (indict, accuse, denounce) OT-R-R-M-S (otg Rou-ran) E-Z (ruler, owner) ZA-YA-ZH (predestined) T-J-N (prince) T-U-R-K (turks)

The Onginsk Inscription, Side 2, Passage 4:

Turkic Translation (Malov 1959): The tengri khan is above In the seventh month of the year of the dragon you (left) separated from the strong heroic khagan Wise Tacham, I through your burial acquired passed to me your gifts (jewels) Homeland, deity … He went to the Tabgach.

Oirad Translation: The fallen (seeing Tengri) khans contested power over many years, conquering and expanding the tribute states. To recognize/remember that the Yungang and Luoyang grottoes were completed before Shubo Nche-tu’s death.

Revised Transcription: U-Z-E (seeing) T-NG-R-I (tengri) K-A-N (khan) OL-Ü-I (many) J-I-L-K-E (years) J-T-I-NCH-J (contested) K-Ü-CH-L-G (power) AL-PA (tribute) K-G-N-M-D-A (khanates) D-R-L-U (subjugated) B-R-D-NG-ZH (took) Y-I-L-G (recognize, distinguish) T-CH-M (that) Y-U-G-NG (Yu-Köng, Köng=cave Yungang,) L-U-R-G-NG-N (Luoyang, Lur-Köng, Köng=cave) K-Z-G-ND-M (Completed) (SU) B-CH-R (Shubo also Nche-tu’s name) T-NG-R-I (tengri) U-D-…-CH KÜ-I-R-Ü-R (death) R-T-I (before)
