= Arigiin River =

River in Khövsgöl, Mongolia

- Native name: Аригийн гол (Mongolian)

Location
- Country: Mongolia
- Aimags: Khövsgöl aimag

Physical characteristics
- Source: Döm Mountain
  - location: Chandmani-Öndör sum
  - coordinates: 50°13′20″N 100°37′15″E
- Mouth: Üür River
  - location: Tsagaan-Üür sum
  - coordinates: 50°30′50″N 101°34′50″E

Basin features
- Progression: Üür River→ Egiin Gol→ Selenga→ Lake Baikal→ Angara→ Yenisey→ Kara Sea

Arigiin River (Mongolian: Аригийн гол) is a river in the Khövsgöl aimag of Mongolia. It starts next to Döm Mountain in the confluence of two smaller rivers at the border between Alag-Erdene and Chandmani-Öndör sums, continuing through the latter. It discharges into the Üür River next to the Tsagaan-Üür sum center.

== See also ==
- List of rivers of Mongolia
