= Tes River =

River in Mongolia and Russia

Tes River Тес-Хем, Tes Xem
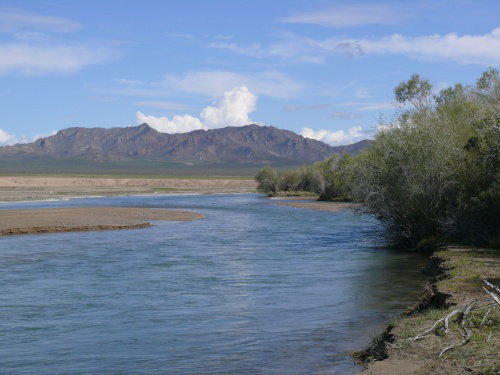
- Native name: Тэс гол (Mongolian)

Location
- Country: Mongolia, Russia
- Mongolian Aimags: Khövsgöl, Zavkhan
- Russian Region: Tuva

Physical characteristics
- Source: Shavar Türüü
  - location: Bulnain Nuruu, Tsagaan-Uul, Mongolia
- Mouth: Uvs Nuur
  - location: Tes, Uvs, Mongolia
  - coordinates: 50°28′35″N 93°03′58″E
  - elevation: 759 m (2,490 ft)
- Length: 568 km (353 mi)
- Basin size: 33,368 km^{2} (12,883 sq mi)

Basin features
- Tributaries
  - right: Shavar River, Tsereg River, Khachig River, Erzin River

The Tes River (Mongolian: Тэсийн гол; Tuvan: Тес-Хем; Old Turkic: 𐱅𐰔, romanized: Tez) is a river in northwestern Mongolia and southern Tuva, Russia. Its spring is in Tsagaan-Uul sum in Khövsgöl. The river then flows through Zavkhan (Mongolia), Tuva (Russia), next back to Uvs (Mongolia) before entering Uvs Lake. While in Khövsgöl, there is a wooden bridge near Tsetserleg and a concrete bridge near Bayantes on the road to Kyzyl, Russia.

The Tes River is primary source of the Uvs Lake. A large section of the river, from where it enters the Uvs Province to its mound in the lake, is included in the Uvs Nuur Basin UNESCO World Heritage Site.

== See also ==
- List of rivers of Mongolia
