= Erzin (river) =

Kantegir

Location
- Country: Russia

Physical characteristics
- Mouth: Tes-Khem
  - coordinates: 50°17′50″N 95°04′59″E
- Length: 139 km (86 mi)
- Basin size: 4,390 km^{2} (1,690 sq mi)

Basin features
- Progression: Tes-Khem→ Uvs Lake

The Erzin (Russian: Эрзин) is a river of Tuva, Russia. It is a right tributary of the Tes-Khem. It is 139 kilometres (86 mi) long, and has a drainage basin of 4,390 square kilometres (1,690 sq mi).
