= Baruunturuun =

District in Uvs Province, Mongolia

Baruunturuun District Баруунтуруун сум ᠪᠠᠷᠠᠭᠤᠨᠲᠤᠷᠤᠭᠤᠨᠰᠤᠮᠤ
- District
- Interactive map of Baruunturuun District
- Coordinates: 49°39′30″N 94°23′57″E
- Country: Mongolia

Area
  - Total: 3,452 km^{2} (1,333 sq mi)
- Elevation: 1,232 m (4,042 ft)

Population (2008)
  - Total: 2,810
- Time zone: UTC+7

Baruunturuun (Mongolian: Баруунтуруун; "western Turuun") is a sum in Uvs Province of Mongolia.

It is the heartland of grain production in the province, and lies on the bank of the Turuun River. The sum is also one of the most populous areas in the province. MIAT Mongolian Airlines flew to Baruunturuun directly from Ulaanbaatar until 2005, but stopped due to a plane shortage. Although the Baruunturuun Airport is not operational at the moment, it is considered the secondary airport of the province.

== Climate ==
Baruunturuun has a continental climate (Köppen Dwb, Trewartha Dcld) closely bordering on a subarctic climate (Köppen Dwc, Trewartha Ecld) with mild to warm summers and bitterly cold winters even for Mongolia, owing to very strong altitudinal temperature inversions from drainage of cold air into the western valleys.

Baruunturuun experiences 209.9 mornings per year with minimum temperature below the freezing point and 151 afternoons in which the maximum temperature is below such threshold. The average minimum temperature in January is −36.3 °C (−33.3 °F), and the lowest recorded temperature was −49.9 °C (−57.8 °F). Temperatures in summer can be hot; on 10.9 afternoons per year the daily maximum temperature is at or above 30.0 °C (86.0 °F). The highest temperature recorded is 39.2 °C (102.6 °F). Most precipitation falls in the summer as rain, with some snow in the spring and autumn. Winters are quite dry, with only light snowfall. The average wind speed does not exceed 1 metre per second (3.6 km/h) in winter.

Climate data for Baruunturuun, elevation 1,234 m (4,049 ft), (1991–2020 normals, extremes 1961–2020)
Month	Jan	Feb	Mar	Apr	May	Jun	Jul	Aug	Sep	Oct	Nov	Dec	Year
Record high °C (°F)	4.9 (40.8)	4.9 (40.8)	17.6 (63.7)	28.4 (83.1)	31.5 (88.7)	35.7 (96.3)	39.2 (102.6)	35.8 (96.4)	33.5 (92.3)	23.9 (75.0)	13.5 (56.3)	13.0 (55.4)	39.2 (102.6)
Mean daily maximum °C (°F)	−24.7 (−12.5)	−21.8 (−7.2)	−10.4 (13.3)	5.1 (41.2)	17.6 (63.7)	23.0 (73.4)	23.7 (74.7)	22.3 (72.1)	16.6 (61.9)	6.1 (43.0)	−7.5 (18.5)	−20.8 (−5.4)	2.4 (36.4)
Daily mean °C (°F)	−31.4 (−24.5)	−28.3 (−18.9)	−18.4 (−1.1)	−1.6 (29.1)	10.1 (50.2)	15.9 (60.6)	17.1 (62.8)	15.3 (59.5)	8.9 (48.0)	−0.7 (30.7)	−14.3 (6.3)	−26.6 (−15.9)	−4.5 (23.9)
Mean daily minimum °C (°F)	−36.3 (−33.3)	−35.0 (−31.0)	−24.7 (−12.5)	−7.5 (18.5)	2.6 (36.7)	8.2 (46.8)	10.9 (51.6)	8.8 (47.8)	2.7 (36.9)	−6.3 (20.7)	−19.9 (−3.8)	−31.5 (−24.7)	−10.7 (12.8)
Record low °C (°F)	−49.9 (−57.8)	−45.9 (−50.6)	−40.6 (−41.1)	−30.2 (−22.4)	−12.2 (10.0)	−8.6 (16.5)	0.0 (32.0)	−4.8 (23.4)	−12.0 (10.4)	−25.8 (−14.4)	−37.9 (−36.2)	−47.1 (−52.8)	−49.9 (−57.8)
Average precipitation mm (inches)	3.8 (0.15)	4.2 (0.17)	7.0 (0.28)	13.9 (0.55)	22.5 (0.89)	32.6 (1.28)	58.0 (2.28)	45.7 (1.80)	25.3 (1.00)	13.7 (0.54)	12.6 (0.50)	6.7 (0.26)	246 (9.7)
Average precipitation days (≥ 1.0 mm)	2	2.1	2.5	3.6	4.2	5.7	7.8	6.5	4.3	3.2	3.6	2.7	48.2
Average relative humidity (%)	76	75.8	78.6	60.8	47.8	51	56.6	58.4	56.8	62.7	78.2	79.5	65.2
Average dew point °C (°F)	−33.5 (−28.3)	−30.0 (−22.0)	−18.8 (−1.8)	−6.0 (21.2)	−1.2 (29.8)	5.5 (41.9)	9.2 (48.6)	7.5 (45.5)	0.8 (33.4)	−6.1 (21.0)	−14.8 (5.4)	−27.0 (−16.6)	−9.5 (14.8)
Source: NOAA (temperature averages 1961-1990)

== Administrative divisions ==
The district is divided into four bags, which are:

- Bayan-Airag
- Shand
- Turuun
- Zuun Turuun
