= Kharkhiraa River =

River in Uvs, Mongolia

Coordinates: 50°04′0″N 92°26′30″E

Location
- Country: Mongolia
- Aimags: Uvs

Physical characteristics
- Source
  - location: Kharkhiraa
- Mouth: Uvs Lake
  - location: Uvs, Mongolia

The Kharkhiraa River is a river in the Uvs Province of Mongolia.

The Kharkhiraa River flows from the Kharkhiraa in the west to the east. It is one of the rivers flowing into Uvs Lake and one of the important rivers in Uvs Province.

== See also ==
- List of rivers of Mongolia
