= Tsagaan-Uul, Khövsgöl =

District in Khövsgöl Province, Mongolia

Coordinates: 49°36′N 98°42′E

Tsagaan-Uul District Цагаан-Уул сум ᠴᠠᠭᠠᠨᠠᠭᠤᠯᠠᠰᠤᠮᠤ
- District
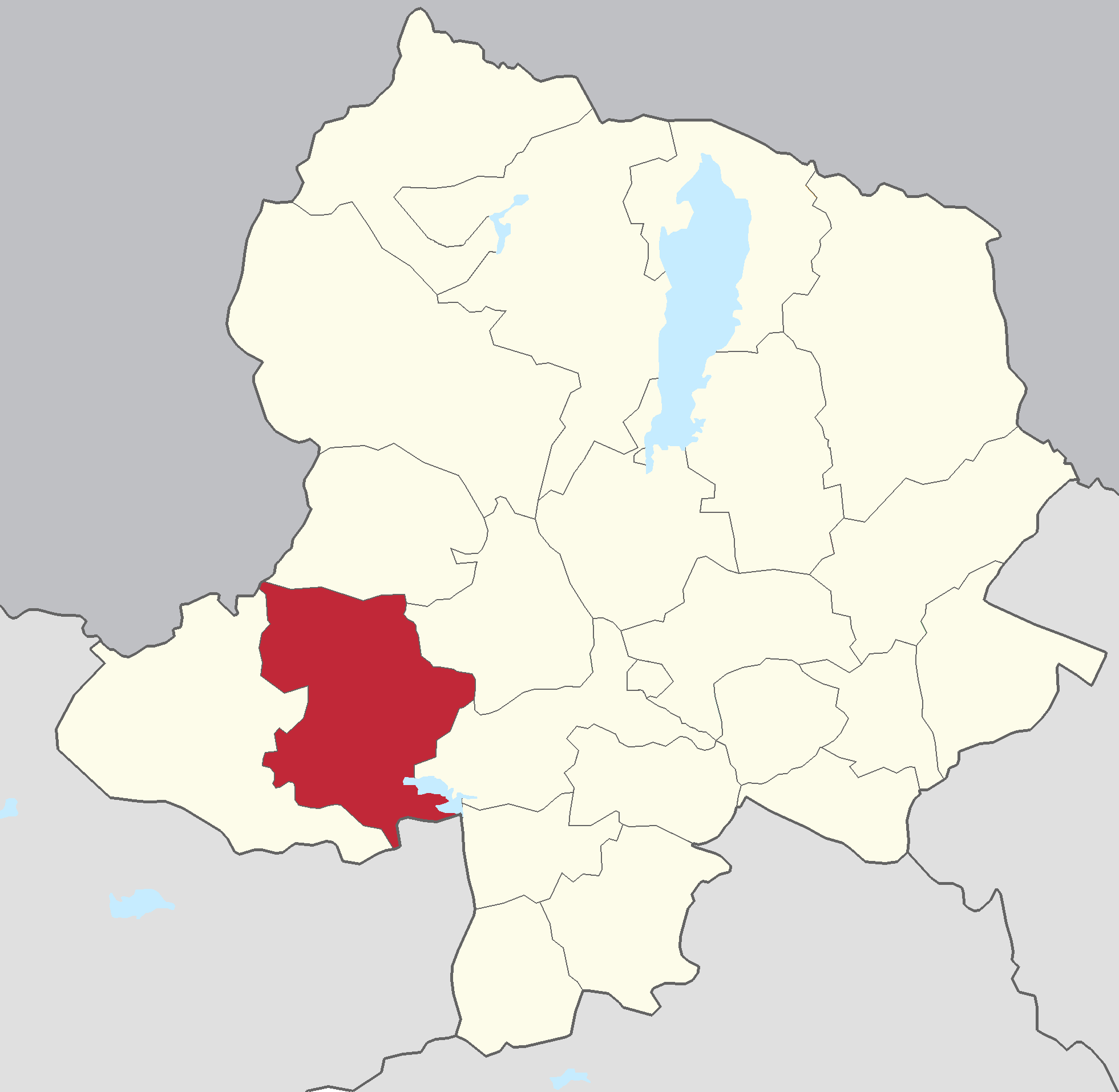
- Tsagaan-Uul District in Khövsgöl Province
- Country: Mongolia
- Province: Khövsgöl Province
- Time zone: UTC+8 (UTC + 8)

Tsagaan-Uul (Mongolian: Цагаан-Уул, lit. "white mountain") is a sum of Khövsgöl aimag. The area is about 5,870 km², of which 5,190 km² are pasture. In 2005, the sum had 5145 inhabitants, mainly Khalkha and Khotgoid. The center officially named Sharga (Mongolian: Шарга), is located 138 km west of Mörön and 840 kilometers from Ulaanbaatar.

== History ==
The Tsagaan-Uul sum was founded, together with the whole Khövsgöl aimag, in 1931. In 1933, it had about 3,800 inhabitants in 1150 households, and about 101,000 heads of livestock. In 1959, parts of Tsagaan-Uul were carved out to form Bürenkhaan sum, in 1963 Sharga sum was joined to Tsagaan-Uul, and in 1973 Bürenkhaan sum was dissolved again and partially joined to Tsagaan-Uul. The local negdel, under the name Badral, was founded in 1956.

== Administrative divisions ==
The district is divided into six bags, which are:

- Agar
- Jargalant
- Khujirt
- Sharga
- Toson
- Uvgud

== Economy ==
In 2004, there were roughly 158,000 heads of livestock, among them 81,000 sheep, 61,000 goats, 7,600 cattle and yaks, 8,700 horses, and 640 camels.

== Interesting places ==
The sum borders Sangiin Dalai nuur. In 1976, a Uighur stele was found near the origin of the Tesiin gol river.

== Literature ==
M.Nyamaa, Khövsgöl aimgiin lavlakh toli, Ulaanbaatar 2001, p. 192f
