= Tsetsgeegiin Mönkhbayar =

Tsetsgeegiin Mönkhbayar (Mongolian: Цэцгээгийн Мөнхбаяр) is a Mongolian herdsman and environmental activist.

Mönkhbayar was elected to chair the local citizens' council in the Ongi River region 1996, after actively participating in meetings for some time. In 2001 he co-founded the Ongi River Movement, which eventually led to establishment of the Mongolian Nature Protection Coalition uniting 11 Mongolian river movements.

After 1990, more than 30 companies were licensed to mine for gold on the Ongi River and its tributaries. Illegal mining practises and weak law enforcement resulted in contamination and depletion of the river. With the Ongi River Movement, Mönkhbayar convinced the Mongolian Government and Parliament to pass and enforce more restrictive laws in 2006. Erel Mining Company was shut down, and the other mining businesses were forced to use more sustainable methods. This has led to a significant improvement of the quality and amount of water in the river.

He was arrested on 2013 and condemned to 21 years in prison. Later he was sentenced to 7 years in prison for attempting to enter a protected area of the Government House with a firearm and open fire. He was pardoned in 2015.

For outstanding environmental achievement in Asia, the 2007 Goldman Environmental Prize was awarded to Tsetsgeegiin Mönkhbayar
