= Tsagaan-Üür, Khövsgöl =

District in Khövsgöl Province, Mongolia

Coordinates: 50°32′18″N 101°31′08″E

Tsagaan-Üür District Цагаан-Үүр сум ᠴᠠᠭᠠᠨᠡᠭᠦᠷᠰᠤᠮᠤ
- District
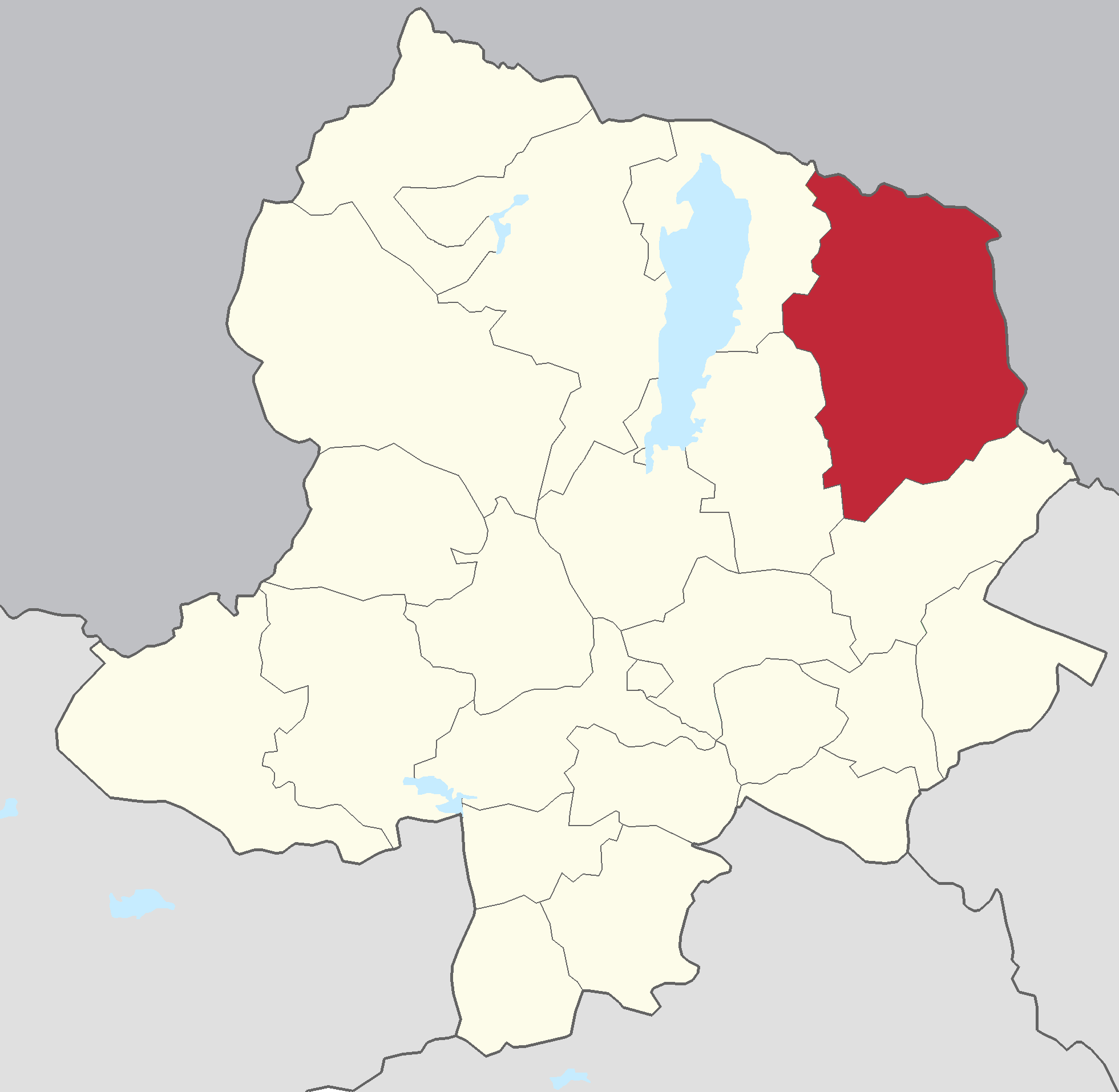
- Location within Khövsgöl aimag
- Country: Mongolia
- Province: Khövsgöl Province
- Time zone: UTC+8 (UTC + 8)

Tsagaan-Üür (Mongolian: Цагаан-Үүр, white dawn) is a sum of Khövsgöl aimag. The area is 8,730 km^{2}, of which only 1,140 km^{2} are pasture. In 2000, Tsagaan-Üür had a population of 2,421 people, including Khalkha, Uriankhai, and Buriad. The sum center, officially named Bulgan (Mongolian: Булган), is located on the banks of the Üür River, 173 km north-east of Mörön and 844 km from Ulaanbaatar.

== History ==
The Tsagaan-Üür sum was founded, together with the whole Khövsgöl aimag, in 1931. In 1933, it had 2,400 inhabitants in 690 households, and about 22,000 head of livestock. The local negdel, first named Uilgan and later Tsog, was founded in 1939.

== Administrative divisions ==
The district is divided into four bags, which are:

- Bulgan
- Darkhint
- Uur
- Uyalgan

== Economy ==
In 2004, there were about 22,000 head of livestock, among them 3,400 goats, 3,900 sheep, 11,300 cattle and yaks, and 3,400 horses, but no camels.

== Miscellanea ==
About 35 km east of the sum center is a cave known as Dayan deerkhiin agui. Tsagaan-Üür, especially the Uilgan River valley, is famous for its wrestlers.

== Literature ==
M. Nyamaa, Khövsgöl aimgiin lavlakh toli, Ulaanbaatar 2001, p. 195f
