= Uvs Lake =

Lake in Uvs, Mongolia

- Увс нуур (Mongolian); ᠤᠪᠰᠤ ᠨᠠᠭᠤᠷ (Mongolian)
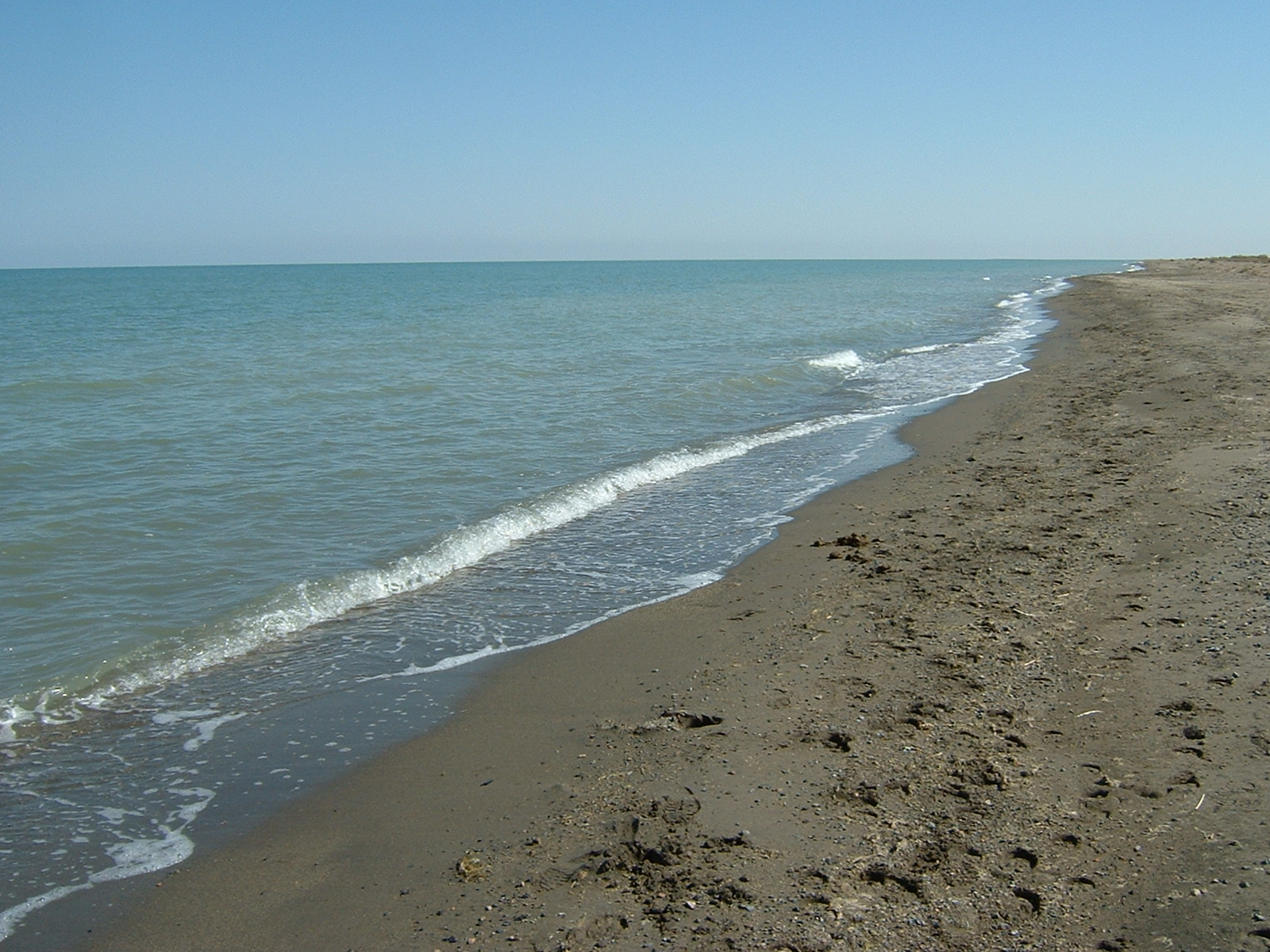

- Location within Mongolia
- Coordinates: 50°18′N 92°42′E
- Type: Saline
- Primary inflows: Tesiin gol、Kharkhiraa River、Turuun River
- Primary outflows: none
- Basin countries: Mongolia and Russia
- Max. length: 84 km (52 mi)
- Max. width: 79 km (49 mi)
- Surface area: 3,350 km^{2} (1,290 sq mi)
- Average depth: 6 m (20 ft)
- Surface elevation: 759 m (2,490 ft)
- Settlements: Ulaangom

Ramsar Wetland
- Official name: Lake Uvs and its surrounding wetlands
- Designated: 22 March 2004
- Reference no.: 1379

Uvs Lake (Mongolian: Увс нуур [ˌʊɸs‿ˈnʊːr], ᠤᠪᠰᠤ ᠨᠠᠭᠤᠷ [ubsu naɣur]) is a highly saline lake, contained within the endorheic basin named after it—Uvs Nuur Basin. It is primarily located in Mongolia, with a smaller part in Russia. It is the largest lake in Mongolia by surface area, covering 3,350 km^{2} at 759 m above sea level. The northeastern tip of the lake is situated in the Tuva Republic of the Russian Federation. The largest settlement near the lake is Ulaangom. This shallow and very saline body of water is a remainder of a huge saline sea which covered a much larger area several thousand years ago.

== Name ==
The name Uvs Nuur (sometimes spelled Ubsa Nor or Ubsunur) derives from subsen, a Turkic/Mongolian word referring to the bitter dregs left behind in the making of airag (Mongolian fermented mare milk drink), and nuur, the Mongolian word for lake. The name is a reference to the lake's salty, undrinkable water. In one Mongolian folk tale a character named Sartaktai, known for digging wondrous canals and setting courses for rivers, tries to connect Uvs Lake to another nearby lake by digging a canal between them. But when the water of Uvs Lake refuses to flow, Sartaktai angrily declares "Be thy name Subsennor!" A name that is defined as "bad wine, dregs of the spirit that comes from the still..."

== Geography ==
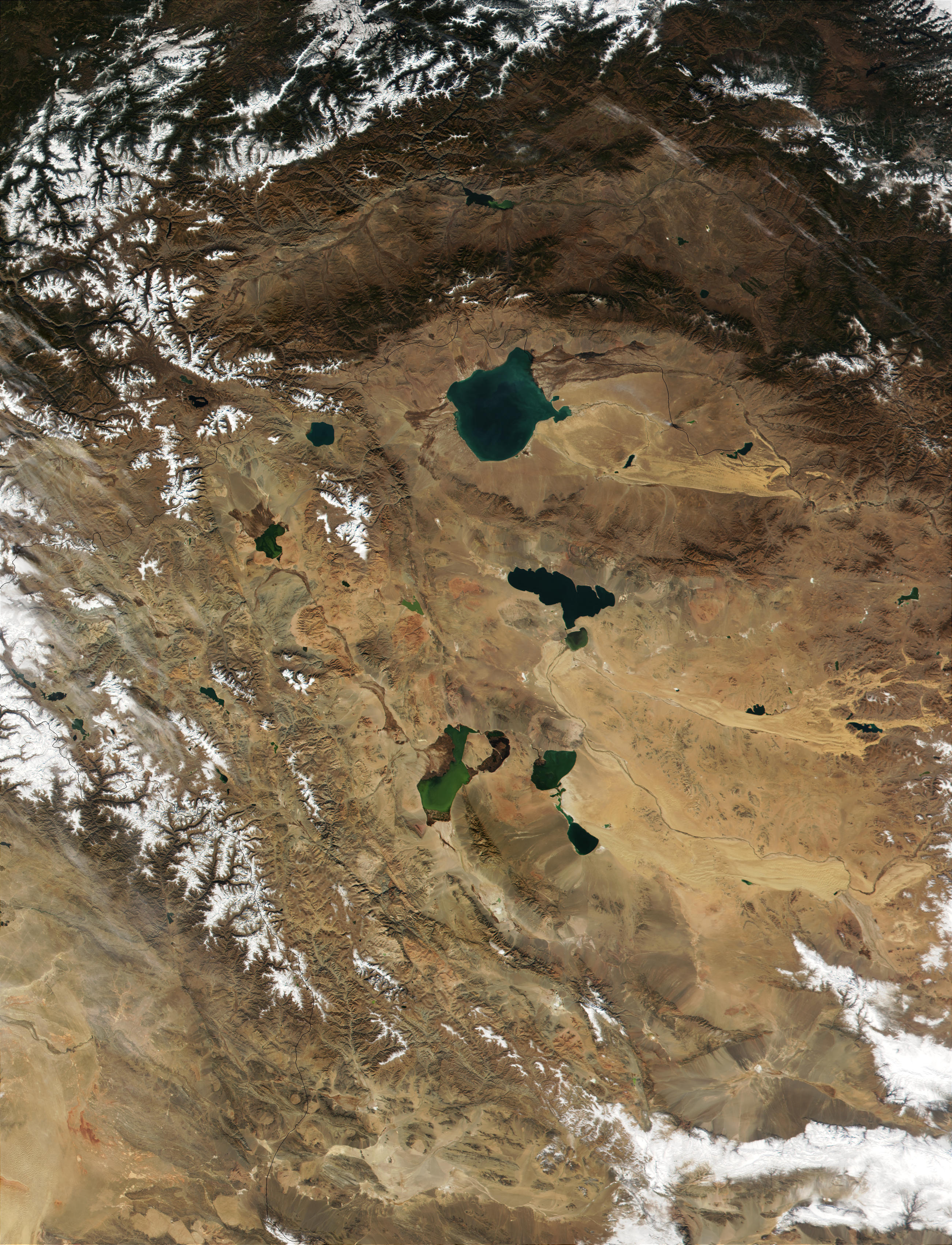
Great Lakes Depression from space. Uvs is the largest lake, just above center

Uvs Lake has a length of 84 km and a width of 79 km, with an average depth of 6 m. Its basin is separated from the rest of the Great Lakes Depression by the Khan Khökhii ridge.

The main feeding rivers are the Baruunturuun, Nariin Gol, and Tes (primary feed of the lake) from Khangai Mountains in the east, and the Kharkhiraa River and Sangil Gol from the Altai Mountains in the west.

== Ecology ==
The very large catchment area with no exit results in highly saline water, primarily due to sulphate and sodium ions. It has a salinity of 18.8 per mille, or 1.88%, making it half as salty as the oceans. The lake freezes over from October to May. In summer, it exhibits a temperature gradient from 25 °C at the surface to 19 °C at the bottom. 29 different species of fish are known from Uvs Lake, and one of them, the Potanini altai osman (Oreoleuciscus potanini), is suitable for human consumption.

== Protected sites ==
The lake and its surroundings have been declared protected sites. The UNESCO is using the designation "Uvs Lake site" as an umbrella term to summarize 12 separate clusters of protected sites, each a representative of a major eastern Eurasian biome.

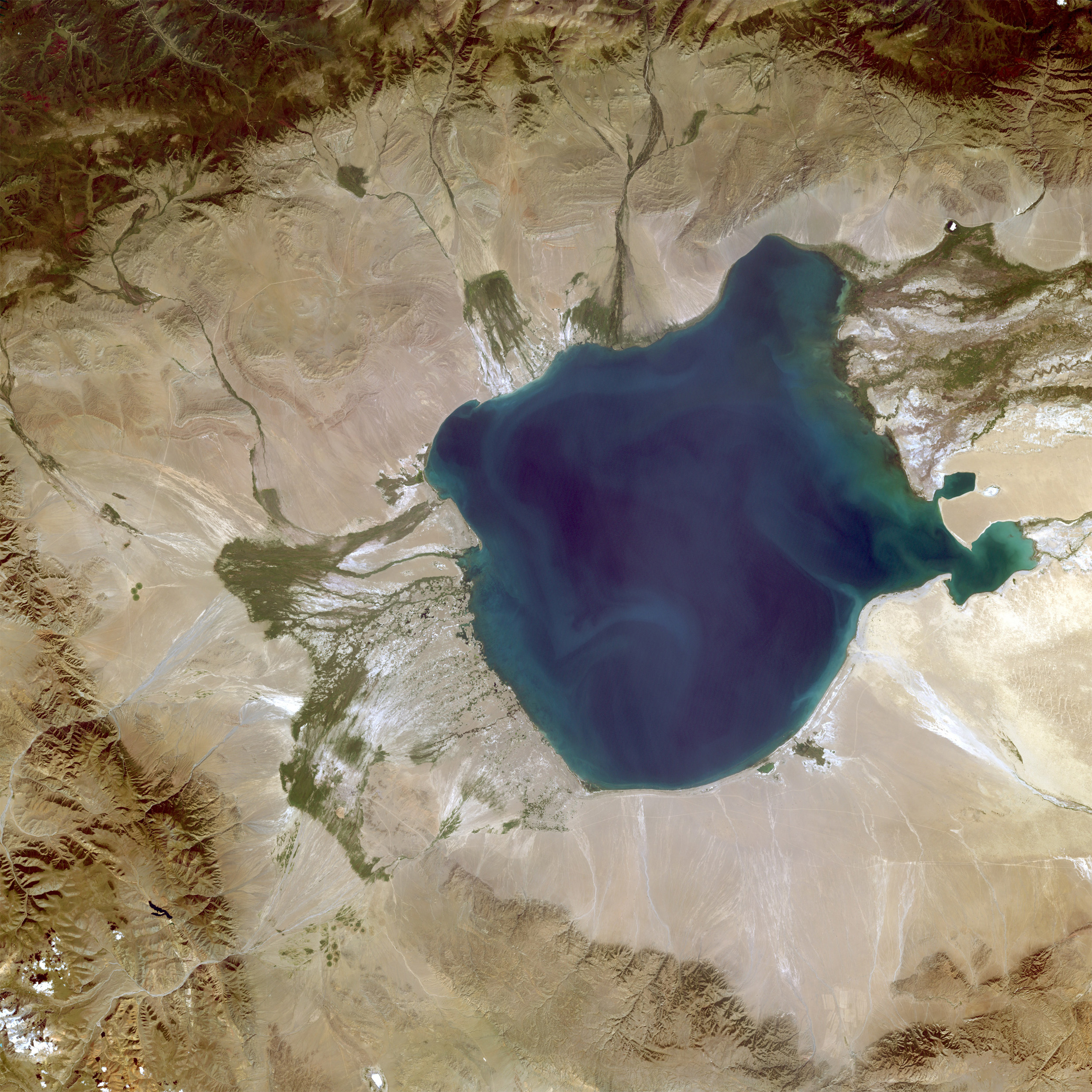
A satellite image of the western part of the Uvs Lake basin

== Basin ==
Uvs Lake is the terminal basin for the Uvs Lake Basin, which covers an area of 70,000 km^{2} and represents one of the best-preserved natural steppe landscapes of Eurasia. The border between Mongolia and Russia runs through the northern periphery of the basin. Here the world's most northern desert meets the world's most southern tundra zone. Apart from Uvs Lake, the basin comprises several smaller lakes. As these lakes lie to the north of other inland seas of Central Asia, they are of key importance for waterfowl migration.

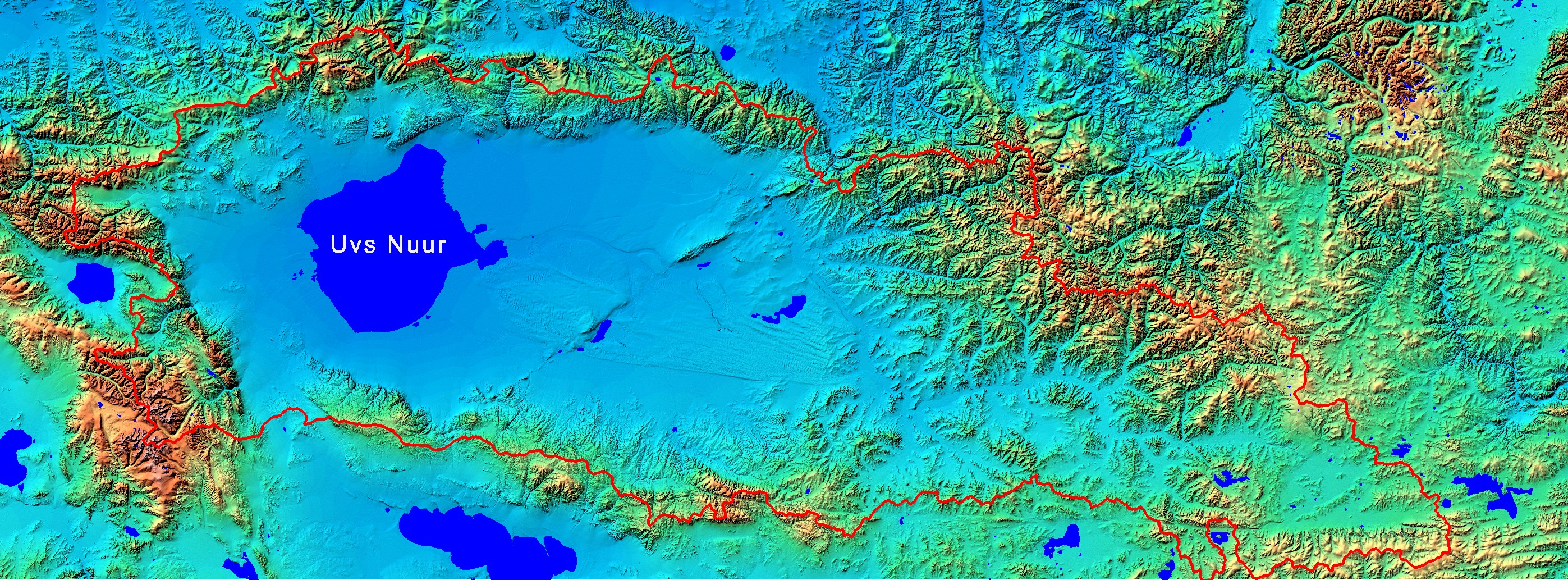
Uvs Lake drainage basin

The basin spans the geoclimatic boundary between Siberia and Central Asia, and lies in a deep frost hollow near the center of the Siberian High, which creates temperature inversions averaging as much as 13 °C or 23.4 °F in midwinter. Consequently, temperatures may vary from −58 °C or −72.4 °F in winter to 47 °C or 116.6 °F in summer. Despite its harsh climate, the depression is home to 173 bird species and 41 mammal species, including the globally endangered snow leopard, argali, and Asiatic ibex.

The population density is low. The lack of industry and the reliance of the inhabitants on traditional ways such as nomadic pasturing have little impact on the landscape and allow the ecosystem to remain relatively pristine. In 2003, the UNESCO listed the Uvs Lake Basin as a natural World Heritage Site. It was nominated as "one of the largest intact watersheds in Central Asia where 40,000 archeological sites can be found from historically famous nomadic tribes such as the Scythians, the Turks and the Huns." This transboundary patrimony is one of the largest sites inscribed in the World Heritage List to date.
