= Üür River =

River in Mongolia

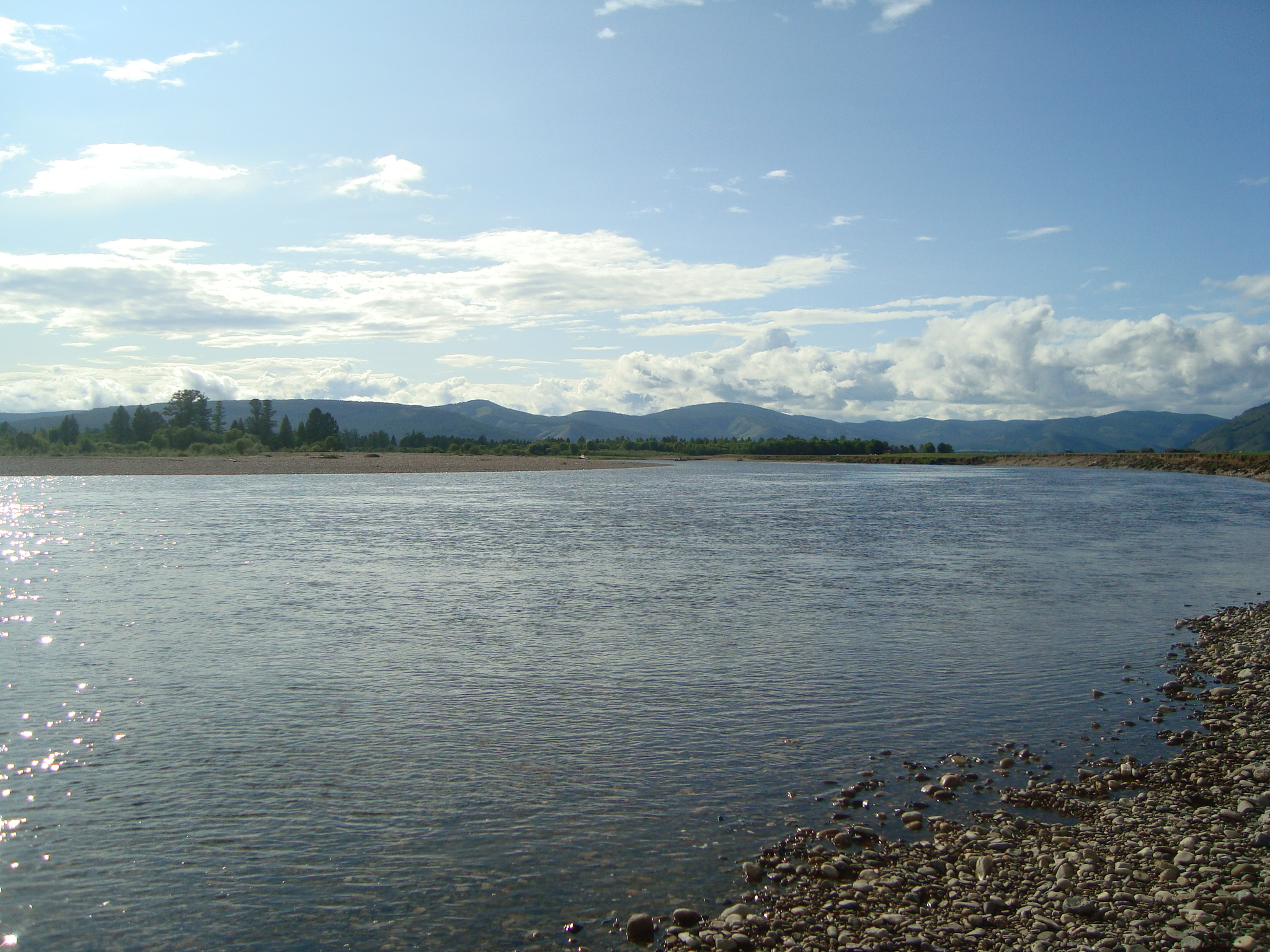
- Native name: Үүрийн гол (Mongolian)

Location
- Country: Mongolia
- Aimags: Khövsgöl

Physical characteristics
- Source
  - location: Tsagaan-Üür sum
  - coordinates: 51°9′5″N 101°35′35″E
- Mouth: Egiin Gol
  - location: Erdenebulgan sum
  - coordinates: 50°18′0″N 101°56′0″E

Basin features
- Progression: Egiin Gol→ Selenga→ Lake Baikal→ Angara→ Yenisey→ Kara Sea
- Tributaries
  - left: Uilgan River
  - right: Arigiin River

The Üür River (Mongolian: Үүрийн гол) is a river in the Khövsgöl aimag of northern Mongolia. It starts in about 30 km from the Russian border in Tsagaan-Üür sum, from the confluence of the Old Üür (Хөгшин Үүр) and the Young Üür (Залуу Үүр). The river is a tributary of the Egiin Gol, which it meets in the Erdenebulgan sum.

== See also ==
- List of rivers of Mongolia
