= Ongi River =

River in west-central Mongolia

Coordinates: 47°00′N 99°00′E

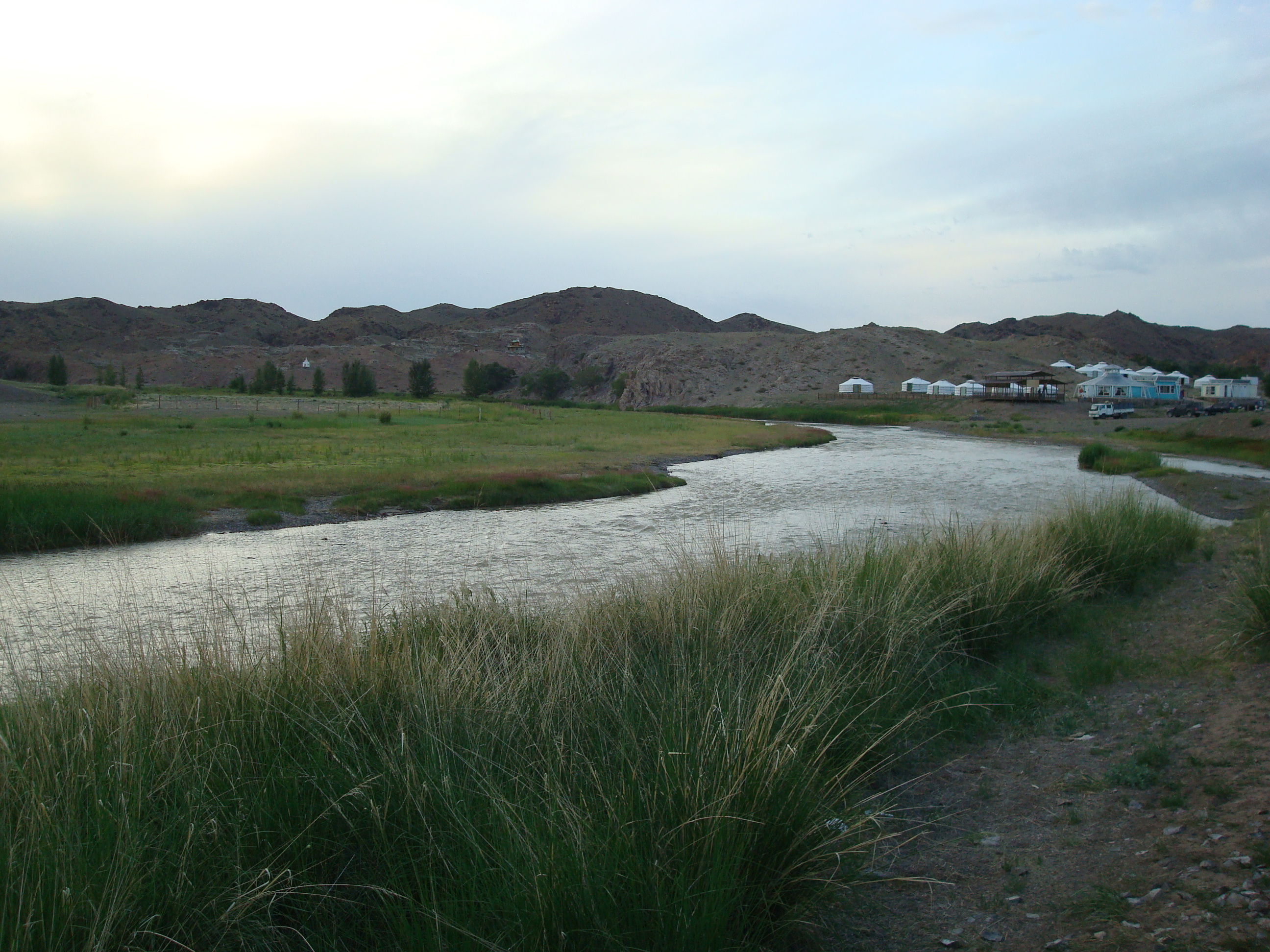
Ongi River

The Ongi River (Mongolian: Онги гол) flows from the southeastern slopes of the Khangai Mountains in Övörkhangai Province for 435 kilometres or 270 miles through the endorheic Ongi River Basin in Mongolia and through the aimag capital Arvaikheer. In some particularly wet years, it used to empty into Ulaan Lake in north central Ömnögovi Province, in most years it dries up earlier.

In recent years it has been additionally threatened by 37 mining operations within the basin, but successful pressure by Tsetsgeegiin Mönkhbayar and the Ongi River Basin Movement helped convince 35 of the operations to cease explorations and harmful activities in the region. The water and groundwater in this area may be contaminated with mercury and cyanide from the mining industry.

== Usage ==
In 2014, around 0.5 million m^{3} of water was withdrawn from the river for domestic, livestock, cropland and industrial use.

== See also ==
- List of rivers of Mongolia
