= Turuun River =

River in Uvs, Mongolia

The Turuun River is a river of western Mongolia. It flows through the sum of Baruunturuun in Uvs Province. The surrounding river valley is considered favorable for farming.
