= Teshig =

District in Bulgan Province, Mongolia

Coordinates: 49°56′49″N 102°39′49″E

Teshig District Тэшиг сум ᠲᠡᠰᠢᠭᠰᠤᠮᠤ
- District
- Interactive map of Teshig District
- Country: Mongolia
- Province: Bulgan Province

Area
  - Total: 7,719 km^{2} (2,980 sq mi)
- Time zone: UTC+8 (UTC + 8)

Teshig (Mongolian: Тэшиг [tʰé̝ɕɪk] = "opening") is a district of Bulgan Province in northern Mongolia. As of the 2009 census, it had a population of 3,514.

== Geography ==
The district has a total area of 7,719 km^{2}.

== Administrative divisions ==
The district is divided into five bags, which are:

- Dalan
- Eren
- Jargalant
- Khargal
- Khujirt
