= Egiin Gol =

River in Mongolia

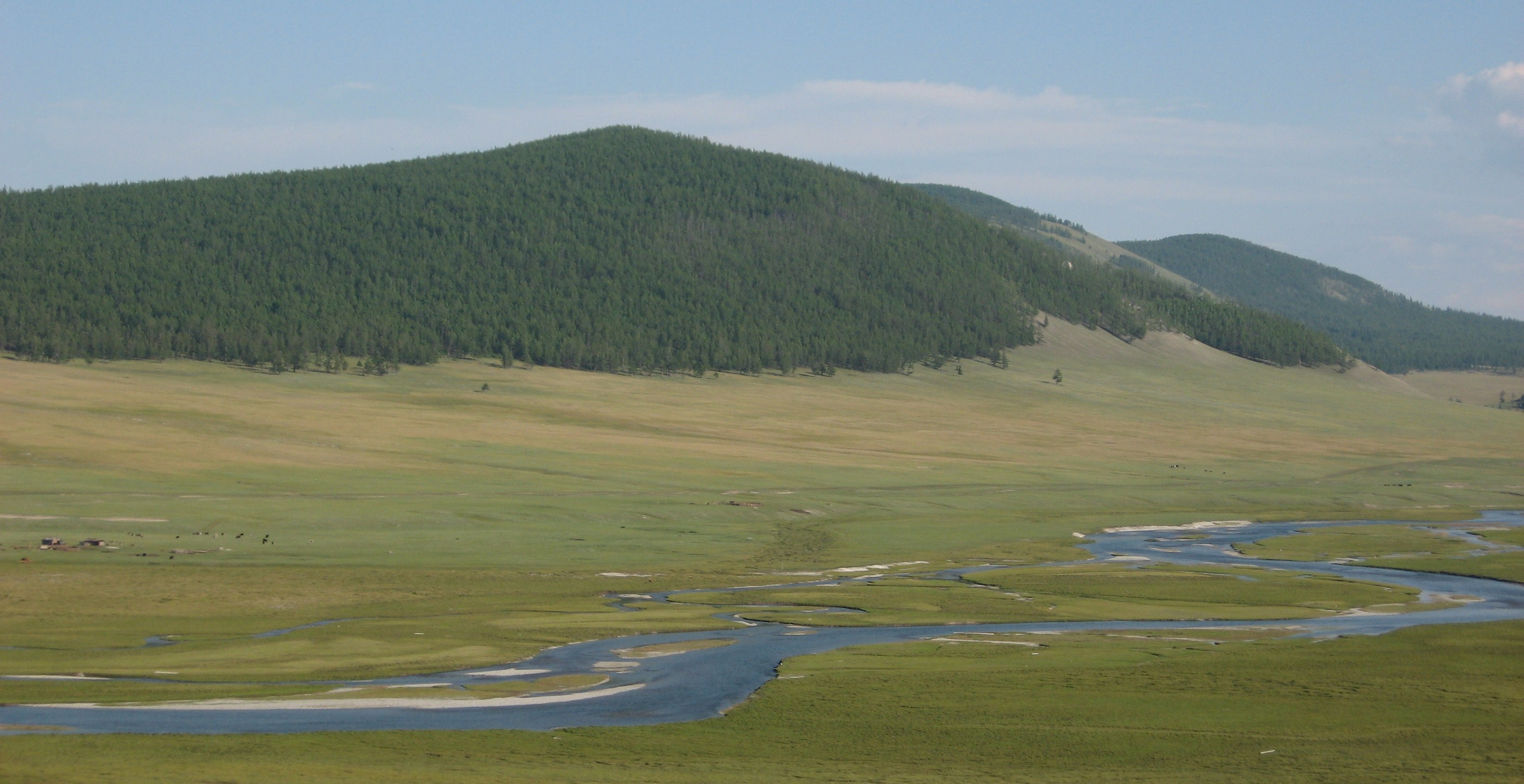
- Egiin Gol some kilometers south of Khatgal
- Native name: Эгийн гол (Mongolian)

Location
- Country: Mongolia
- Aimags: Khövsgöl, Bulgan
- Major city: Khatgal

Physical characteristics
- Source: Lake Khövsgöl
  - location: near Khatgal
  - coordinates: 50°25′10″N 100°09′10″E
  - elevation: 1,645 m (5,397 ft)
- Mouth: Selenga
  - coordinates: 49°23′15″N 103°37′30″E
- Length: 475 km (295 mi)
- Basin size: 49,100 km^{2} (19,000 sq mi)

Basin features
- Progression: Selenga→ Lake Baikal→ Angara→ Yenisey→ Kara Sea
- Tributaries
  - left: Üür River, Tarvagatai River

The Egiin Gol (Mongolian: Эгийн гол) is a river in the Khövsgöl and Bulgan aimags in northern Mongolia. It is the only outflow of Lake Khövsgöl and a left tributary of the Selenge river. It is 475 kilometres (295 mi) long, and has a drainage basin of 49,100 square kilometres (19,000 sq mi). Wooden bridges exist near Khatgal and in Tünel sum, and a concrete bridge has been built in Erdenebulgan. In Bulgan aimag there is a bridge between Teshig and Khutag-Öndör sums.

Since the early 1990s there have been efforts to build a hydroelectric dam on this river. These attempts, however, have been opposed by several academic communities: archaeology because of the rich and not yet fully explored archaeological sites in area; geology because the area may have earthquakes. A dam would also displace parts of the local population as it floods some pastures and homesteads.

== See also ==
- List of rivers of Mongolia
