= Darkhad dialect =

Northern Mongolic dialect of Mongolia

Darkhat
- Darkhad
- Дархад
- Pronunciation: [tár̥χət]
- Native to: Mongolia
- Region: north Mongolia
- Ethnicity: Darkhads
- Native speakers: 24,000 (2016)
- Language family: Mongolic: Central Mongolic; Buryat–Mongolian; Mongolian; Khalkha or Oirat; Darkhat

Language codes
- ISO 639-3: drh (deprecated)
- Glottolog: dark1243
- ELP: Darkhat
- IETF: khk-u-sd-mn041

Darkhad (also "Darkhat") is a dialect in-between Central Mongolian and Oirat still variously seen as closer to Oirat or as a dialect of Khalkha Mongolian with some Oirat features. However, it seems to have substantially assimilated to the Khalkha dialect since it first was described by Sanžeev, and some classificational differences seem to be due to what historical (or even ideal) state got classified. Ethnologue reports a population of 24,000 without providing a date. Speakers live mainly in the west of Lake Khövsgöl in the sums Bayanzürkh, Ulaan-Uul and Rinchinlkhümbe in the Khövsgöl Province of Mongolia.

== Phonology ==
In contrast to Oirat, it has /o/ and /u/ and a diphthongized equivalent of *ai. However, monophthongized reflexes of *ai can be encountered and more so in older language material, so it can be assumed that *ai > ɛː > ɛe due to Khalkha influence. Somewhat similar developments can be observed for other vowels, but as at least /n/ and /l/ can get palatalized, it is problematic whether palatalized consonants or fronted vowels have to be considered as phonemes. It patterns with the Oirat dialects of the Mongolian state in that it retains *ŋn and sometimes has *b > /m/. It doesn't have the Khalkh /ʊ/ and /u/ in non-first syllables, as these merged with /ɔ/ and /o/.

== Verbal system ==
Person inflections as in Oirat or Buryat are getting lost, but used to be present. There are both voluntatives (irrespective of number) in –ja/-ji as in Khalkha and –su for first person singular as in Oirat and Buryat, e.g. /ɡaldat͡ʃixa̯ja̯/ ‘let’s burn it’ and ɔrsu 'I shall enter', but the latter form is rare. The benedictive –kti is actively used as holds for Buryat, e.g. /taː bide̯ nertæ jawd͡ʒi̯ bɛekti/ ‘Please, come with us’. Next to the normal concessive in –g/-k ‘s/he may’, there is also a concessive -/ɡalda̯/ that marks an order to a third person. The other, fairly unremarkable modal verbal suffixes are the imperative, prescriptive, optative and dubitative. The inventory of indicative finite verbal suffixes contains the usual reflexes of Written Mongolian ⟨-nam⟩, ⟨-luγ-a⟩, ⟨-ǰuqui⟩ and ⟨-ba⟩, the last one being rare as usual. There is a fifth suffix, /-t͡ʃɔ/ (possibly from ⟨-ǰu orkiǰuqui⟩), probably expressing some kind of perfect aspect meaning, that is peculiar to Darkhad, e.g. /jawult͡ʃɔ/ ‘has sent’. The participles are the same as in Common Mongolic. However, a thorough analysis of the function of these items in contrast to each other has not been conducted. The converbs are not very particular, but the earliest texts of Darkhad still have a conditional /-wa̯s/ (as in Buryat and Middle Mongolian) next to /-wa̯l/. Furthermore, it used to be possible to negative them with reflexes of ⟨ügei⟩ as in Buryat. Instead of ⟨-maγča⟩ ‘as soon as’, ⟨-nsar⟩ is used.

== Nominal system ==
The case system is the same as in Khalkha, and Oirat plurals like –mud are absent. The pronouns are the same as Khalkha, but a paradigm of the first person plural exclusive without nominative is attested for the old stages of Darkhat (as would hold for Khalkha in the 1930s and still holds for Oirat).
