= Sharga River =

River in Khövsgöl, Mongolia

- Native name: Шарга гол (Mongolian)

Location
- Country: Mongolia
- Aimag: Khövsgöl

Physical characteristics
- Source
  - location: Eastern Sayan Mountains, Tsagaannuur sum
  - coordinates: 51°44′N 99°31′E
- Mouth
  - location: Dood Tsagaan Lake, Renchinlkhümbe sum
  - coordinates: 51°22′N 99°26′E

Basin features
- Progression: Little Yenisey→ Yenisey→ Kara Sea

Sharga River (Mongolian: Шарга гол) is a river in Khövsgöl aimag of northern Mongolia. It runs through the eastern part of "East Taiga", the north eastern extension of the Darkhad valley. The river starts as a confluence of several smaller rivers in the Tsagaannuur sum near the Russian border and exits into Dood Tsagaan Lake in the Renchinlkhümbe sum as a tributary of the Little Yenisey (Shishged Gol).

== See also ==
- List of rivers of Mongolia
