= Ulaan Taiga =

Mountain range in Khövsgöl, Mongolia

Coordinates: 50°45′N 98°30′E

Naming
- Native name: Улаан Тайга (Mongolian)

Geography
- Location: Northwestern Khövsgol, Mongolia
- Parent range: Mountain range in Khövsgöl

The Ulaan Taiga (Mongolian: Улаан Тайга [ʊɮáɴ tʰɛ̂(ː)q]; lit. 'Red Taiga') is a mountain range in north-western Khövsgöl, Mongolia, between the Darkhad Valley and Mongolia's border with Tuva, Russia. The range covers parts of the Ulaan-Uul, Tsagaannuur and Bayanzürkh sums. Notable peaks include Mt. Lam Taiga (2619m) and Mt. Belchir (3351m). The Shishged River and the Delger mörön have their sources in this area. A part of the area along the border with Tuva has been put under natural protection.
