= Busiyn-Gol =

River in Mongolia and Russia

- Native name: Бусийн-Гол (Russian)

Location
- Country: Mongolia, Russia
- Aimag/Republic: Khövsgöl, Tuva

Physical characteristics
- Source
  - location: southern Ulaan Taiga, Ulaan-Uul, Khövsgöl, Mongolia
  - coordinates: 50°48′50″N 98°33′10″E
- Mouth: Little Yenisey
  - location: Tuva, Russia
  - coordinates: 51.4669°N 98.0413°E
- Length: 125 km (78 mi)

Basin features
- Progression: Little Yenisey→ Yenisey→ Kara Sea

The Busiyn-Gol (Russian: Бусийн-Гол or Бусэйн-Гол Buseyn-Gol) is a river in northern Mongolia and Tuva. It has its source in the southern Ulaan Taiga mountain range, meets the Russian border after about 50 km, and then follows the border north until its confluence with the Little Yenisey (Kyzyl-Khem). It is 129 kilometres (80 mi) long, and has a drainage basin of 2,380 square kilometres (920 sq mi).

== See also ==
- List of rivers of Mongolia
