= Darkhad (disambiguation) =

Darkhad is a Mongolian term for workmen and Untouchables.

Darkhad may also refer to:

- Darkhad Valley, Mongolia
- Darkhat, a subgroup of Mongol people living mainly in Mongolia
- Shar Darkhad, a subgroup of Mongol people living mainly in Inner Mongolia in northern China
