= Dood Tsagaan Lake =

Lake in Khövsgöl Province, Mongolia

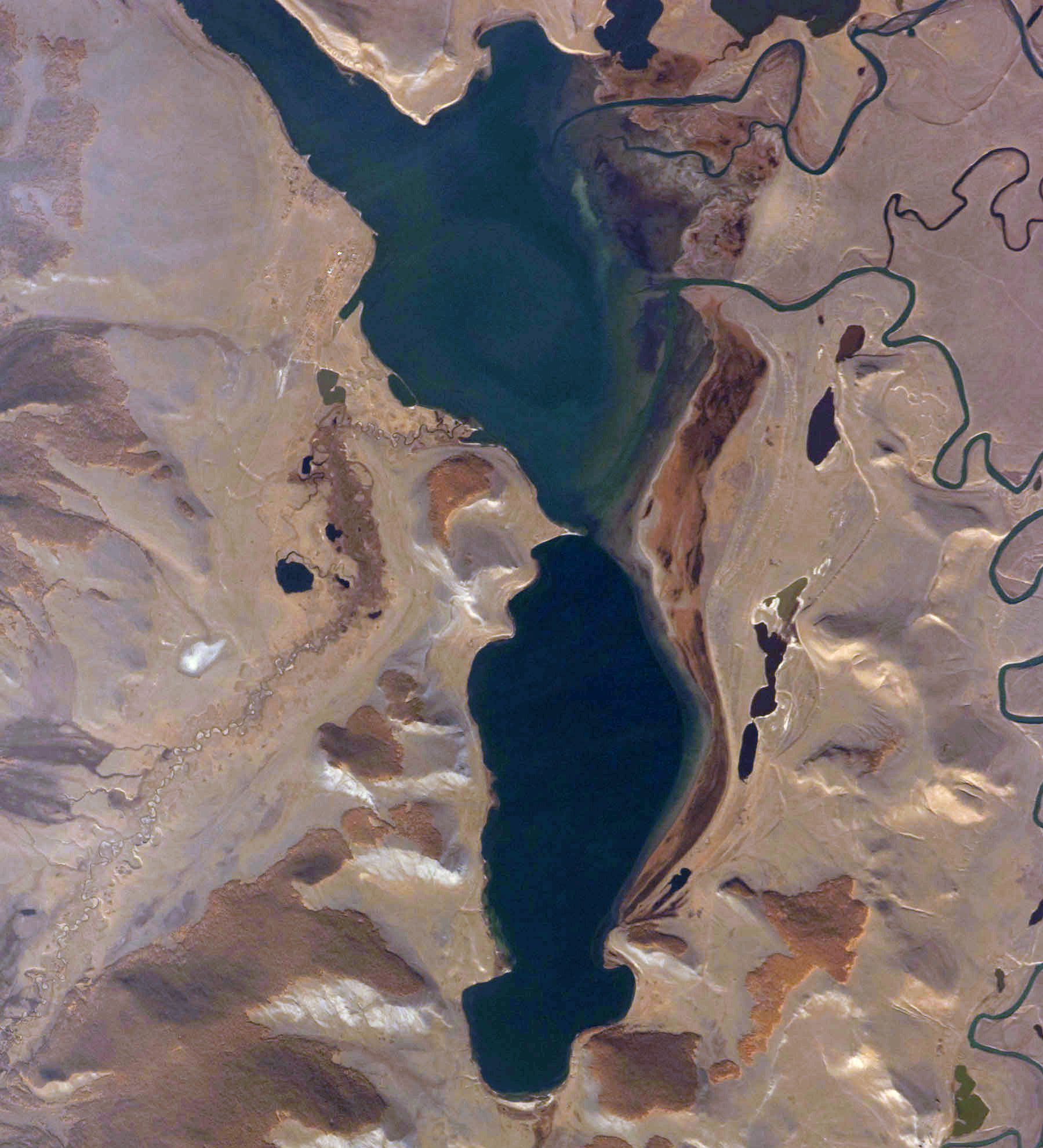
- View of lake taken during ISS Expedition 20

- Location within Mongolia
- Location: Darkhad Valley
- Coordinates: 51°19′N 99°23′E
- Primary inflows: Shishged Gol, Khogorog gol, Sharga River, Kharmai gol, Arsain gol
- Primary outflows: Shishged Gol
- Basin countries: Mongolia
- Max. length: 18 km (11 mi)
- Max. width: 7 km (4.3 mi)
- Surface area: 64 km^{2} (25 sq mi)
- Max. depth: 15 m (49 ft)
- Surface elevation: 1,600 m (5,200 ft)
- Settlements: Tsagaannuur

Dood Tsagaan Lake (Mongolian: Доод Цагаан нуур; lit. 'Lower White Lake') is a lake in northwestern Khövsgöl aimag, Mongolia, between the sums of Tsagaannuur and Renchinlkhümbe. It's sometimes divided into the Targan, Dund, and Kharmai lakes. Targan lake is 3.5 meters deep, Dund nuur 5 meters and Kharmai nuur 15 meters.

Tsagaannuur's administrative center is located on the western shore of the lake.
