= Darkhad =

Mongol ethnic group in Darkhad Valley of Mongolia

Darkhad
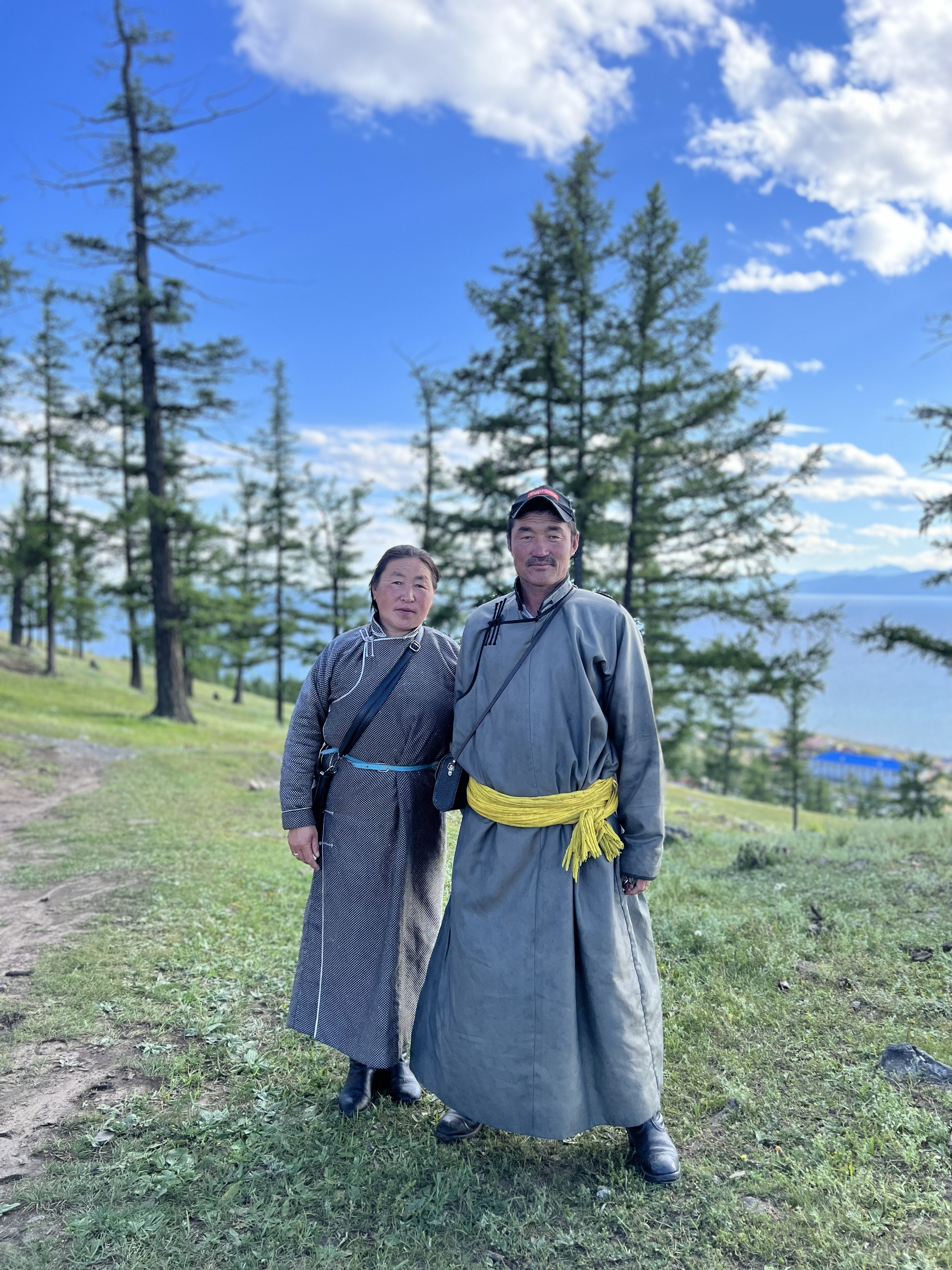
- Darkhat people

Total population
- 21,558

Regions with significant populations
- Mongolia: 21,558

Languages
- Darkhad dialect of Mongolian

Religion
- Mongolian shamanism, Tibetan Buddhism

Related ethnic groups
- Khotgoid, Oirats, Khalkha Mongols, Siberian Turkic People, and Samoyedic people

The Darkhad (Mongolian: Дархад [tár̥χət]) are a subgroup of the Mongols living mainly in northern Mongolia; particularly in the Bayanzürkh, Ulaan-Uul, Renchinlkhümbe, Tsagaannuur Districts of Khövsgöl Province. They speak a regional variant of Mongolian known as the Darkhad dialect. As of the 2000 census, 16,268 people identified themselves as Darkhad.

The Darkhad were originally part of the Oirat Mongols or Khotgoid branch of the Khalkha Mongols. Between 1549 and 1686, they were subjects of Zasagt Khanate of Khalkha Mongols and the Khotgoid Altan Khanate of Khalkha Mongols. In 1786 they became part of the Jebtsundamba Khutuktu's shabi otog. At roughly the same time they became known as Black Darkhad.

Many Darkhad practise Mongolian shamanism.

The Darkhad valley is named after them.

== History ==
In 555 AD, the 3rd Khan of the Göktürks Kigin conquered the tribes of the Sayan Mountains. The Mongolian, Turkic, and Samoyedic tribes living in the taiga of southern Siberia were collectively referred to as "Forest People" Among these forest tribes, some lived in yurts, hunted in the taiga, and herded reindeer, while more powerful tribes raised livestock, including the Oirat Mongols.

In 1207, Genghis Khan's son, Jochi, conquered the forest people. As a result, the Oirat Mongols became a major force and, by the late 14th and early 15th centuries, migrated from the vicinity of the Sayan Mountains to the Altai Mountains. By the late 16th century, war broke out between the Oirat Mongols and the Khalkha Mongols. Galdan Boshugtu Khan of Dzungar Khanate of the Oirat Mongols conquered the Tuvans, Uriankhai, Khotgoid, and Darkhad Valley regions which were part of Khotogoid Altan Khanate but was defeated by the Manchu army. After this, the Oirat Mongols came under the influence of Büveyn, son of Genden, and moved to the Kharaa and Yeruu regions, becoming disciples of the Mongol religious leader Zanabazar. Eventually, they returned to the Darkhad Valley, where they led a nomadic life, moving 200–300 km annually between summer pastures near the Shishged River and wintering areas in Bayan-Zurkh, Agar, Beltes, and Altraga.

During the reign of Kublai Khan, the guardians of Genghis Khan's Eight White Gers in Ordos, known as the Shar Darkhad, are not related to the Darkhad of Khövsgöl.

== Clans ==
=== Khar Darkhad ===
The Khar Darkhad who form the Majority of the Darkhad people, were originally subjects of Genden Sain Khuntaij's brother, Lord Geleg, under the rule of the Zasagt Khan. These people were relocated by decree to the Haraa and Yeruu regions and became disciples (shavi) of Zanabazar, the Undur Gegeen. Longing for their homeland, they petitioned Zanabazar for permission to return to the Shishged region. He granted their request, declaring them as his "exempted disciples" (darhads), thus giving rise to the name Darkhad. This group is now recognized as the Khar Darkhad. However, not just Tofalars and Mongols include the current Khar Darkhad may also include members from the Khamnigan clans.

=== Ukhaa Darkhad ===
Ukhaa Darkhad are subgroup of the Darkhad people. descendants of the Samoyeds, an ethnic group that lived in the Soyon Mountains and paid tribute to Russia. The name is historically tied to their settlement in what is now Khankh and Renchinlkhümbe sums of Khövsgöl Province. Two rivers in these areas are named "Ukhaa," reflecting the fact that the "Ukhaa Darkhad" once inhabited these regions.

=== Sharnuud Darkhad ===
The Sharanuud Darkhad are descentends of ancient Mongols, who split off from the Tümed, Barga, and Sönid tribes during the 12th century. When Jochi Khan conquered the forest peoples, many Mongolian tribes were living in the Darkhad Valley, including the Sharanuud clan. The Sharanuud of the Darkhad trace their lineage to these tribes and venerate their ancestral spirits, represented by the banners of Tsagaadai and Tsankhilkhan.

=== Khuular Darkhad ===
Khuular clan of the Darkhad people is divided into four subgroups named after colors: Khar, Tsagaan, Ulaan, and Nogoon. The reason for this differentiation lies in the rule prohibiting marriage within the same color group. The Khuular clan is not exclusive to the Darkhad, it is also found in Tuvans and the Altaians and its clan Turkic origin. Members of the Khuular clan first settled in the Darkhad Valley during the Gokturks conquests in Mongolia and have since remained in areas like the Shishged and Tengis regions of what is now Renchinlkhümbe sum.

=== Erkhid Darkhad ===
The Erkhit clan of the Darkhad is of Samoyedic origin and is believed to descend from the people who lived in the Irkutsk region. Members of this group migrated to the Darkhad area during the 17th and 18th centuries. It is said that the city of Irkutsk was named after the Erkhit clan, reflecting their historical presence in the region.

=== Balagch Darkhad ===
The Balagch clan of the Darkhadi also widespread Tozhu and Tsaatan. The clan traces its origins to the Gokturks, Medieval Uyghurs, and Khirgis tribes who lived in the Tannu and Sayan Mountain regions. These tribes often named people or clans based on their livelihood and activities, such as hunting, fishing. The name "Balagch," which translates to "fisherman" reflects this tradition and indicates the clan's association with fishing as a primary activity.

=== Khorlomai Darkhad ===
The Khorlomai clan of the Darkhad is said to have originated from the "Khorlomai War." The name derives from the term "khorlogchid," meaning raiders or plunderers. According to legend, the Khorlomai were a group of marauders defeated by the Darkhad shaman Noyon Böö near the Tengis River.The story tells of the Khorlomai people, who had never been defeated in battle, encountering Noyon Böö and attempting to kill him using weapons and fire. However, their efforts were unsuccessful. They then decided to take Noyon Böö with them to war. He instructed each warrior to build a raft and float downstream, promising to follow them later. Noyon Böö stayed behind with a pregnant woman, and all the others perished as they floated away. Only the pregnant woman survived, with her son, the Khorlomai clan is said to have descended from that son. The Khorlomai are believed to be descendants of Tozhu Tuvans people who once lived along the Khem River in Tuva

=== Oynod Darkhad ===
The Oynod clan of the Darkhad traces its lineage to the forest people who lived in the Tannu-Sayan Mountains and the Shishged River basin during the 12th–13th centuries. These people are believed to be descendants of the Oirats who remained in the area instead of migrating. Over time, they assimilated with the Darkhad ethnic group, and many began identifying themselves as part of the "Black Darkhad."

=== Uuld Darkhad ===
The Ööld clan of the Darkhad predominantly resides in the Ulaan-Uul and Bayan-Zurkh sum. They are descendants of those who settled in the area during the Ööld Wars. Battles involving the Ööld occurred in the Shishged region of Renchinlkhümbe, and after Galdan Boshigt Khan's defeat, Ööld families were relocated to the Darkhad territory.

An interesting fact is the existence of a small clan known as the Bööguud ("Shamans") in Dörvön soum of Khovd Province in Mongolia. They claim descent from a shaman ancestor and say their roots trace back to Khövsgöl Province, adding to the rich cultural connections of the Darkhad.

=== Iljgen Darkhad ===
The Iljgen were part of the Uriankhai and were known as the "Iljgen Arvan" (Iljgen Ten). They were under the authority of Düüregch Van and paid a fur tax as tribute. Most members of this clan were involved in dual livelihoods, raising reindeer and engaging in other subsistence activities. They primarily resided in areas such as Khög and Gun rivers of Ulaan-Uul. Interestingly, remnants of the fortress attributed to the "Iljgen Chiht Khan's" can still be found in Guchin Us of Övörkhangai Province and Khovd sums of Khovd Province.

=== Soyon Darkhad ===
The Soyon clan of the Darkhad is divided into two subgroups: Soyon and Khar Soyon ("Black Soyon"). The term "Soyon" is believed to derive from the Mongolian word "shirkh," meaning Insects that come out of dead manure and enter the animal's body suggesting that the clan originally lived in areas with shirkh ancient times This clan is widespread among both the Darkhad and the Tsaatan. Its lineage traces back to the ancient Samoyeds

=== Zoot Darkhad ===
The Zoot clan of the Darkhad originated as part of the forest Uriankhai tribes and later assimilated into the Darkhad ethnicity, becoming one of its recognized clans. Today, the Zoot clan predominantly resides in the Ulaan-Uul region and surrounding areas, continuing to be an integral part of the Darkhad people.

=== Khaasuud Darkhad ===
The Khaasuud clan of the Darkhad traces its roots to people who historically inhabited the regions around the Shishged and Yenisei Rivers.

=== Uyghur and Khirgis ===
The Uyghur and Khirgis clans of the Darkhad trace their lineage back to the Uyghur and Khirgis tribes who controlled the Tannu-Sayan Mountain region during the 8th–10th centuries.

=== Maanjrag Darkhad ===
The Maanjrag clan of the Darkhad originates from the Tunkin Alar Buryats. This clan represents people who separated from the Buryats and later integrated into the Darkhad community.In the shamanic chants of the Khori Buryats, an ancestral spirit named Manjilkha is frequently mentioned.

=== Khariad Darkhad ===
The Khariad clan originates from the Buryatia having migrated from there. However, the Khariad is not considered part of the Darkhad rather, they are classified as Khalkha.

=== Mankhialag Darkhad ===
The Mankhilag clan of the Darkhad is recorded in historical accounts, but its exact origins and lineage remain unclear.

=== Urad Darkhad ===
The Urad clan of the Darkhad traces its origins to the Uruud tribe, which inhabited the regions around the Onon and Kherlen Rivers during the 12th century. This clan is traditionally believed to descend from the lineage of Khavt Khasar, a younger brother of Genghis Khan, linking them to a significant historical and noble ancestry.

=== Onkhod Darkhad ===
The Onkhod clan of the Darkhad originates from the ancient Ongud tribe, who migrated to the Baikal region during the Mongol conquests. They were known to live by trading fur and paying tribute in the form of pelts to Russia.

=== Chonod and Sönöd ===
The Chonod and Sönöd clans of the Darkhad trace their roots to the Taichiud and Khongirad tribes, who also settled in the region during the Mongol conquest.

== See also ==
- Darkhad language
- Taiga (1992 film)
