= Ikh Uul =

Ikh Uul (Mongolian: Их Уул) may refer to:

- Ikh-Uul, Zavkhan, a sum in western Mongolia
- Ikh-Uul, Khövsgöl, a sum in northern Mongolia
- Ikh Uul (Khövsgöl Nuur), a peak in the Khoridol Saridag mountains
