= Tengiz =

Tengiz, Teniz (Kazakh: Теңіз; Russian: Тениз), or Tengis is a Turco-Mongol word meaning sea.

It may refer to:

- Tengiz Lake, a lake in Akmola Region, Kazakhstan
- Tengizi Islands, an island chain sited within Lake Tengiz
- Tengiz Field, an oil field in Atyrau Region, Kazakhstan
- Teniz, Kamysty District, a lake in Kostanay Region, Kazakhstan
- Teniz, Mendykara District, a lake in Kostanay Region, Kazakhstan
- Teniz, Yereymentau District, a lake in Akmola Region, Kazakhstan
- Tengis River, a river in Mongolia
- Tengiz (given name), a Georgian given name

== See also ==
- Tenis
