= Gatikoyev =

Gatikoyev is a surname. Notable people with the surname include:

- David Gatikoyev (born 1993), Russian footballer
- Tengiz Gatikoyev (born 1970), Russian footballer
