= Tengiz (given name) =

Tengiz (Georgian: თენგიზ) is a Georgian masculine given name, meaning "sea" or "ocean". The name is derived from a Turkic word (Proto-Turkic teŋiz), which denotes a large body of water such as a sea or ocean. Notable people with the given name include:

- Tengiz Abuladze (1924–1994), Georgian film director, screenwriter and teacher
- Tengiz Amirejibi (1927–2013), Georgian pianist
- Tengiz Beridze (1939–2024), Georgian biochemist
- Tengiz Gatikoyev (born 1970), Russian footballer
- Tengiz Gudava (1953–2009), Georgian author and human rights activist
- Tengiz Iremadze (born 1973), Georgian philosopher
- Tengiz Khubuluri (born 1955), Georgian judoka
- Tengiz Kitovani (1938–2023), Georgian politician and military commander
- Tengiz Meskhadze (born 1969), Georgian boxer
- Tengiz Peranidze (born 1998), Georgian rugby union player
- Tengiz Sichinava (1972–2021), Georgian football player and manager
- Tengiz Sigua (1934–2020), Georgian politician
- Tengiz Sulakvelidze (born 1956), Georgian footballer
- Tengiz Tarba (born 1979), Russian footballer
- Tengiz Tsikaridze (born 1995), Georgian footballer
- Tengiz Ugrekhelidze (born 1981), Georgian footballer
- Tengiz Zamtaradze (born 1998), Georgian rugby union player
- Tengiz Zhghenti (1887–1937), Georgian politician

== See also ==
- Tengiz (disambiguation)
- Tengiz Burjanadze Stadium, a multi-use stadium in Gori, Georgia
