= Tengis River =

River in Mongolia

- Native name: Тэнгис гол (Mongolian)

Location
- Country: Mongolia
- Aimag: Khövsgöl
- Region: Tsagaannuur sum

Physical characteristics
- Source
  - location: Eastern Sayan Mountains
  - coordinates: 52°5′N 98°55′E
- Mouth: Little Yenisey
  - coordinates: 51°29′N 99°3′E

Basin features
- Progression: Little Yenisey→ Yenisey→ Kara Sea

Tengis River (Mongolian: Тэнгис гол) is a river in the Tsagaannuur sum of Khövsgöl aimag in northern Mongolia. It runs through the western part of "East Taiga", the northern extension of the Darkhad valley. The river starts near the Russian border, in the northernmost tip of Mongolia. It ends as a right-hand tributary of the Little Yenisey (Shishged Gol).

== See also ==
- List of rivers of Mongolia
