= Khoridol Saridag mountains =

Mountain range in Mongolia

Coordinates: 50.6894°N 99.7922°E

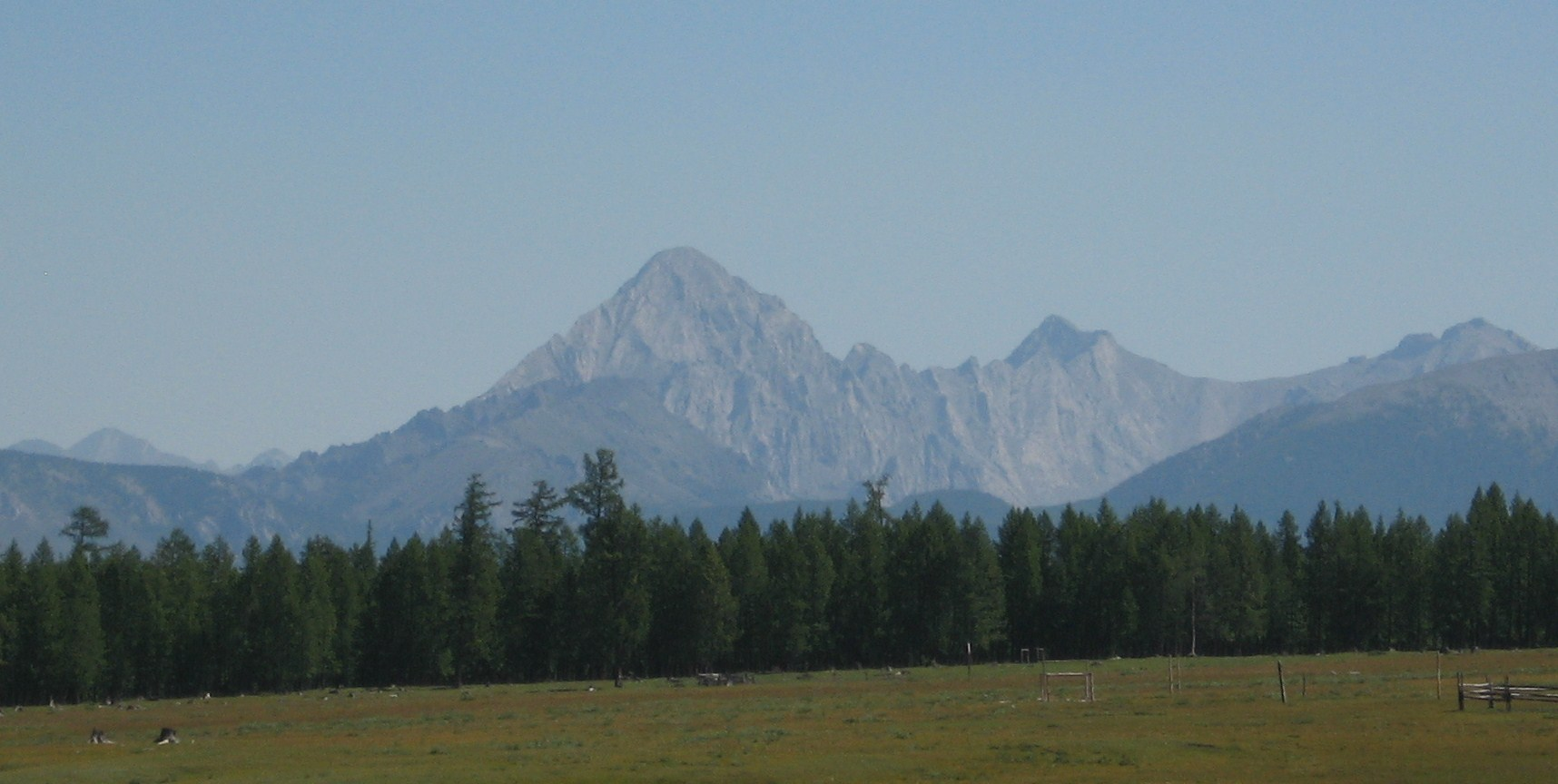
Delgerkhaan (3093m), the highest peak of the range

The Khoridol Saridag mountains (Mongolian: Хорьдол Сарьдагийн нуруу, Khoridol Saridagiin nuruu) are a 150 km-long mountain range in Khövsgöl aimag, Mongolia, between Khövsgöl nuur and the Darkhad valley. The range covers parts of the Renchinlkhümbe, Ulaan-Uul and Alag-Erdene sums. The highest peak is Delgerkhaan Uul (3093m), two other notable peaks are Ikh Uul (2961m) and Uran Dösh Uul (2702m) on the shores of Khövsgöl nuur.

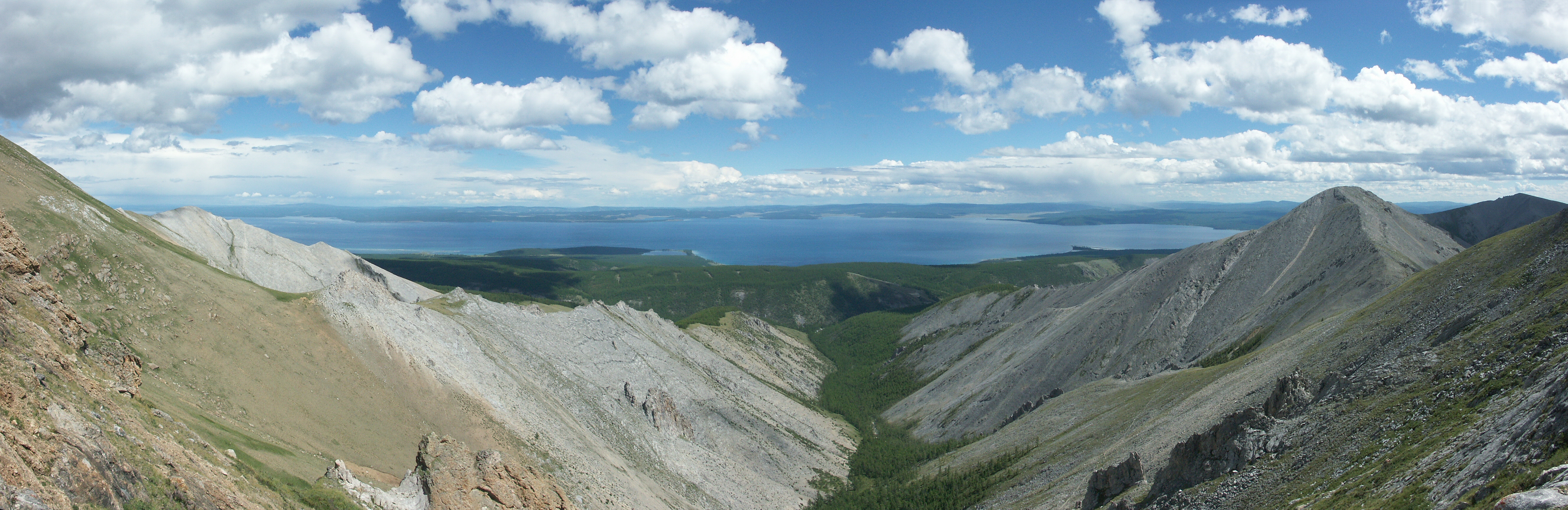
view from the mountains at Khövsgöl nuur

The mountains along the lake are rich in phosphorite, and in the 1980s extensive exploration work was done for open-pit mining. Roads built during that time and other remains, are still visible all over the area. However, due to the political and economic changes of the early 1990s in Mongolia and Russia, those projects were cancelled. In 1997, a protected area covering 1886 km^{2} was founded.
