= Dukha people =

Community of reindeer herders living in northern Mongolia

Dukhans Духан / Цаатан
tuʰha ulǝs
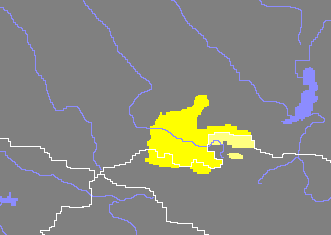
- Today's settlement areas of the Tyva (bright yellow) in Russia and the Dukha (pale yellow) in neighbouring Mongolia.

Total population
- 208 (2020)

Regions with significant populations
- Mongolia

Languages
- Dukhan, Mongolian

Religion
- Tengrism • Shamanism • Animism

Related ethnic groups
- Tuvans, Tofalar, Soyots, several other Turkic peoples

The Dukha, Duha, Dukhans or Duhalar (Mongolian: Цаатан, Tsaatan, духа́, Dukha) are a small Turkic community of semi-nomadic reindeer herders living in a sum of Khövsgöl Province, Mongolia called Tsagaannuur. The Dukha are divided into two major territorial groups: East Taiga (whose members for the most part trace their ancestry to reindeer herders whose territory spanned from northeast Tuva to the area north of Lake Hövsgöl); and West Taiga (whose members for the most part trace their ancestry to reindeer herders whose territory spanned from southeast Tuva to the area of Ulaan Taiga in present-day Mongolia). They are the only reindeer herders in Mongolia, and their ancestors are considered some of the earliest domesticators of any animal.

The Tsaatan, whose name means ‘those who have reindeer’ in the Mongolian language, were originally Tuvinian reindeer herders.

== Language ==
The Dukhan language (SIL International rejected code dkh) is an endangered Turkic variety spoken by approximately five hundred people in the Tsagaan-Nuur county of the Khövsgöl region of northern Mongolia. Dukhan belongs to the Taiga subgroup of Sayan Turkic (Tuvan, Tofa).

Today, many Dukha are fluent in both the Dukhan language and Mongolian. Many youth are educated in Mongolia and are well-versed in Mongolian as a result.

== Genetics ==
Y-DNA haplogroup N1a1-F4205 (N3a5a) makes up 52%, haplogroup Q-M25 — 43,5 %, haplogroup C3c1b-F6379 — 4,3 %.

== History ==
Historical population in Mongolia
Year	Pop.	±%
2000	303	—
2010	282	−6.9%
2020	208	−26.2%
Source: National Statistical Office of Mongolia

The Tuvans are descended from a clan called the Kazylgans, who lived in modern day Tuva from the 7th to the 3rd century BC. Pastoral Hun tribes then replaced them in the 2nd century BC and continued to populate the region until the 1st century AD. These tribes are believed to have spoken Kettic and Samoyedic languages.

From 551 to 744 AD, Turkic tribes brought on by the Turkic reign began intermixing with the natives. Additionally, the Dubo people settled in the Eastern Sayan region in the 7th century. Following that, the Uigurs overtook the Second Turkic khaganate and became the ancestors of four modern day ethnic Tuvan groups, one of them being the Dukha people.

Originally from across the border in what is now Tuva Republic of Russia, the Dukha settled in northern Mongolia. Tuva became independent in 1921, when Mongolia gained its independence from China. The reindeer herders were able to cross the border freely between Tuva and Mongolia until 1944, when Tuva was annexed to the Soviet Union and the border was closed. Many Dukha, who had settled in Mongolia due to fear of Soviet collectivization of their reindeer, food shortages from World War II, and intertribal relations, were separated from their family in Tuva as a result. Under Soviet influenced Mongolian socialism, the Dukhan way of life suffered significantly, particularly reindeer herding after it became collectivized and state run. The Tuvan language also began to be replaced by Mongolian. In 1956 the government finally gave the Dukha Mongolian citizenship and resettled them at Tsagaan Nuur Lake on the Shishigt River. The economic revolution of the 1990s, which marked a change from socialism to privatization, saw the transition of many Dukha back to reindeer herding after years of taking urban jobs. The lack of government subsidization for herding led to difficulty in maintaining herds, but the advent of tourism in the mid-1990s began to support herders financially.

The Dukha started becoming distinguished as reindeer herders around 1935, when the Mongolian word "tsaatan" first appeared in the newspaper Ünen and began to replace terms such as soyot uriankhai, taigyn irged (English: "citizens of the taiga), and oin irged (English: "citizens of the forest"). The Dukhas' chosen name for themselves, however, remains uncertain.

== Culture ==
The Dukha are one of the few remaining groups of nomadic (or semi-nomadic) reindeer herders in the world. As of 2000, 30-32 households (about 180 people) remain in Tsagaanuur with their reindeer. The nomadic and settled Dukha populations total to about 500 people.

=== Clan relations ===
The Dukha people frequently marry into other ethnic groups in the region, such as the Bargash, Soyan, or Orat. These clans are called jono, each of which has sub-clans within it. Interclan relations are strictly for the purpose of exogamy.

The Dukha clan itself consists of residential groups in which families live near each other in tents. This can include parents, children, extended family, and friendships. A residential group that is composed of many families is called olal-lal in the Tuva language. Each has a representative member by which the group is referred to.

=== Reindeer use and management ===
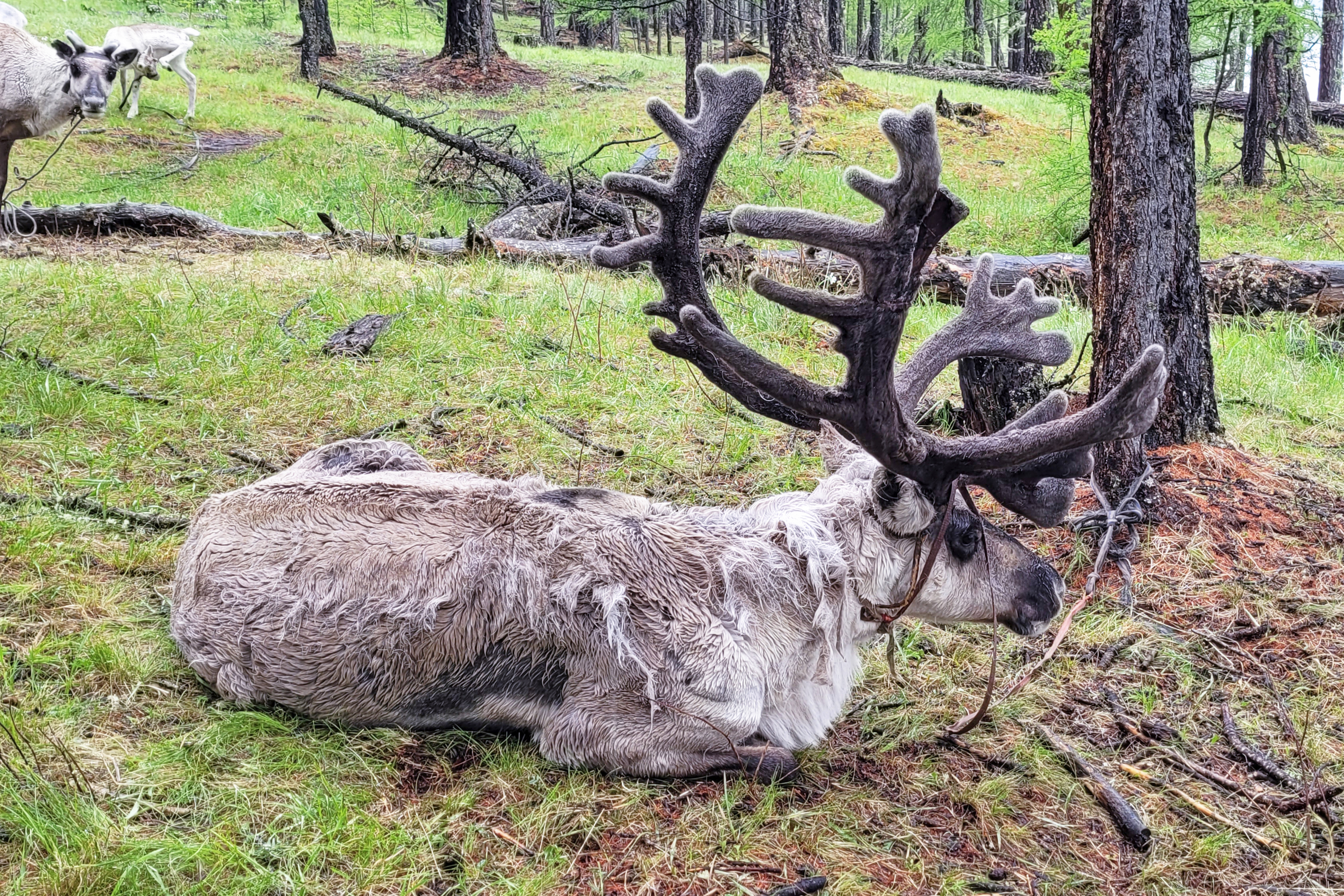
Reindeer domesticated by Dukha people in Mongolia

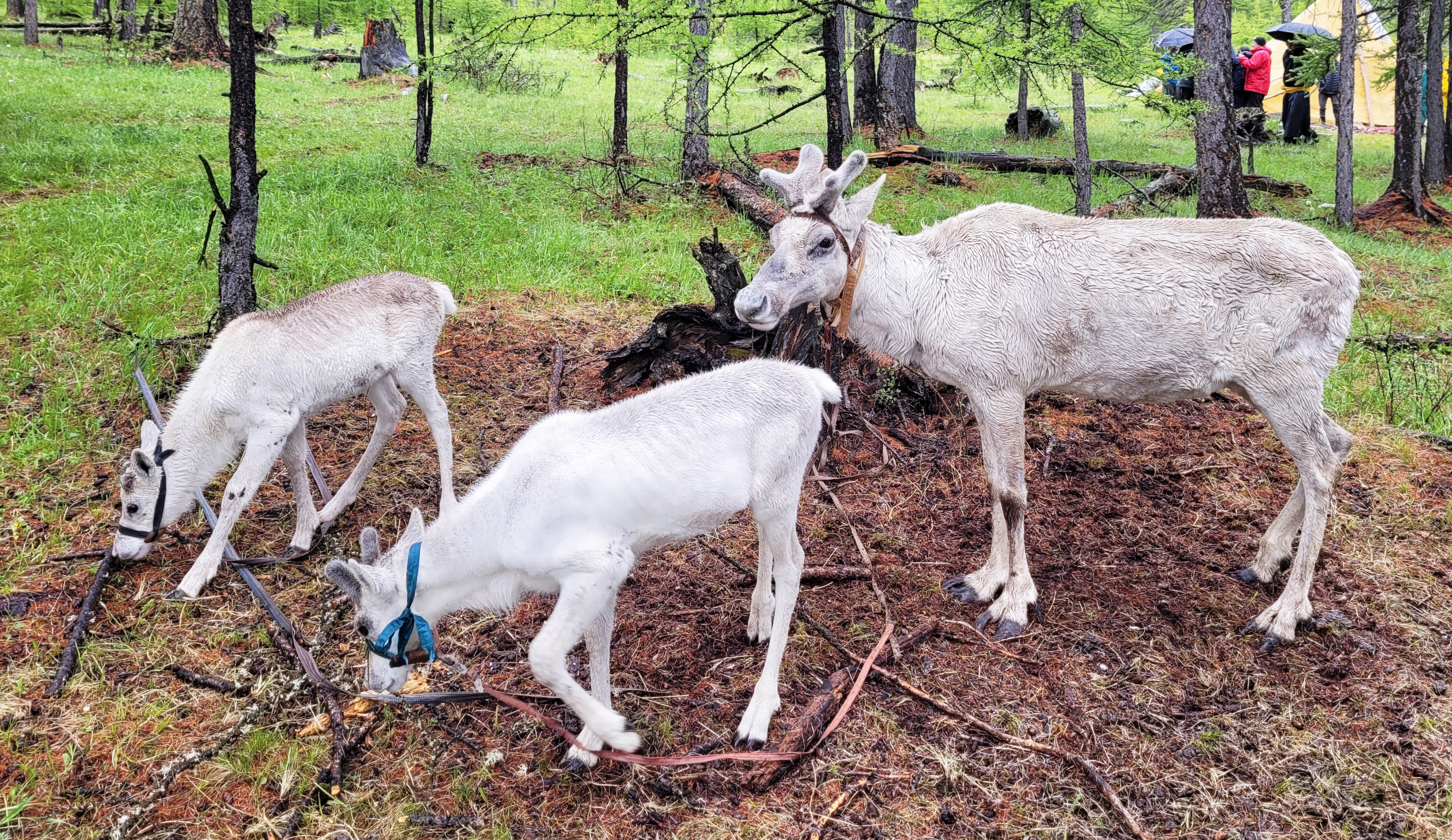
Female and juveniles

The Dukha's sense of community is structured around the reindeer. The reindeer and the Dukha are dependent on one another. Some Dukha say that if the reindeer disappear, so too will their culture. The reindeer are domesticated and belong to the household. In many ways they are treated like family members and shown respect. The community's chores and activities center on the care and feeding of their reindeer. Dukha communities on the taiga are usually a group of tents of two to seven households that move camp to find optimum grazing for the reindeer. Herding tasks are shared amongst the camp with children at a young age learning to care for the reindeer and keeping them safe. The girls and younger women do the milking and make yogurt, cheese, and milk tea. Young men and women and elders help with herding. A few of the men stay with the reindeer in the winter months, living in the open air with their herds to protect them from wolves and other predators. The men also make and repair their hunting tools and reindeer saddles and carts. Since they rarely kill a reindeer, they supplement their diet of reindeer milk products by hunting wild animals from the forest.

Dukha raise their reindeer primarily for milk. Reindeer milk, reindeer yoghurt and reindeer cheese are the staples of the Dukha diet. The reindeer also provide transportation. Because the taiga area is typically hilly and covered with forest, reindeer are not used for pulling sledges, but for riding and as pack animals. They take the Dukha for daily grazing, hunting, the collection of firewood, seasonal migrations, visiting relatives and friends, and traveling to the sum for shopping and trade. A 1.5 m long thin stick in the right hand is used as a whip. A rider gets on a tree stump and jumps onto the reindeer from the left side with the stick in the left hand, then transfers the stick to the right hand once the rider is mounted.

The Dukha begin training reindeer for riding when the reindeer (called dongor at this age) are two years old. Adults are too heavy for dongor, so it is usually the children's job to train them. Children frequently learn to ride reindeer without saddles. Adults ride on hoodai (three-year-old reindeer) or older ones. They regularly ride on zari (castrated males). Special training is not necessary to train the reindeer as pack animals. The male reindeer usually carry loads weighing about 40 kg (88 lbs.), while females carry up to 30 kg (66.1387 lbs.). The reindeer typically make trips every 2–10 weeks for nomadic tribes, and they make traversing the mountainous taiga regions much easier. Various parts of the reindeer are used to make essential items; for example, winter coats are made of reindeer pelts, while bags, traveling mats, and shoes are composed of skin. The antlers have been sold for decades for the creation of traditional Chinese medicine. They are also used to carve tools and as material for souvenirs. For these purposes, the antlers are cut off and harvested annually in early summer. After the reindeer is incapacitated by tying the two front legs to one hind leg, the antlers are sawed off. Pregnant female reindeer are excluded because antlers are essential to body temperature regulation. Additionally, the practice of cutting reindeer antlers has started to decline in recent years due to ethical concerns.

==== Hardship ====
The Dukha people have faced extensive hardship in recent years, including dwindling reindeer populations, a struggling economy, lack of access to healthcare, and a myriad of other issues.

Climate change has negatively altered the taiga inhabited by the Dukha, and the effects, such as a lack of lichen as a source of food, has led to a decline in reindeer herds. Additionally, an outbreak of brucellosis in 1990 reduced the robust population of reindeer, and health issues in the reindeer population continue to this day. As of 2010, there were approximately 600 reindeer left in the region. Efforts of support are being made by organizations such as the Totem Peoples Preservation Project and the Mongolian Reindeer Fund to train herders within the Dukha population and aid them in preserving the health of their reindeer.

=== Shelter ===
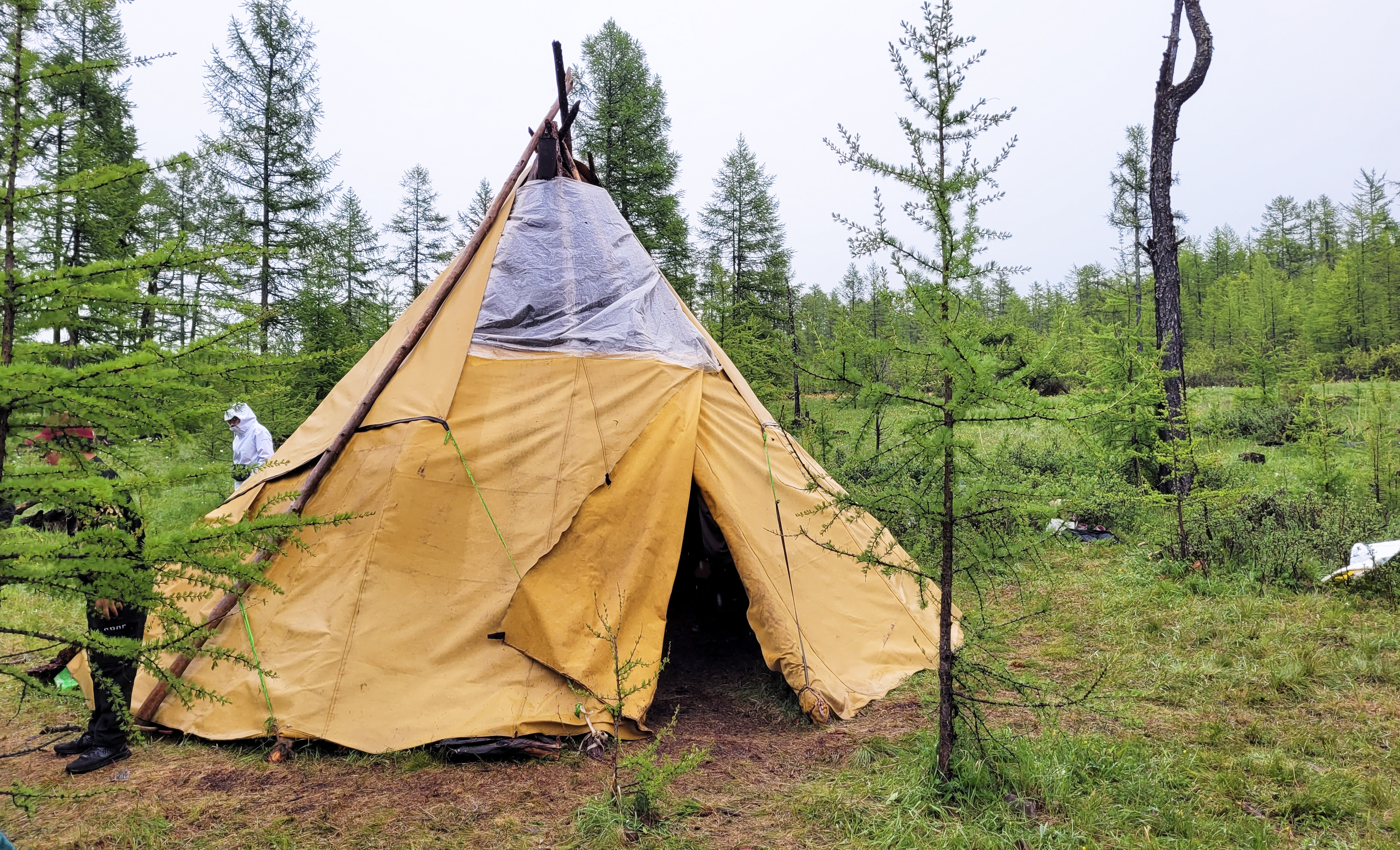
Dukha tent in Mongolia

The Dukha live in ortz, yurts that resemble Native-Americans tepees. A large yurt may take birch bark from up to 32 trees to make; a medium-sized yurt is made from the bark of 23-25 trees.

=== Clothing ===
Dukha dress is characterized by hats like those of the Khalkh people, and wide deels (traditional Mongolian overcoats). They wear strong, warm boots fashioned from the hides and sinew of their reindeer.

Only a few reindeer are slaughtered during the year for meat and pelts.

== Seasonal migration and residential groups ==
The Dukha are semi-nomadic. They move from one place to another without establishing any permanent settlements during the year. A residential group consisting of several families is called olal-lal (meaning ’them’ in the Tuva language). They usually refer to a specific group by the name of a representative member. Families of the same olal-lal set up tents close to one another (within a few kilometers) and collaborate in livestock herding.

== Belief and religion ==
The Dukha believe in Shamanism, tengrism, and animism. All aspects of nature, such as the earth and sky, as well as ancestors, are revered as powerful forces that reign over the lives of humans. The Shamanistic practices among Dukha people differ from those of other Shamanistic religions in the region. Shaman worship among the Tsaatan people is thought to represent the oldest variant of Shamanism practiced by Turkic and Mongolian nomads. Not only do they worship their Shaman, whom they call 'Boo', but they have many mystical holy books as well, and use many different treatises in their daily lives, including those for hunting and for calling or banishing the rain.

Other traditions include shaman ceremonies for welcoming the new moon and specific practices for retrieving river water.

The Shamanistic beliefs of the Dhuka revolve around the sacredness of the reindeer. These beliefs prevent them from slaughtering and eating reindeer for the most part, as they are considered sacred animals. Instead, they hunt and eat elk, moose, bear, sable, and boar for protein.

During the period of Communist rule in Mongolia (1924-1992) the Shamanistic religious traditions of the Dukha people were suppressed by the government. Shamans were arrested and the tombs of their ancestors were smashed. Following the end of Communist rule, the Dukha people were once again allowed to freely practice their traditional faith.
