= Belin (river) =

Location
- Country: Russia

Physical characteristics
- Mouth: Little Yenisey
  - coordinates: 51°30′11″N 98°02′09″E
- Length: 130 km (81 mi)
- Basin size: 3,200 km^{2} (1,200 sq mi)

Basin features
- Progression: Little Yenisey→ Yenisey→ Kara Sea

The Belin (Russian: Белин, also: Билин Bilin) is a river in Tuva. It is a tributary of the Little Yenisey (Kızıl-Xem), running parallel to the Mongolian border. It is 130 kilometres (81 mi) long, and has a drainage basin of 3,200 square kilometres (1,200 sq mi).
