= Little Yenisei =

River in Mongolia and Russia

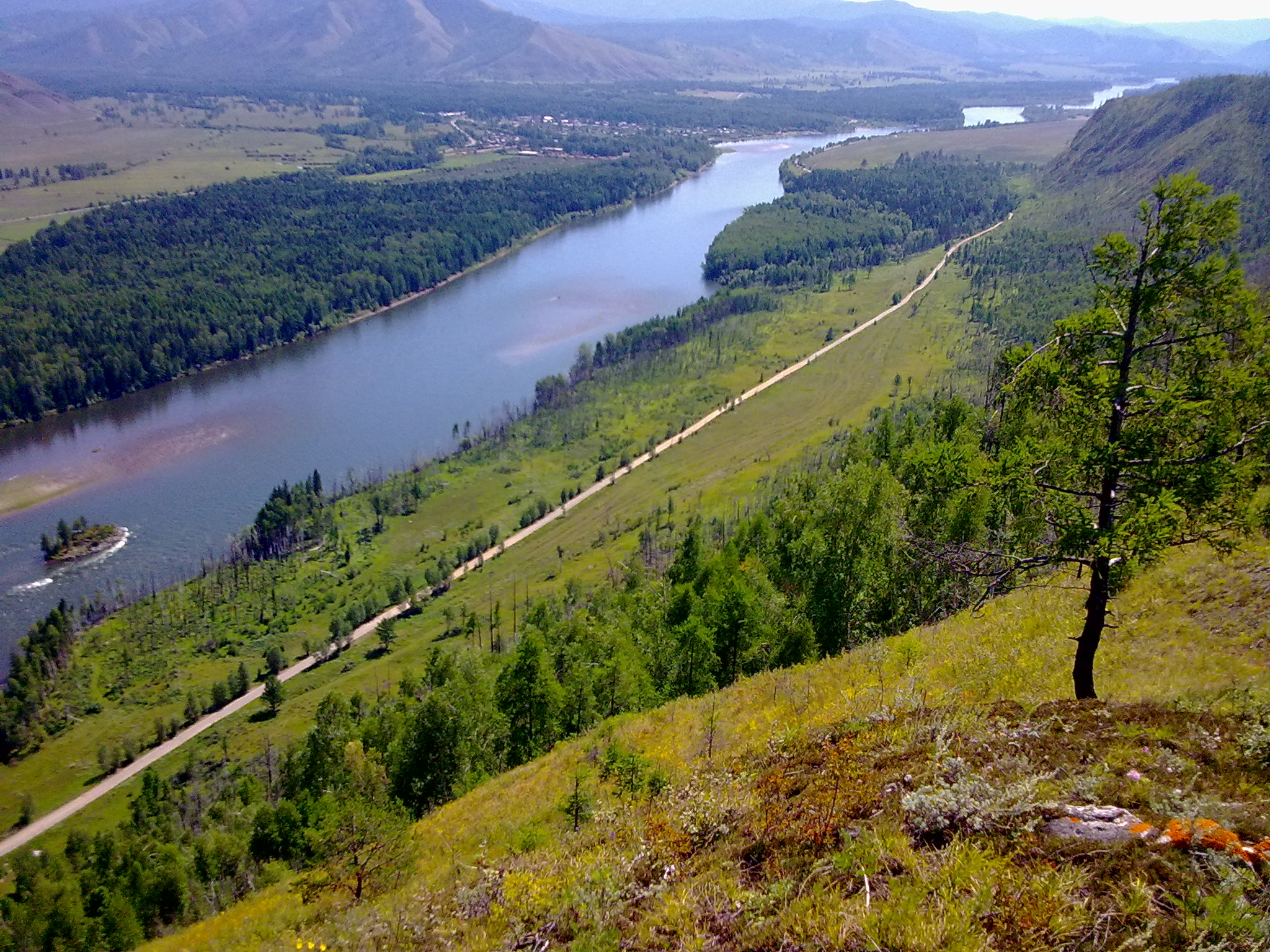
- Kaa-Khem
- Native name: Малый Енисей (Russian); Каа-Хем (Tuvan); Шишгэд гол (Mongolian)

Location
- Country: Mongolia, Russia
- State: Khövsgöl, Tuva

Physical characteristics
- Source
  - location: Khoridol Saridag mountains
- Mouth: Yenisei
  - location: Kyzyl, Tuva
  - coordinates: 51°30′N 98°2′E
- Length: 563 km (350 mi)

Basin features
- Progression: Yenisey→ Kara Sea
- Tributaries
  - left: Busiyn-Gol, Balyktyg-Khem
  - right: Sharga, Tengis, Belin

The Little Yenisei (Russian: Малый Енисей, romanized: Mályy Yeniséy, pronounced [ˈmalɨj (j)ɪnʲɪˈsʲej]; Tuvan: Каа-Хем, Кызыл-Хем, romanized: Kâ-Xem, Kızıl-Xem; (Note: The origins of the term xem (or kem) are unclear. The name kem for rivers is widespread from central Siberia in the east (e.g. the Yenisei tributary), west to Finland (e.g. the Kemi), and was notably a historical name for the Upper Yenisei. The name comes from an ancient word kem or hem, with meaning of "great river", but its linguistic origin is disputed. Various Turkic, Samoyed and Iranian derivations have been proposed, but these have also been disputed. The term survives as a word only in Siberian Turkic languages: in Tuvan as xem (хем), meaning "river" (but only used in the names of rivers) and in its sister language, Tofa, as hem (hем), also meaning "river". These languages are considered to have had close contact with those mentioned above in ancient times. Additionally, there are just over 50 river names containing the suffix -kem -кем in the Altai Republic, and the term kim (ким) as in Kim suğ (Ким суғ), meaning "Yenisei River" also is present in Khakas. All of these instances are confined to the region in and around the present-day Tannu-Tuva.) Mongolian: Шишгэд гол, romanized: Shishged gol, pronounced [ˈɕʲiɕgɪt ɢɔɮ]) is a river in northern Mongolia and in Tuva, Russia. At its confluence with the Great Yenisei in Kyzyl (Tuva), the Yenisei is formed. It is 563 kilometres (350 mi) long, and has a drainage basin of 58,700 square kilometres (22,700 sq mi). It rises as the Shishged Gol in the Darkhad Valley in northwestern Khövsgöl aimag in Mongolia.

In the Darkhad Valley, it receives its tributaries Sharga and Tengis. It flows westward through the Ulaan Taiga Mountain range to Russia. There it is joined by the Busiyn-Gol, the Belin and the Balyktyg-Khem. Of its 563 km length, 298 are in Mongolia. A pontoon bridge (51.4096091, 99.2927539) has been erected near the center of the Renchinlkhümbe district. A second wooden toll bridge (51.0963890, 99.3186744) is further south upstream providing access from the south to the Renchinlkhümbe district.

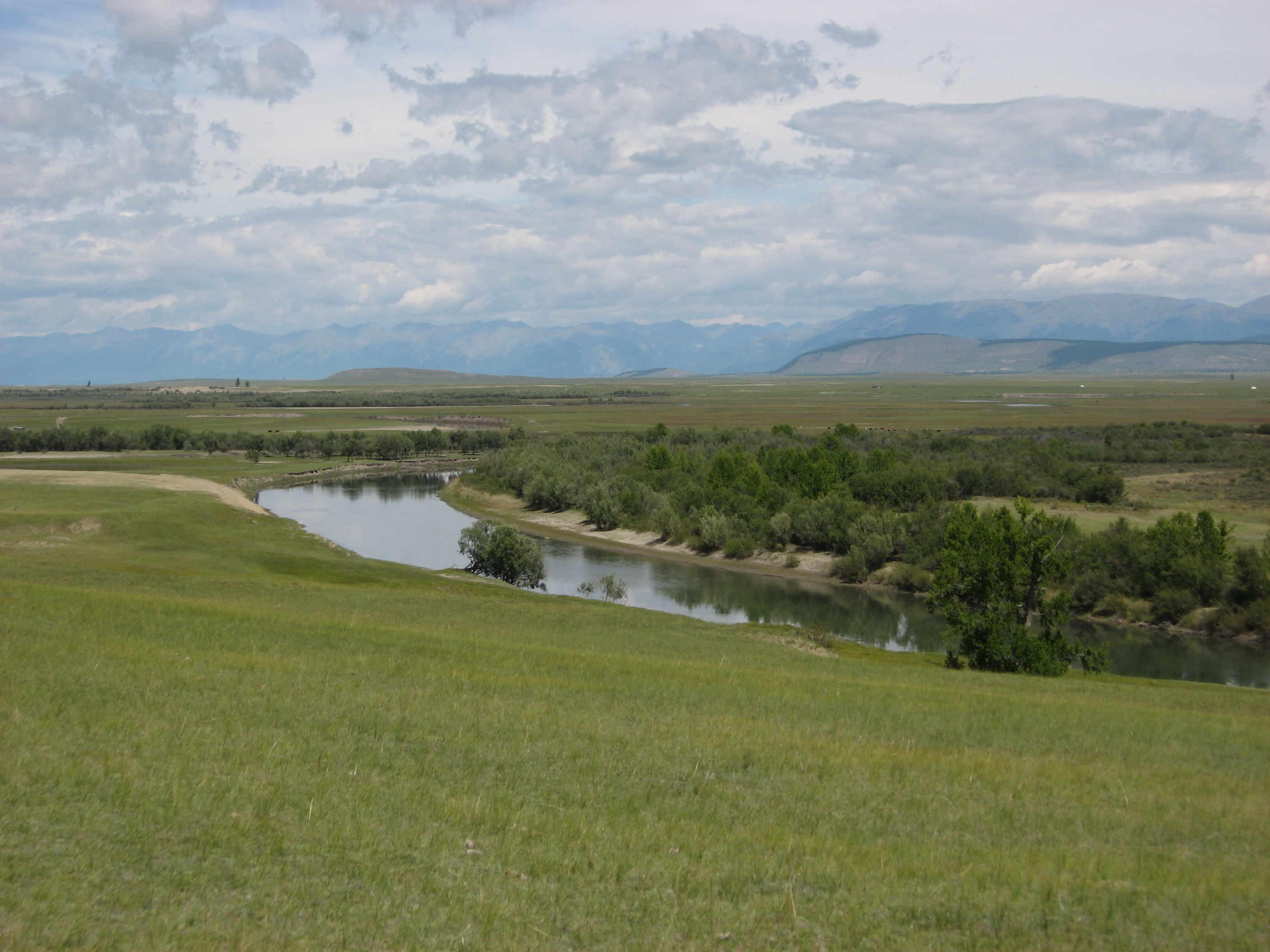
The Shishged Gol near Renchinlkhümbe

== See also ==
- List of rivers of Mongolia
- List of rivers of Russia
