= Kem (Yenisey) =

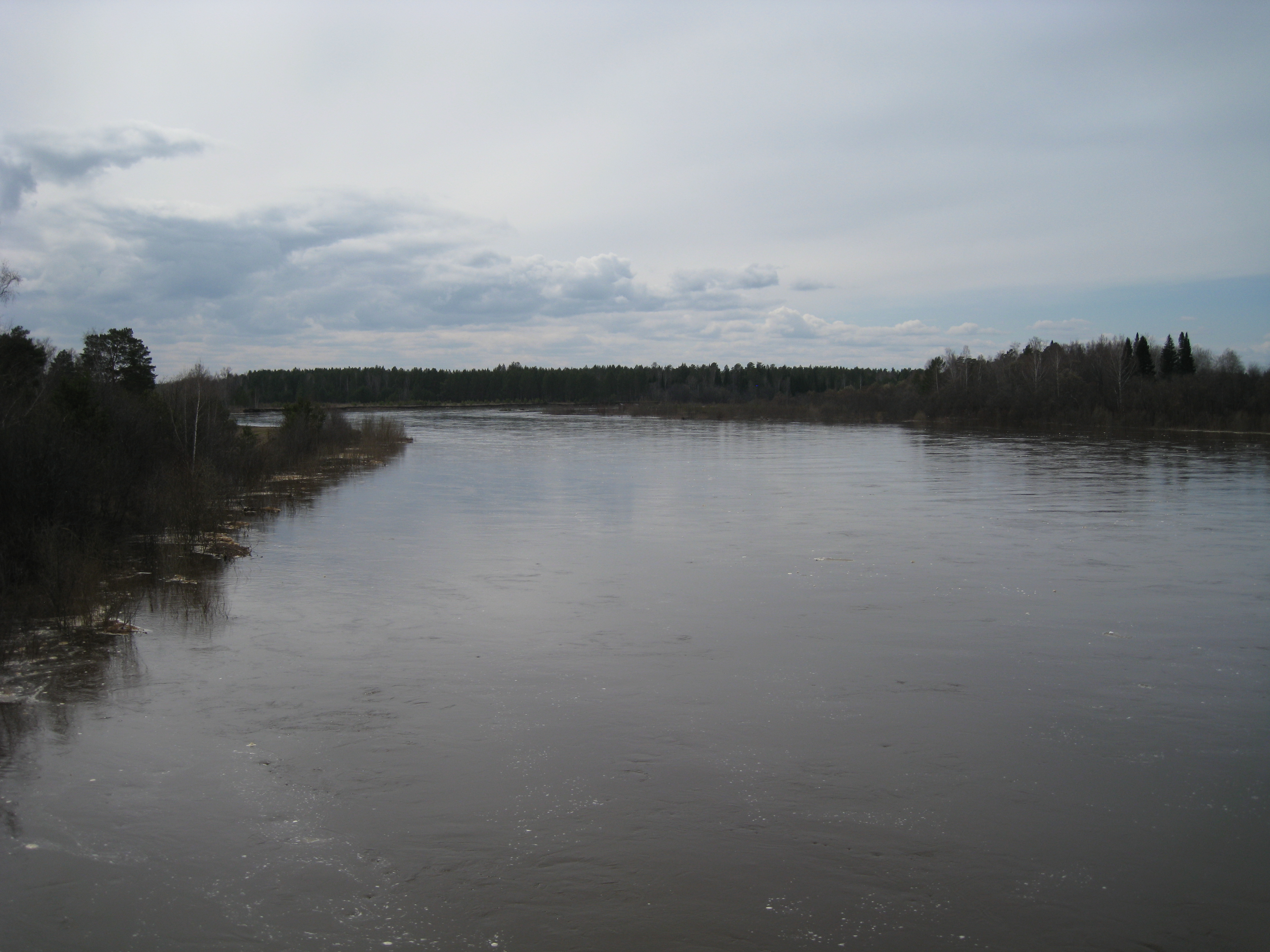
- Kem river during the flood season

- Location within Krasnoyarsk Krai
- Native name: Кемь (Russian)

Location
- Country: Russia
- Region: Krasnoyarsk Krai
- District: Bolshemurtinsky District, Kazachinsky District, Pirovsky District, Yeniseysky District

Physical characteristics
- Source
  - coordinates: 57°06′06″N 92°38′02″E
- Mouth: Yenisey
  - coordinates: 58°31′04″N 92°05′44″E
- Length: 356 km (221 mi)
- Basin size: 8,940 km^{2} (3,450 sq mi)
- Discharge
  - location: 141 km from the mouth
  - average: 12.86 m^{3}/s (454 cu ft/s)

Basin features
- Progression: Yenisey→ Kara Sea

Kem (Russian: Кемь) is a river in Krasnoyarsk Krai, Siberia, Russia. It is a left bank tributary of the Yenisey.

The origins of the term kem are unclear. This name for rivers is widespread from central Siberia in the east, west to Finland (e.g. the Kemi), and was notably a historical name for the Upper Yenisei. The name comes from an ancient word kem or hem, with meaning of "great river", but its linguistic origin is disputed. Various Turkic, Samoyed and Iranian derivations have been proposed, but these have also been disputed.

The term survives as a word only in Siberian Turkic languages: in Tuvan as xem (хем), meaning "river" (but only used in the names of rivers) and in its sister language, Tofa, as hem (hем), also meaning "river". These languages are considered to have had close contact with those mentioned above in ancient times. Additionally, there are just over 50 river names containing the suffix -kem -кем in the Altai Republic, and the term kim (ким) as in Kim suğ (Ким суғ), meaning "Yenisei River" also is present in Khakas. All of these instances are confined to the region in and around the present-day Tannu-Tuva.

== Course ==
The river flows across the West Siberian Plain through the districts of Bolshemurtinsky, Kazachinsky, Pirovsky, and Yeniseysky District before discharging into the Yenisei River close to the town of Yeniseysk at 2045 kilometers before the mouth. The Kem is 356 kilometres (221 miles) long. Its drainage basin covers a total area of 8,940 square kilometres (3,452 square miles). The most important tributaries of the Kem are the Tyya (Russian: Тыя) at the 97 kilometer from the mouth and the Belaya (Russian: Белая) at the 115 kilometer from the mouth. Both major tributaries are on the left side. The source of the Kem is located in Bolshemurtinsky District where it rises as a small creek in the East Siberian taiga. Due to the tributary rivers, towards the mouth river reaches 45 meters of width.

The Kem flows mostly through the plain and vegetation grows directly up to the river shores and water. The bottom of the river is covered with a lot of clay and sandy-clay and a river water is generally not clear. The upper reaches of the river flows through the mixed type taiga covered with conifers (larch, fir, spruce, cedar), birch and aspen, as well as through the areas that are categorized as a standard mixed forest. Due to the tributary rivers, towards the mouth the river reaches 45 meters of width.

== Protected area ==
Kem's Biological Reserve is located on the 16 000 hectares of the land that stretched along the banks of the river. In 1963 the project of restoration of population of beavers started here with 20 individuals of this species being brought in the region.

== See also ==
- List of rivers of Russia
