= Tengiz Gatikoyev =

Russian footballer

Personal information
- Full name: Tengiz Anatolyevich Gatikoyev
- Date of birth: 18 August 1970 (age 56)
- Height: 1.85 m (6 ft 1 in)
- Positions: Forward; midfielder

Youth career
- DSO Urozhay Krasnodar

Senior career*
Years	Team	Apps	(Gls)
1990	FC Kooperator Pavlovskaya		
1991	FC Torpedo Armavir	38	(6)
1992–1993	FC Okean Nakhodka	15	(0)
1993	→ FC Okean-d Nakhodka (loan)	2	(1)
1993	FC Kolos-2 Krasnodar	1	(0)
1993	FC Kuban Krasnodar	17	(1)
1994	FC Lada Togliatti	8	(0)
1995	FC Izumrud Timashyovsk		
1996	FC Druzhba Maykop	29	(2)
1996	→ FC Kommunalnik-Druzhba-d Maykop (loan)	1	(0)
1998–2000	FC Dynamo Krasnodar		
2001	PFC Spartak Nalchik	7	(1)
2001	→ PFC Spartak-2 Nalchik (loan)	2	(1)
2002	FC Kuban Ust-Labinsk		
2002–2003	FC Vympel Krasnodar		
2003	FC Neftyanik Kubani Goryachiy Klyuch		
2005	FC Dynamo Krasnodar		
2008	FC Dynamo Krasnodar		
- * Club domestic league appearances and goals

Tengiz Anatolyevich Gatikoyev (Russian: Тенгиз Анатольевич Гатикоев; born 18 August 1970) is a former Russian football player.
