= Bayanzürkh, Khövsgöl =

District in Khövsgöl Province, Mongolia

Bayanzürkh District Баянзүрх сум ᠪᠠᠶ᠋ᠠᠨᠵᠢᠷᠦᠭᠡᠰᠤᠮᠤ
- District
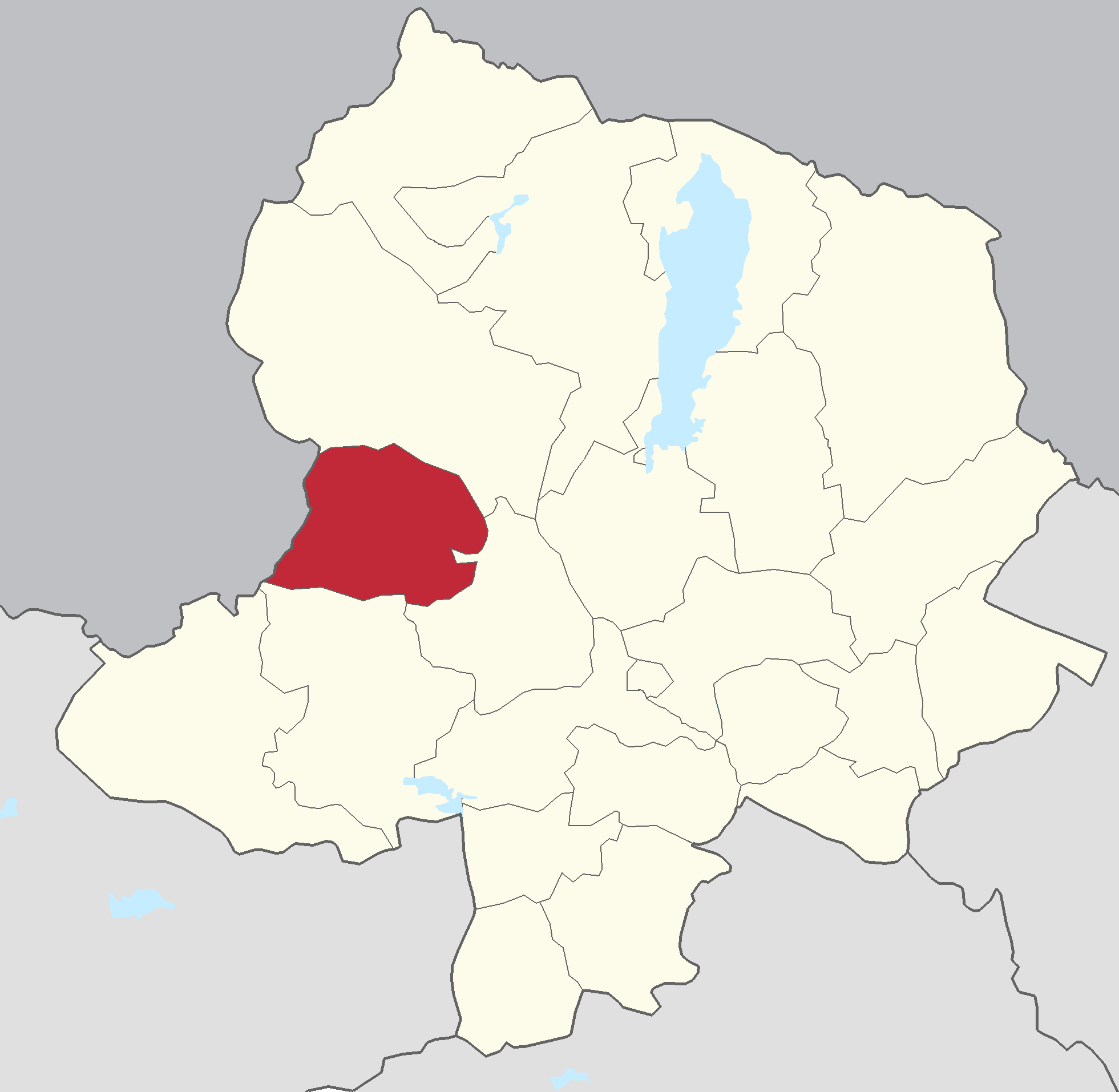
- Bayanzürkh District in Khövsgöl Province
- Coordinates: 50°10′36″N 98°58′28″E
- Country: Mongolia
- Province: Khövsgöl Province
- Time zone: UTC+8 (UTC + 8)

Bayanzürkh (Mongolian: Баянзүрх, lit. "rich heart") is a sum (district) of Khövsgöl aimag (province) in Mongolia. The area is about 4,300 km^{2} (1,700 sq mi), of which 2,600 km^{2} (1,000 sq mi) are pasture. In 2000, the sum had 4202 inhabitants, mainly Darkhad. The center, officially named Altraga (Mongolian: Алтрага), is located at the confluence of the Altraga and Beltes rivers, near the Delgermörön river, 127 km northwest of Mörön and 798 kilometres (496 mi) from Ulaanbaatar.

== History ==
A Bayanzürkh sum was founded, together with the whole aimag, in 1931. In 1933, the bigger part of that sum became Ulaan-Uul sum. In the same year, Bayanzürkh had about 1,100 inhabitants in 499 households, and about 49,000 heads of livestock. Between 1952 and 1990, Bayanzürkh was the seat of the Soyol negdel.

== Administrative divisions ==
The district is divided into five bags, which are:

- Agar
- Beltes
- Emt
- Khais
- Toom

== Economy ==
In 2004, there were roughly 110,000 head of livestock, among them 55,000 sheep, 36,000 goats, 13,000 cattle and yaks, 6,000 horses, and 280 camels.

== Notable natives ==
- Ölziisaikhany Erdene-Ochir, wrestler

== Literature ==
M.Nyamaa, Khövsgöl aimgiin lavlakh toli, Ulaanbaatar 2001, p. 29f
