= Darkhad Valley =

Valley in Khövsgöl, Mongolia

Coordinates: 51°10′N 99°30′E

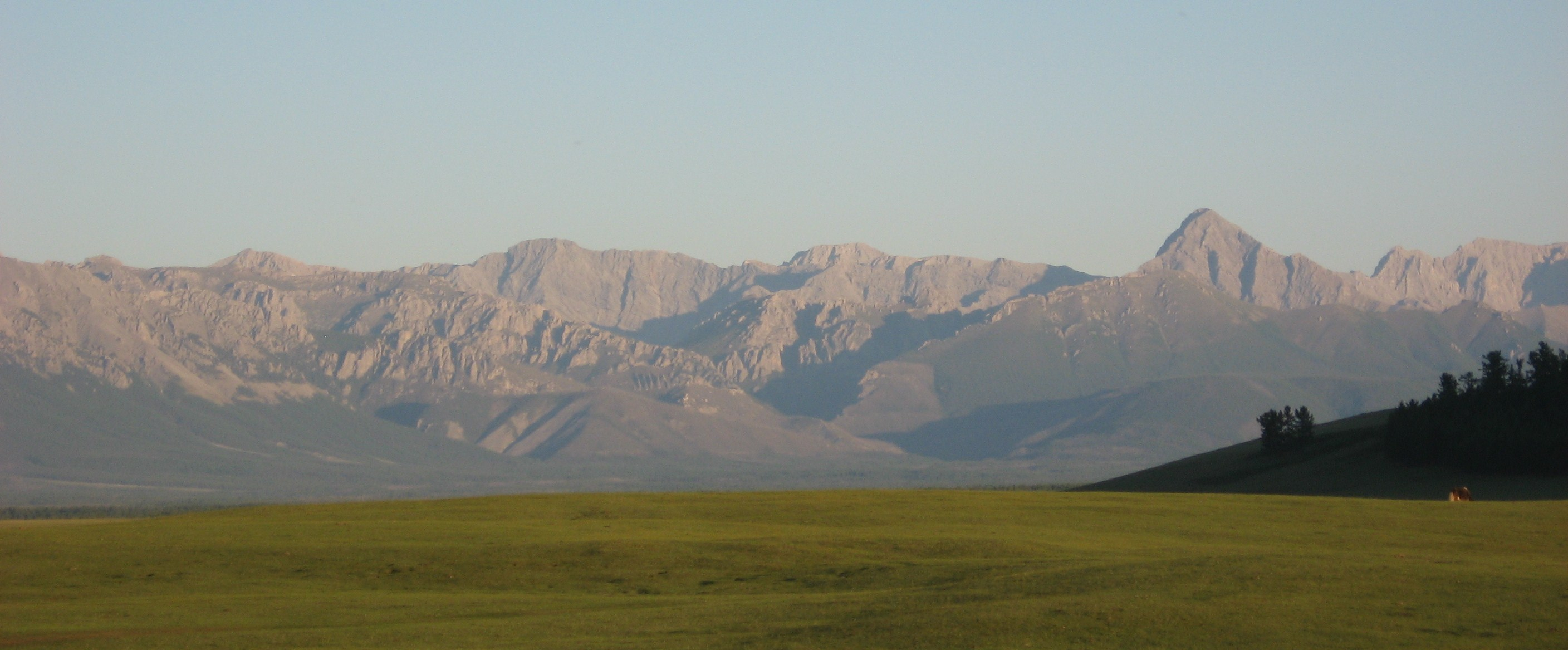
Darkhad valley

The Darkhad Valley (Mongolian: Дархадын хотгор, romanized: Darkhadiin khotgor) is a large valley in northwestern Khövsgöl Province, Mongolia. It is situated between the Ulaan Taiga and Khoridol Saridag ranges at an altitude of about 1600 m, about 160 km long and 40 km wide. The area is 4270 km^{2}. It was transferred from the People's Republic of Tannu Tuva to the Mongolian People's Republic in 1925 as a Soviet concession to the Mongolians, who had wanted to incorporate the territory of Tannu Uriankhai into their country.

The valley is rich in lakes and rivers, the biggest of which are Dood Tsagaan Lake and Shishged River, respectively. The area is noted for its natural environment, but relatively remote and inaccessible even by Mongolian standards.

The Darkhad valley is divided between the Ulaan-Uul, Renchinlkhümbe, and Tsagaannuur sums. Inhabitants are mainly Darkhad (whom the valley's name derives from), and also some Tsaatan.

Jeff Colhoun published a book and made a documentary film about the group Rally for Rangers working to provide park rangers with motorcycles and featured the valley in his documentary Darkhad Valley.
