= Tsagaannuur, Khövsgöl =

District in Khövsgöl Province, Mongolia

Tsagaannuur District Цагааннуур сум ᠴᠠᠭᠠᠨᠨᠠᠭᠤᠷᠰᠤᠮᠤ
- District
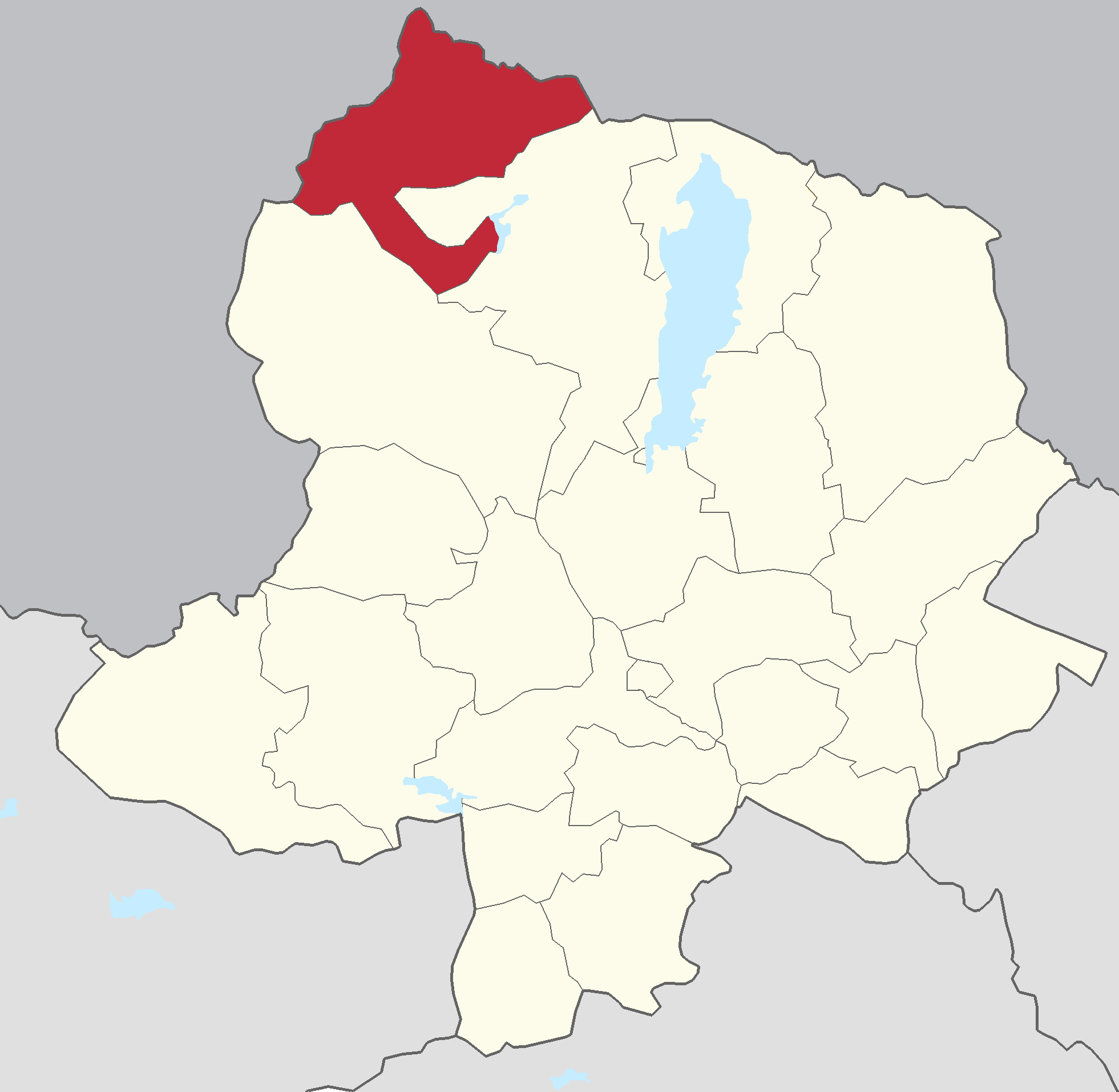
- Tsagaannuur District in Khövsgöl Province

- Location in Mongolia
- Coordinates: 51°21′16″N 99°21′12″E
- Country: Mongolia
- Province: Khövsgöl

Area
  - Total: 2,090 sq mi (5,410 km^{2})

Population (2007)
  - Total: 1,411
  - Density: 0.67/sq mi (0.26/km^{2})
- Time zone: UTC+8

Tsagaannuur (Mongolian: Цагааннуур, white lake) is a sum of Khövsgöl aimag. The area is 5,410 km^{2}. In 2000, Tsagaannuur had a population of 1,317 people, of which most identified themselves as Darkhad. There were 269 inhabitants who identified themselves as Tsaatan ethnicity. The sum center, officially named Gurvansaikhan (Mongolian: Гурвансайхан), is located at the shore of Dood Tsagaan Lake.

== History ==
The Tsagaannuur sum was split off from Renchinlkhümbe in 1985.

== Administrative divisions ==
The district is divided into two bags, which are:

- Gurvansaikhan
- Kharmai

== Economy ==
In 2004, there were about 8,000 heads of livestock, among them 2,400 goats, 2,100 sheep, 2,300 cattle and yaks, 1,100 horses, 6 camels, and 632 reindeer. Tsagaannuur houses the only commercial fishing enterprise in Mongolia.

According to the statistics provided by the Tsagaan Nuur Sum government on November 13, 2014, in a general assembly with residents of the sum's Xarmai district, the total amount of domestic reindeer in both nearby West Taiga and in East Taiga is 1511.

== Notable places ==
This sum covers the north-western part of the Darkhad valley, a basin that is considered remote even by Mongolian standards. Both Tsaatan and Darkhad practice shamanism.

== Literature ==
M. Nyamaa, Khövsgöl aimgiin lavlakh toli, Ulaanbaatar 2001, p. 193f
