= Ulaan-Uul, Khövsgöl =

District in Khövsgöl Province, Mongolia

Coordinates: 50°40′46″N 99°13′37″E

Ulaan-Uul District Улаан-Уул сум ᠤᠯᠠᠭᠠᠨᠠᠭᠤᠯᠠᠰᠤᠮᠤ
- District
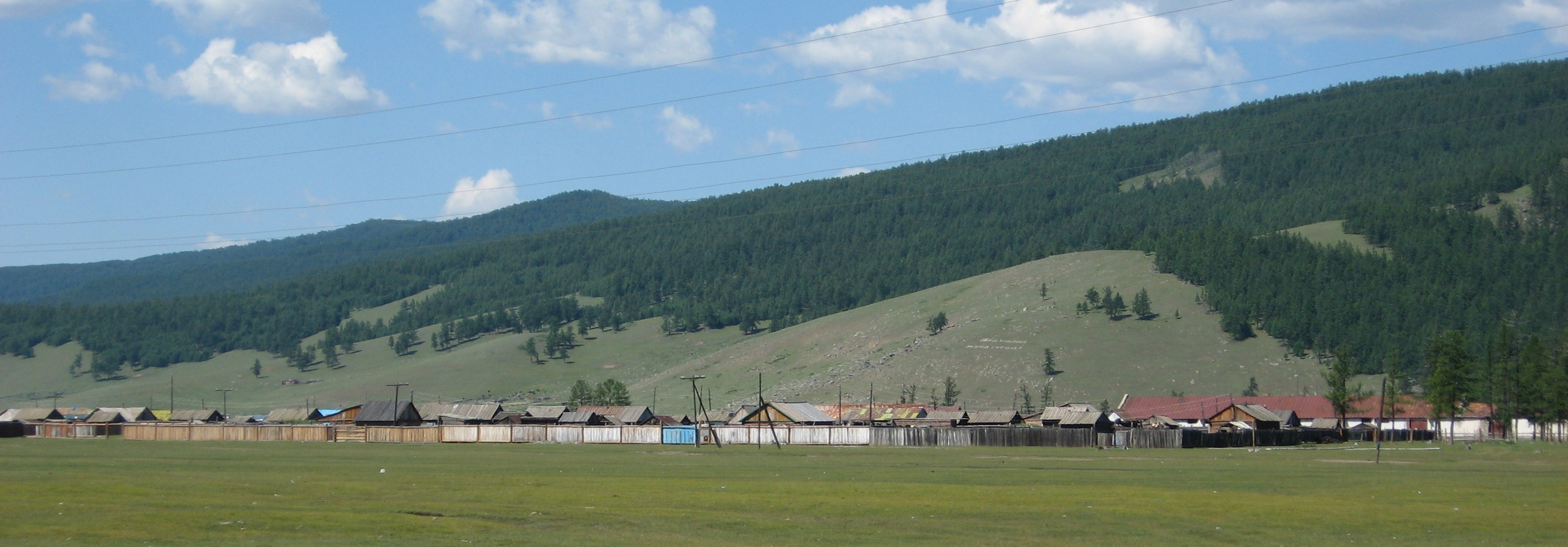
- The sum center

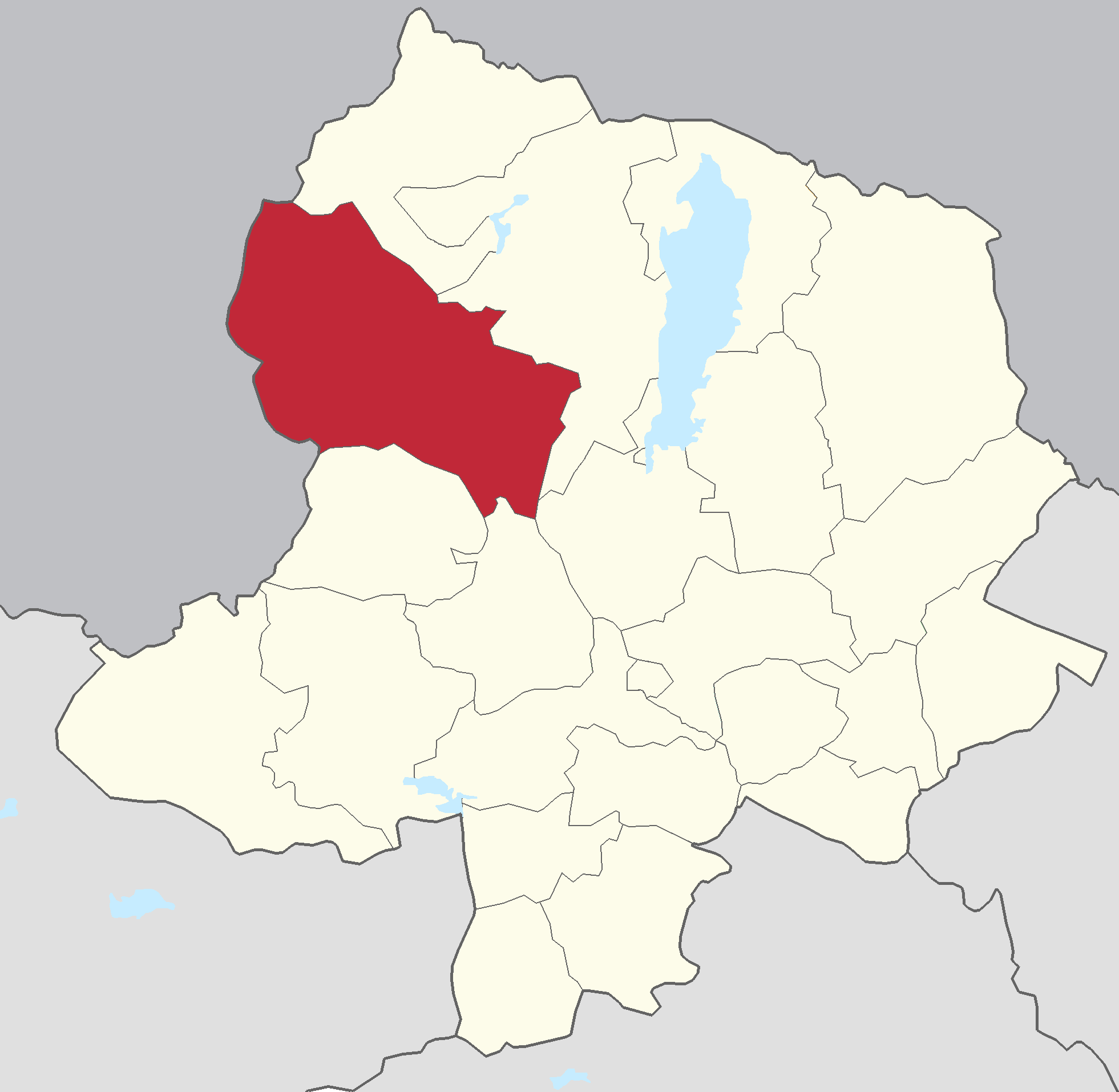
- Ulaan-Uul District in Khövsgöl Province
- Country: Mongolia
- Province: Khövsgöl Province
- Time zone: UTC+8 (UTC + 8)

Ulaan-Uul (Mongolian: Улаан-Уул = red mountain) is a sum of Khövsgöl aimag. The area is close to 10,000 km^{2}. In 2000, Ulaan-Uul had a population of 3,726 people, mainly Darkhad. The sum center, officially named Tögöl (Mongolian: Төгөл), is located 171 km north-north-west of Mörön and 942 km from Ulaanbaatar.

== History ==
The Ulaan-Uul sum was formed from the bigger part of Bayanzürkh sum in 1933. From 1956 to 1990, it was the seat of the Jargalant Amidral negdel.

== Administrative divisions ==
The district is divided into six bags, which are:

- Gun Bag
- Mungarag
- Shivleg
- Soyoo
- Toom
- Tugul

== Economy ==
In 2004, there were about 72,000 heads of livestock, among them 23,000 goats, 24,000 sheep, 17,000 cattle, yaks, and khainags, 7,000 horses, and 216 camels.

== Interesting Places ==
Ulaan-Uul sum covers the southern part of the Darkhad valley, a basin that is considered remote even by Mongolian standards. The locals practice a form of shamanism strongly influenced by Buddhism, and the Öliin davaa pass (literally "bald pass") that enters the Darkhad valley from the south has a group of 13 ovoos constructed of standing sticks in tepee form that are regularly used for festivals and naadam. Both the Delgerkhaan uul and parts of the Ulaan Taiga National Park are located in this sum.

== Literature ==
M. Nyamaa, Khövsgöl aimgiin lavlakh toli, Ulaanbaatar 2001, p. 144f
