= Renchinlhümbe =

District in Khövsgöl Province, Mongolia

Renchinlhümbe District Рэнчинлхүмбэ сум ᠷᠢᠨᠴᠢᠨ ᡀᠦᠮᠪᠦ ᠰᠤᠮᠤ
- District
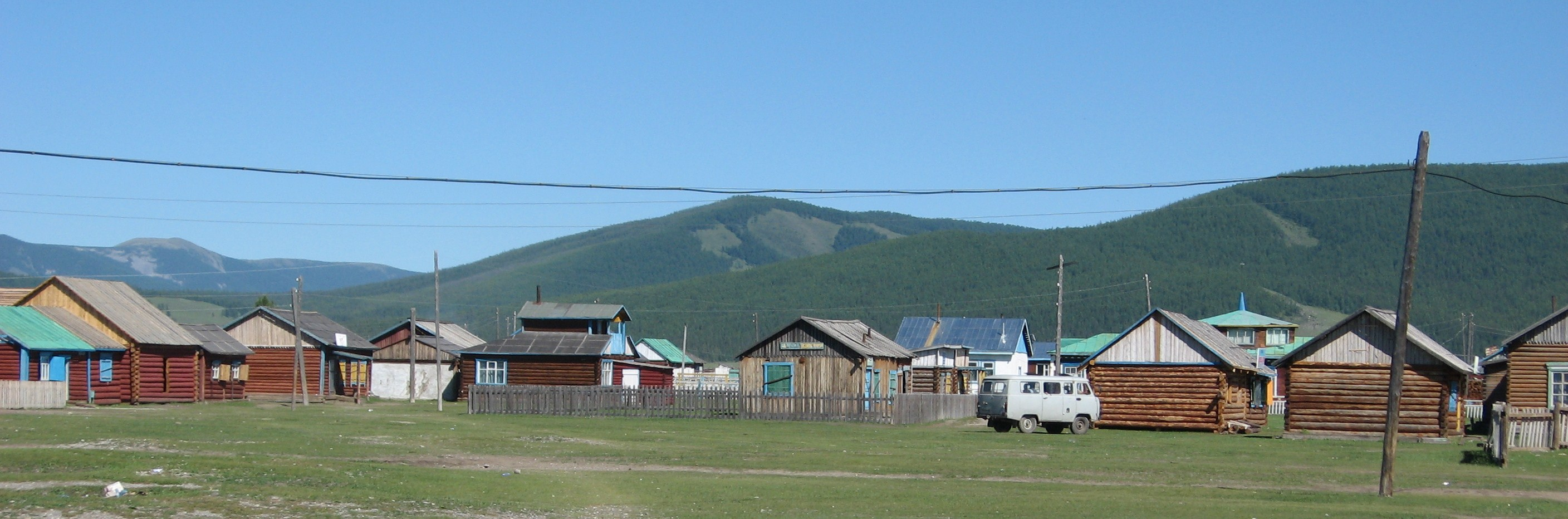
- Renchinlhümbe sum center

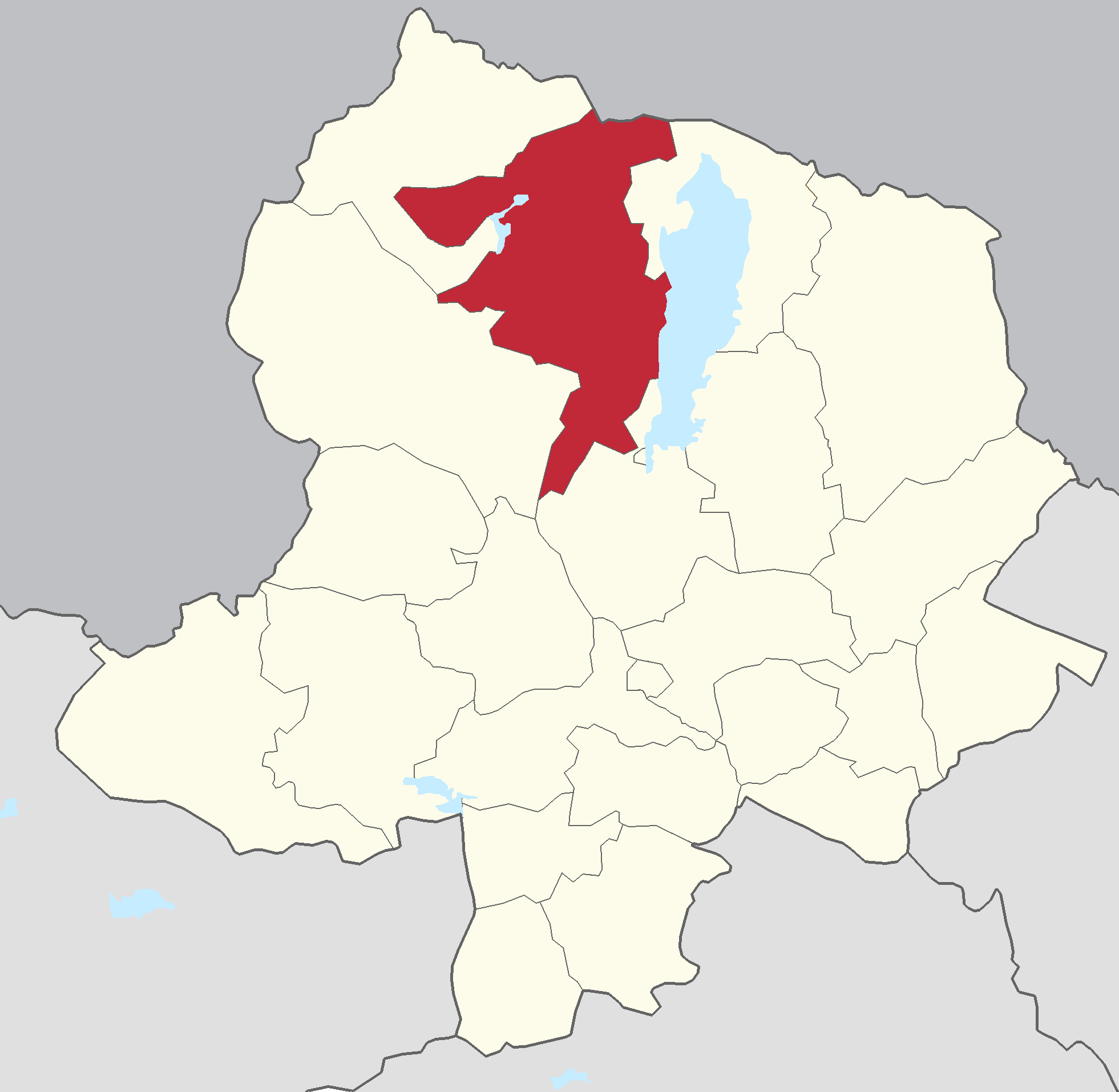
- Renchinlhümbe District in Khövsgöl Province

- Location within Mongolia
- Coordinates: 51°6′31″N 99°40′15″E
- Country: Mongolia
- Province: Khövsgöl Province
- Time zone: UTC+8 (UTC + 8)

Renchinlhümbe (Mongolian: Рэнчинлхүмбэ = Mound of Jewels or Precious summit) is a district of Khövsgöl Province in Mongolia. Its area is approximately 8,850 square kilometres (3,420 sq mi), of which 2,910 square kilometres (1,120 sq mi) are pasture and 35% are forest. As of the 2000 census, it had a population of 4,284, most of whom belonged to the Darkhad subgroup. The district centre is officially named Zöölön (Mongolian: Зөөлөн), which is 265 kilometres (165 mi) north of Mörön and 998 kilometres (620 mi) from Ulaanbaatar.

== History ==
Renchinlhümbe was founded, together with the whole Khövsgöl aimag, in 1931. In 1933, it had about 1,800 inhabitants in 544 households, and about 32,000 heads of livestock. The local Altan Tal (Golden Steppe) negdel was founded in 1956. The Zöölöngiin Khüree monastery (est. in 1750) had been located near what is now the sum center since 1771. In 1985, the sum was split into two to form the new Tsagaannuur sum and leaving the original Renchinlhümbe sum area to be smaller.

== Climate ==
Renchinlhümbe has a subarctic climate (Köppen climate classification Dwc) with cool summers and bitterly cold winters. The average minimum temperature in January is −37.0 °C (−34.6 °F), and temperatures as low as −50 °C (−58 °F) have been recorded. Most precipitation falls in the summer as rain, with some snow in the adjacent months of May and September. Winters are very dry. With an average temperature of −7.8 °C (18.0 °F) Renchinlhümbe lies in the continuous permafrost zone.

Climate data for Renchinlhümbe, elevation 1,583 m (5,194 ft), (1991–2020 normals, extremes 1973–1990, 2001–2023)
Month	Jan	Feb	Mar	Apr	May	Jun	Jul	Aug	Sep	Oct	Nov	Dec	Year
Record high °C (°F)	−4.5 (23.9)	4.5 (40.1)	16.0 (60.8)	23.7 (74.7)	27.5 (81.5)	30.4 (86.7)	32.0 (89.6)	31.5 (88.7)	29.2 (84.6)	21.6 (70.9)	9.7 (49.5)	2.2 (36.0)	32.0 (89.6)
Mean daily maximum °C (°F)	−27.7 (−17.9)	−20.2 (−4.4)	−6.2 (20.8)	6.8 (44.2)	13.5 (56.3)	20.0 (68.0)	22.1 (71.8)	19.7 (67.5)	13.3 (55.9)	2.6 (36.7)	−11.7 (10.9)	−24.2 (−11.6)	0.7 (33.2)
Daily mean °C (°F)	−32.6 (−26.7)	−26.8 (−16.2)	−14.5 (5.9)	−1.0 (30.2)	5.8 (42.4)	12.6 (54.7)	14.9 (58.8)	12.3 (54.1)	5.4 (41.7)	−4.2 (24.4)	−17.8 (0.0)	−29.2 (−20.6)	−6.3 (20.7)
Mean daily minimum °C (°F)	−36.7 (−34.1)	−32.7 (−26.9)	−22.0 (−7.6)	−7.6 (18.3)	−2.3 (27.9)	4.8 (40.6)	7.7 (45.9)	5.2 (41.4)	−1.9 (28.6)	−10.1 (13.8)	−23.0 (−9.4)	−33.4 (−28.1)	−12.7 (9.2)
Record low °C (°F)	−50.1 (−58.2)	−48.1 (−54.6)	−41.2 (−42.2)	−35.5 (−31.9)	−17.5 (0.5)	−6.8 (19.8)	−2.5 (27.5)	−7.8 (18.0)	−17.4 (0.7)	−35.6 (−32.1)	−44.3 (−47.7)	−48.1 (−54.6)	−50.1 (−58.2)
Average precipitation mm (inches)	2.5 (0.10)	1.5 (0.06)	2.8 (0.11)	6.8 (0.27)	19.0 (0.75)	48.2 (1.90)	78.5 (3.09)	58.2 (2.29)	30.1 (1.19)	8.0 (0.31)	5.5 (0.22)	2.0 (0.08)	263.1 (10.37)
Average precipitation days (≥ 1.0 mm)	0.8	0.3	1.1	2.0	4.3	7.5	10.5	7.8	5.1	2.3	1.9	0.8	44.4
Mean monthly sunshine hours	208.8	199.3	221.2	235.2	296.2	310.2	317.9	324.5	305.4	290.2	245.6	215.2	3,169.7
Source 1: NOAA (precipitation and sun 1973–1990)
Source 2: Starlings Roost Weather

== Administrative divisions ==
The district is divided into six bags, which are:

- Dalain Zakh
- Khodon
- Khooloin Zakh
- Khundii
- Yolt
- Zuulun

== Economy ==
In 2004, there were roughly 95,000 heads of livestock, among them 34,000 sheep, 30,000 goats, 21,000 cattle and yaks, 9,200 horses, and 170 camels.

== Miscellaneous ==
The area forms part of the Darkhad Valley, and is considered remote and relatively inaccessible even by Mongolian standards. The local Darkhad are known for their practice of Shamanism. Erdeniin Bat-Üül worked as teacher in Renchinlhümbe for several years.

== Literature ==
- M.Nyamaa, Khövsgöl aimgiin lavlakh toli, Ulaanbaatar 2001, p. 121f
