= Öndör Gongor =

Mongolian notable for having gigantism

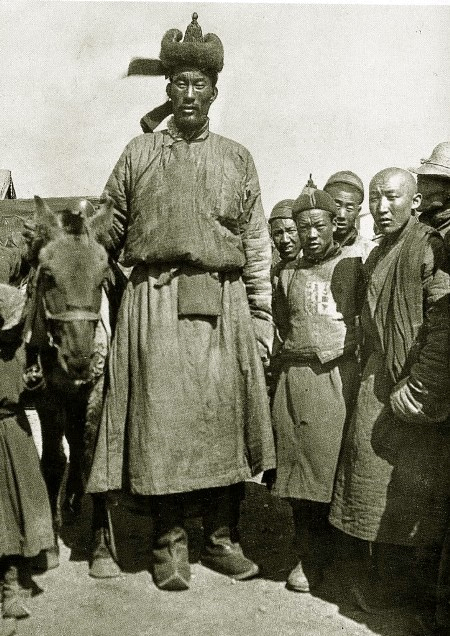
Öndör Gongor, 1922

Öndör Gongor (Mongolian: Өндөр Гонгор, "Tall Gongor", c. 1880/85 – late 1920s), whose full name was Pureviin Gongor (Mongolian: Пүрэвийн Гонгор), was a man in early-20th century Mongolia, who suffered from gigantism. He was measured 2.36 m (7 ft 9 in) high by Roy Chapman Andrews, but some other sources even give 2.45 m (8 ft). He was known all over Mongolia, and also mentioned or pictured in some accounts of contemporary western travelers.

According to an interview with his daughter G. Budkhand, published in 1997, Gongor was the third child of a herder named Pürev, who lived in the a place called Dalai Choinkhor wangiin khoshuu what is today Jargalant sum of Khövsgöl Province. He was not particularly big as a child. He only had long fingers. Because he always ate a lot, he became a bit unpopular with his parents, and eventually was sent to Ikh Khüree. One day, he was summoned to the Bogd Khan, given fresh clothes, and after a while he was even made to marry a woman who worked as one of the Bogd Khan's seamstresses on the grounds that their fates were connected at least according to a horoscope by the Bogd Khan.

There is uncertainty around what Gongor's occupation at the Bogd Khan's court was: accountant and keeper of the Bogd Khan's elephant, the Bogd Khan's bodyguard, or wrestler. In 1913, he traveled to Russia with a delegation headed by Sain Noyon Khan Namnansüren. Later, he is said to have worked at the toll office.

Gongor had four children. He died in his home area in the late 1920s, before reaching the age of 50. His corpse is said to have been stolen during the funeral – at that time, the deceased were laid out in the steppe to be devoured by birds and other animals..

One of Gongor's grandsons, D. Davaanyam, is a well-known children's author in Mongolia.
