= Gelenkhüü =

Semi-legendary figure in Mongolia

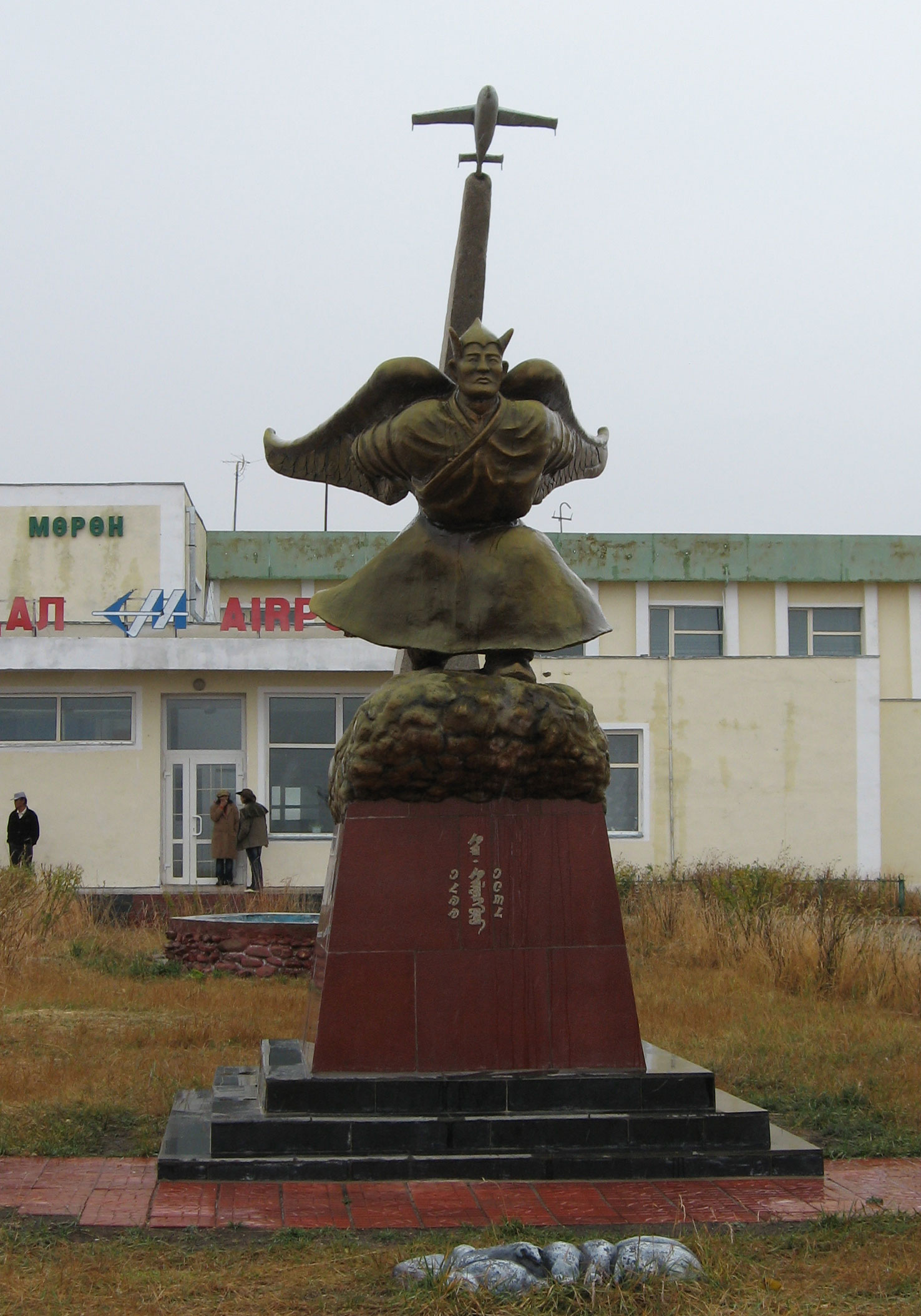
Statue of Gelenkhüü in front of Mörön's airport building

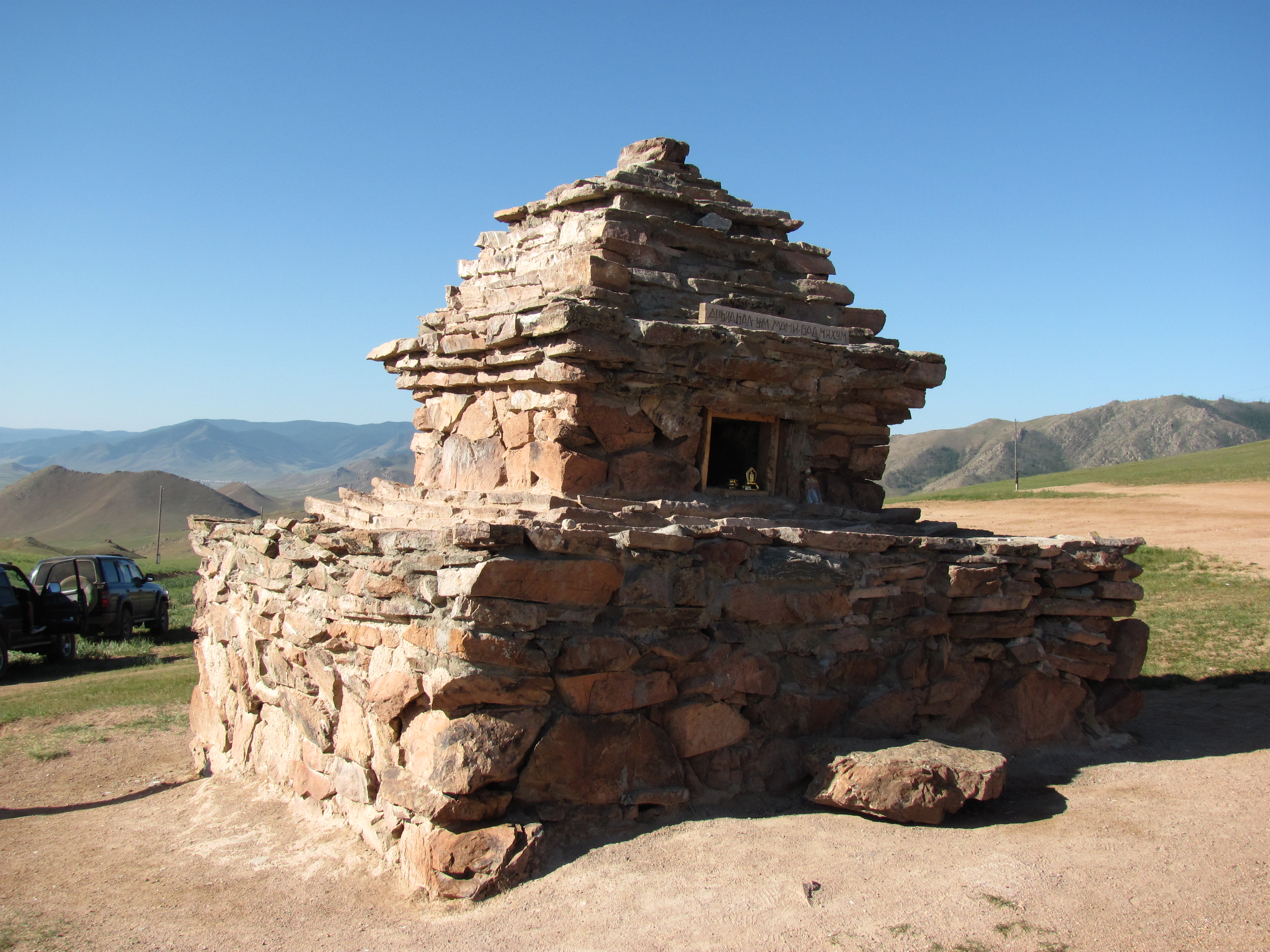
Suvarga built by Gelenkhüü in Jargalant in 1890

Gelenkhüü (Mongolian: Гэлэнхүү, c. 1877–1938), full name Khainzangiin Gelenkhüü (Хайнзангийн Гэлэнхүү), also known as Gelenkhüü Shükherch (Гэлэнхүү Шүхэрч – Parachute-Gelenkhüü), is a semi-legendary figure from northern Mongolia. There are numerous tales about him, but the deed he is most remembered for is his attempt to fly by using self-made wings.

== Early life ==
Gelenkhüü was born around 1877 in the Sain Noyon Khan Aimag's Dalai Choinkhor Khoshuu, in what belongs today to Jargalant sum in Khövsgöl aimag. He is said to have been a lively and bright kid. Spending some years as a novice in a local monastery, he seems to have developed technical and creative attempts early on. After having been expelled from the monastery for rejecting certain religious teachings, he became a herder.

== The quest for a male heir ==
Although being married and father to six daughters, Gelenkhüü's desire for a son eventually grew so strong that he left his home for two years and travelled to the Darkhad areas in northwestern Khövsgöl in order to consult the shamans living there. When he returned, he brought a female shaman as second wife. She got pregnant, but only to give birth to yet another daughter.

Being an outcast in a community both fearful and suspicious of shamanism, she left Gelenkhüü soon afterwards and returned home. Gelenkhüü, afraid of her possible revenge and evil spirits, erected a suvarga close to his home, using a white-spotted black yak to collect the building material and burning incense sticks and butter lights upon its completion.

The northward-facing suvarga still can be found some 20 km north-east of Jargalant's sum center. In the late 1920s, Gelenkhüü finally adopted a son from a local woman. As of 2000, the son lived in Mörön.

== The flight attempt ==
During the lama uprising of 1932, Gelenkhüü saw airplanes for the first time. He became so fascinated that he began to secretly make a pair of wings from sheepskin and eagle wings. He chose a 170m high cliff as the site for his first flight attempt. Fortunately he had been prudent enough to drive his sheep to the foot of the cliff before jumping into the abyss and got away unharmed.

Gelenkhüü died in 1938. A statue in his honour has been erected in front of Mörön's airport building.
