= Mörön =

Provincial capital of Khövsgöl Province, Mongolia

Mörön Мөрөн ᠮᠥᠷᠡᠨ
- District
- Mörön District; Мөрөн сум ᠮᠥᠷᠡᠨᠰᠤᠮᠤ
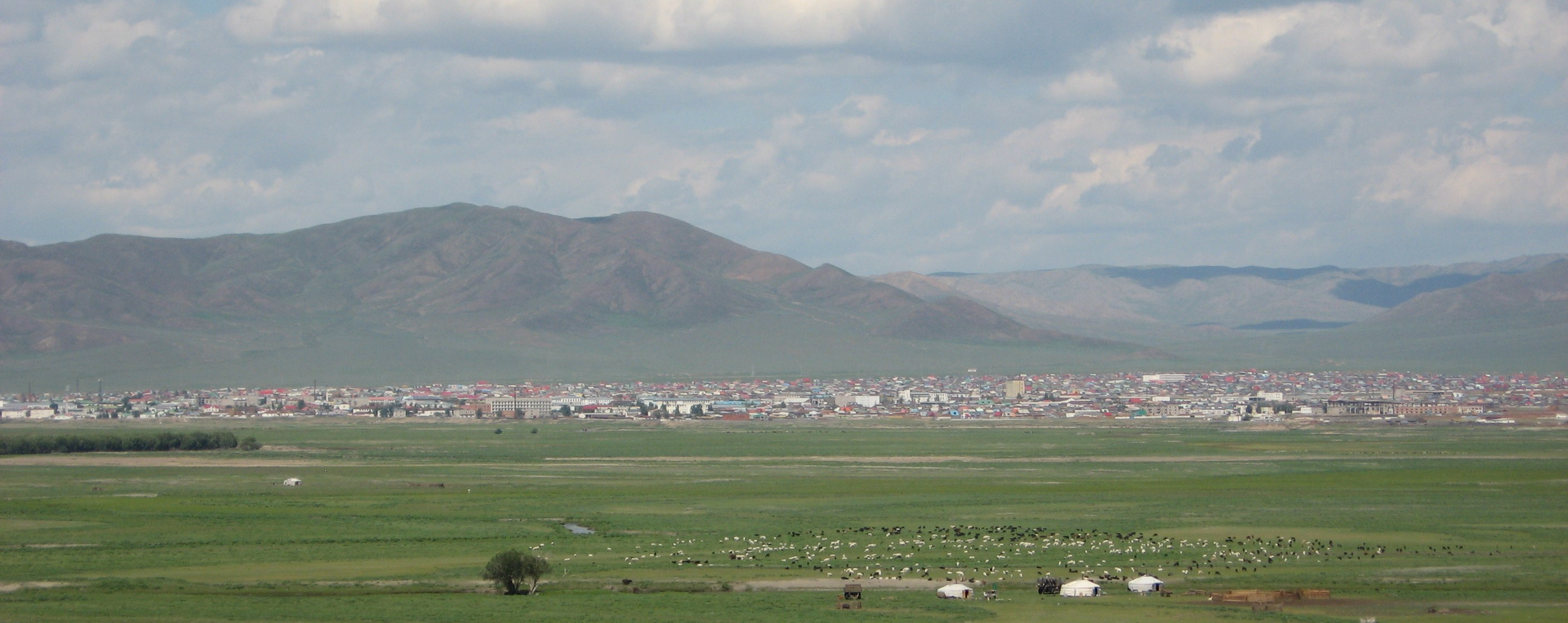
- Mörön from south, July 2008

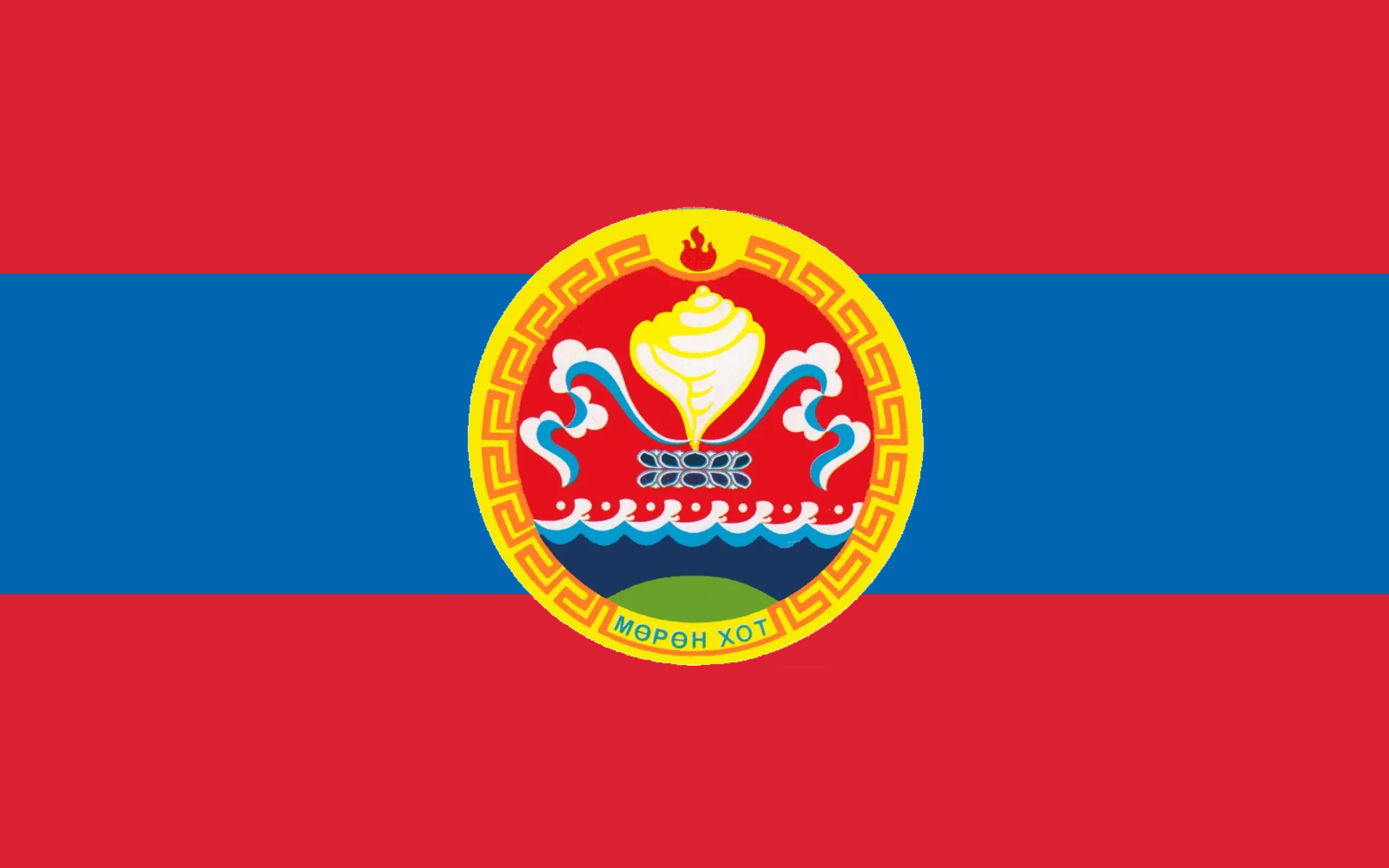
- Flag

- Location in Mongolia
- Coordinates: 49°37′56″N 100°10′07″E
- Country: Mongolia
- Province: Khövsgöl
- Settled: 1809

Area
  - District: 102.9 km^{2} (39.7 sq mi)
  - Urban: 16.04 km^{2} (6.19 sq mi)
- Elevation: 1,710 m (5,610 ft)

Population (2025)
  - District: 42,921
  - Density: 417.1/km^{2} (1,080/sq mi)
- Time zone: UTC+8
- Postal code: 210 xxx
- Area code: +976 (0)138
- License plate: ХӨ (_ variable)

Mörön (Mongolian: Мөрөн ᠮᠥᠷᠡᠨ [mɵ́rʉɴ]; lit. 'River') is the administrative center of Khövsgöl, Mongolia. Before 1933, Khatgal had been the aimag capital.

With population of 46,918, it is the fifth most-populous city in Mongolia, after Ulaanbaatar, Darhan, Erdenet and Choibalsan. In terms of administrative units, it is divided into 14 khoroo and covers approximately 102.9 km^{2}. Demographics are split as 51.58% females to 48.42% males. 41.25% of the population is aged between 15 and 39.

Although a poorly developed town, Mörön has a hospital, a museum, a theatre, a post office, nine schools and fifteen kindergartens. It was connected to the Mongolian central power grid in 2004. The town has had a paved road connecting it to Mongolia's capital city Ulaanbaatar since December 2014, as a part of a government effort to extend paved roads from Ulaanbaatar to all Aimag capitals.

== History ==
The settlement stems from the Möröngiin Khuree monastery, which had been founded in 1809/11 on the banks of the Delger mörön river. By the beginning of the 20th century, the monastery had grown to a population of about 1300 lamas but was destroyed in 1937. A small new monastery (Danzadarjaa Khiid) was erected on the western edge of the town in the 1990s.

== Population ==
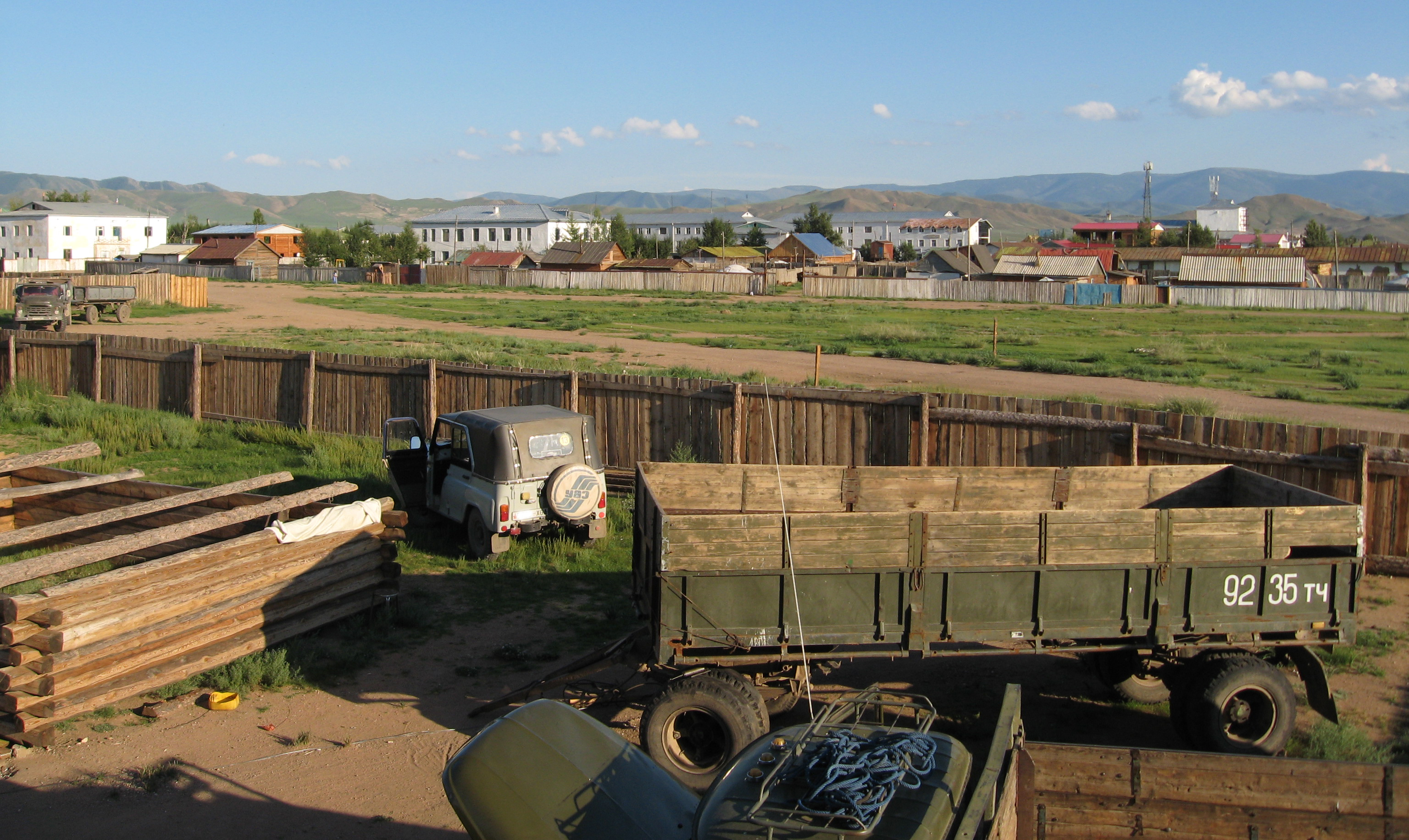
In the western part of Mörön

Mörön population
1959 est.	1969 census	1979 census	1989 census	1994 est.	2000 census	2005 est.	2007 est.	2010 census
9,000	11,200	16,500	21,300	27,230	28,147	35,872	36,082	35,789

Most of the inhabitants live in ger districts. The city has 12,286 families.

== Education ==
Mörön has 27 organizations that are working as educational institutions. There are eight national, one private high schools, thirteen national, four private kindergartens, one vocational training center, and the university. As of 2020, there were a total of 14,865 students in the city. The first school of the local was established in 1923 under the name "Suhiin tenhim". In 2000 it was renamed "Delgermurun" and remains in use until now. The two main institutions are the "Delgermurun" and "Erdmiin Dalai". "Erdmiin Dalai" that is one of the top 10 national school in Mongolia was founded in 1962 with the name "Erdem".

== Airport ==
Since 1957, the Mörön Airport (ICAO: ZMMN, IATA: MXV) has two runways, one paved 2,400m long by 42m wide, and one gravel 2,000m long. It is served by regular flights from and to Ulaanbaatar. Some flights to the western Aimags may stop over. It is a first class capacity of 150 passengers per hour.

== Climate ==
Mörön experienced a continental semi-arid climate (Köppen BSk, Trewartha BSbc) with a humid continental temperature regime (Dwb) (formerly subarctic (Dwc) based upon the 1991 to 2020 reference period resulting in long, very dry, frigid winters and short, warm summers.

Climate data for Mörön, elevation 1,283 m (4,209 ft), (1991–2020 normals, extremes 1941–present)
Month	Jan	Feb	Mar	Apr	May	Jun	Jul	Aug	Sep	Oct	Nov	Dec	Year
Record high °C (°F)	4.5 (40.1)	10.7 (51.3)	18.7 (65.7)	28.9 (84.0)	32.5 (90.5)	35.4 (95.7)	37.4 (99.3)	36.9 (98.4)	31.8 (89.2)	23.6 (74.5)	13.4 (56.1)	9.6 (49.3)	37.4 (99.3)
Mean daily maximum °C (°F)	−14.7 (5.5)	−7.6 (18.3)	2.9 (37.2)	11.9 (53.4)	18.3 (64.9)	24.4 (75.9)	25.9 (78.6)	23.7 (74.7)	17.8 (64.0)	9.0 (48.2)	−3.4 (25.9)	−11.6 (11.1)	8.0 (46.5)
Daily mean °C (°F)	−22.1 (−7.8)	−16.1 (3.0)	−5.6 (21.9)	3.9 (39.0)	10.9 (51.6)	16.7 (62.1)	18.7 (65.7)	16.2 (61.2)	9.5 (49.1)	0.7 (33.3)	−9.9 (14.2)	−18.5 (−1.3)	0.4 (32.7)
Mean daily minimum °C (°F)	−27.3 (−17.1)	−22.3 (−8.1)	−12.2 (10.0)	−3.2 (26.2)	2.8 (37.0)	10.1 (50.2)	12.7 (54.9)	10.2 (50.4)	2.5 (36.5)	−5.6 (21.9)	−15.4 (4.3)	−23.2 (−9.8)	−5.9 (21.4)
Record low °C (°F)	−47.2 (−53.0)	−44.3 (−47.7)	−36.1 (−33.0)	−22.3 (−8.1)	−15.0 (5.0)	−5.9 (21.4)	1.4 (34.5)	−3.0 (26.6)	−12.7 (9.1)	−27.3 (−17.1)	−37.9 (−36.2)	−45.8 (−50.4)	−47.2 (−53.0)
Average precipitation mm (inches)	1.5 (0.06)	1.3 (0.05)	1.7 (0.07)	8.0 (0.31)	17.4 (0.69)	43.9 (1.73)	75.3 (2.96)	58.0 (2.28)	20.5 (0.81)	7.2 (0.28)	2.9 (0.11)	3.3 (0.13)	241.1 (9.49)
Average precipitation days (≥ 1.0 mm)	1.4	1.2	1.2	2.3	3.1	7.4	10.4	8.6	3.9	2.1	1.9	1.5	45.1
Average relative humidity (%)	73.5	69.3	61.6	47.5	46.3	55.9	60.1	58.0	53.9	55.0	64.5	71.1	59.7
Mean monthly sunshine hours	155.4	191.7	261.9	267.3	307.8	300.1	291.5	281.0	256.3	228.6	157.9	129.9	2,829.6
Source 1: NOAA Starlings Roost Weather
Source 2: Meteo Climat (record highs and lows)

== Notable buildings ==
- There were 60 temples and monasteries in Mörön at the end of the 19th century. Möröngiin Chüree Khiid Monastery in which about 2,500 monks were living was the most important one. It was famous for its Tsam dances. In 1937, however, the monasteries and temples of Mörön were all destroyed by order of the then president Khorloogiin Choibalsan, like everywhere in Mongolia. Danzadardscha Khiid, a small new monastery, was built in a traditional style in the western part of Mörön in June 1990, and 40 monks are living there. Several stupas and a tall Buddha statue were also built around it.
- The municipal theatre and the post office are on the southern and southwestern edges of the large Central Square. Opposite, the Town Hall which was built in a typical socialist style, is worth a look as well. In the middle of the square, an equestrian statue was erected as a monument for Chingunjav, the leader of a local rebellion against the Qing dynasty, in 2010. This statue replaced an older monument for Davaadorj (see below).
- The monument for Davaadorj, a Mongolian border guard from Khövsgöl who was killed in a skirmish on the Khovd/Xinjiang border in 1948, has been moved to the compound of the border troops, around 300 m northeast of the Central Square.
- Another sightworthy memorial was erected in front of the airport: Khainzangiin Gelenkhüü (Хайнзангийн Гэлэнхүү; 1870–1938), a Buddhist monk who tried to fly with wings made of sheep leather near the town of Jargalant in the 1930s.
- The Aimag Museum, founded in 1949, is halfway between Central Square and the Wrestlers' Stadium. It shows about 4000 objects, e.g., are traditional clothes and other items of minorities living in Khövsgöl Aimag.
- The Wrestlers' Stadium is an interesting modern building in the eastern part of the town. In front of it, a memorial was erected to honour three famous wrestlers stemming from Mörön. A special park for children was laid out opposite the stadium.
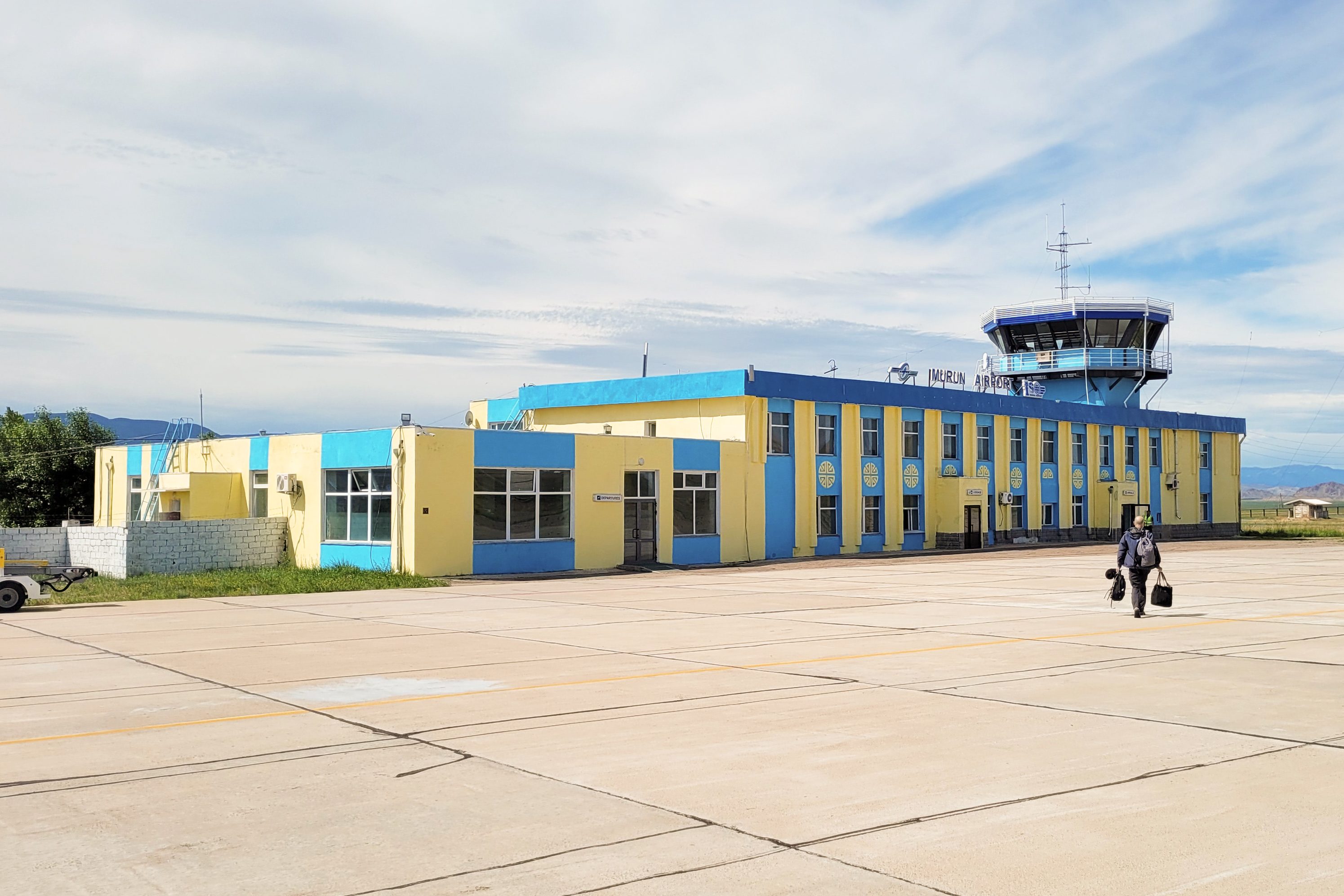
Airport

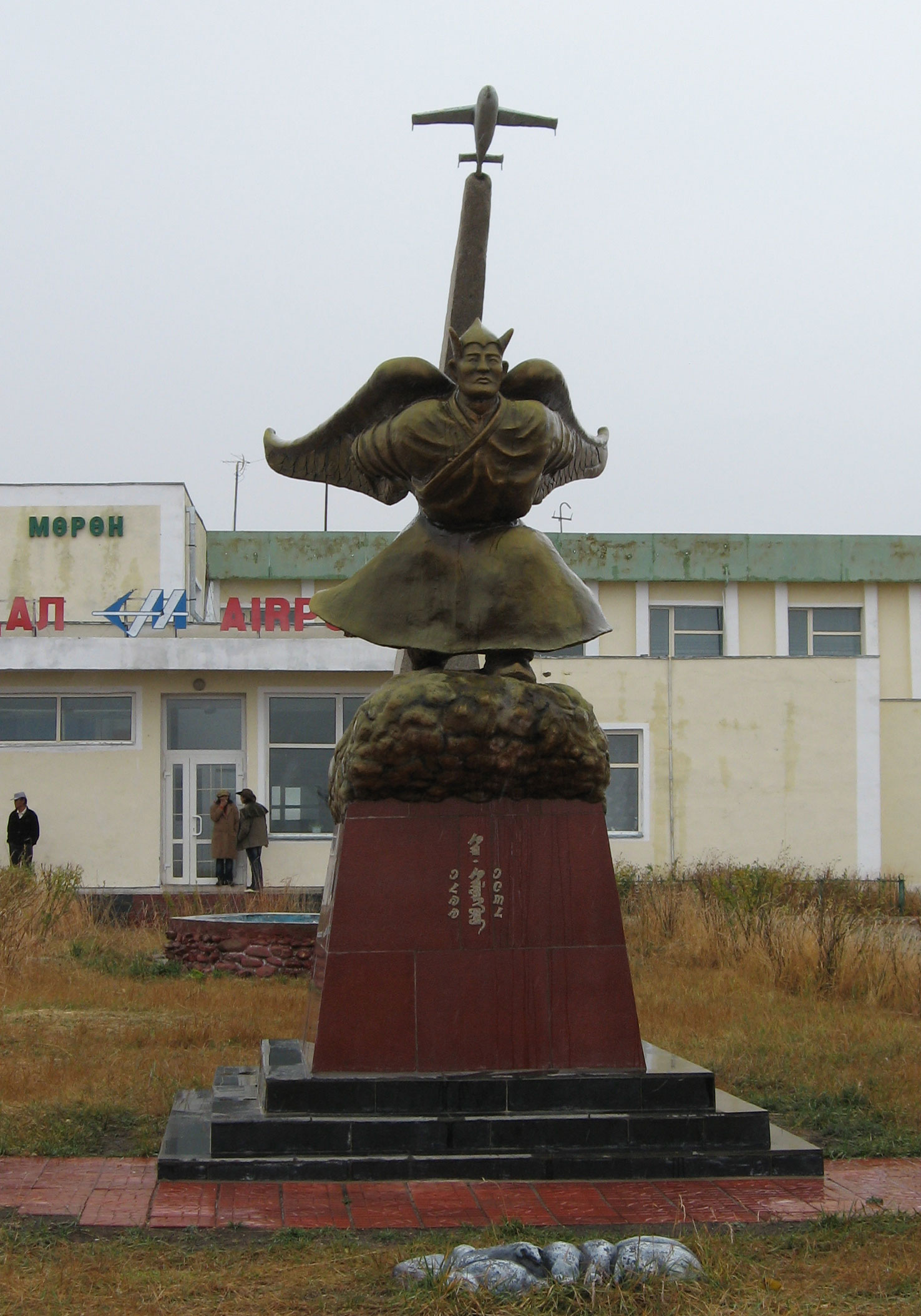
Gelenkhüü Memorial in front of the airport

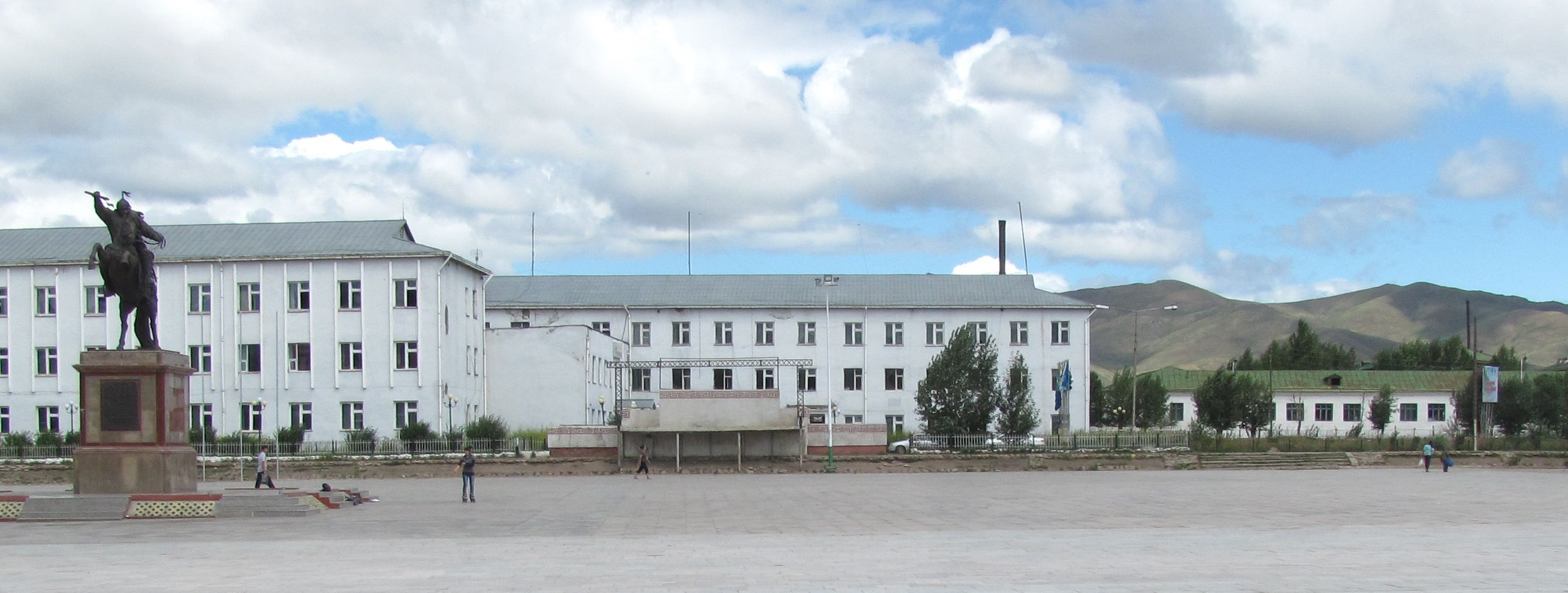
Central Square with Chingunjav Memorial

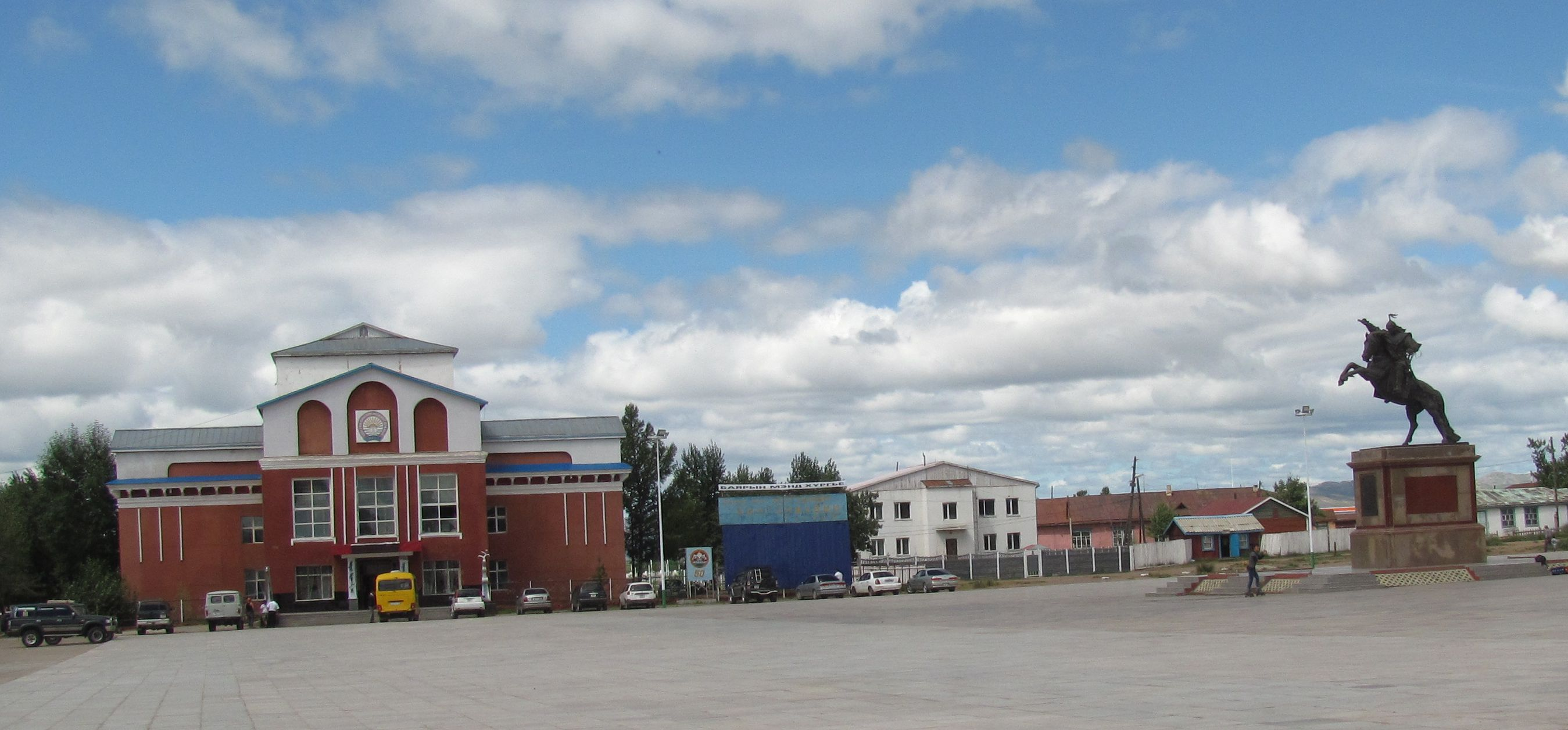
Museum

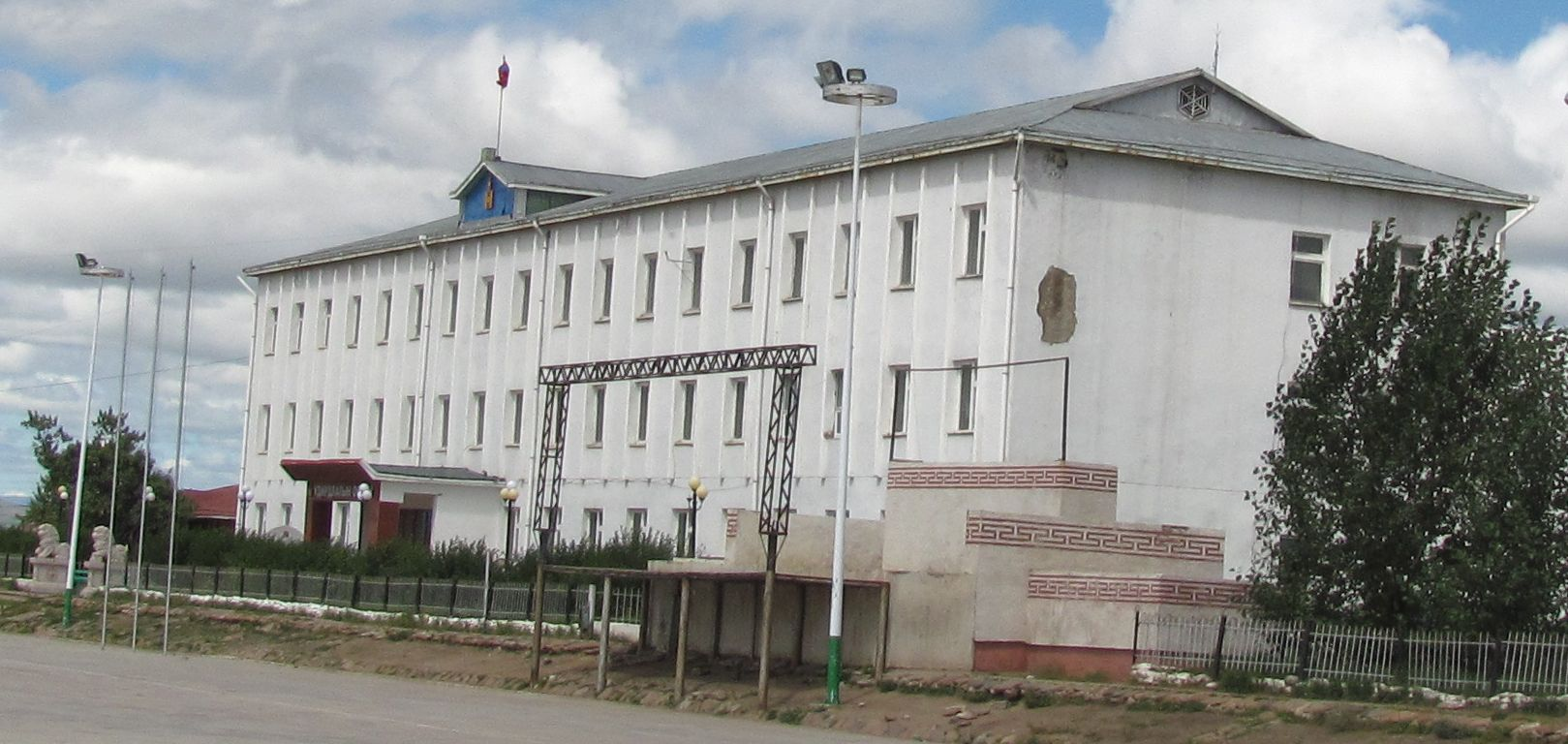
Town Hall

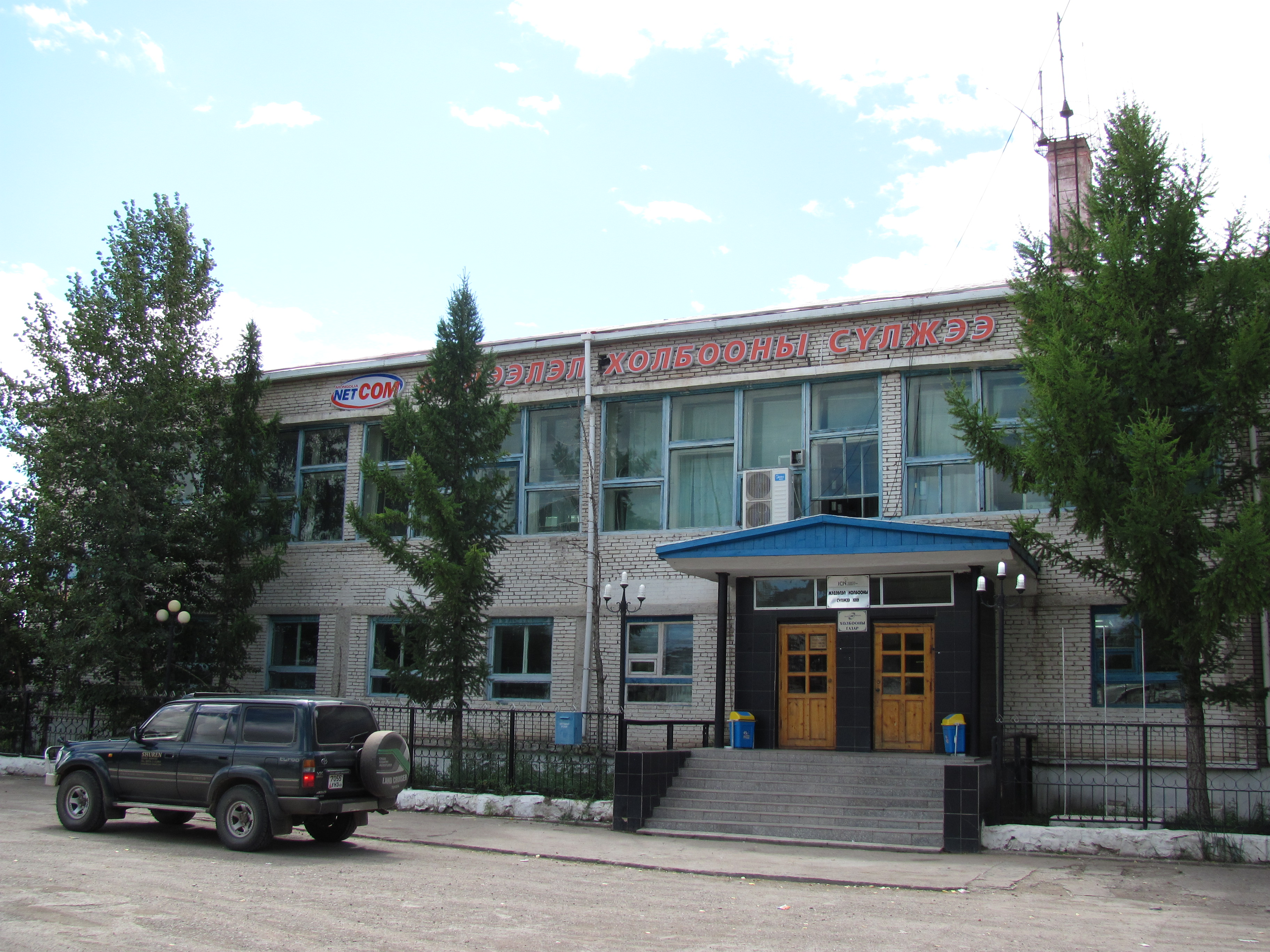
Post Office

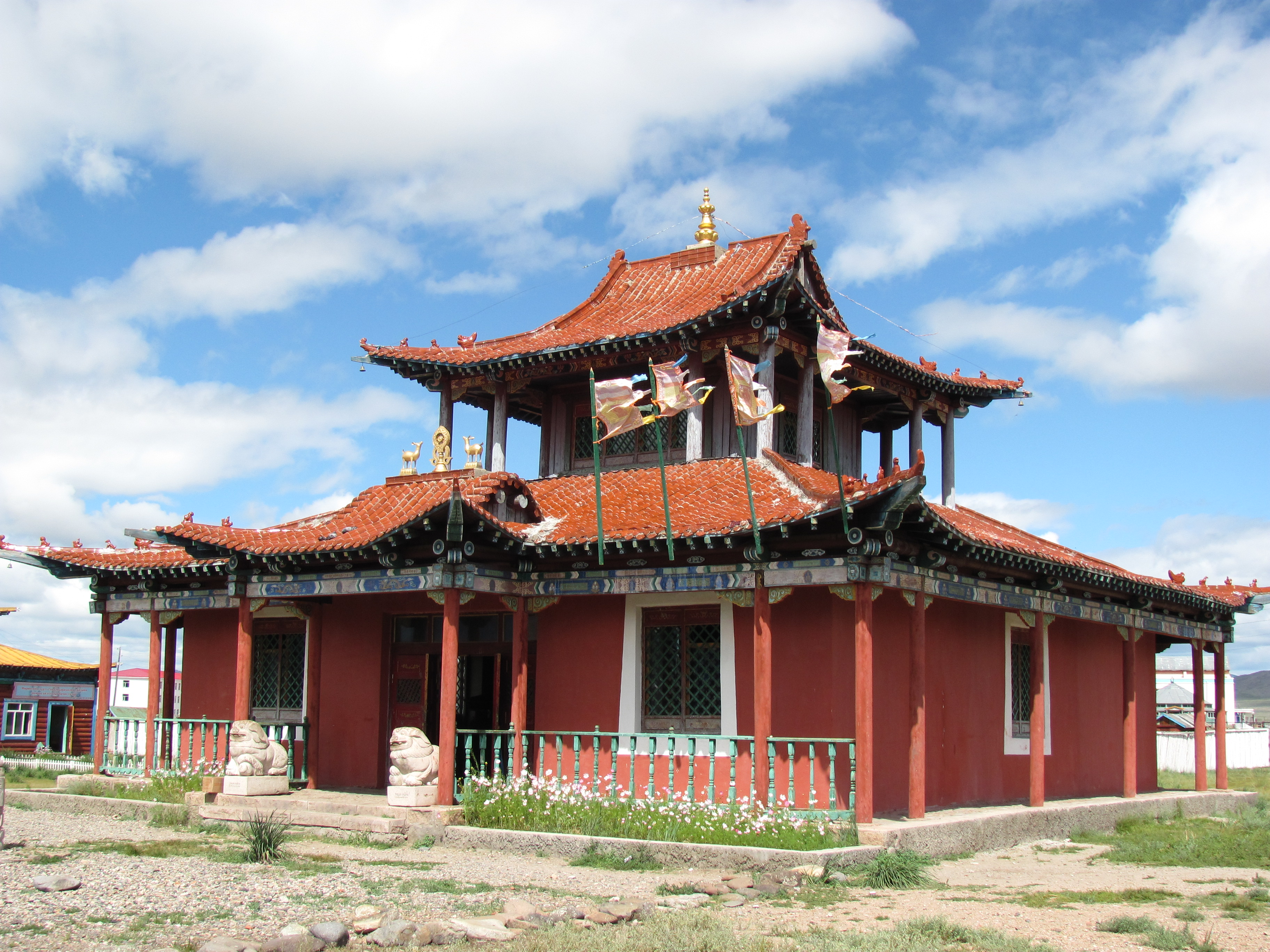
Danzadardscha Khiid Monastery

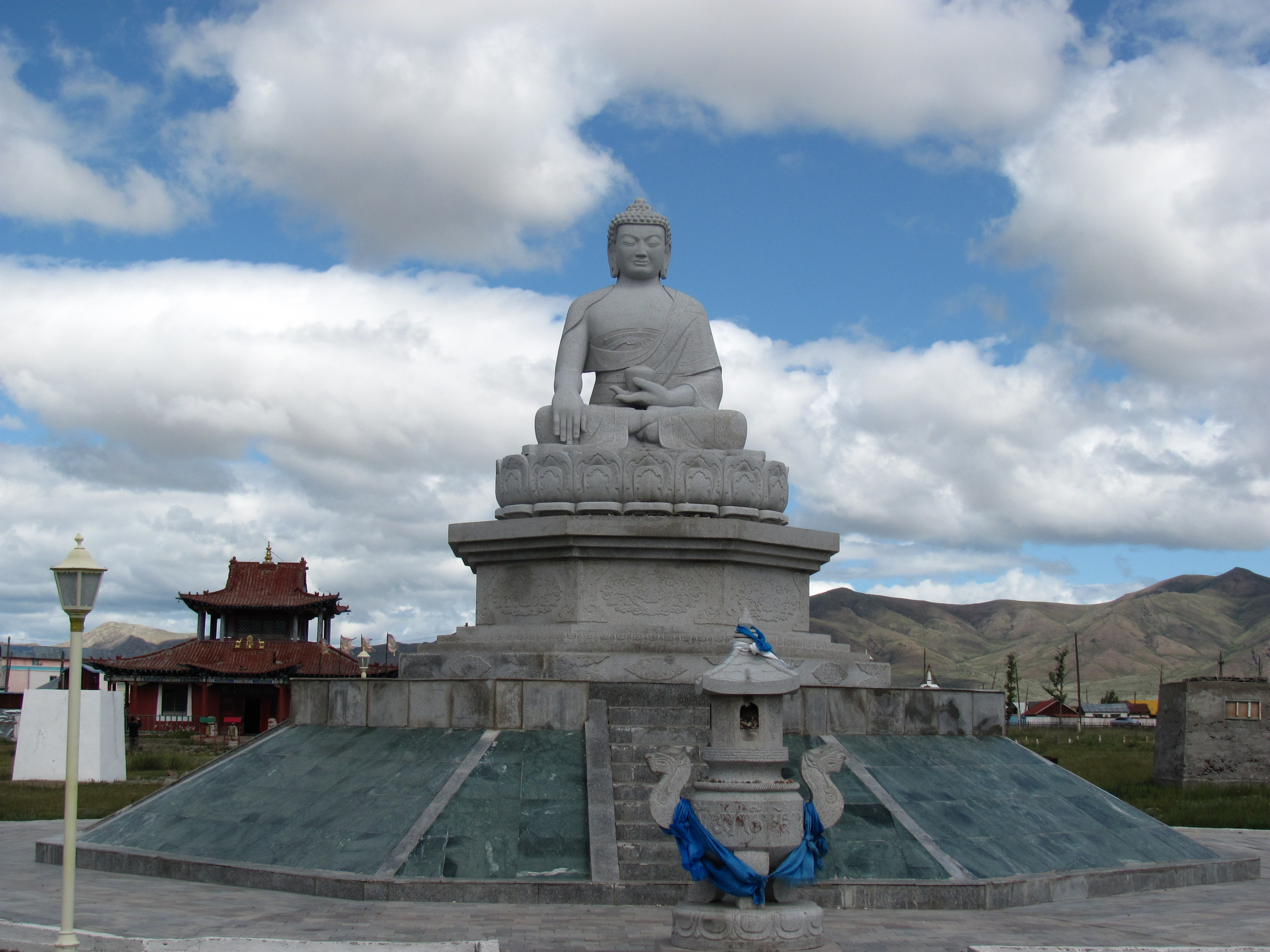
Buddha statue at the monastery

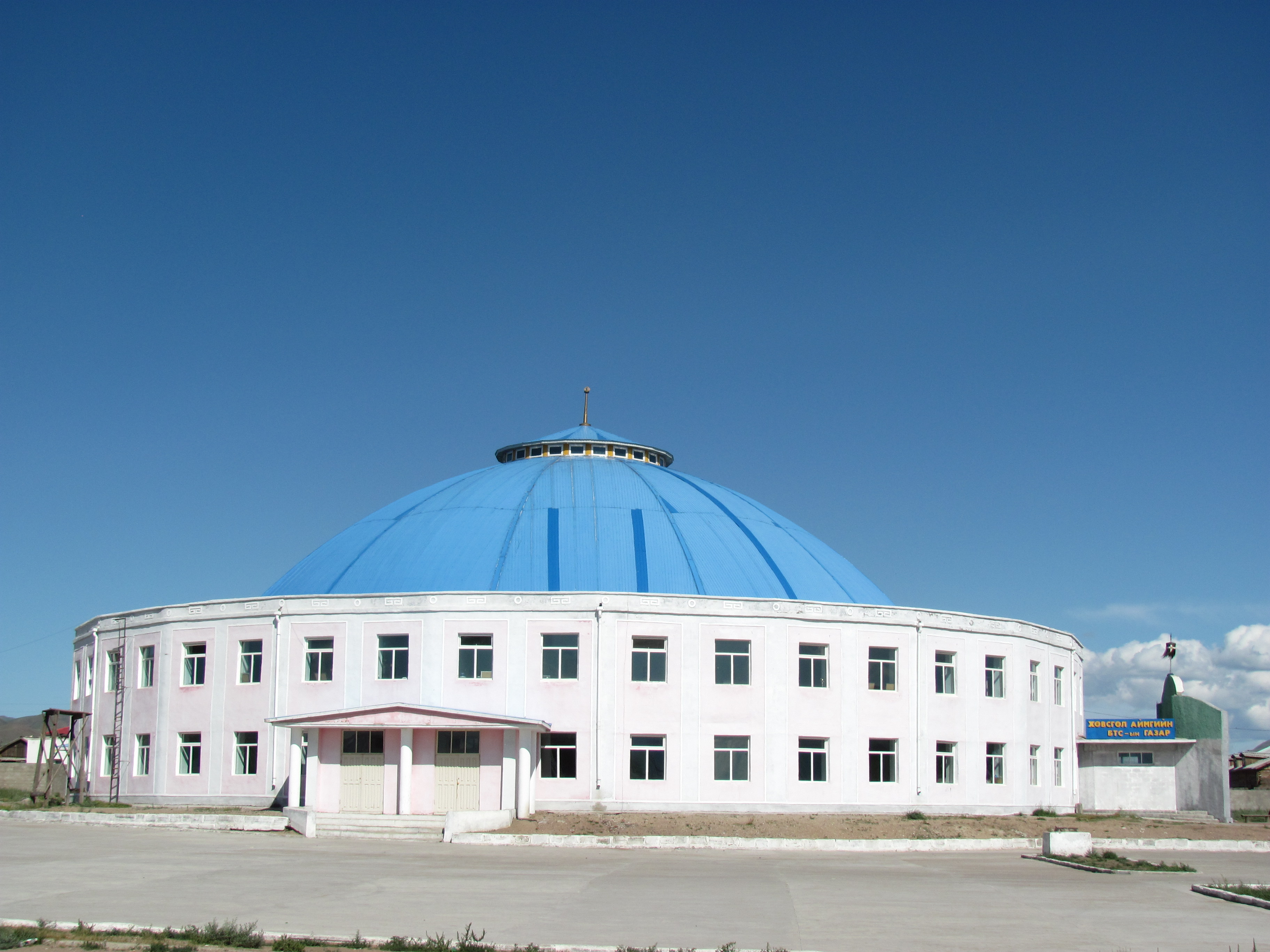
Wrestlers' Stadium

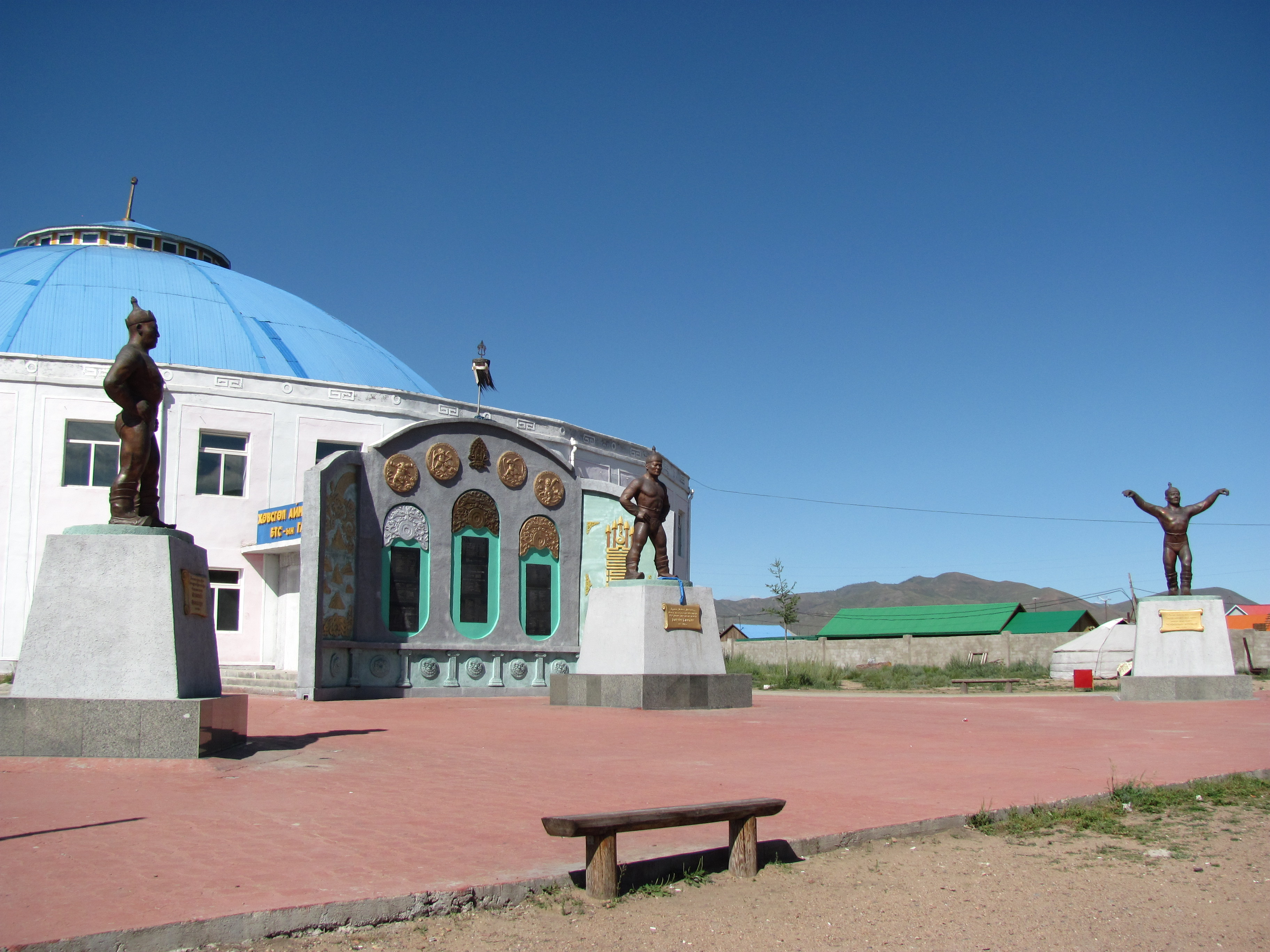
Wrestlers' Memorial

== Museum ==
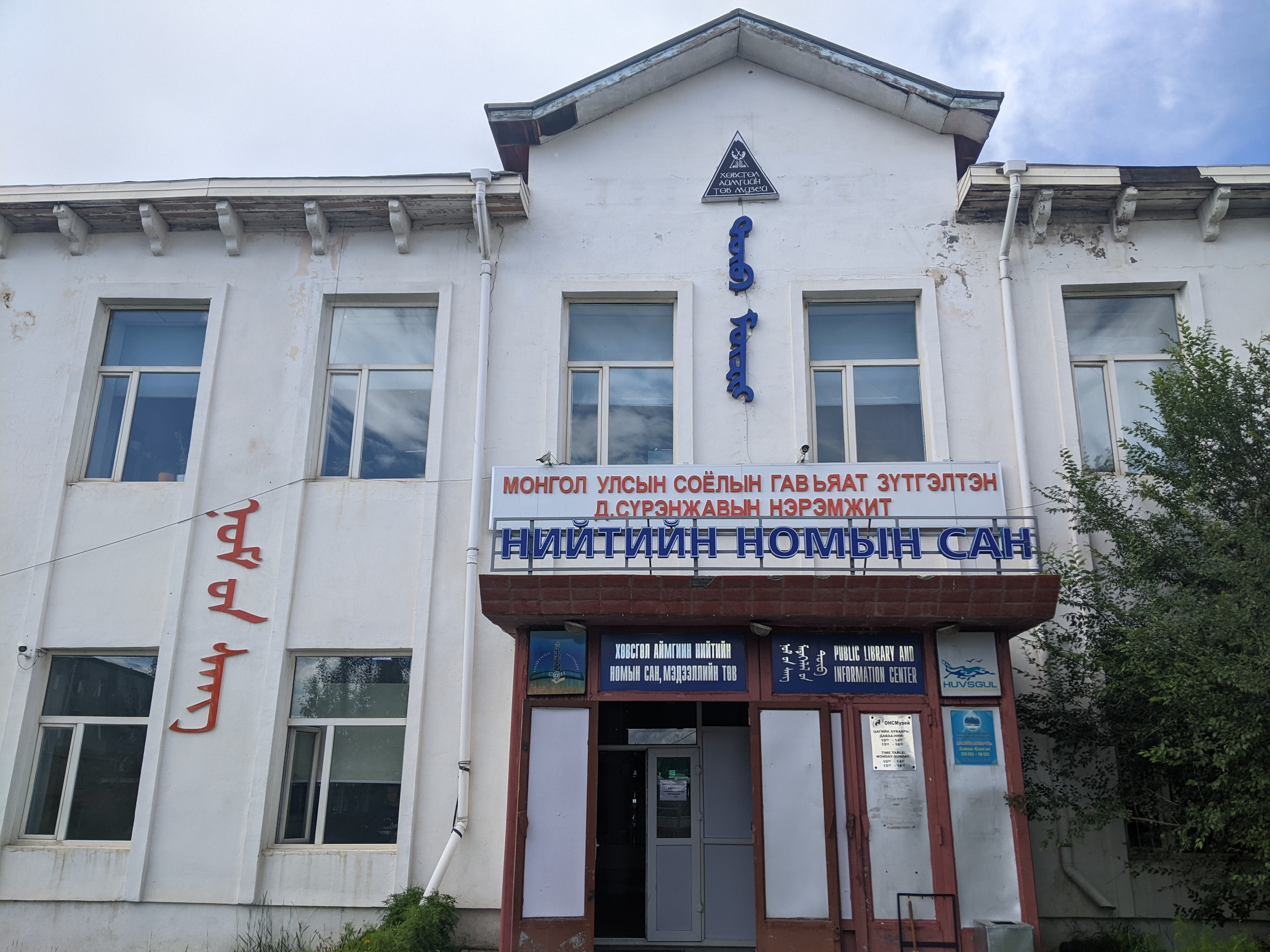
Museum of Khövsgöl Province

The first department to explore the local area was established in 1949 in order to have historical and ethnographic exhibits. As a result of the collection of antique books and geological samples, the first building foundations were laid to explore the local area. In 1967, it eventually became the Museum of Khövsgöl Province to research the local area and grew the collection to include approximately 1000 exhibits and artifacts. In 1987, a zoo was constructed and opened its doors next to the museum. The zoo showed people wild animals, birds, and local breeds of livestock. In 2010, the museum was reorganized and currently Khövsgöl province's local history museum operates with 13 employees, 3 halls, consisting of 3693 exhibits and artifacts from 1860 locations. In the museum, rare and valuable exhibits are included. For instance, 108 tomes of Ganjuur (also known as Kanjur) scripture, mammoth tusks, a meteor that weighs about 52.5 kilograms, as well as a flint gun and sword of Chingunjav who was the Khalkha prince ruler of the Khotogoid among other historical and ethnographic artifacts.
