= Museum of Khövsgöl Province =

Museum in Mörön, Khövsgöl, Mongolia

- Хөвсгөл аймгийн төв музей
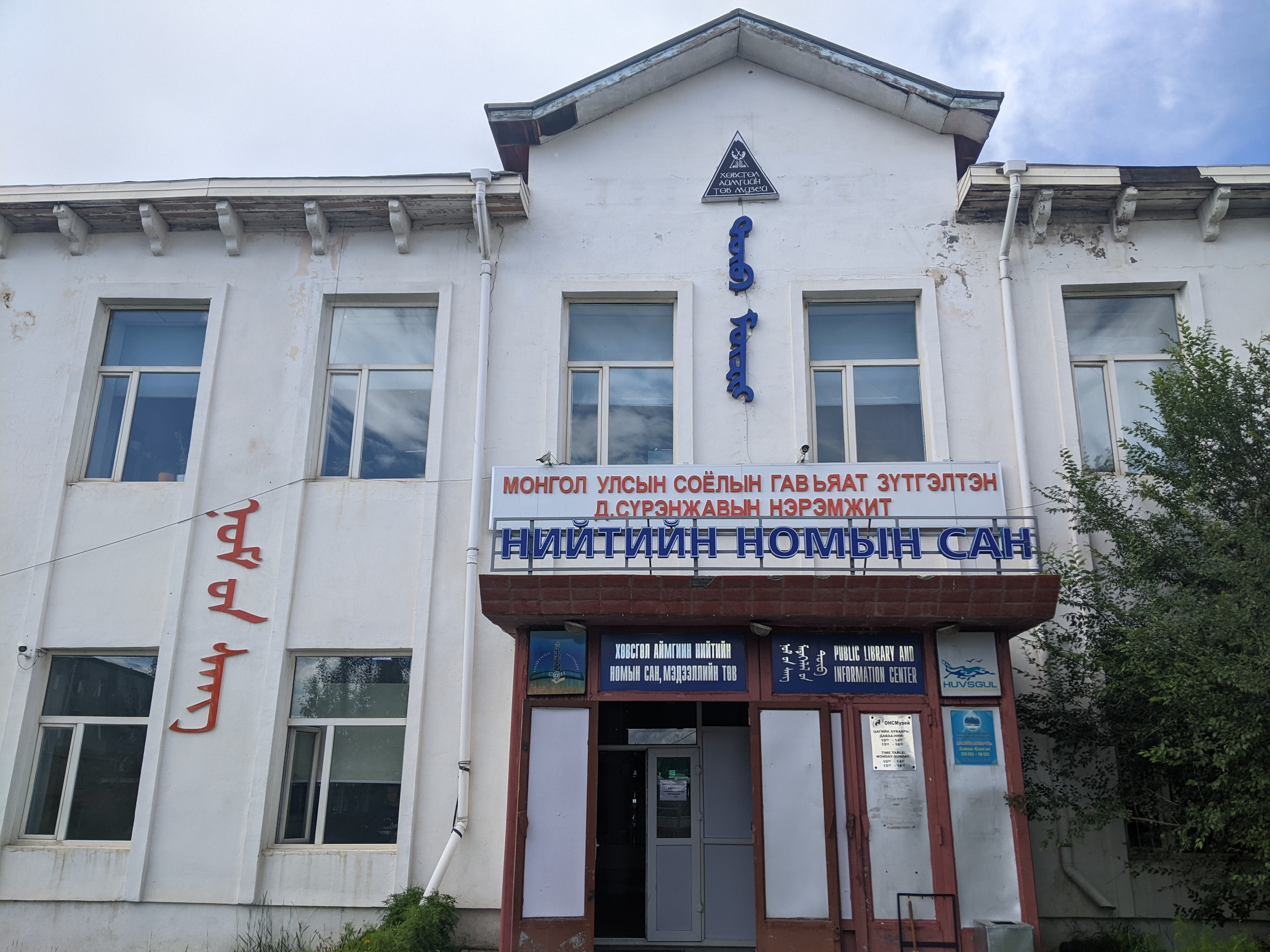
- Established: 1967
- Location: Mörön, Khövsgöl, Mongolia
- Coordinates: 49°38′14.8″N 100°09′44.2″E
- Type: museum

The Museum of Khövsgöl Province (Mongolian: Хөвсгөл аймгийн төв музей) is a museum in Mörön, Khövsgöl Province, Mongolia.

== History ==
The museum was originally established as a study room for local history in 1949. In 1967, it was upgraded into a museum.

== Exhibitions ==
The museum displays various types of stuffed wild animals.

== See also ==
- List of museums in Mongolia
