= Jargalant, Khövsgöl =

District in Khövsgöl Province, Mongolia

Coordinates: 48°35′N 99°21′E

Jargalant District Жаргалант сум ᠵᠢᠷᠭᠠᠯᠠᠩᠲᠤᠰᠤᠮᠤ
- Sum
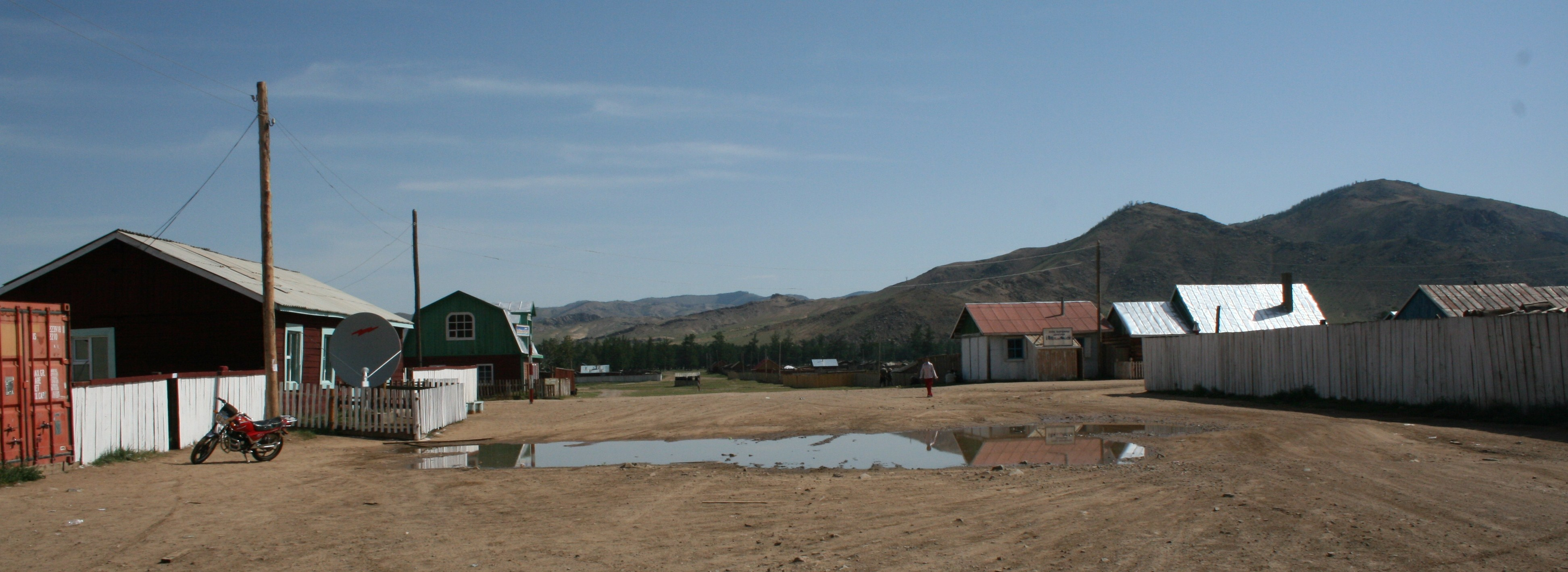
- In the sum center

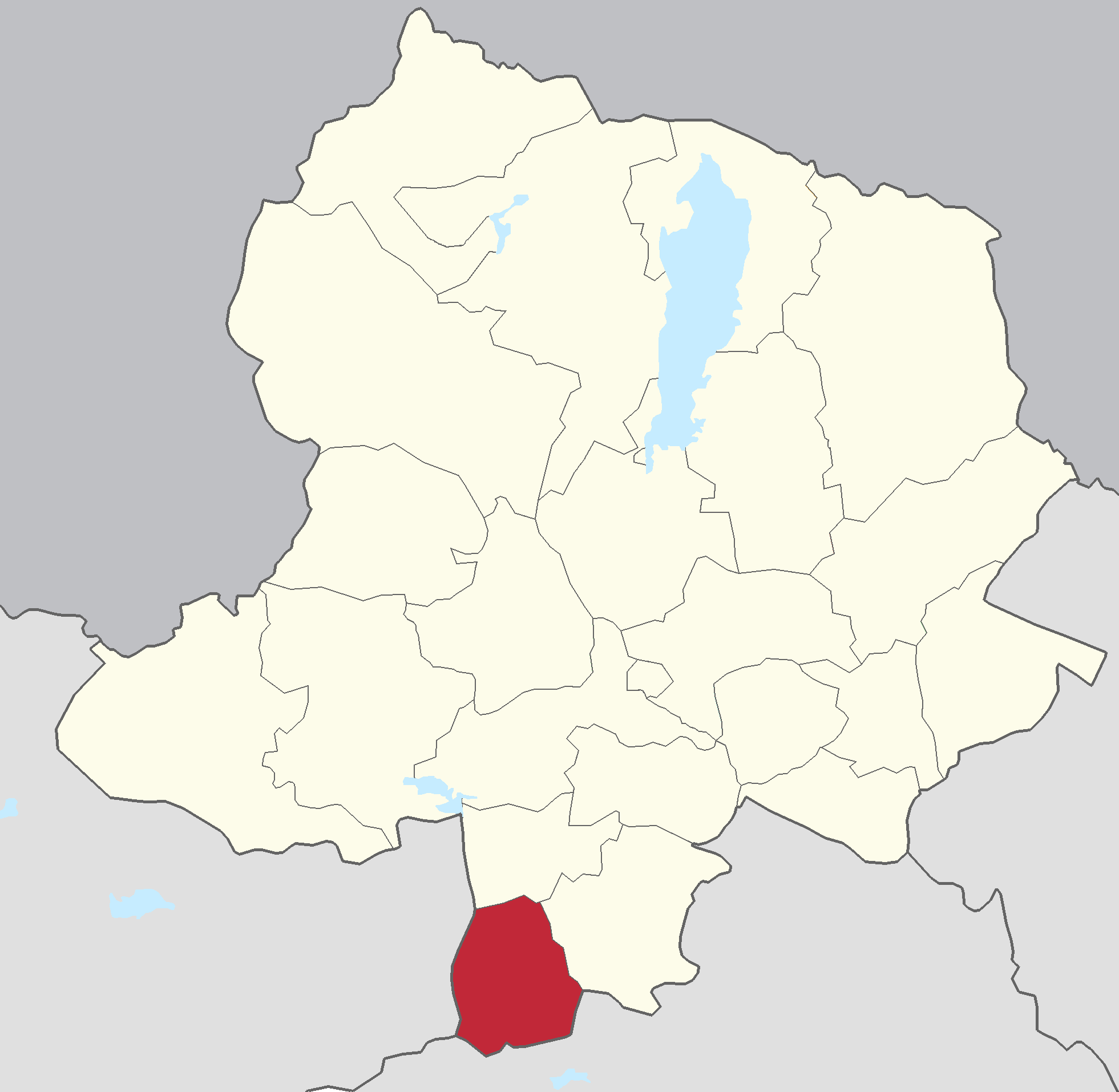
- Jargalant District in Khövsgöl Province
- Country: Mongolia
- Province: Khövsgöl Province
- Time zone: UTC+8 (UTC + 8)

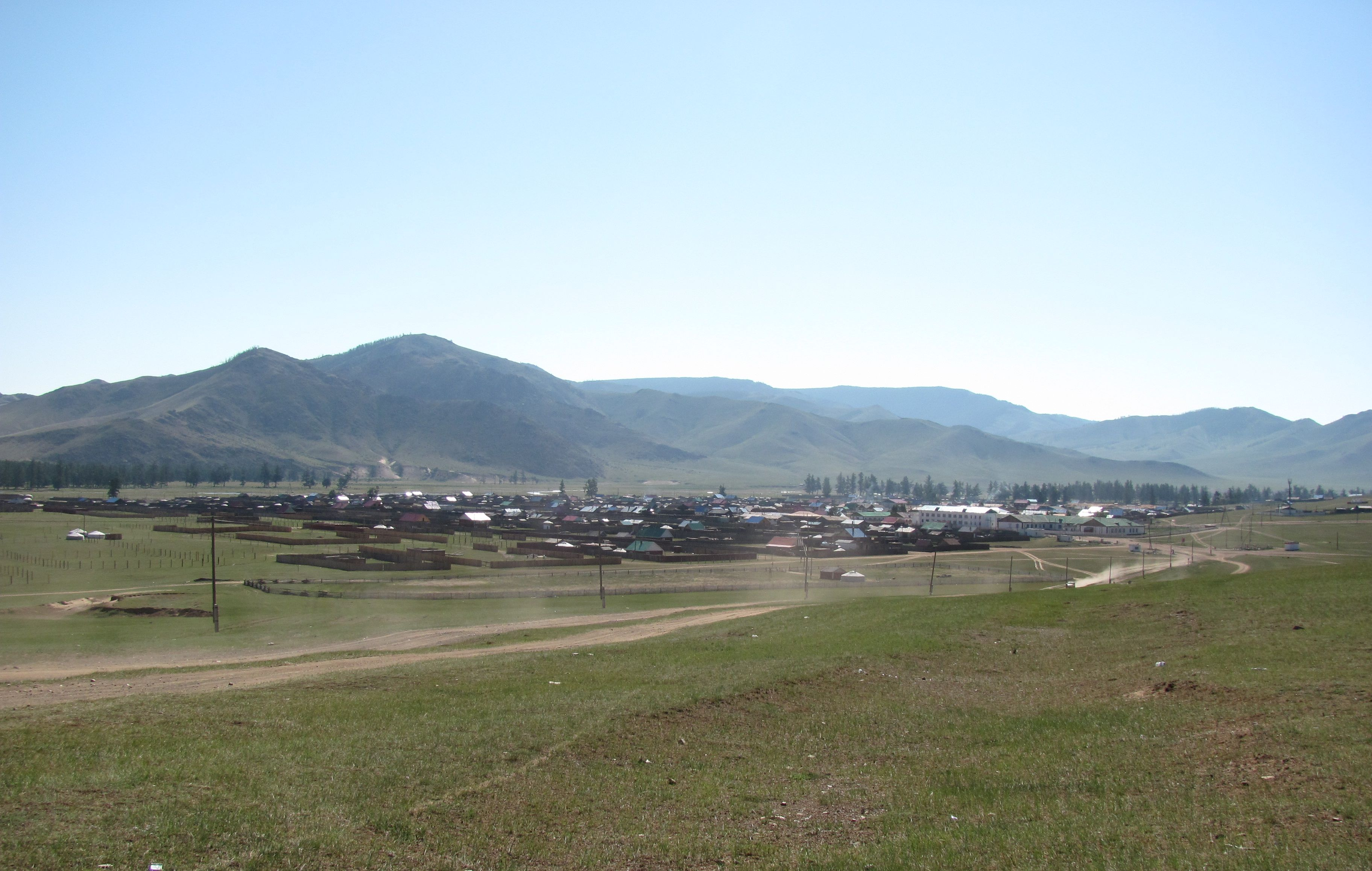
General view of Jargalant Town

Jargalant (Mongolian: Жаргалант, lit. 'happiness') is a sum (district) of Khövsgöl Province in Mongolia. The sum's area is about 2,550 km^{2} (980 sq mi), of which 1,470 km^{2} (570 sq mi) are pasture. In 2000, the sum had 5,068 inhabitants, mainly Khalkha. The center, officially named Orgil (Mongolian: Оргил), is situated close to the Ider river, 182 kilometres (113 mi) south-southeast of Mörön and 886 kilometres (551 mi) from Ulaanbaatar.

== History ==
The Jargalant sum was founded in 1931 as part of Arkhangai Province, under the name Ikh Jargalant. In 1933, it had about 2,700 inhabitants in 727 households, and about 66,000 heads of livestock. In 1941, it became part of Khövsgöl Province. In 1956, it was united with Shine-Ider sum, but became separated again in 1959. In 1973, the Büren and Bürenkhaan sums were joined to Bürentogtokh sum. The local negdel, named Ulaan Tug, was founded in 1951.

== Administrative divisions ==
The district is divided into five bags, which are:

- Khargana
- Khunjil
- Orgil
- Tsagaan Burgas
- Tsetsuukh

== Economy ==
In 2004, there were roughly 82,000 heads of livestock, consisting of 37,000 sheep, 34,000 goats, 6,100 cattle and yaks, 5,100 horses, and 20 camels.

== Features ==
The sum features one of the very few surviving pre-1990 lamaist structures in Khövsgöl Province, Jargalantyn Dugan (temple) dating from 1890. Gelenkhüü's suvarga is located 20 km north of the sum center. It was built in 1890 and has been renovated several times. There is a museum displaying various religious items, stuffed animals, and old photos as well.

There is a sightworthy wooden bridge near Jargalant built in 1940. Construction on a new bridge was begun in 2011.

There are three hotels in and around Jargalant Town.

Both Gelenkhüü and Öndör Gongor hail from Jargalant.

== Literature ==
M.Nyamaa, Khövsgöl aimgiin lavlakh toli, Ulaanbaatar 2001, p. 85f
