= Lün =

District in Töv, Mongolia

Coordinates: 47°51′57″N 105°15′16″E

Lün District Лүн сум ᠯᠦᠩᠰᠤᠮᠤ
- District
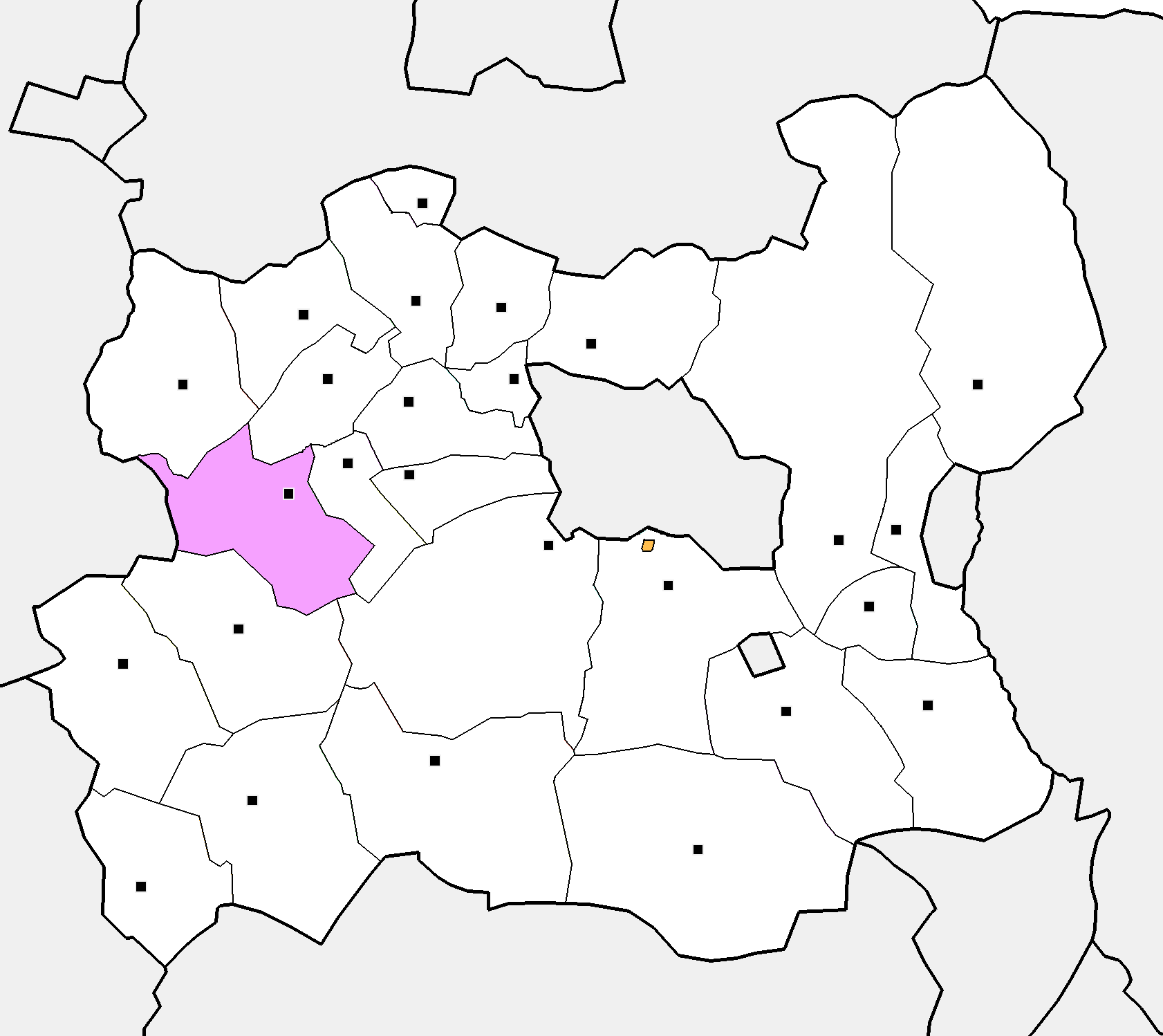
- Country: Mongolia
- Province: Töv Province

Area
  - Total: 2,929 km^{2} (1,131 sq mi)

Population (2021)
  - Total: 2,581
  - Density: 0.8812/km^{2} (2.282/sq mi)
- Time zone: UTC+8 (UTC + 8)

Lün (Mongolian: Лүн) is a district (sum) in the western part of Töv Province in Mongolia. The Tuul River passes just west of the sum center. As of 2021, the district has a population of 2,581 residents. Within Töv Province, Lün ranks 18th in population and 12th in total land area.

== History ==
Lün was established in 1924. The area was known as Mergen Altgantai and belonged to the old Tüsheet Khan Province.

== Geography ==
Lün has a total area of 2,929 km^{2}. It is located 135 km west of the national capital Ulaanbaatar. It shares borders with the Töv Province districts of Altanbulag, Öndörshireet, Zaamar, Ugtaal, Bayankhangai, and Erdenesant, as well as Bayannuur district in Bulgan Province. The landscape is made out of steppe, hills, and mountains. It sits at an elevation between 1,500 and 1,700 meters above sea level. The region is seismically active, with a registered earthquake intensity potential of 7 on the MSK-64 scale.

The climate of this region is dry and harsh. The average temperature in January drops down to -26.3 °C (-15.3 °F), while the average temperate in July reaches +20.4 °C (+68.7 °F). Annually, the area receives between 250 and 350 mm of rain and snow, with average wind speed that ranges from 4 to 6 meters per second.

== Economy ==
The town center primarily serves as an administrative, agricultural, and service hub. The local economy relies heavily on animal husbandry, with 44 herding families and 84 families that own livestock making up 66% of the district’s total households. The district manages a total of 264,787 head of livestock, which includes 137,446 sheep, 79,870 goats, 14,616 horses, 9,349 cattle, and 405 camels.

Crop farming is conducted on 580.3 hectares of land annually. The land zoning of the district includes 478.6 hectares of public spaces, 387.5 hectares for green zones and tourism, 4 hectares for industrial use, and 246,626.362 hectares for agricultural purposes.

== Administrative divisions ==
The district is divided into three bags, which are:

- Tsagaan-Uul
- Töv
- Ögöömör

== Geology ==
- Korea–Mongolia Greenbelt Project

== Notable natives and residents ==
- Danzandarjaagiin Sereeter, a Mongolian wrestler
- Daramyn Tömör-Ochir, a Mongolian politician
