= Hustai National Park =

National park in Töv, Mongolia

Coordinates: 47°45′54″N 105°52′42″E

- IUCN category II (national park)
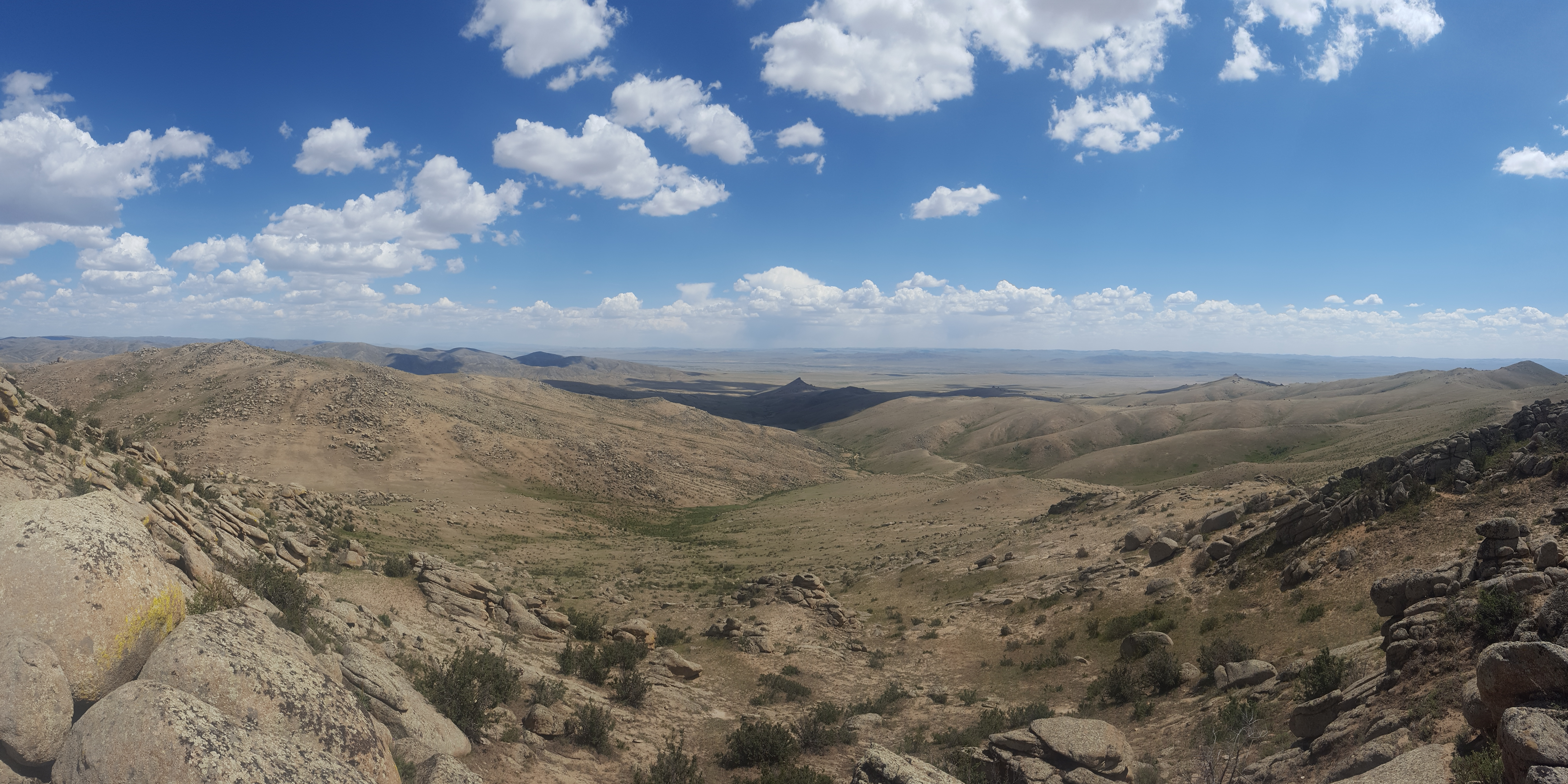
- Panoramic view

- Location within Mongolia
- Location: Töv Province, Mongolia
- Area: 506 km^{2} (195 sq mi)
- Established: 2003
- Governing body: Hustai National Park Trust
- Website: http://www.hustai.mn/language/en/

Hustai National Park (Mongolian: Хустайн байгалийн цогцолборт газар), located in the Khustai Mountains of Töv Province, is a national park of Mongolia. It is also known as Khustain Nuruu National Park. It covers an area of 506 km^{2} (195 sq mi). The Tuul River runs through the park.

== History ==
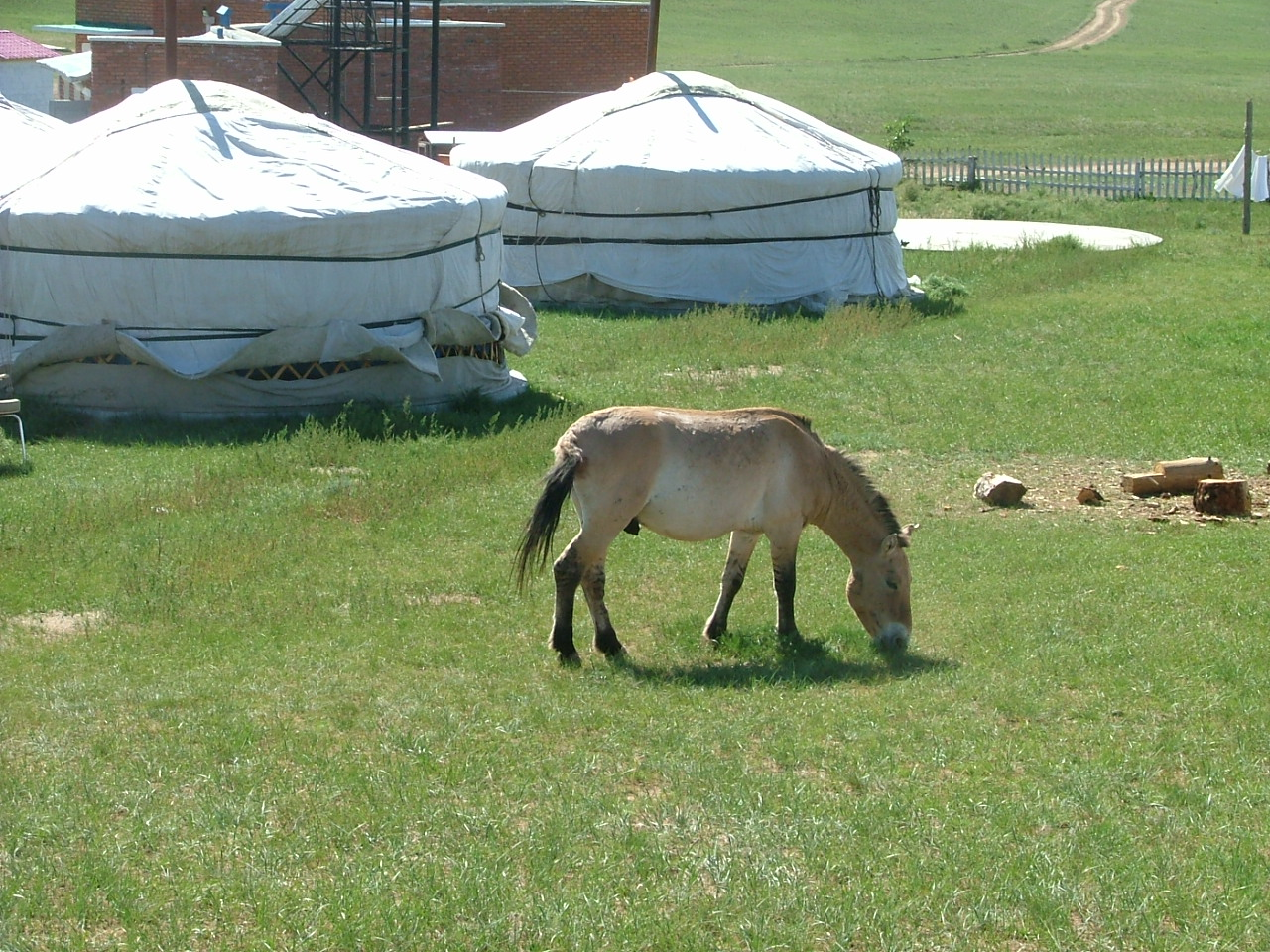
A Przewalski's horse

The Mongolian Government declared Hustai National Park as a Specially Protected Area in 1993, one year after the initiation of the reintroduction project of the Takhi (Przewalski's horse) to the Hustain Nuruu. The HNP extends through the Khentii Mountains and includes the western edge of the Mongolian steppe at the boundaries of Altanbulag, Argalant and Bayankhangai Soums of Töv Province. The park is about 100 km from the capital city of Ulaanbaatar to the west.

In 2002, the Man and the Biosphere Reserves organization of UNESCO certified the HNP as a member of the world biosphere network of natural reserves. The HNPT was enrolled as a member of IUCN in 2007.

== Wildlife ==
The park is home to 459 species of vascular plants, 85 species of lichens, 90 species of moss and 33 species of mushrooms. Some 44 species of mammals have been recorded, including Altai wapiti, Mongolian gazelle, Siberian roe deer, wild boar, argali, Siberian ibex, Mongolian marmots, Mongolian wolf, Siberian lynx, Pallas's cat, red fox, corsac fox and European badger. The park has been designated an Important Bird Area by BirdLife International; its 217 bird species of birds include golden eagle, lammergeier, great bustard, whooper swan, black stork, Daurian partridge and little owl. There are 16 species of fish, two species of amphibians, and 385 species of insects (including 21 species of ants, 55 species of butterflies, 10 species of bush crickets and 29 species of grasshoppers). A new species of soil insect has been found in the Hustai and given the scientific name of Epidamaeus khustaiensis.

== Management ==
Hustai National Park was the first park to be managed by a Non-governmental Organization specializing in nature and environmental conservation. The park was managed by the Mongolian Association for the Conservation of Nature and the Environment during 1993–2003. A dedicated NGO, the Hustai National Park Trust (HNPT), was established in 2003 and signed a contract with the Mongolian Government which delegated the management of the HNP to the new NGO.

The HNPT conducts operations in five main activity areas as follows:

1. Conservation and protection of ecosystems and historical sites in the park.
2. Reintroduction of the last species of wild horse – the Takhi – and building-up of a sustainable wild population.
3. Organization of international training courses and research.
4. Development of ecotourism.
5. Development of the buffer zone of the HNP.

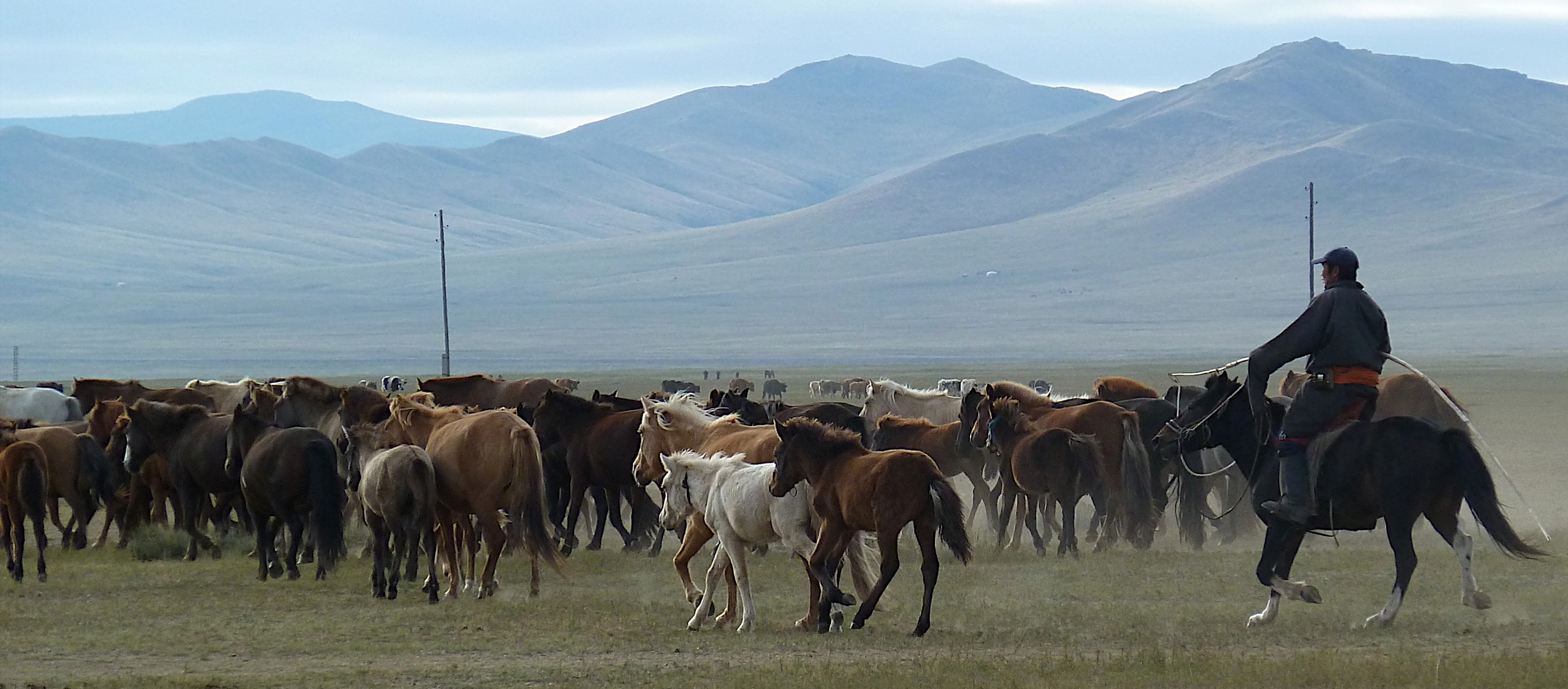
Takhi in Khustain Nuruu National Parklj

The Trust has around 60 employees, working in five units as follows:

1. Administration
2. Training and research
3. Protection
4. Tourism
5. Buffer zone development

Since 1993, the HNP has implemented the following international projects, supported by the Dutch Government:

1. Hustain Nuruu nature reserves, 1993–1997
2. Conservation of the biodiversity of the HNP, 1998–2003
3. Support to the management of the HNP, 2004–2008
4. Development of sustainable livelihoods in the buffer zone of the HNP, 2004–2008
5. Adaptation to changing conditions in the HNP and its buffer zone, 2009–2012
