= Bulangaa, Töv =

Settlement in Büren, Töv, Mongolia

Coordinates: 46°45′56″N 105°34′14″E

Bulangaa (Mongolian: Булангаа) is a settlement in the Büren sum (administrative district) of the Töv Province in Mongolia. Bulangaa was formerly the center of the Önjüül sum.

Bulangaa is located 43 km south east of the Büren sum center and 50 km south-west of the Bayan-Önjüül sum center.
