= Korea–Mongolia Greenbelt Project =

Forestation project in Mongolia

- Mongolian: Монгол-Солонгосын хамтарсан Ногоон хэрэм төсөл Korean: 한-몽 그린벨트 사업단
- Formation: 2007; 19 years ago
- Founder: Mongolia; South Korea
- Purpose: Combat desertification, prevent forest degradation and forest fires
- Location: Mongolia
- Website: kmgreenbeltproject.org/mn/

The Korea–Mongolia Greenbelt Project (Mongolian: Монгол-Солонгосын хамтарсан Ногоон хэрэм төсөл; Korean: 한-몽 그린벨트 사업단) is an intergovernmental forestation project in Mongolia by the Government of South Korea and Government of Mongolia.

== History ==
The project was launched in 2007 as an initiative between the Korea Forest Service and the Ministry of Environment of Mongolia, following the signing of a memorandum of understanding. In 2008, the forestation work began.

== Geography ==
The forested areas in Lün in Töv Province, Dalanzadgad and Bayanzag in Ömnögovi Province cover an area of 3,046 hectares. As of 2024, more than 800,000 trees had been planted, which consist of 23 species.

== See also ==
- Afforestation – Establishment of trees where there were none previously
- Geography of Mongolia
- Environmental issues in Mongolia
