= Chandmani =

Chandmani (Mongolian: Чандмань, jewel; also Chandman) signifies:

- the Mongolian term for Cintamani, a Buddhist symbol
- Chandmani Uul, a mountain in Mongolia
- Chandmani Uul Aimag, a historical Aimag (province) of Mongolia
- several Sums (districts) in different Aimags of Mongolia:
  - Chandmani, Govi-Altai
  - Chandmani, Khovd
  - Chandmani-Öndör, Khövsgöl
  - Bayanchandmani, Töv
