= EATOF =

East Asia Inter-Regional Tourism Federation
- Abbreviation: EATOF
- Purpose: International Tourism Conference
- Inaugurated: 2000 Gangwon Province, Korea
- Website: http://www.eatof.org

East Asia Inter-Regional Tourism Federation (EATOF) was founded in Gangwon State, Korea in 2000 in order to pursue peace and prosperity through exchange in diverse fields, especially on tourism. Nine member countries from Northeast and Southeast Asian Provinces founded participated at the preliminary meeting in Seoul in September 1999. It is the only international tourism association in East Asia. EATOF has 10 member provinces.

== Functions ==
Each member is playing following roles to achieve goals of EATOF:

- Exchange of information on tourism policy and tourism industry
- Development of joint programs which promote tourism in individual provinces and the region as a whole
- Training, education and exchange of personnel working in the tourism sector both private and public
- Other matters related to mutual cooperation in tourism

== History ==
=== 2000 ===
After preliminary meeting, EATOF 2000 was held in Gangwon Province, Korea with participation of nine member provinces.

=== 2006 ===
Quang Ninh Province in Vietnam became a regular member.

=== 2007 ===
At the EATOF 2007 in Chiang Mai Province the group agreed to establish the EATOF Permanent Secretariat.

=== 2008 ===
EATOF permanent secretariat was established in Gangwon Province.

=== 2009 ===
Siem Reap in Cambodia and Luang Prabang in Laos became regular members.

== Member Province ==
Country	Provinces	Logo	Accession
South Korea	Gangwon Province		Founding member
Indonesia	Yogyakarta Special Region		Founding member
Philippines	Cebu		Founding member
Japan	Tottori		Founding member
China	Jilin		Founding member
Malaysia	Sarawak		Founding member
Thailand	Chiang Mai		Founding member
Mongolia	Tuv		Founding member
Russia	Primorsky		Founding member
Vietnam	Quảng Ninh Province		2005
Laos	Luang Prabang		2009
Cambodia	Siem Reap		2009

EATOF General Assembly
No	Date	Country	Host	Theme
1st	5–7 September 2000	South Korea	Gangwon Province	
2nd	9–11 September 2001	Indonesia	Yogyakarta Special Region	
3rd	22‒24 September 2002	Philippines	Cebu	
4th	5–7 September 2004	Japan	Tottori	
5th	2–4 September 2005	China	Jilin	
6th	14–16 September 2006	Malaysia	Sarawak	
7th	5–7 September 2007	Thailand	Chiang Mai	
8th	21‒23 July 2008	Mongolia	Ulan Bator	
9th	8–10 September 2009	South Korea	Gangwon Province	
10th	2010	Vietnam	Quảng Ninh Province	EATOF 2010 - For the sustainable development in East Asia
11th	22‒25 November 2011	Philippines	Cebu	Celebrating 12 Years of Enduring Cooperation and Commitment
12th	28 November – 1 December 2012	Cambodia	Siem Reap Province	East Asia Optimizing Sustainable Green Tourism
13th	17–21 October 2013	Laos	Luang Prabang Province	Tourism, the Key to Sustainable Cultural Conservation
14th	4-6 September 2014	Malaysia	Kuching, Sarawak	Growing Regional Tourism Together
15th	2015	Indonesia	Yogyakarta Special Region	
16th	2018	Japan	Tottori Prefecture	
17th	2022	Vietnam	Quang Ninh Province	Tourism Recovery in East Asia in the New Normal Era
18th	2024	Mongolia	Tuv Province	Bridging Global and Local
19th	2022	Philippines	Cebu	NEW EATOF, GO GLOCAL
