= Sermsang Khushig Khundii Solar Power Plant =

Photovoltaic power plant in Sergelen, Sergelen, Mongolia

- Official name: Хөшигийн Хөндий Нарны Цахилгаан Станц
- Country: Mongolia
- Location: Sergelen, Töv
- Coordinates: 47°37′12.6″N 106°43′36.3″E
- Status: Operational
- Commission date: 2019
- Construction cost: US$18.7 million

Power generation
- Nameplate capacity: 15 MW
- Annual net output: 22.3 GWh

The Sermsang Khushig Khundii Solar Power Plant (Mongolian: Хөшигийн Хөндий Нарны Цахилгаан Станц) is a photovoltaic power station in Sergelen District, Töv Province, Mongolia.

== History ==
The financial loan agreement was signed on 20 March 2019 by Asian Development Bank (ADB) and Leading Asia's Private Sector Infrastructure Fund (LEAP) with Sermsang Power Corporation Public Company Limited (SSP) and Tenuun Gerel Construction LLC (TGC). The power plant was commissioned on 6 July 2019.

== Technical specifications ==
The power plant has an installed generation capacity of 15 MW. It has an annual electricity generation of 22.3 GWh. It supplies electricity to the Central Energy System of the national grid.

== Management ==
The power plant was constructed by SSP and TGC.

== Finance ==
The project was constructed with a cost of US$18.7 million. About US$9.6 million of it was provided by ADB and the remaining by LEAP. For the technical assistance, the grant was provided by the Canadian Climate Fund for the Private Sector in Asia.

== See also ==
- List of power stations in Mongolia
