= Maidar City =

Urban development project in Sergelen, Töv, Mongolia

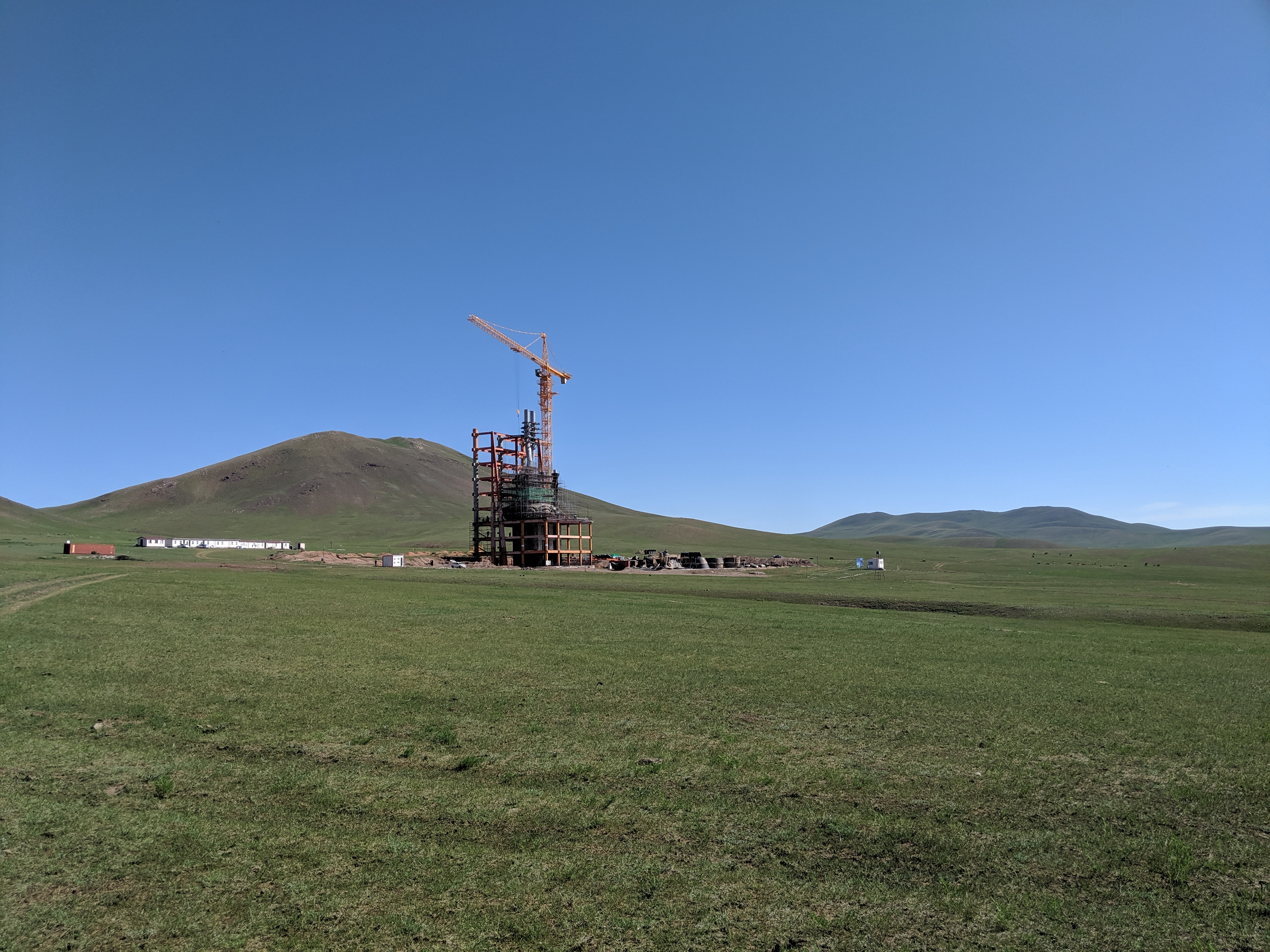
- Construction of Maidar City in June 2019

- Location within Mongolia
- Coordinates: 47°39′36″N 107°6′36″E
- Country: Mongolia
- Province: Töv Province
- Elevation: 1,600 m (5,200 ft)
- Time zone: UTC+8 (UTC + 8)

Maidar City, also called Maidar Eco City, is an urban development project, located in Sergelen, Töv Province, Mongolia. The design of Maidar City was created by the Cologne architect Stefan Schmitz. The city is expected to accommodate 280,000 inhabitants after its completion.

== Name ==
The word Maidar refers to the Buddha Maitreya, the Buddha of the future. According to the planners' ideas, the future city should follow the principles of ecological urban development - in keeping with the spirit of Maitreya. The main goals of the urban design are sustainability, low CO_{2} emissions, environmental protection and social harmony.

== Project description ==
The project is intended to relieve the pressure on Ulaanbaatar, which can no longer cope with the influx of nomads.

A central complex currently under construction with a Buddha statue - which, at 54 meters high, will be taller than the Statue of Liberty in New York City - forms the center of the new city, which is being planned according to high ecological standards. The project has been certified by the German Sustainable Building Council.

The most important design idea is the city of short distances. The city, whose planned area is 114 km^{2} (44 sq mi), will be divided into different districts, each of which will function autonomously as a city within the city. The distribution of functions and the traffic system are designed in such a way that the use of private cars can be largely dispensed with. The main routes in the city are the so-called urban arteries - streets that are intended exclusively for pedestrians, cyclists and public electric vehicles. They connect the centers of the individual districts with each other and are designed without crossings to the roads of motorized traffic. The most important supply facilities of the city are located on the urban arteries, which can be reached within a maximum of 600 m from the residential buildings. The districts are separated by landscaped green areas that are used for leisure activities, sports and recreation and contrast with the characteristic hills and mountain peaks that have been left in their natural state.

The areas south of the city are being used for agricultural purposes, which will expand southwards over the years and stop the advance of the Gobi Desert. These areas are primarily used to ensure the new city's self-sufficiency. The new city's energy supply comes largely from renewable energies. A wind turbine with an output of 1.5 MW is being built east of Maidar City. The construction of Maidar City is being financed, among other things, through the sale of miniature figures of Maitreya.

== History ==
The central complex with the Buddha statue was started in the summer of 2014. The plans originally assumed that the entire project would be completed by 2024. Later, it was reported that the first district for 90,000 residents would be completed by 2030. In the following years, the project made little progress, and by the summer of 2019, only the Buddha statue was under construction. There was no sign of any other construction work at the construction site until then.

In 2020, the State Great Khural approved the construction of the city. In 2021, Chinggis Khaan International Airport was opened west of Maidar.
