= Mongolian Ornithological Society =

Organization based in Ulaanbaatar, Mongolia

- Formation: 1999
- Type: Non-profit organization
- Headquarters: Ulaanbaatar
- Coordinates: 47°55′45.14″N 106°55′14.94″E
- Region served: Mongolia
- President & CEO: Dr. Sundev Gombobaatar
- Main organ: Board of Members
- Website: www.mos.mn/eng

The Mongolian Ornithological Society), was founded in 1999 in the capital city, Ulaanbaatar. It is non-profit environmental organisation dedicated to the research and conservation of birds and their habitats, and also other wildlife in Mongolia. It publishes a peer-reviewed annual scientific journal, Ornis Mongolica, and other bird-related books, guidebooks and papers on bird research works and conservation activities in Mongolia and other countries. The Society raises funds for conservation and educational activities by arranging bird watching and wildlife tours to different parts of Mongolia. The society puts great emphasis on educating young researchers and raising public awareness on conservation. Its board members consist of well-known ornithologists, biologists and ecologists from Mongolia and other countries. In collaboration with the Ornithological Laboratory at the National University of Mongolia, a total of more than 30 scientific theses by bachelors, masters, and Ph.D. students have been supervised by members of the society.

The society also helps collect skin, feathers, and scientific data from birds for the Zoological museum at the University. The feather collection is one of the best collections in the country.

== Mission ==
- Conduct and propose international ornithological research projects in Mongolia, together with Mongolian and international ornithological organizations.
- Make statements, publications and appeals to the public about research and protection of rare and endangered bird species.
- Co-control the illegal hunting of rare and endangered species of birds and work with organizations that monitor and prevent such criminal-activities in Mongolia.
- Organize and participate in international and Mongolian ornithological scientific conferences, press conferences, training activities and seminars in Mongolia and overseas.
- Award members who actively participate in ornithological studies and the society’s activities.
- Organize ornithological expeditions and field trips for bird watching and bird filming with both Mongolian and international eco-tourism organizations/institutions.

== Current activities ==
The society has been celebrating World Migratory Bird Day every year in Mongolia since 2011 by organizing bird watching trips, exhibitions on Mongolian bird photographs, children's art contest, lectures and seminars in order to raise public awareness on conservation of birds and their habitats.

The society collects information on Mongolian birds, which helps create Mongolian National Bird Database. In order to conserve bird habitats in Mongolia, the society designate wetlands to Ramsar or other international treaties.

== Collaborative organizations ==
- Mongolian Academy of Sciences - Mongolia
- Ministry of Environment, Green Development and Tourism - Mongolia
- Mongolian Ornithological Foundation - Mongolia
- Mongolian State Agriculture University - Mongolia
- Hustai National Park – Mongolia
- The Royal Society for Bird Protection – UK
- Oriental Bird Club – UK
- Halle-Wittenberg University – Germany
- Yamashina Institute for Ornithology – Japan
- Wilhelmshaven Avian Research Institute – Germany
- Czech Radio
- United Nations Development Program
- International birding & research centre in Eilat, Israel
- The University of Kansas, USA
- Harvard University, USA

== Projects ==
- 2014–2016. Complete Ornithological Survey at the Salkhit Wind Farm, Mongolia.
- 2013–2015. Ecology and migration research of Pallas’s Fish Eagle Haliaeetus leucoryphus in Mongolia (funded by, and in collaboration with The University of Kansas).
- 2014. The extensive Barn Swallow Hirundo rustica survey (in collaboration with Colorado University in Mongolia).
- 2013. The first extensive government-supported workshop on birding and wildlife-watching tourism in Mongolia.
- 2013. The first extensive survey of raptor migrations in Mongolia collaborating with Asian Raptor Research and Conservation Network.
- 2012. The first national multilateral ministries workshop on the electrocution of raptors.
- 2012. The Palearctic bird survey along the trail of Lars Svensson (in collaboration with Harvard University).
- 2008–2012. Regional Redlist of Birds in Mongolia (supported by Dutch Government (NEMO-2), World Bank, Ministry of Nature, Environment and Tourism, Mongolia).
- 2009–2010. The status and distribution of Pallas’s Fish Eagle in Mongolia (funded by, and in collaboration with The Peregrine Fund).
- 2009–2011. Avian influenza and bird migration in Mongolia (funded by OIE, Japan).
- 2008–2010. Taxonomy and bar-coding of birds (supported by Oslo University, Norway).
- 2008–2009. Migration studies of Geese in Mongolia (funded by Japanese Government).
- 2008–2009. A risk assessments of high-voltage electric powerlines in Mongolia (funded by the Asia Research Centre, Korean Foundation for Advanced Studies, South Korea).
- 2008–2009. The Assessment of high risk utility lines and conservation of the globally threatened pole-nesting steppe raptors in Mongolia (funded by the Oriental Bird Club, UK).
- 2007–2008. Taxonomy, biology and ecology of Upland Buzzard Buteo hemilasius in Mongolia (funded by the Asian Research Centre, Korean Foundation for Advanced Studies, South Korea).
- 2007–2008. Mongolian wild ass conservation in southern Mongolia: Conservation actions, involvement and education of local people (with Anne-Camille SOURIS; funded by National Museum of Natural History of Paris, France and National Geographic Society, USA).
- 2007–2008. Mitigating raptor electrocutions in Mongolia (funded by IBRC, Eilat, Israel, Lynette International Foundation, UK and EDM International, Inc USA).
- 2005. The importance of North East Mongolia for Pacific Golden Plovers (funded by Foundation Working Group International Waterbird & Wetland Research (WIWO)).
- 2004–2006. Satellite tracking of Black stork Ciconia nigra in Mongolia (with National Radio of Czech; funded by Ministry of Nature and Environment of Czech and Union of Czech and Slovak zoological gardens).
- 2004–2005. Wintering waterfowl census in the Tuul river and valley (funded by Khustai National Park, Mongolia).
- 2004. Important Bird Areas (IBA) Survey in Eastern Mongolia (with RSPB researchers; funded by the WCS and RSPB).
- 2003–2005. Relationship between the Raptors and Brandt’s Vole in Mongolian Steppe Ecosystems (funded by GEF/UNDP).
- 2002. Taxonomy of the Meadow Bunting Emberiza cioides in Mongolia (with the Bird Banding Centre of the Yamashina Institute for Ornithology).
- 2001. Satellite tracking of White-naped crane Grus vipio in Eastern Mongolia (collaboration with the Bird Banding Centre of the Yamashina Institute for Ornithology; funded by the institution).
- 2000. Ecosystems of Bogd Khan Mountain, Mongolia (funded by the Mongolian government).
- 2000–2001. Saxaul Sparrow Passer ammodendri in the Mongolian Gobi (in collaboration with Dr.Kate Oddie; funded by Darwin Initiative and Zoological Society, UK).
- 1999–2001. Globally Threatened White-naped crane Grus vipio in Mongolia: Habitat use and livestock grazing (with the Institute of Avian Research ‘Vogelwarte Helgoland”. Funded by the Birdlife International, Biodiversity project, Stifferverband fund, Germany, and Stiftung Wurth, Germany).
- 1998–2007. Saker falcon in Mongolia: Research and Conservation (with Environmental Research and Wildlife Development Agency, UAE).
- 1995. Mongolian-German Joint Biodiversity Research in Eastern Mongolia (with researchers from Germany).
- 1994. Russian-Mongolian Joint Crane Conservation Project in Mongolia (with Daurian Strictly Protected Area of Russia).
