= Luen =

Luen may refer to:

== People ==
- Raymond Kwok Ping Luen (born 1952)
- See Kok Luen, Malaysian football player
- Yea Luen (born 1950), Hong Kong singer and actor

== Places ==
- Lüen, Switzerland
- Luen Wo Hui, Hong Kong

== Other ==
- Luen Group, Hong Kong organized crime triad

== See also ==
- Lün, Mongolia
