= Baraat, Töv =

Bag in Bayan-Önjüül, Töv, Mongolia

Coordinates: 46°50′42″N 106°13′48″E

Baraat (Mongolian: Бараат) is a bag in Bayan-Önjüül sum of Töv Province in Mongolia. Baraat is former Bayan-Baraat sum center. It is 30 km SE from Bayan-Önjüül sum center.
