= Tseel =

Tseel (Mongolian: Цээл) may refer to one of several sums (districts) in different aimags (provinces) of Mongolia:

- Tseel, Govi-Altai
- Tseel, Töv
