= Altanbulag =

Altanbulag is a Mongolian place name which may refer to:

- Altanbulag, Selenge, a sum of Selenge Province, near the border with Russia
- Altanbulag, Töv, a sum of Töv Province

== See also ==
- Sums of Mongolia, a type of administrative division
