= Delgerkhaan, Töv =

Coordinates: 46°37′04″N 104°34′02″E

Delgerkhaan District Дэлгэрхаан сум ᠳᠡᠯᠭᠡᠷᠬᠠᠨᠰᠤᠮᠤ
- District
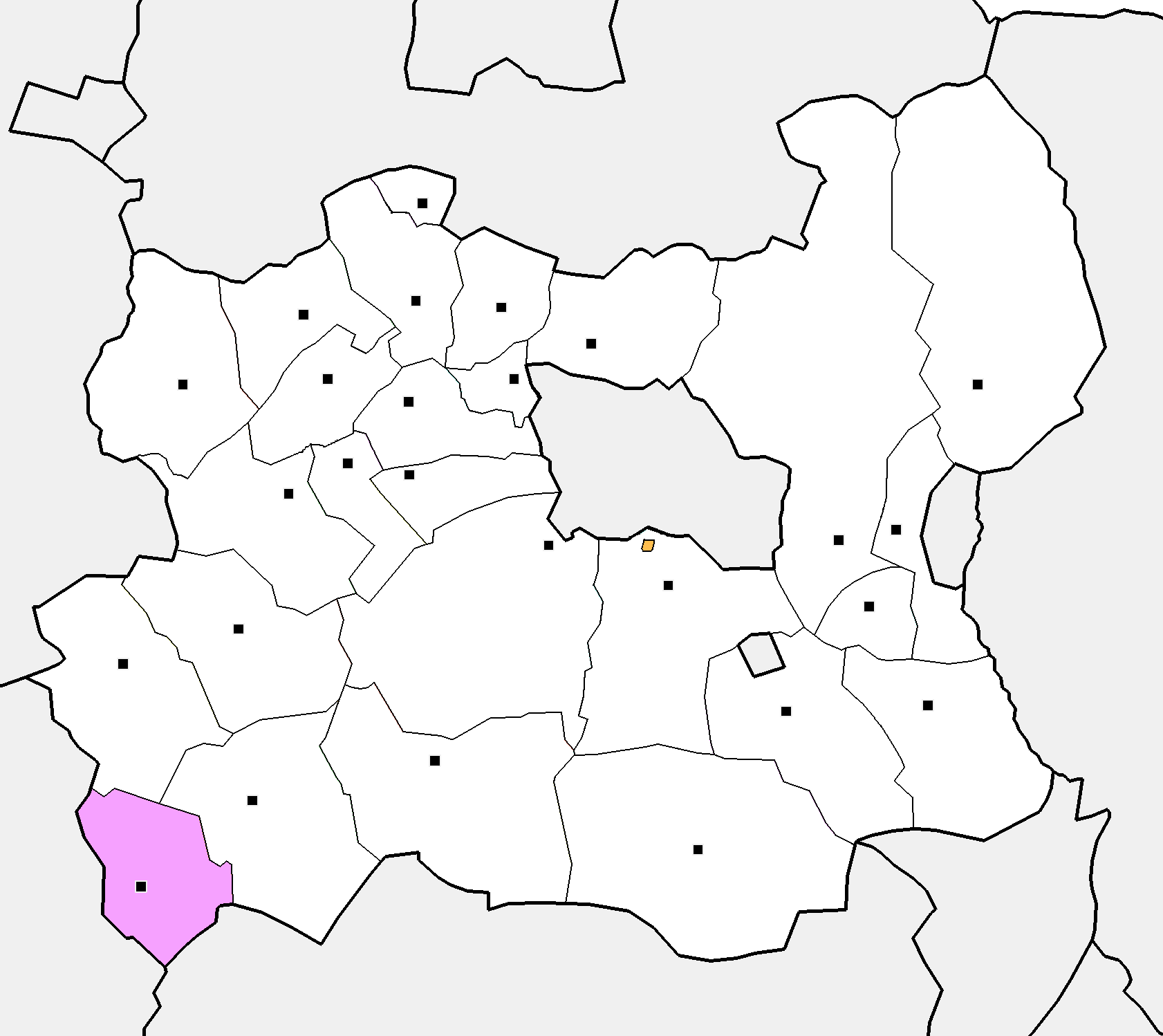
- Country: Mongolia
- Province: Töv Province
- Time zone: UTC+8 (UTC + 8)

Delgerkhaan (Mongolian: Дэлгэрхаан [tiɬkɘr̥χáɴ]) is a district of Töv Province in Mongolia.

== Geography ==
Delgerkhaan has a total area of 2,200 km^{2}.

== Administrative divisions ==
The district is divided into three bags, which are:

- Davst
- Duut-khurimt
- Targan
