= Möngönmorit =

District in Töv, Mongolia

Coordinates: 48°12′24″N 108°28′53″E

Möngönmorit District Мөнгөнморьт сум ᠮᠥᠩᠭᠦᠨᠮᠣᠷᠢᠲᠤᠰᠤᠮᠤ
- District
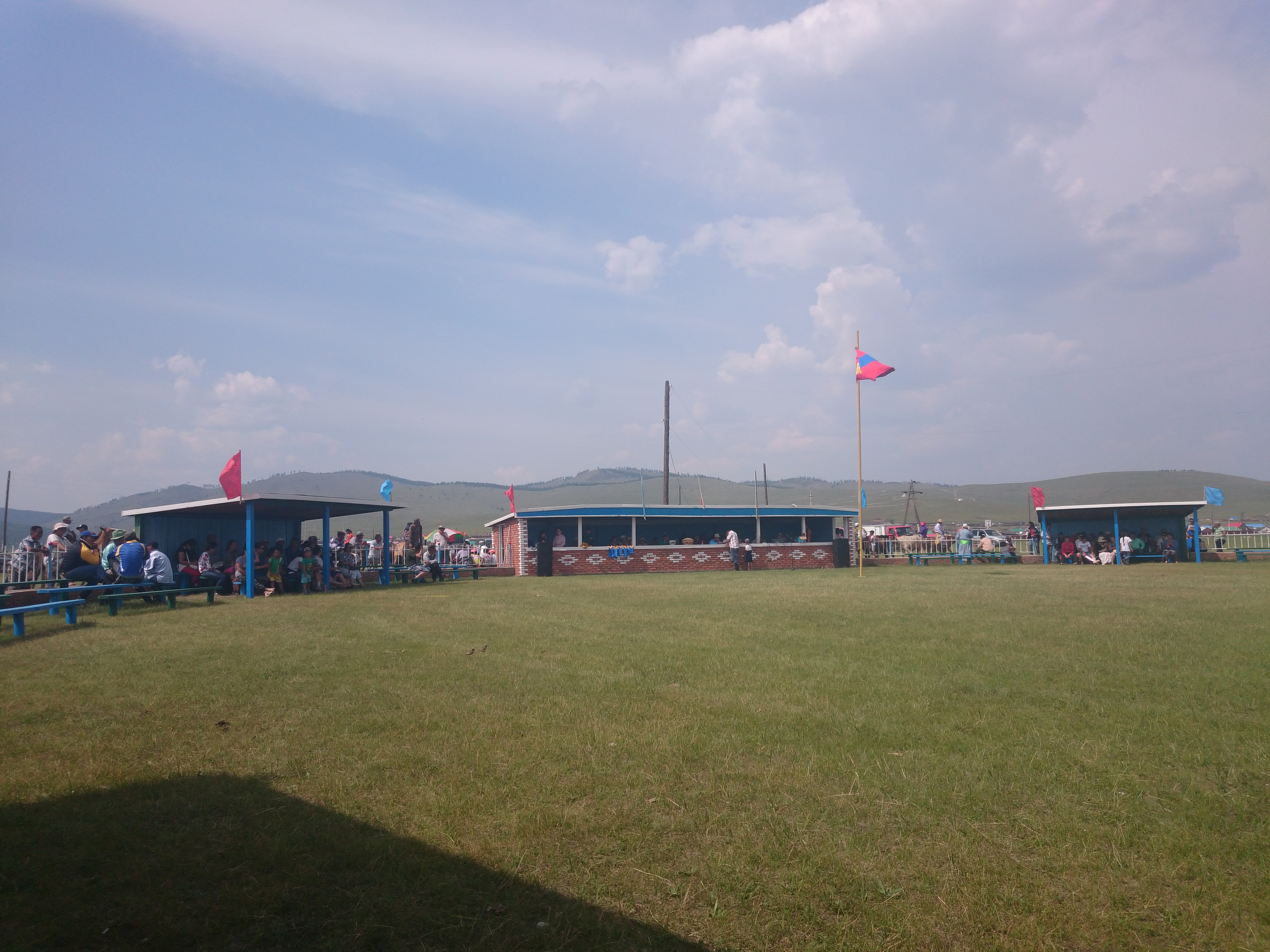

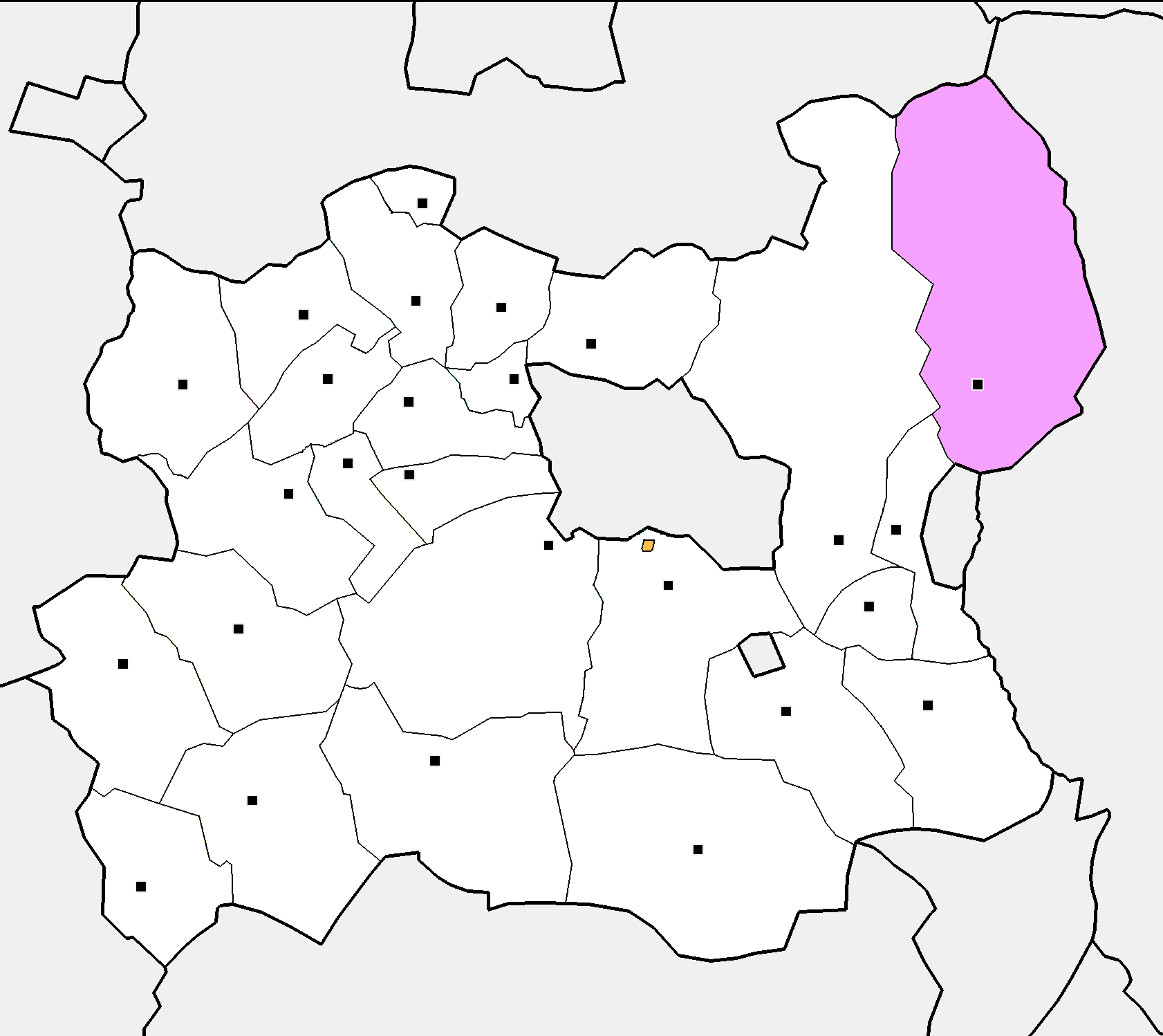
- Country: Mongolia
- Province: Töv Province
- Time zone: UTC+8 (UTC + 8)

Möngönmorit (Mongolian: Мөнгөнморьт [mɵ́ŋkʉɴ mœ́r̥ʲtʰ]; lit. 'Silver Horse') is a district of Töv Province in Mongolia. The settlement is located to the west of the Kherlen River and on the north side of a wide valley. Möngönmorit is the largest settlement close to the headwaters of the Onon River, the major tributary of the Amur River. This region and its people are well described in Chapter 1 of Black Dragon River: A Journey Down the Amur River Between Russia and China.

== Geography ==
Möngönmorit has a total area of 6,731 km^{2}. The district is the northern and eastern most sum of Töv Province.

== Administrative divisions ==
The district is divided into three bags, which are:

- Baidlag
- Bulag
- Jargalant
