= Arkhust =

District in Töv, Mongolia

Coordinates: 47°31′00″N 107°56′25″E

Arkhust District Архуст сум ᠠᠷᠤᠬᠤᠰᠤᠲᠤᠰᠤᠮᠤ
- District
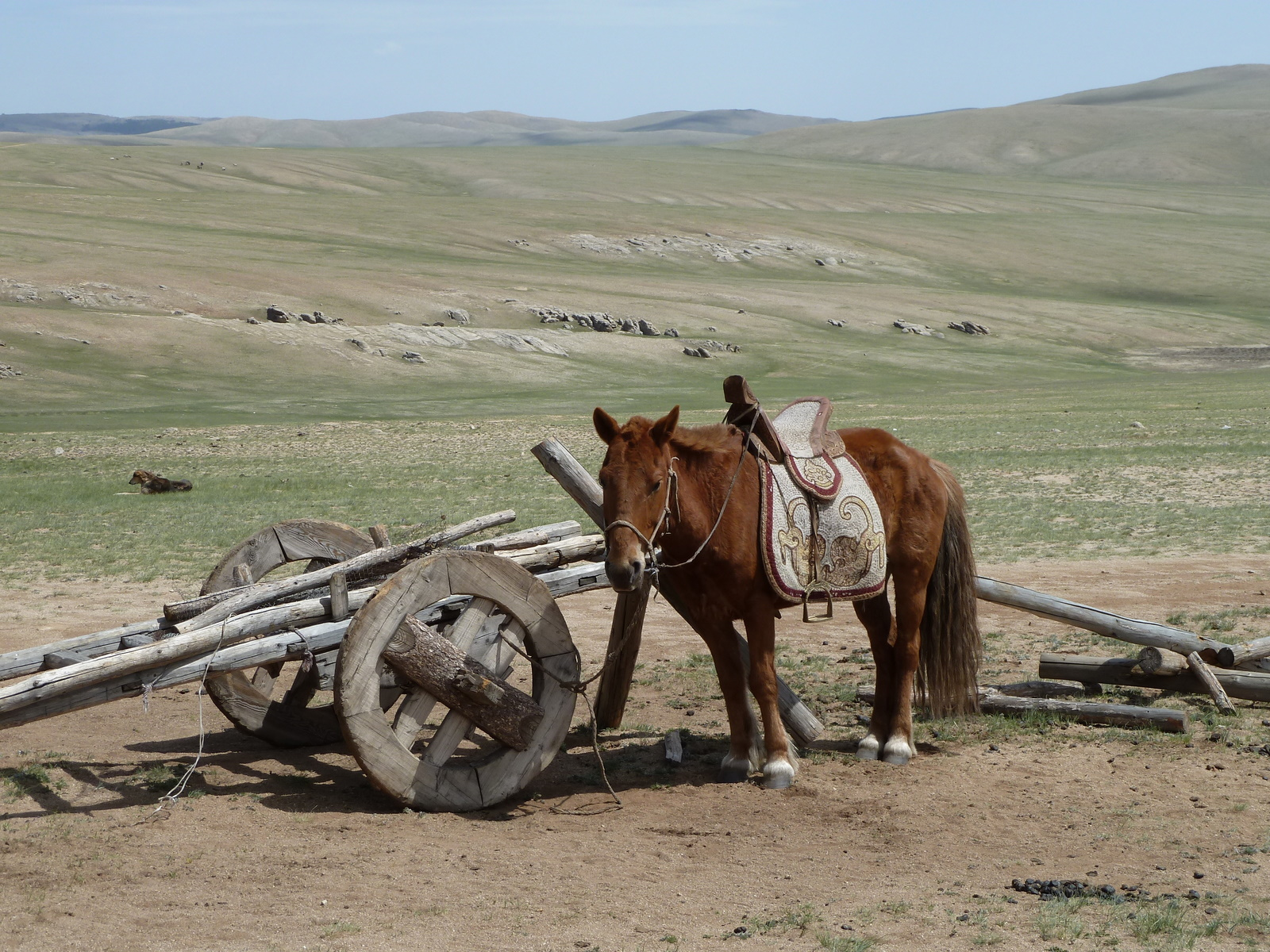
- Mongolian horse and cart in Arkhurt

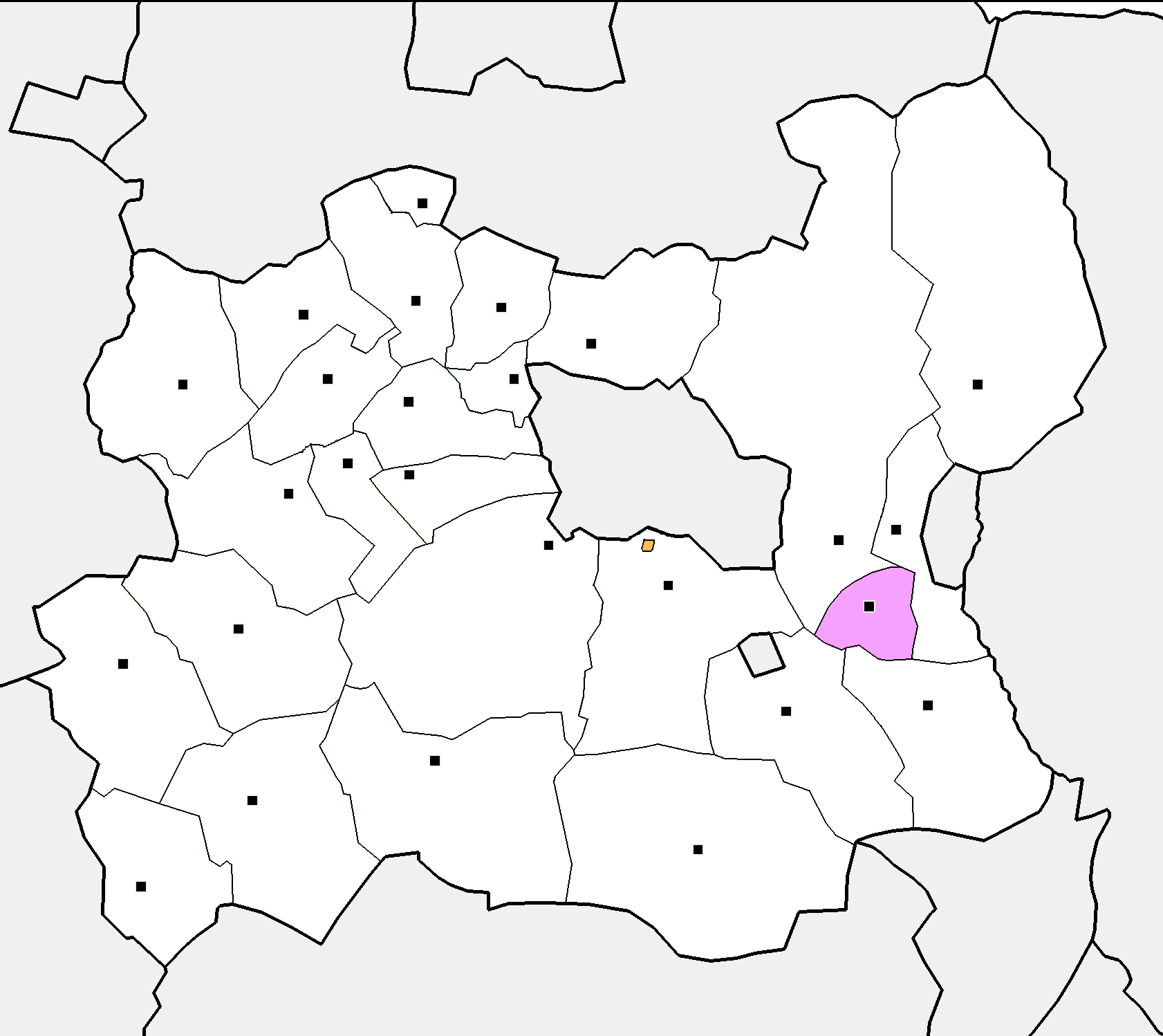
- Country: Mongolia
- Province: Töv Province

Area
  - Total: 5,900 km^{2} (2,300 sq mi)

Population
  - Total: 1,254
- Time zone: UTC+8 (UTC + 8)

Arkhust (Mongolian: Архуст [ár̥xustʰ]) is a district of Töv Province in Mongolia.

== History ==
The sum was founded in 1959.

== Geography ==
The sum has a total area of 5,900 km^{2}.

== Administrative divisions ==
The district is divided into two bags, which are:

- Narst
- Noyon Shand

== Demographics ==
The sum has a total population of 1,254 people.
