= Bornuur =

District in Töv, Mongolia

Coordinates: 48°27′53″N 106°15′26″E

Bornuur District Борнуур сум ᠪᠣᠷᠤᠨᠠᠭᠤᠷᠰᠤᠮᠤ
- District
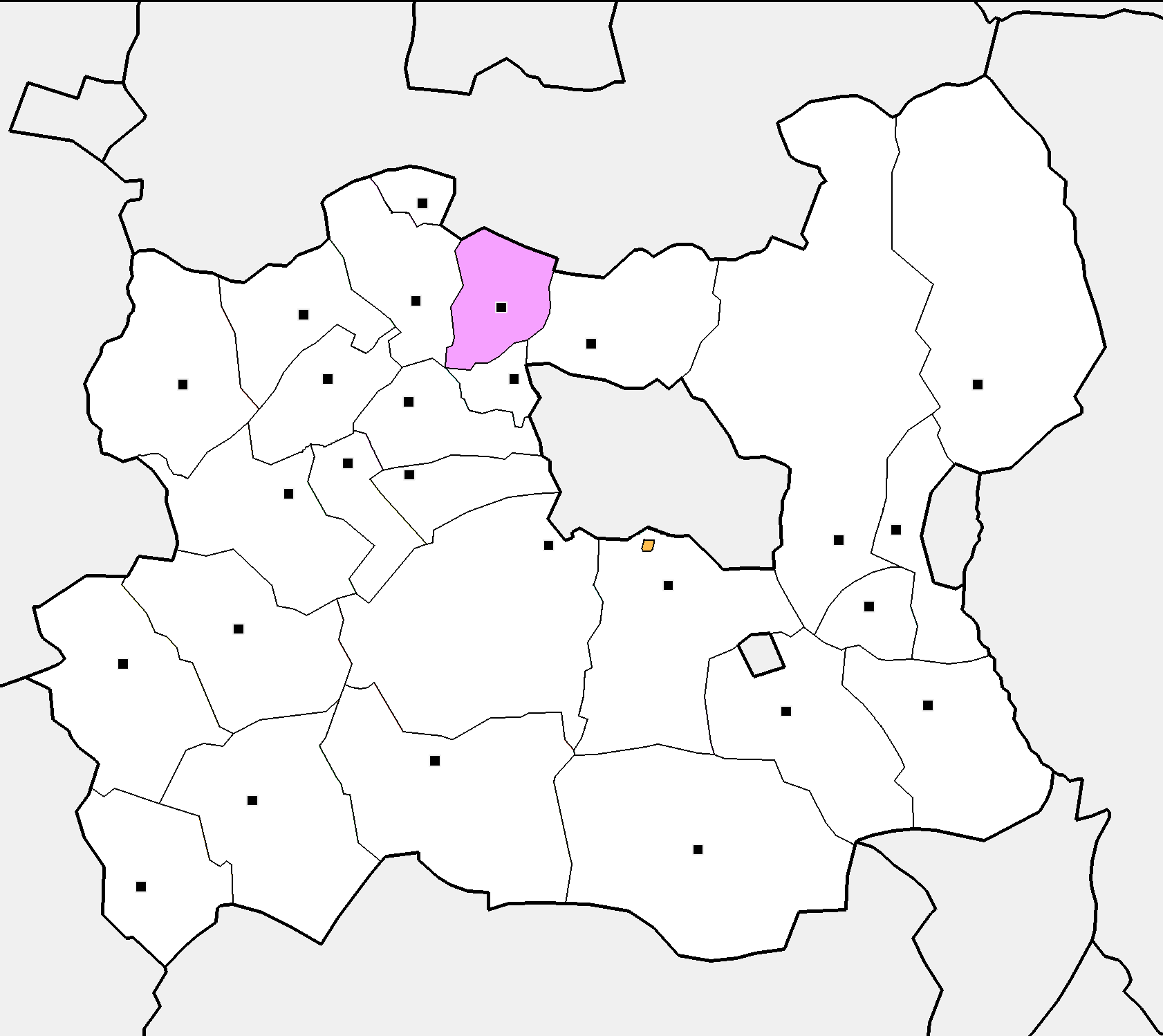
- Country: Mongolia
- Province: Töv Province

Area
  - Land: 1,146 km^{2} (442 sq mi)

Population (2023)
  - Total: 5,137
  - Density: 4.483/km^{2} (11.61/sq mi)
- Time zone: UTC+8 (UTC + 8)

Bornuur (Mongolian: Борнуур "brown lake") is a district (sum) of Töv Province in Mongolia. As of 2023, Bornuur has a population of 5,137 people living in 1,443 households. It has a large population compared to other districts in the province despite its small land area.

== History ==
Historically, the area of Bornuur was part of the old Tüsheet Khan Province. In 1938, the district was officially started under the name “Bayan-Ölziit”. The government changed its name to Bornuur in 1959.

== Geography ==
Bornuur has a total area of 1,146 km^{2}. It is located north of Töv Province, and it is 105 km northwest of the capital city Ulaanbaatar. The landscape is a mix of mountains and forests, sitting between 1,000 and 1,500 meters above sea level.

=== Transport and water ===
- Roads: A 35.6 km paved national highway runs directly through the district, making it easy to travel to major cities. The roads connecting the smaller local neighbourhoods are unpaved dirt roads.
- Water: The town center gets its clean water from six deep wells, three storage tanks, and a local water purification plant.

== Economy ==
The local economy relies mostly on agriculture, animal herding, and shops. The district’s economic plan focuses on turning Bornuur into a top regional producer of organic meat, milk, and vegetables.

The land is divided up for different local uses:

- Farming: 7,854 hectares are used for growing crops.
- Hayfields: 4,520 hectares are saved for harvesting animal feed.
- Tourism: 223.3 hectares are reserved for vacation resorts.
- Housing: About 332 hectares are used for permanent homes, and 45 hectares are used for summer cabins.

== Government ==
The district is run by the Governor’s Office of Bornuur Sum (Mongolian: Борнуур сумын Засаг даргын Тамгын газар). This office regulates local businesses, maintains public roads and water systems, and manages land distribution.

== Administrative divisions ==
The district is divided into four bags, which are:

- Bichigt
- Mandal
- Nart
- Ögöömör
