= Büren, Töv =

District in Töv, Mongolia

Coordinates: 46°55′11″N 105°03′13″E

Büren District Бүрэн сум ᠪᠦᠷᠢᠨᠰᠤᠮᠤ
- District
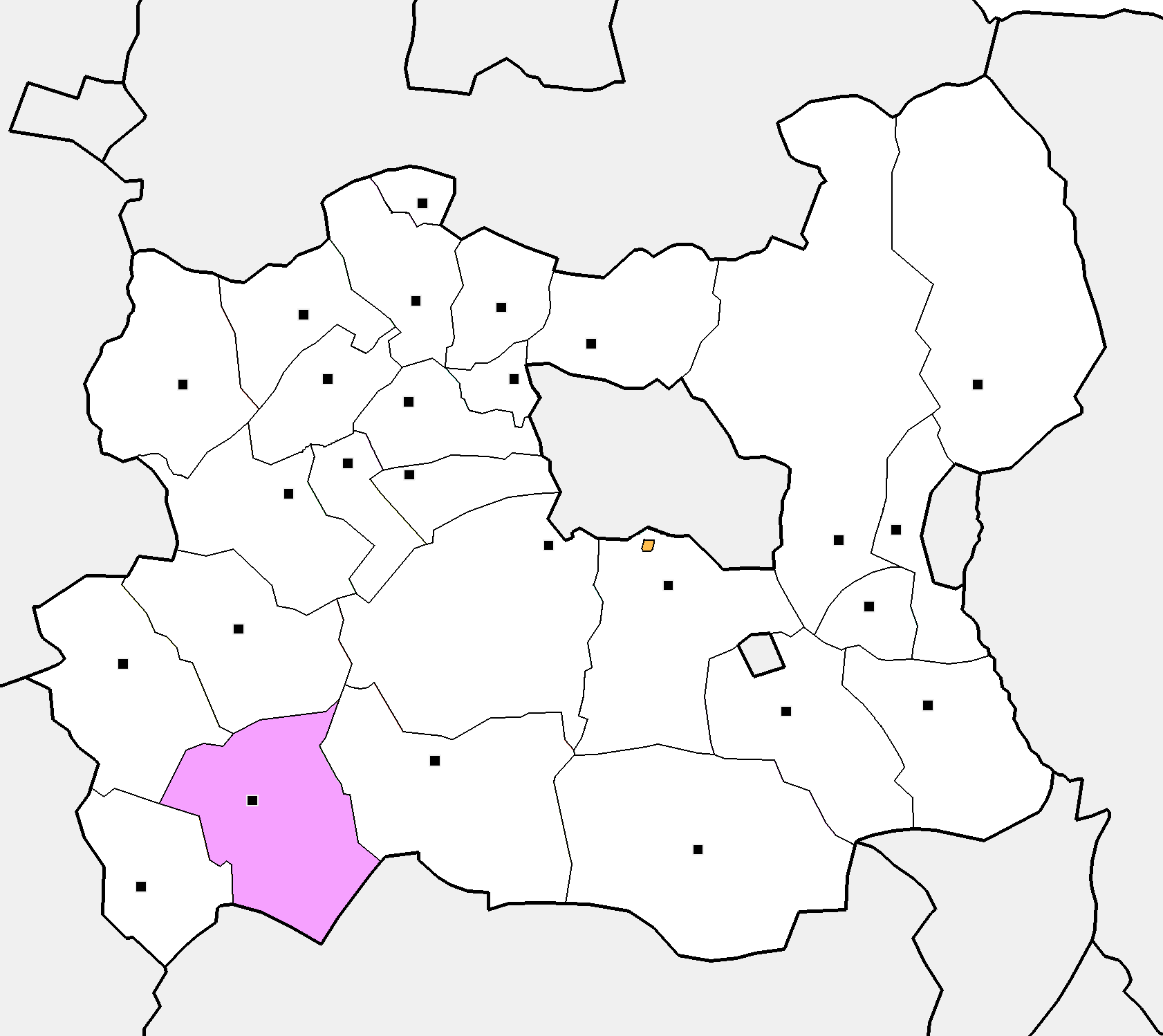
- Country: Mongolia
- Province: Töv Province
- Time zone: UTC+8 (UTC + 8)

Büren (Mongolian: Бүрэн) is a sum of the Töv Province in Mongolia. The Bulangaa settlement (former sum center) is 43 km (27 mi) SE from Büren sum center.

== Geography ==
The sum has a total area of 3,757 km^{2}.

== Administrative divisions ==
The district is divided into five bags, which are:

- Bayantsogt
- Erdenekhangai
- Mongol
- Tukhum
- Unjuul

== Demographics ==
The sum has a total population of 3,036 people.

== Notable natives ==
- Jamsrangiin Sambuu, politician and diplomat
