= Jargalant, Töv =

District in Töv, Mongolia

Coordinates: 48°31′16″N 105°52′05″E

Jargalant District Жаргалант сум ᠵᠢᠷᠭᠠᠯᠠᠩᠲᠤᠰᠤᠮᠤ
- District
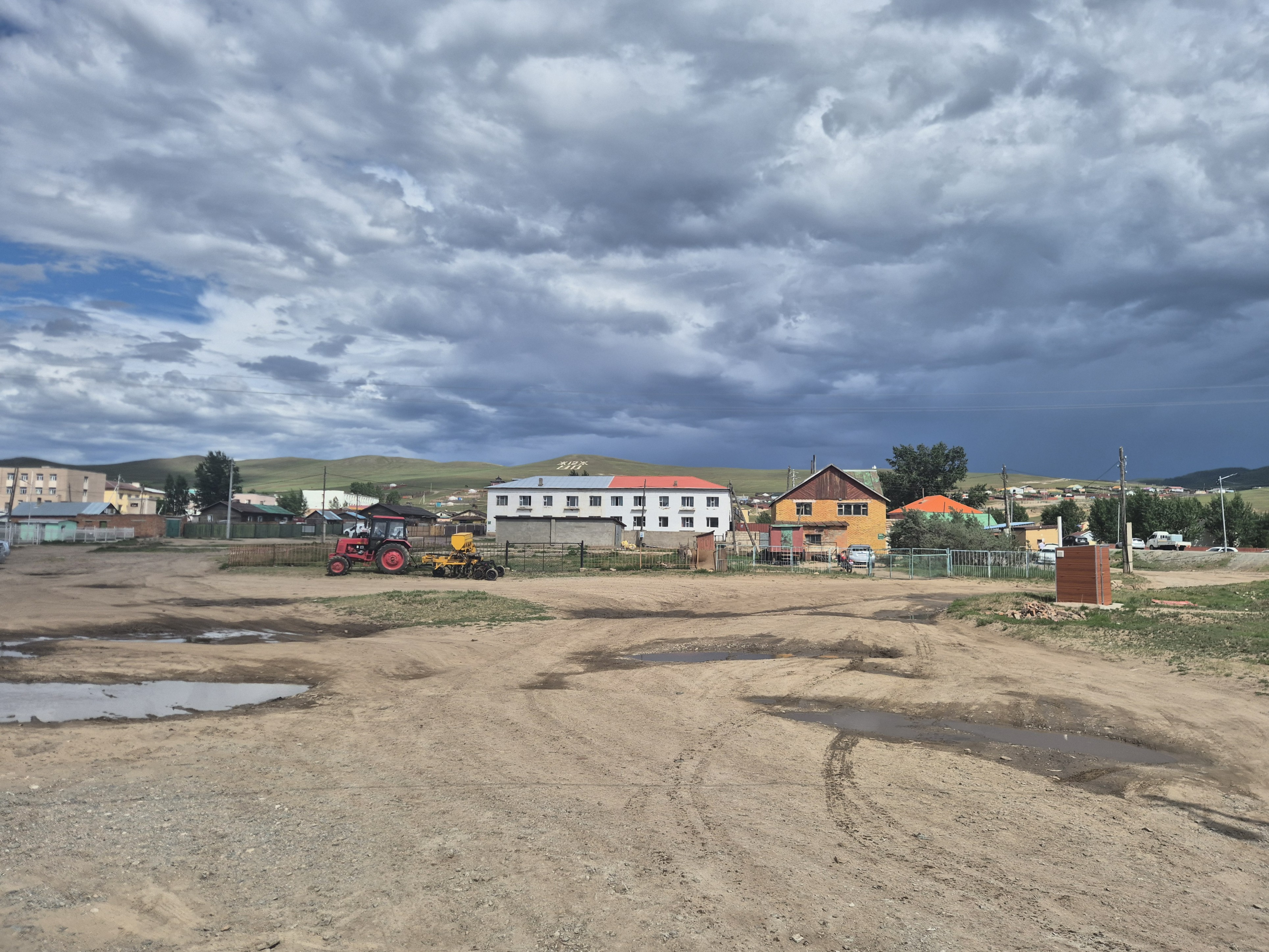

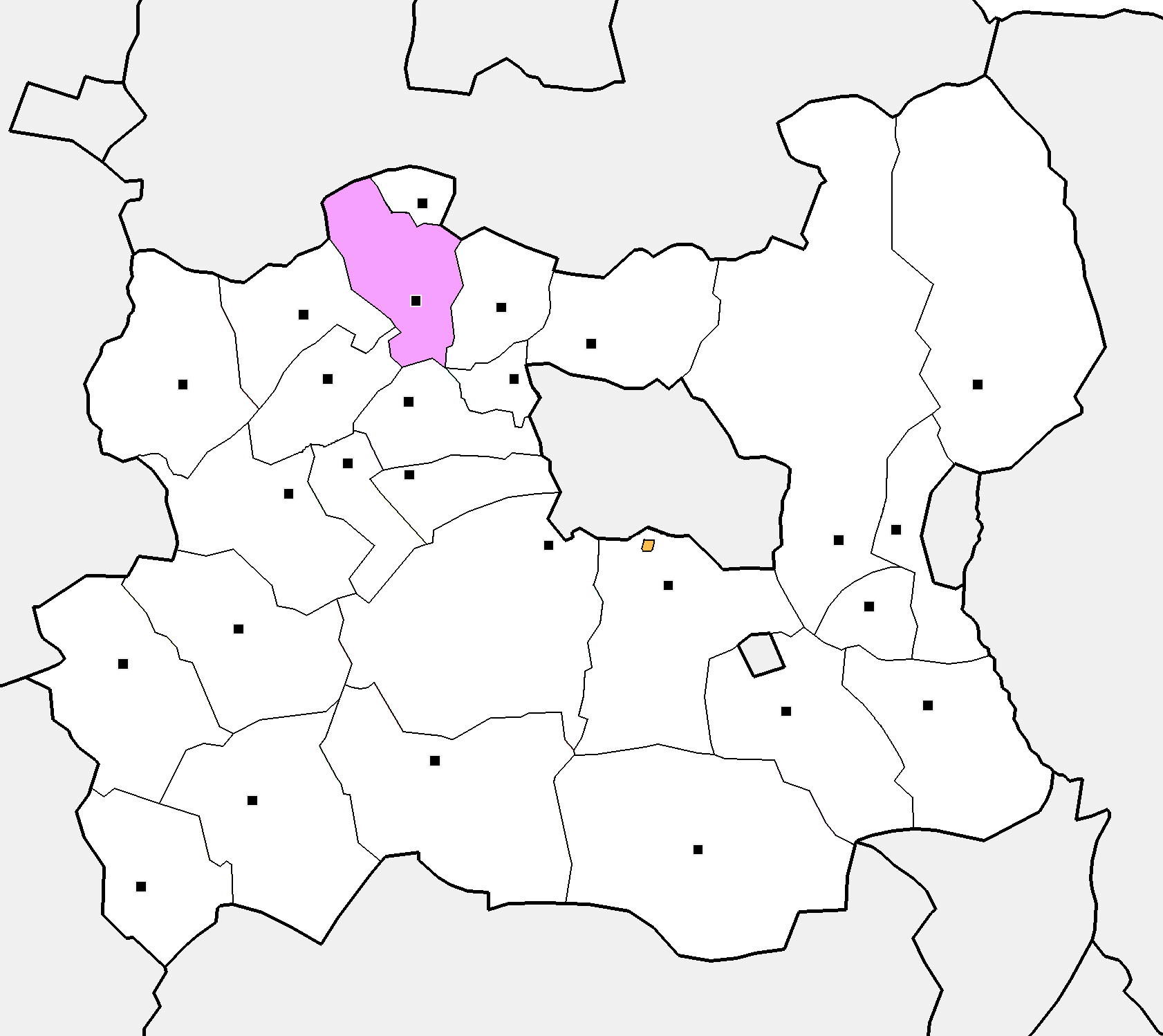
- Country: Mongolia
- Province: Töv Province
- Time zone: UTC+8 (UTC + 8)

Jargalant (Mongolian: Жаргалант [t͡ɕáɾʁɐɮən̥tʰ]; lit. 'Happiness') is a district of Töv Province in Mongolia.

== Geography ==
Jargalant has a total area of 1,868 km^{2}.

== Administrative divisions ==
The district is divided into four bags, which are:

- Bayanbulag
- Buural
- Uguumur
- Zagdal
