= Gun-Galuut Nature Reserve =

National park of Mongolia

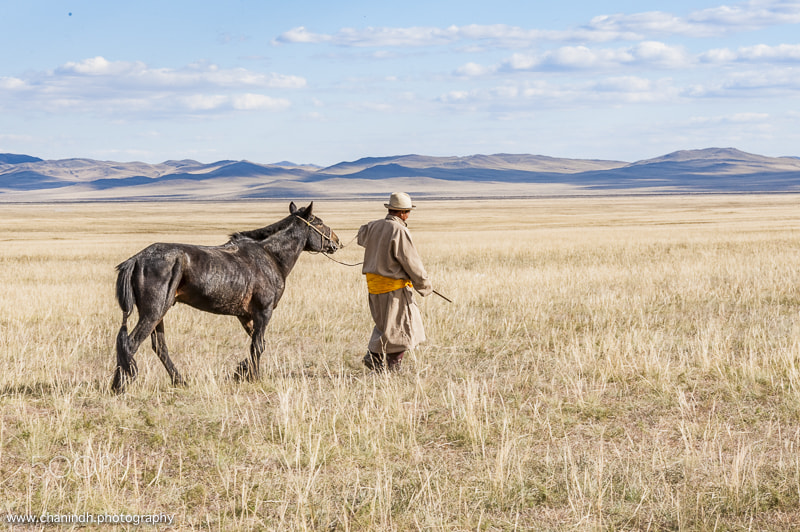
- Landscape in Gun-Galuut Reserve

- Location within Mongolia
- Location: East Central Mongolia
- Nearest city: Baganuur
- Coordinates: 47.541°N 108.343°E
- Area: 200 km^{2} (77 mi^{2})
- Established: 2003

Gun-Galuut Nature Reserve, 130 km (81 mi) south-east of Ulaanbaatar, has a great diversity of ecosystems even though it has a comparatively small area. The complex of high mountains, steppes, rivers, lakes and wetlands are kept in their original condition. Visitors to Gun-Galuut see vast steppes seeming to meet the sky, the imposing mountains of Baits and Berkh, the homeland of rare creatures, Ikh-Gun and Ayaga lakes, a paradise of birds, Kherlen, the longest river of Mongolia and the Tsengiin Burd wetland, where water and wetland birds lay their eggs.

== Fauna ==
Although limited research has been carried out on the reserve's fauna, 63 mammal species, 81 bird species, three amphibian species and 38 fish species have been recorded, including a number of nationally and globally threatened species. Among the more common mammals are the Mongolian wolf, Tarbagan marmot, souslik (ground squirrel), pika, vole, fox, corsac and jerboa. Globally threatened species include the argali, Siberian crane, white-naped crane, hooded crane, black vulture and swan goose. Among the nationally threatened species found in the park are the whooper swan, black stork, great white egret, Bar-headed goose, bearded vulture and Eurasian penduline tit.
