= Ugtaal =

Coordinates: 48°15′27″N 105°24′43″E

Ugtaal District Угтаал сум ᠤᠭᠲᠠᠭᠠᠯᠰᠤᠮᠤ
- District
- Ugtaaltsaidam District; Угтаалцайдам сум ᠤᠭᠲᠠᠭᠠᠯᠴᠠᠶᠢᠳᠠᠮᠰᠤᠮᠤ
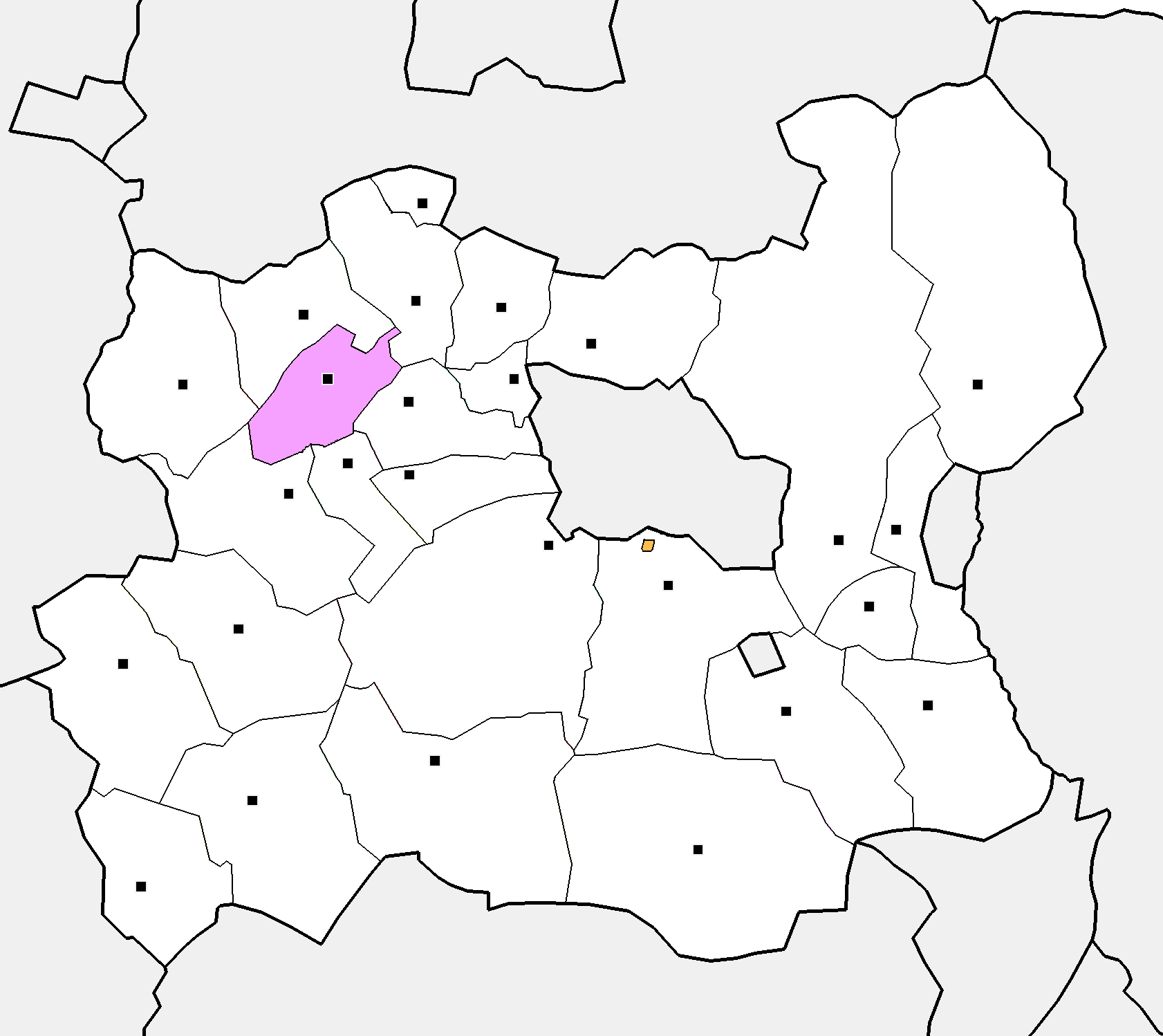
- Country: Mongolia
- Province: Töv Province
- Time zone: UTC+8 (UTC + 8)

Ugtaal (Mongolian: Угтаал [ʊχtʰáɬ]), officially Ugtaaltsaidam (Угтаалцайдам "Welcoming Salt Marsh"), is a district of Töv Province in Mongolia.

== Geography ==
Ugtaal has a total area of 1,548 km^{2}.

== Administrative divisions ==
The district is divided into three bags, which are:

- Asgat
- Khar chuluut
- Taliin uul
