= Öndörshireet =

District in Töv, Mongolia

Coordinates: 47°27′09″N 105°03′21″E

Öndörshireet District Өндөрширээт сум ᠥᠨᠳᠦᠷᠰᠢᠷᠡᠭᠡᠲᠦᠰᠤᠮᠤ
- District
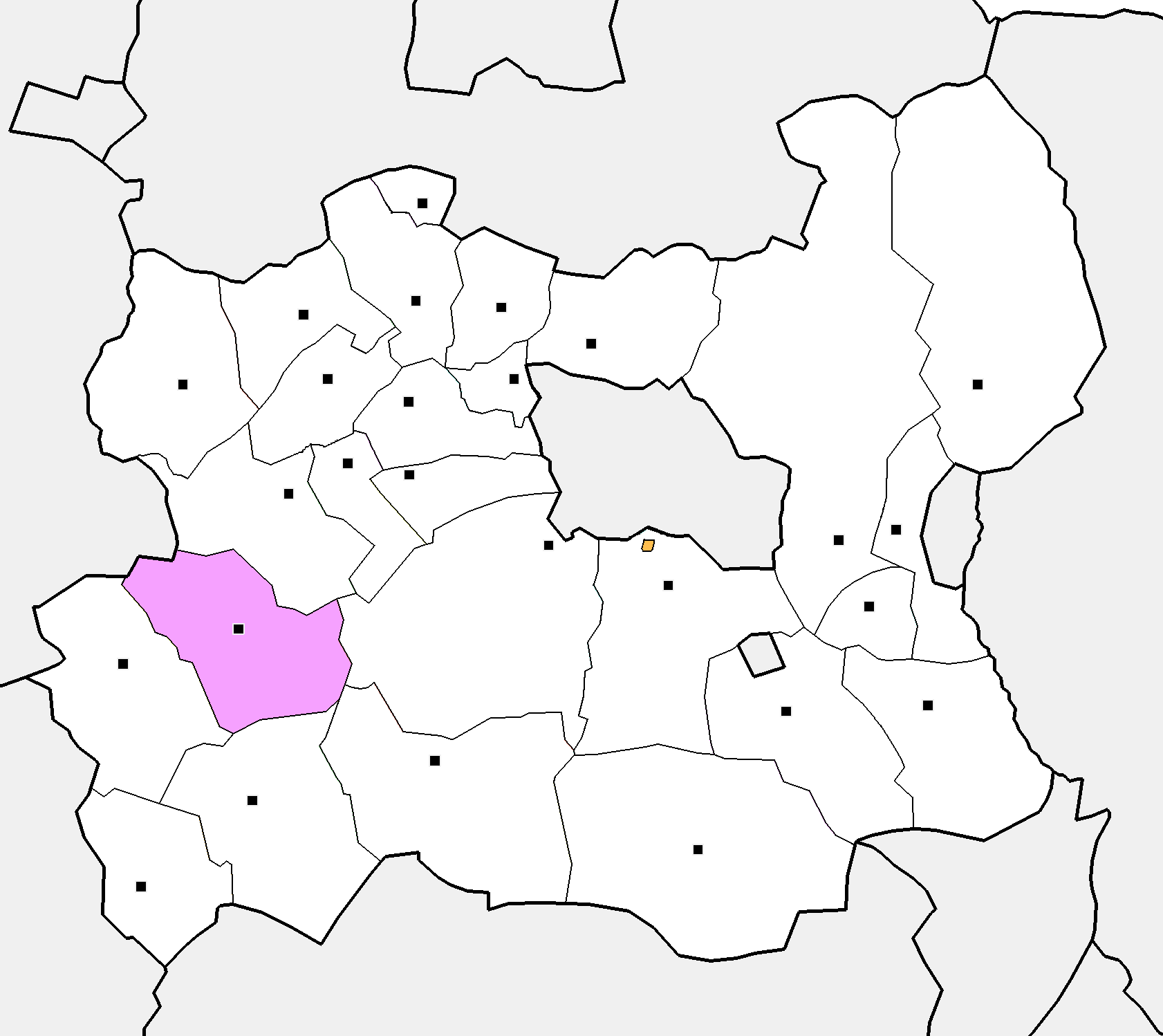
- Country: Mongolia
- Province: Töv Province
- Time zone: UTC+8 (UTC + 8)

Öndörshireet (Mongolian: Өндөрширээт) is a sum of Töv Province in Mongolia. Sum center former location was 47 28 N 104 52 E.

== Geography ==
Öndörshireet has a total area of 2,712 km^{2}.

== Administrative divisions ==
The district is divided into four bags, which are:

- Bayantuul
- Khairkhan
- Sant
- Uyanga
