= Tseel, Töv =

District in Töv, Mongolia

Coordinates: 48°27′18″N 105°18′59″E

Tseel District Цээл сум ᠴᠡᠭᠡᠯᠰᠤᠮᠤ
- District
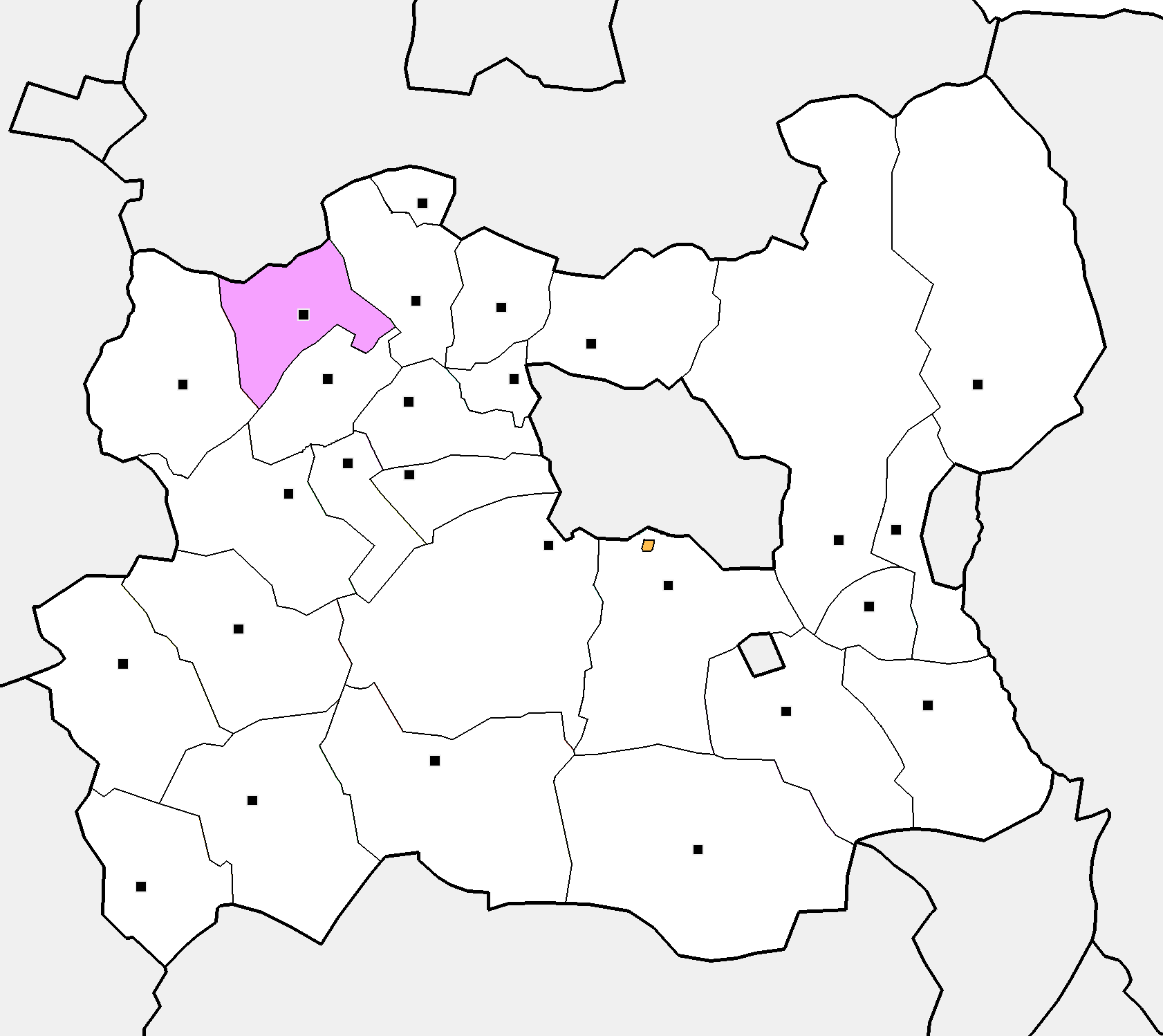
- Country: Mongolia
- Province: Töv Province
- Time zone: UTC+8 (UTC + 8)

Tseel (Mongolian: Цээл "Deep Water Pool") is a sum of Töv Province in Mongolia.

== Geography ==
Tseel has a total area of 1,600 km^{2}.

== Administrative divisions ==
The district is divided into five bags, which are:

- Khuujei Khan
- Maikhan
- Orgil
- Suul Buga
- Taliin Khairkhan
