= Sergelen, Töv =

District in Töv, Mongolia

Coordinates: 47°36′40″N 107°01′22″E

Sergelen District Сэргэлэн сум ᠰᠡᠷᠭᠦᠯᠡᠩᠰᠤᠮᠤ
- District
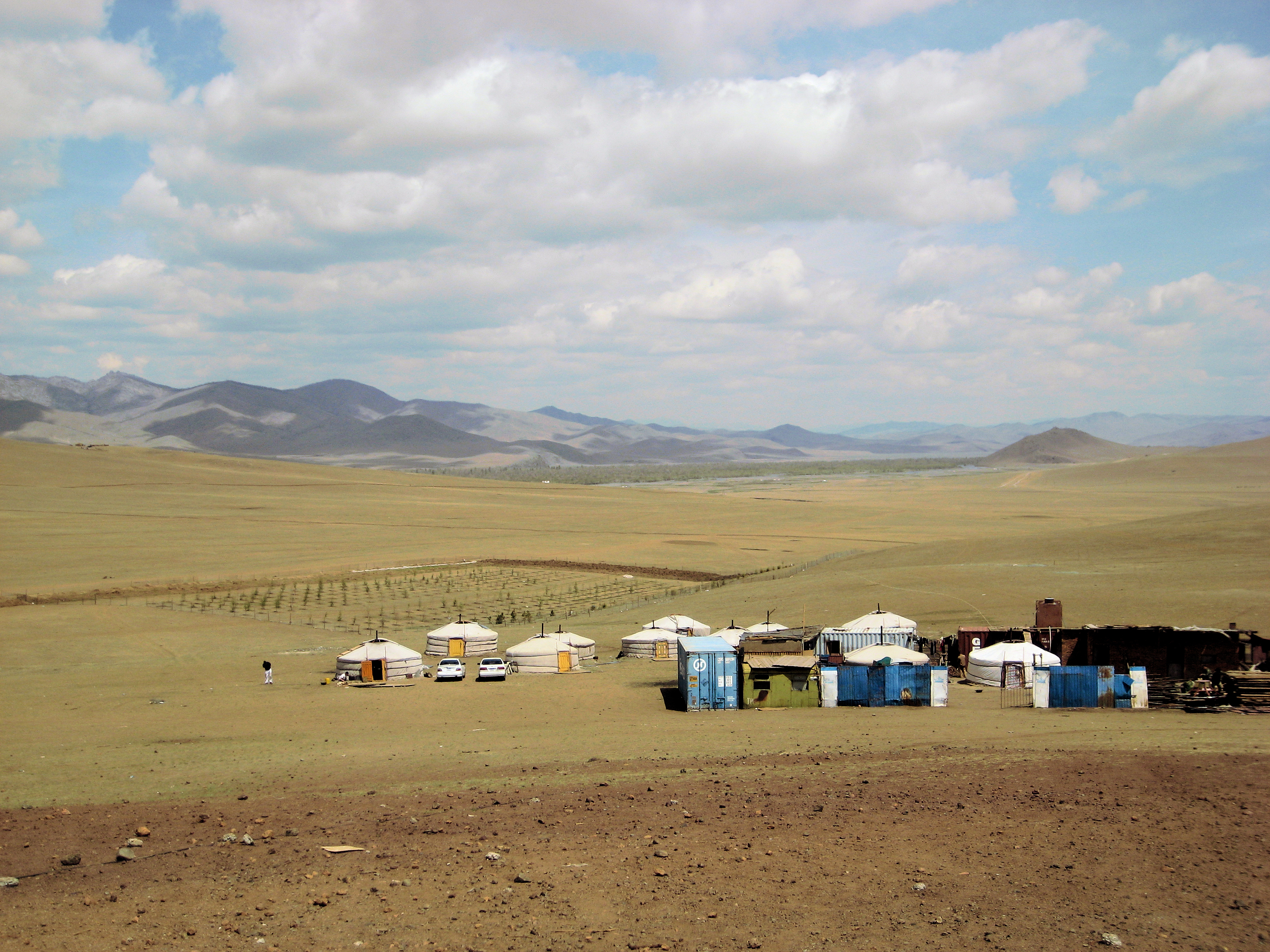
- Settlement on the steppes of Sergelen

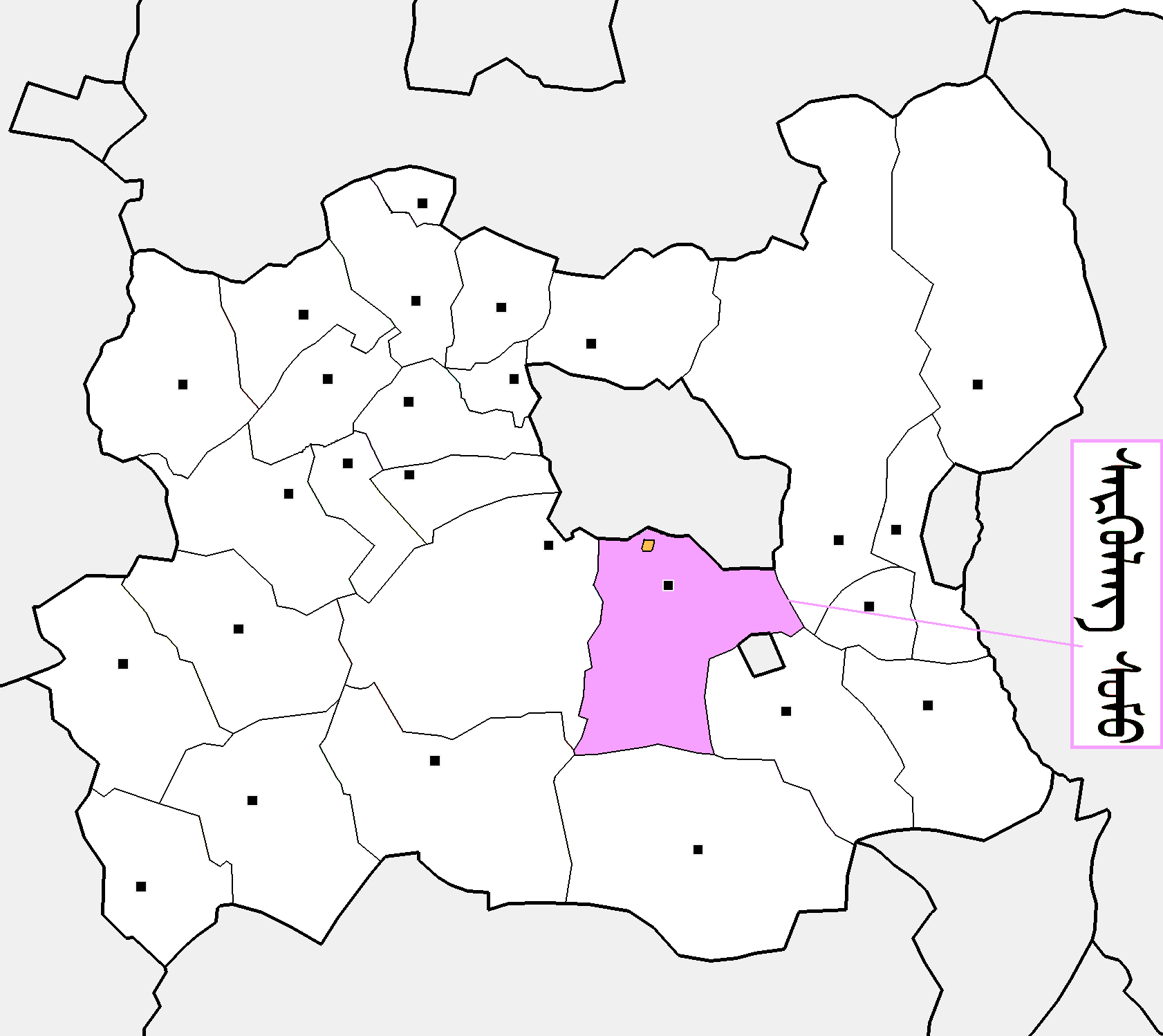
- Sergelen District in Töv Province
- Country: Mongolia
- Province: Töv Province
- Time zone: UTC+8 (UTC + 8)

Sergelen (Mongolian: Сэргэлэн ᠰᠡᠷᠭᠦᠯᠡᠩ [sírk(ɘ)ɮɘɴ]) is a district of Töv Province in Mongolia.

== Administrative divisions ==
The district is divided into five bags, which are:

- Avdar
- Bayanburd
- Erdene-Uul
- Khairkhan
- Khushig

== Infrastructure ==
- Sermsang Khushig Khundii Solar Power Plant

== Transportation ==
Khöshigt Valley, located in Sergelen, is the location of Chinggis Khaan International Airport, which started its operations in 2021. The airport, built with a loan from the Japanese Government, has a capacity twice that of Buyant-Ukhaa International Airport, and has a highway connection to Ulaanbaatar. It is also planned to build the modern city of 100,000 population by the airport.
