= Erdenesant =

District in Töv, Mongolia

Coordinates: 47°19′48″N 104°29′39″E

Erdenesant District Эрдэнэсант сум ᠡᠷᠳᠡᠨᠡᠰᠠᠩᠲᠤᠰᠤᠮᠤ
- District
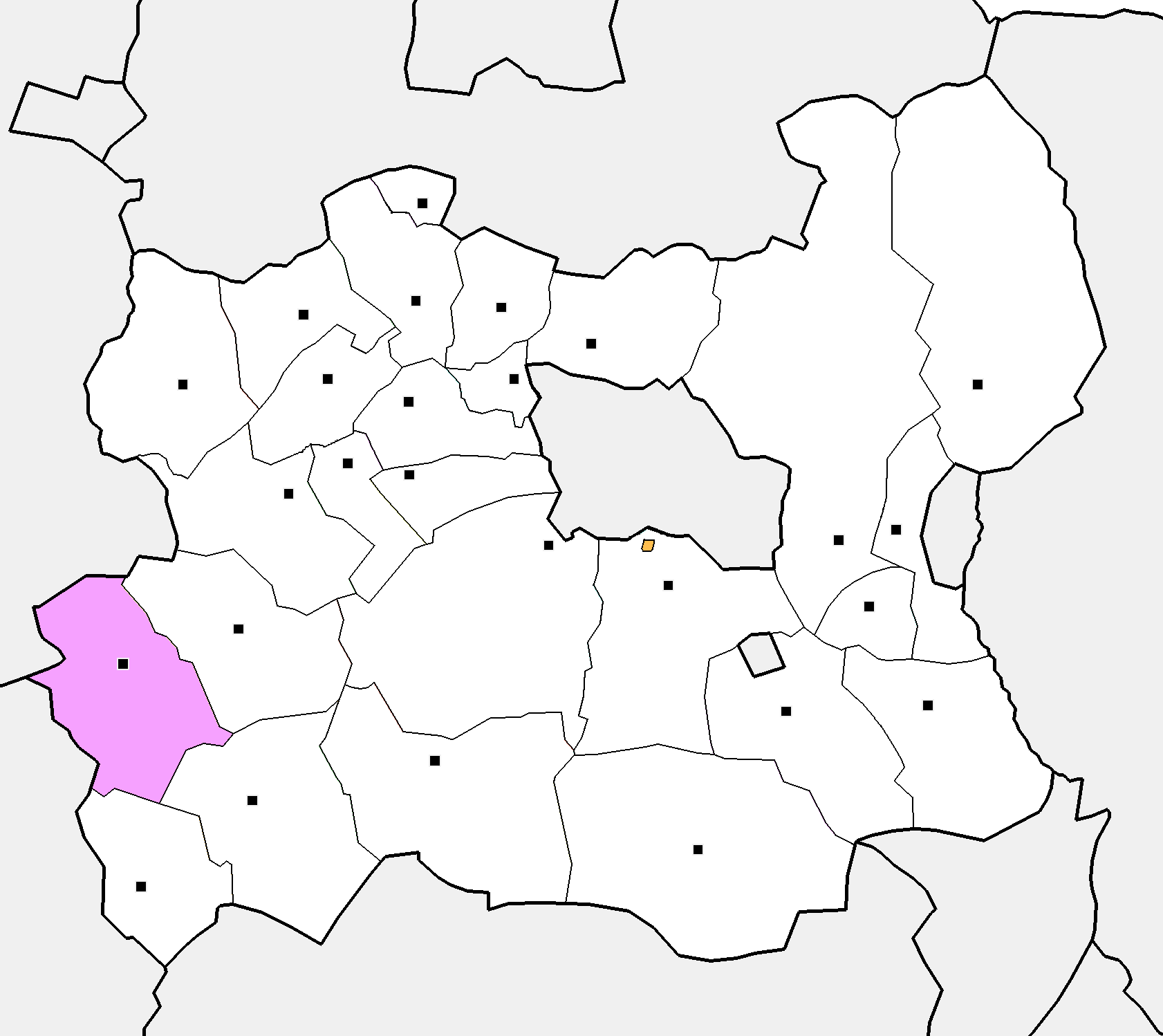
- Country: Mongolia
- Province: Töv Province
- Time zone: UTC+8 (UTC + 8)

Erdenesant (Mongolian: Эрдэнэсант "Precious Peak/Saint") is a sum of Töv Province in Mongolia.

== Geography ==
Erdenesant has a total area of 3,024 km^{2}. It is the western most district in the province.

== Administrative divisions ==
The district is divided into five bags, which are:

- Bargilt
- Bayan-Uul
- Buyant
- Ugalzat
- Ulaankhudag
