= Argalant =

District in Töv, Mongolia

Coordinates: 47°56′29″N 105°53′51″E

Argalant District Аргалант сум ᠠᠷᠭᠠᠯᠠᠩᠲᠤᠰᠤᠮᠤ
- District
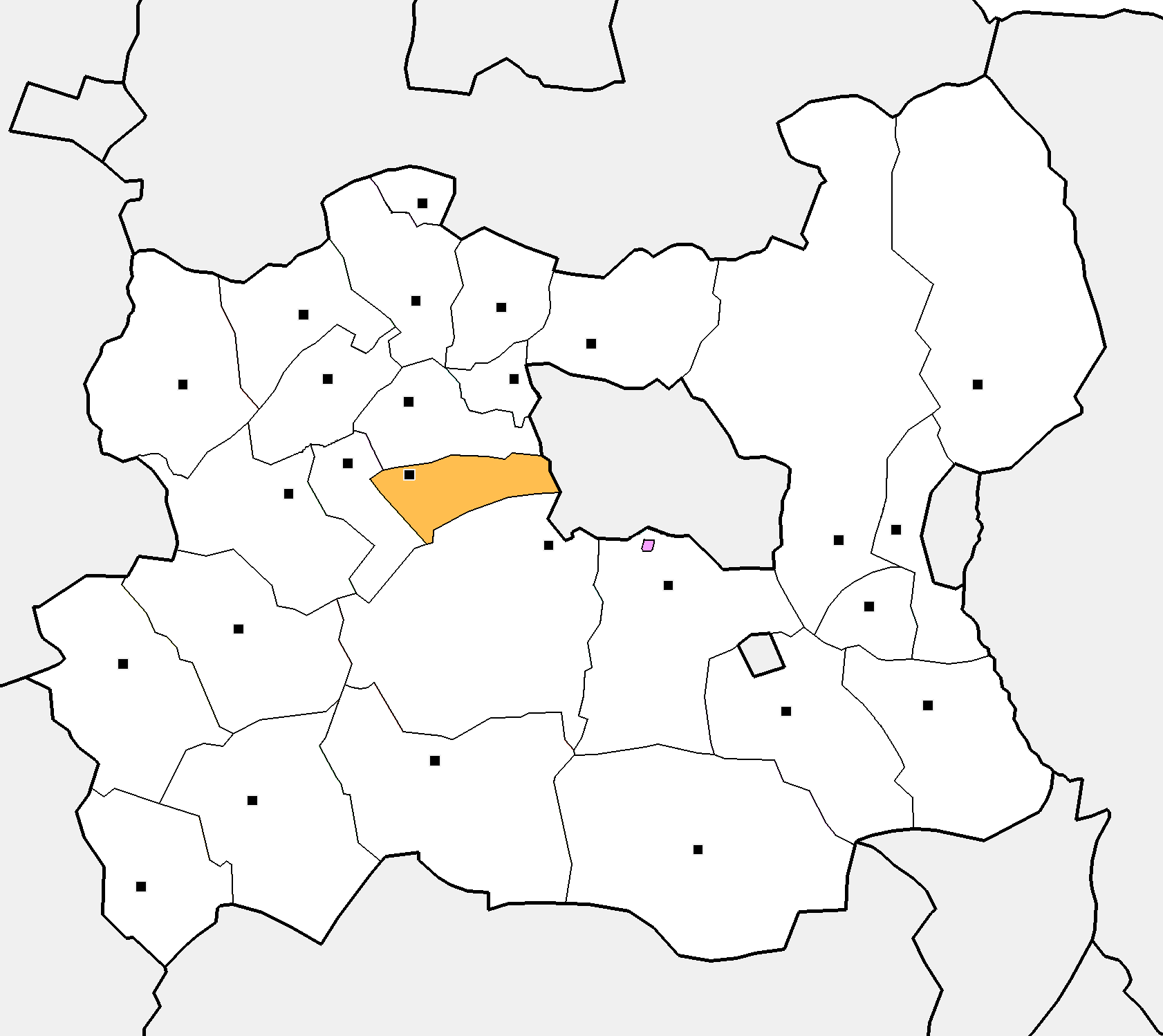
- Country: Mongolia
- Province: Töv Province
- Time zone: UTC+8 (UTC + 8)
- Area code: +976 (0) 2742

Argalant (Mongolian: Аргалант) is a sum in Mongolia's Töv Province, just west of Ulaanbaatar. The area is 1210 square kilometres, of which about 160 square kilometres are farmland and 940 square kilometres are pasture. In 2005, the sum had 1892 inhabitants in 387 households. Distance from sum center to Ulaanbaatar is 82 km. The sum was founded in 1977, in the first year of Mongolia's second Virgin Soils campaign.

== Administrative divisions ==
The district is divided into two bags, which are:

- Argaliin Uul
- Khushuut

== Economy and Livestock ==
Main sectors of the economy are livestock herding, farming, trade and tourism. In 2004, the sum housed roughly 44,000 heads of livestock, including 18,000 goats, 20,000 sheep, 2,200 heads of cattle, 4,000 horses and 6 camels.
