= Bayan-Önjüül =

District in Töv, Mongolia

Coordinates: 47°02′19″N 105°57′23″E

Bayan-Önjüül District Баян-Өнжүүл сум ᠪᠠᠶ᠋ᠠᠨᠥᠨᠵᠢᠭᠦᠯᠰᠤᠮᠤ
- District
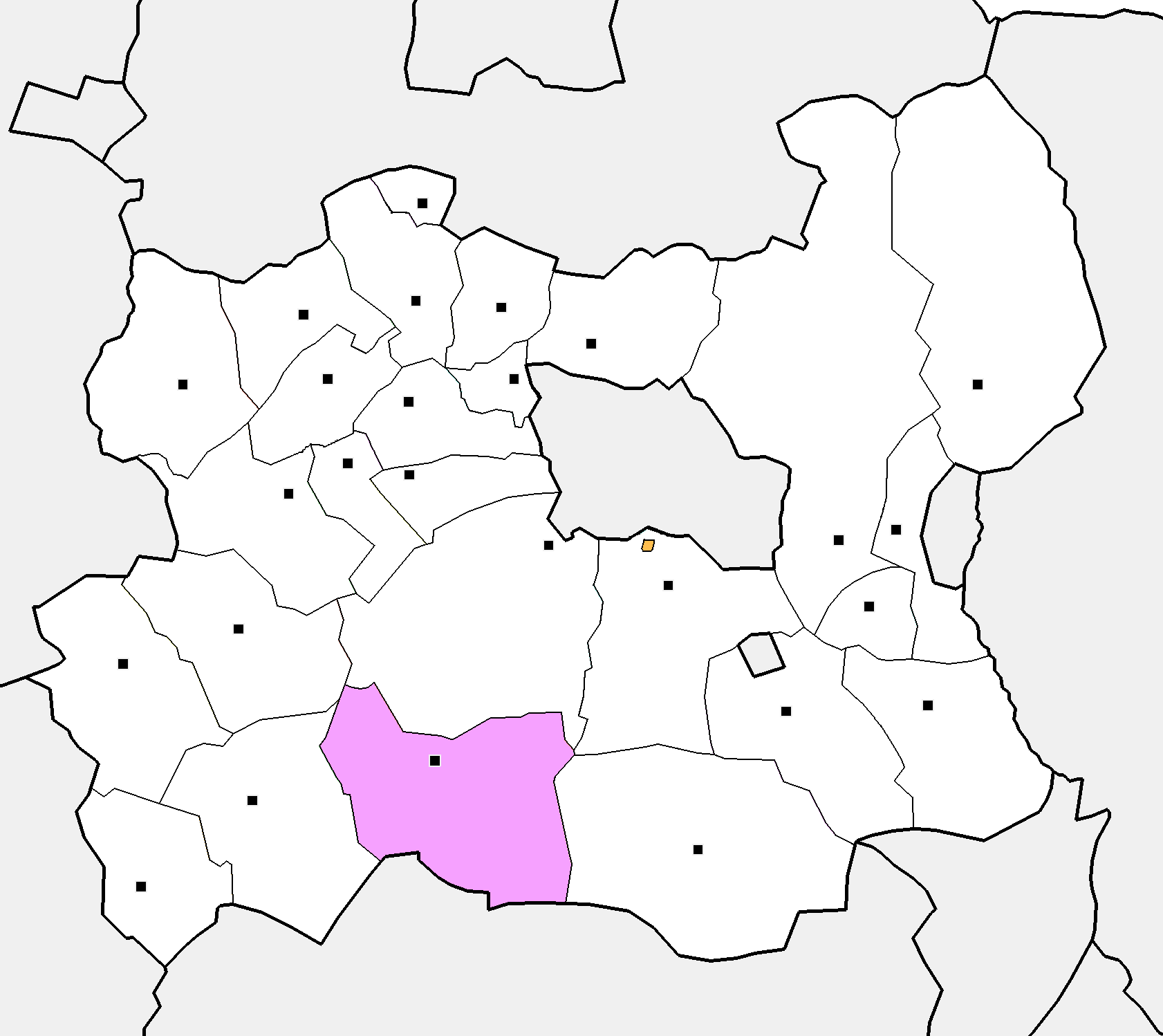
- Country: Mongolia
- Province: Töv Province
- Time zone: UTC+8 (UTC + 8)

Bayan-Önjüül (Mongolian: Баян-Өнжүүл [páiˑɴ ɵɲt͡ɕúɬ]) is a district of Töv Province in Mongolia. The now-abandoned (Bayan-)Baraat settlement is 30 km south-east from Bayan-Önjüül.

== Geography ==
The district (or sum) has a total area of 4,790 km^{2}.

== Administrative divisions ==
The district is divided into three bags, which are:

- Baraat
- Burd
- Tseel
