= Bayanchandmani =

District in Töv, Mongolia

Coordinates: 48°13′31″N 106°17′29″E

Bayanchandmani District Баянчандмань сум ᠪᠠᠶ᠋ᠠᠨᠴᠢᠨᠳᠠᠮᠠᠨᠢᠰᠤᠮᠤ
- District
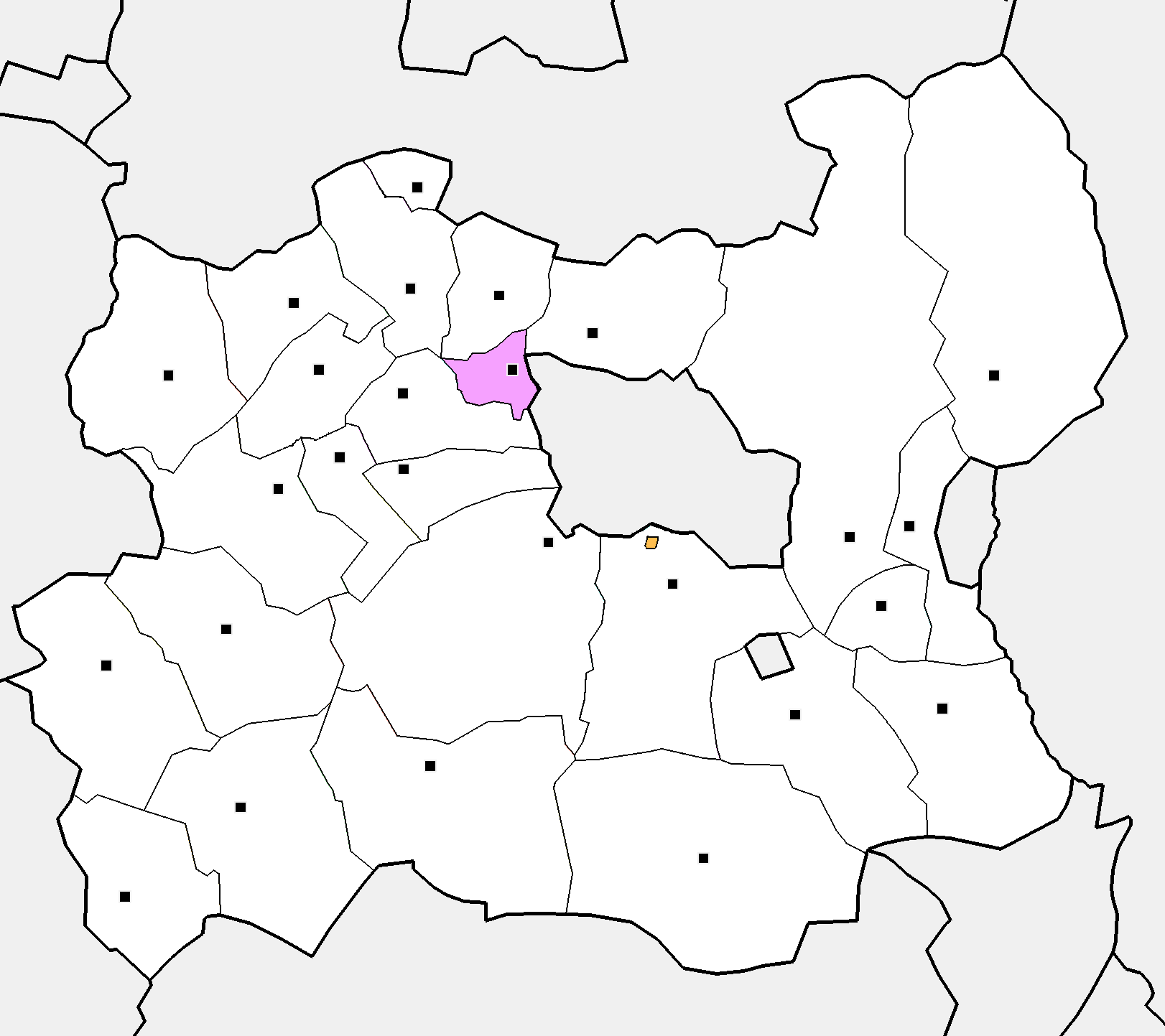
- Country: Mongolia
- Province: Töv Province
- Time zone: UTC+8 (UTC + 8)

Bayanchandmani (Mongolian: Баянчандмань) is a sum of Töv Province in Mongolia. It lies on the main road going west and then north from the national capital.

In 2011, the population was 3,783.

== Administrative divisions ==
The district is divided into three bags, which are:

- Chandmani
- Erdene
- Zamt
