= Bayankhangai =

District in Töv, Mongolia

Coordinates: 47°57′05″N 105°32′48″E

Bayankhangai District Баянхангай сум ᠪᠠᠶ᠋ᠠᠩᠬᠠᠩᠭ᠋ᠠᠢᠰᠤᠮᠤ
- District
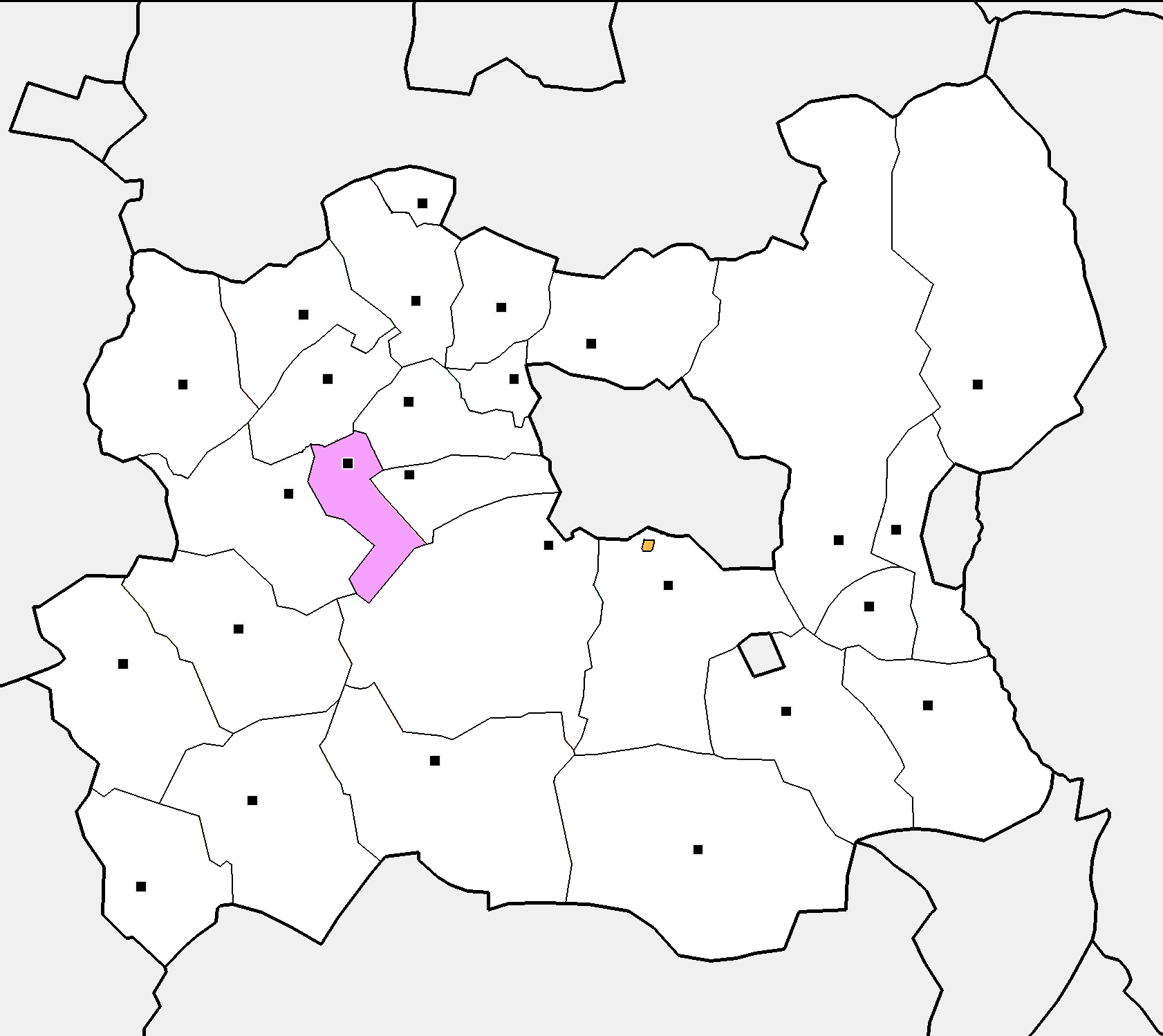
- Country: Mongolia
- Province: Töv Province
- Time zone: UTC+8 (UTC + 8)

Bayankhangai (Mongolian: Баянхангай, Rich Khangai) is a sum of Töv Province in Mongolia. Khangai (Mongolian: Хангай) provident lord, munificent king, generous gracious lord or bountiful king

== Geography ==
The district has a total area of 1,036 km^{2}.

== Administrative divisions ==
The district is divided into two bags, which are:

- Khushuut
- Nairamdal
