= Altanbulag, Töv =

District of Töv, Mongolia

Coordinates: 47°41′54″N 106°24′21″E

Altanbulag District Алтанбулаг сум ᠠᠯᠲᠠᠨᠪᠤᠯᠠᠭᠰᠤᠮᠤ
- Sum
- Flag

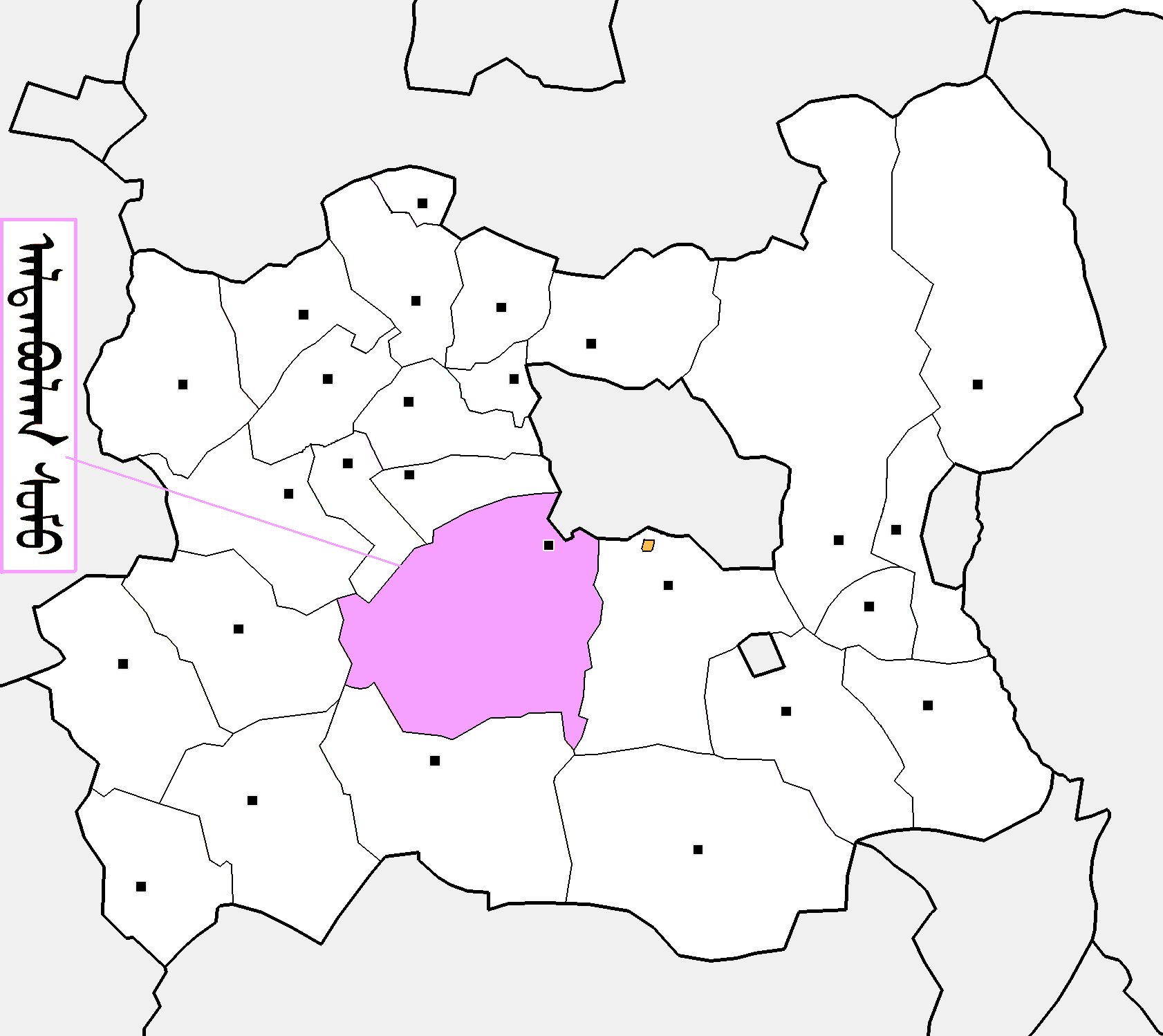
- Country: Mongolia
- Province: Töv Province

Area
  - Total: 5,668 km^{2} (2,188 sq mi)

Population
  - Total: 3,024
- Time zone: UTC+8 (UTC + 8)
- Area code: +976 (0)2741

Altanbulag (Mongolian: Алтанбулаг; lit. 'Golden Spring') is a sum of Töv Province in Mongolia.

== History ==
The original sum was established in 1936. The current sum was established in 1959.

== Geography ==
The sum has a total area of 5,668 km^{2} at an altitude of 1,260 meters above sea level.

== Administrative divisions ==
The district is divided into four bags, which are:

- Altan-Ovoo
- Argal
- Sumt
- Zamt

== Demographics ==
The sum has a total population of 3,024 residents.
