= Töv Province =

Province of Mongolia

Töv Province Төв аймаг ᠲᠥᠪ ᠠᠢᠮᠠᠭ
- Province
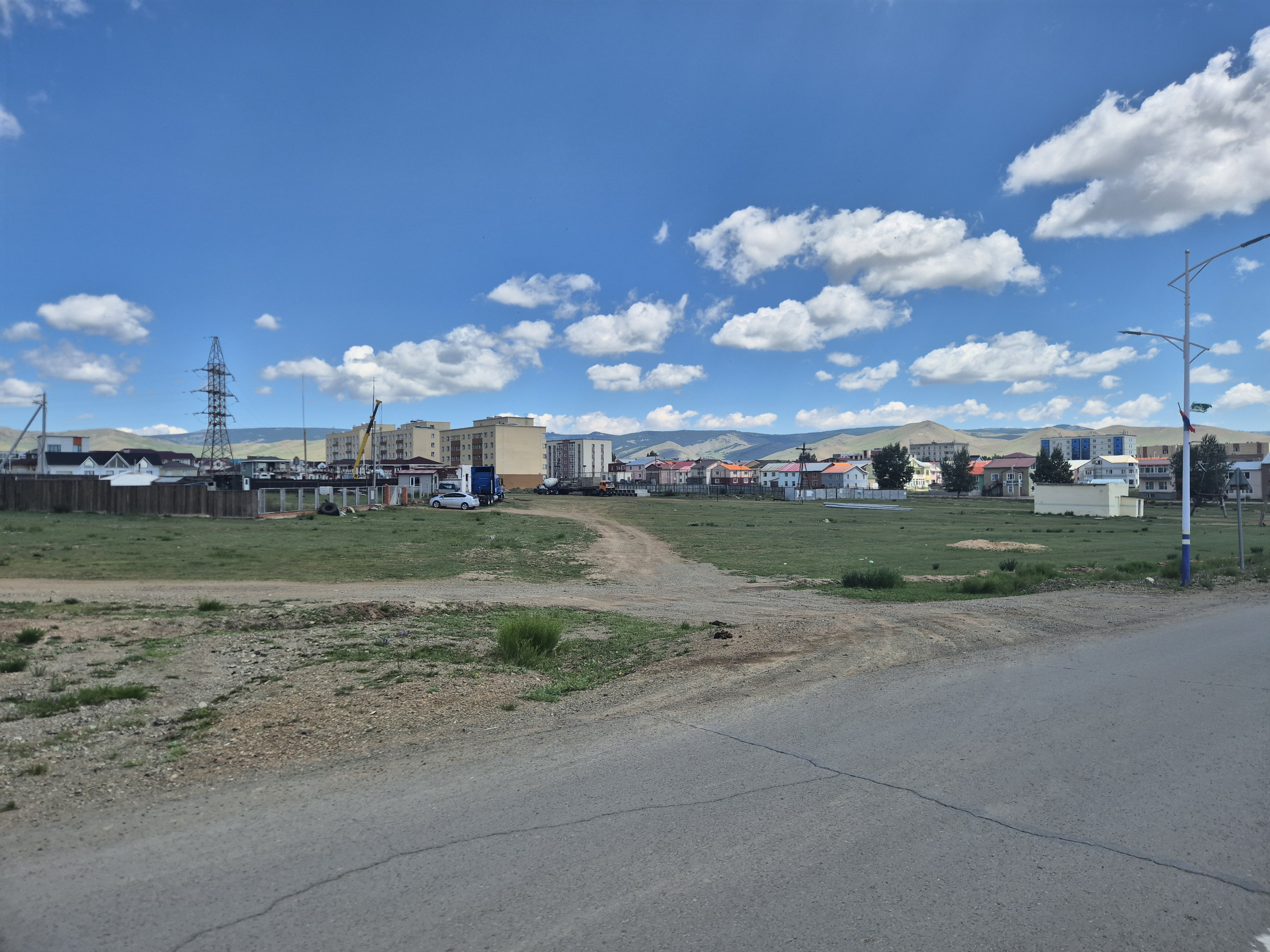
- Zuunmod, the capital of Töv Province

- Flag Seal

- Coordinates: 47°30′N 106°15′E
- Country: Mongolia
- Established: 1931
- Capital: Zuunmod

Area
  - Total: 74,042.37 km^{2} (28,587.92 sq mi)

Population (2025)
  - Total: 94,057
  - Density: 1.2703/km^{2} (3.2901/sq mi)

GDP
  - Total: ▲MNT 1.347 trillion US$ 374.76 million (2025)
  - Per capita: ▲MNT 14,560,300; US$ 4,049.25 (2025)
- Time zone: UTC+8
- Area code: +976 (0)127
- ISO 3166 code: MN-047
- Vehicle registration: ТӨ_
- Website: tov.gov.mn

Töv Province (from Mongolian төв [tʰөw̜] 'centre') is one of the 21 provinces of Mongolia. The national capital Ulaanbaatar is located roughly at its center, but the city itself is administered as an independent municipality.

== Geography ==
The province (aimag) includes the western part of the Khentii Mountains, the mountains around the capital, as well as rolling steppe in the south and west. The most interesting body of water is the Tuul River, which crosses Ulaanbaatar and later joins the Orkhon River.

== Population ==
Töv Province is populated primarily by Khalkha Mongols, followed by Kazakhs, Buryats, and Dörbet Oirats.

Ethnic groups in Töv aimag (self-identification) 1989, 2000 census
Group	Population Census 1989	Percentage Census 1989	Population Census 2000	Percentage Census 2000
Khalkha	94,773	94.6%	93,604	94.2%
Kazakh	2,167	2.2%	1,065	1.1%
Buryat	590	0.6%	856	0.9%
Do'rbet	727	0.7%	770	0.8%
Bayid	317	0.3%	745	0.8%
Uriankhai	420	0.4%	524	0.5%
Tuvan	269	0.23%	500	0.5%
Zakhchin	160	0.2%	202	0.2%
Ööled	61	0.1%	171	0.2%
other	420	0.4%	614	0.6%
foreigners	179	0.2%	217	0.2%
Total population	100,088	100%	99,266	100%

== Traffic ==
The central traffic node is the enclave Ulaanbaatar. The city includes the largest station of the Trans-Mongolian Railway and the Buyant-Ukhaa International Airport. A small airport with an unpaved runway also exists in the aimag capital Zuunmod.

== Culture ==
Manjusri Monastery is located near Zuunmod in the Bogd Khan Mountain national park. It was founded in 1733 and used to be the home of 20 temples and 300 monks. Most of it was destroyed by the communists, yet the last temple was restored after democratisation and hosts a small museum today.

== National parks ==
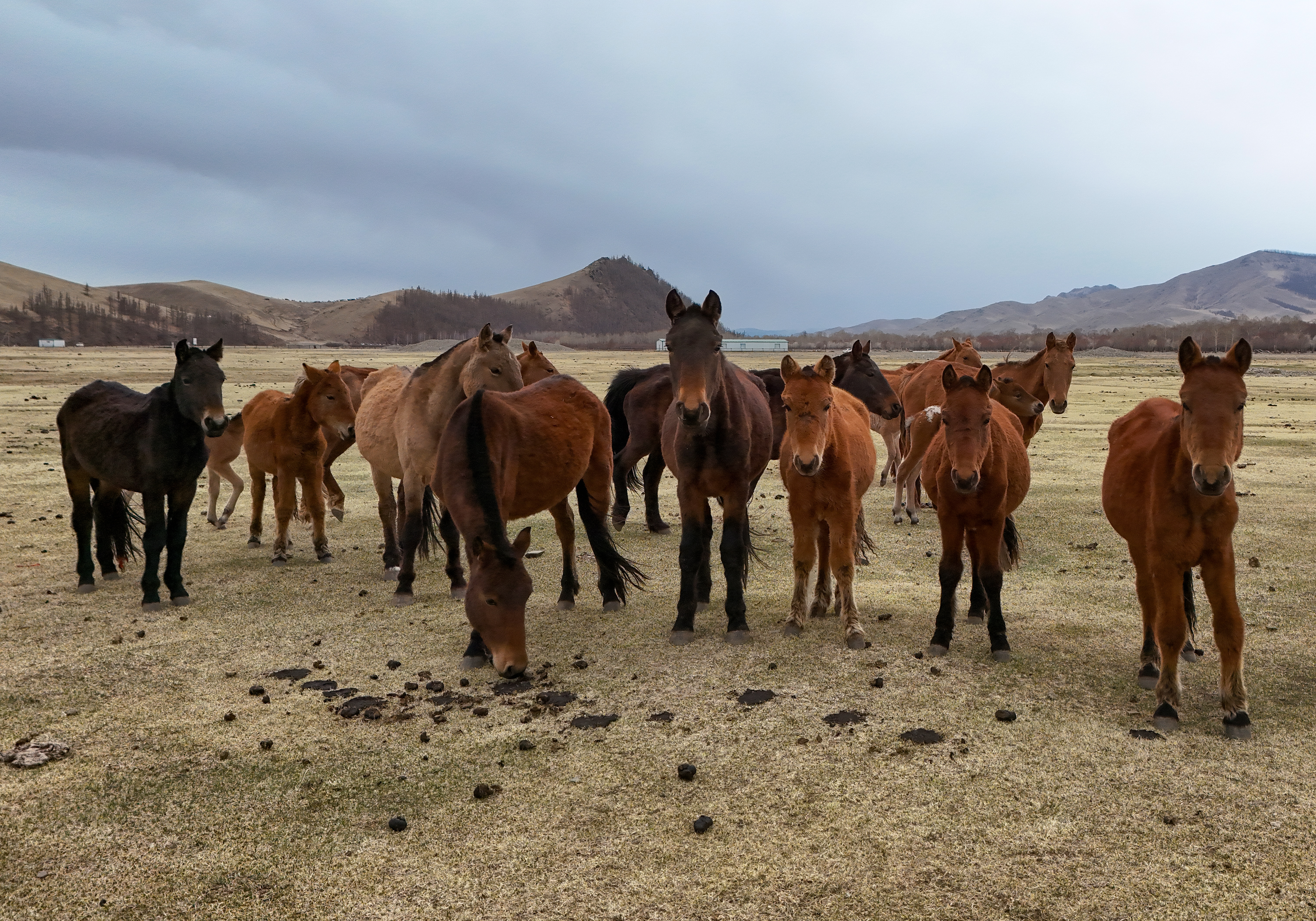
Mongolian horses in Erdene

The Gorkhi-Terelj National Park was founded in 1993. It covers a part of the Khentii Mountains. It is most well known for its spectacular rock formations, including a rock that looks like a giant turtle from the right perspective. The landscape has an alpine character, with larch and pine forests, sparkling mountain rivers, and very diverse flora and fauna.

In Khustain Nuruu National Park, about 120 km south west of Ulaanbaatar, the original wild horses, Takhi of Mongolia (Przewalski horses) have been released to the wild again in a process first begun in 1993. The project has been quite successful, and has developed into an attraction for both scientists and tourists.

The Gun-Galuut Nature Reserve is a protected area founded in 2003 to conserve globally threatened species and their habitat. The IUCN red-listed species - white-naped crane, hooded crane, Siberian white crane, swan goose and argali-wild mountain sheep and many other species listed in the National Red book of Mongolia are found here.

Because it is considered sacred, the mountain Mount Bogd Khan south of Ulaanbaatar has been a protected area since 1778. During socialism, it was formally established as a national park. This stopped the urban sprawl of the capital on its southern side.

== Maidar City ==
In Sergelen, the urban development project Maidar City is planned to relieve the Mongolian capital Ulaanbaatar. This project will multiply the population of this aimag.

== Administrative subdivisions ==
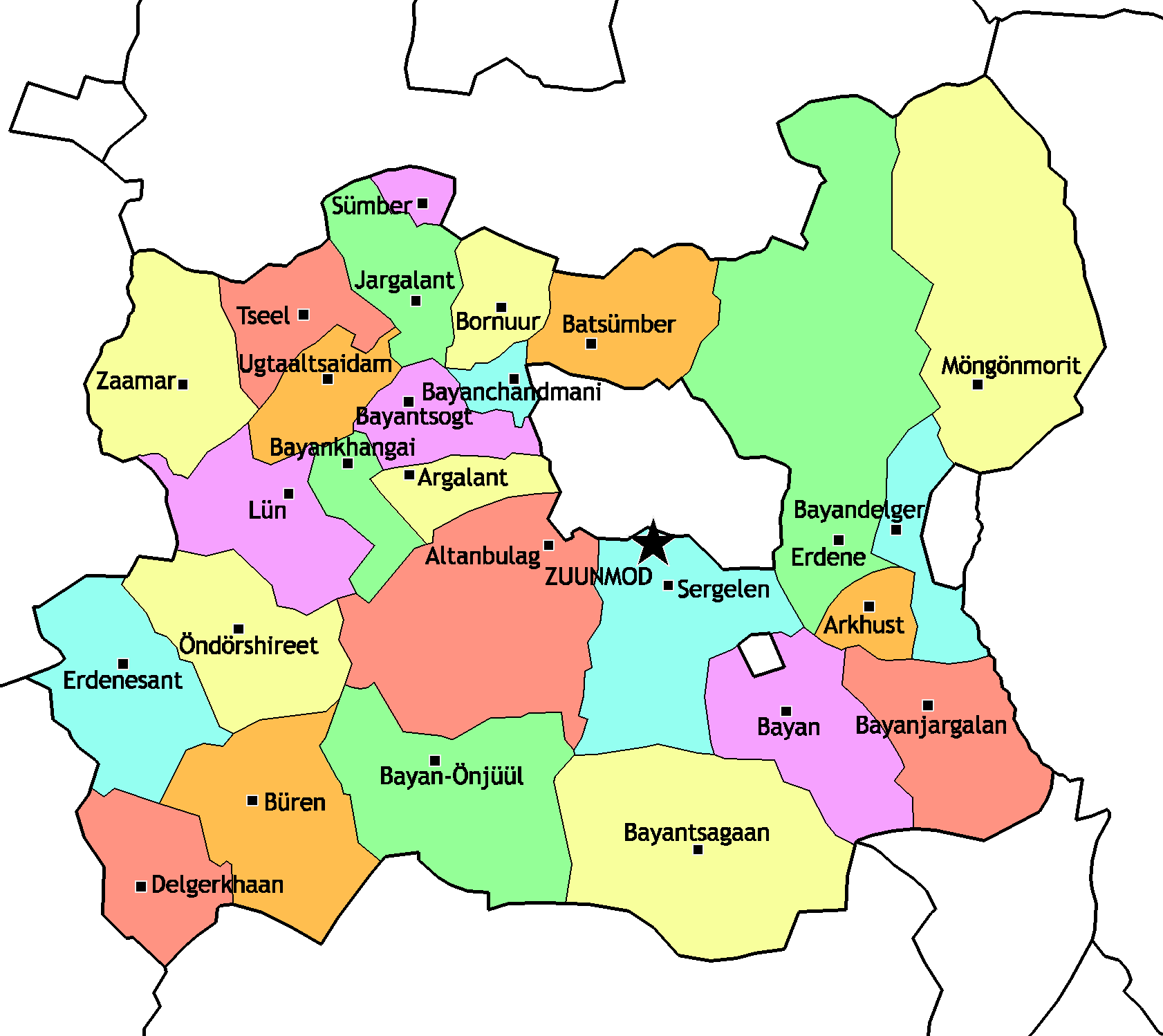
Sums of Töv

The Sums of Töv Aimag
Sum	Mongolian	Population 1980	Population 1986	Population 1992	Population 1998	Population 2005	Population 2007	
Sum	Mongolian	Population 1980	Population 1986	Population 1992	Population 1998	Population 2005	total	sum center
Altanbulag	Алтанбулаг	2,701	2,857	3,357	3,622	3,104	3,079	1,427
Argalant	Аргалант	1,530	1,941	2,689	2,505	1,892	1,955	916
Arkhust	Архуст	1,431	2,006	2,260	2,086	1,671	1,371	516
Batsümber	Батсүмбэр	5,390	5,810	6,505	6,786	6,358	6,525	2,325
Bayan	Баян	2,847	3,385	2,903	2,575	2,062	2,093	1,166
Bayan-Önjüül	Баян-Өнжүүл	2,759	2,621	2,918	2,817	2,538	2,560	579
Bayanchandmani	Баянчандмань	3,244	4,059	4,769	3,641	3,268	3,322	1,311
Bayandelger	Баяндэлгэр	2,506	2,600	2,655	2,203	1,226	1,165	580
Bayanjargalan	Баянжаргалан	1,377	1,302	1,718	1,788	1,583	1,623	609
Bayankhangai	Баянхангай	1,357	2,062	2,270	1,693	1,498	1,401	746
Bayantsagaan	Баянцагаан	2,128	2,236	2,683	2,737	2,369	2,173	988
Bayantsogt	Баянцогт	3,505	3,575	3,987	3,406	1,890	2,020	958
Bornuur	Борнуур	3,816	4,031	5,145	4,454	4,372	4,693	3,233
Büren	Бүрэн	2,714	2,718	3,452	3,624	3,303	3,209	614
Delgerkhaan	Дэлгэрхаан	2,006	1,867	2,294	2,499	2,033	2,016	635
Erdene	Эрдэнэ	4,523	4,365	4,067	3,485	3,424	3,607	1,398
Erdenesant	Эрдэнэсант	3,472	4,735	5,757	5,855	5,011	5,010	1,893
Jargalant	Жаргалант	4,218	4,941	6,038	5,975	5,798	5,781	2,156
Lün	Лүн	2,644	2,400	3,245	3,151	2,595	2,515	1,302
Möngönmorit	Мөнгөнморьт	2,091	2,099	2,363	2,197	1,923	1,902	908
Öndörshireet	Өндөрширээт	2,111	2,112	2,471	2,525	1,927	2,006	582
Sergelen	Сэргэлэн	2,490	2,280	2,831	2,422	1,855	1,884	199
Sümber	Сүмбэр	1,133	1,608	2,265	2,210	1,637	1,646	690
Tseel	Цээл	2,318	2,728	3,605	3,988	2,513	2,352	1,568
Ugtaal	Угтаал	3,366	4,003	5,007	4,139	2,397	2,274	1,413
Zaamar	Заамар	2,354	3,030	4,002	5,645	5,721	5,816	1,494
Zuunmod	Зуунмод	9,649	12,739	20,285	16,037	14,600	14,830	14,568

== Economy ==
In 2018, the province contributed to 1.85% of the total national GDP of Mongolia.
