= Selbe River =

River in Mongolia

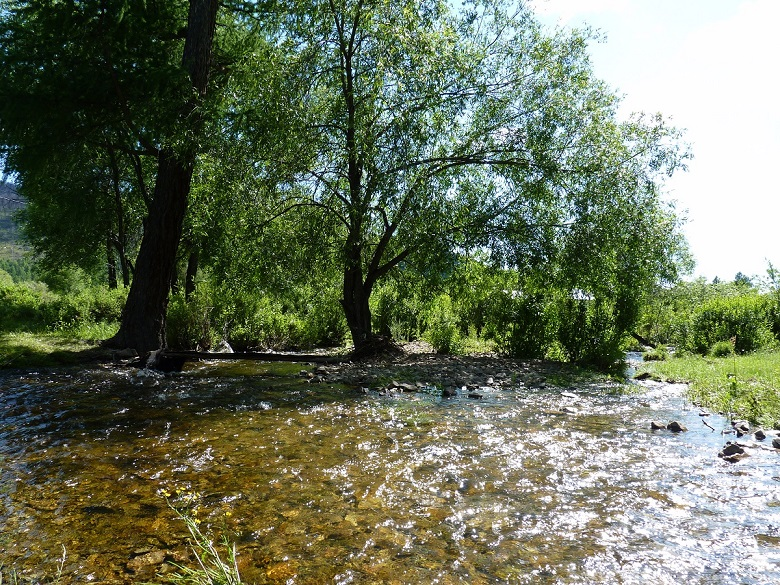
- River origin
- Native name: Сэлбэ гол (Mongolian)

Location
- Country: Mongolia
- City: Ulaanbaatar

Physical characteristics
- Source
  - location: Khan Khentii Strictly Protected Area, Khentii Mountains
  - coordinates: 48.1485°N 106.8811°E
- Mouth: Orkhon River
  - coordinates: 47.8837°N 106.8144°E

The Selbe River (Mongolian: Сэлбэ) is a river in central Mongolia. It flows at an altitude between 1850 and 1350 meters above sea level through the southern part of the Khentii Mountains. This river is 26.2 km long and the river basin covers 220 square kilometers.

The river flows through the Mongolian capital Ulaanbaatar and merges into the Tuul River. The inner-Ulaanbaatar Selbe basin was renovated in 2012. Before this reconstruction, the river was mostly dry during colder seasons. In the same year, the river parts in Ulaanbaatar area were declared protected status to protect against city pollutions.

In 2025, a retaining wall is being constructed along the bank of the river section that passes through Ulaanbaatar for flood mitigation. The wall is 1.4-km long and 4.5-meter high made of reinforced concrete.

== See also ==
- List of rivers of Mongolia
