= Burial place of Genghis Khan =

Undetermined site and source of mystery

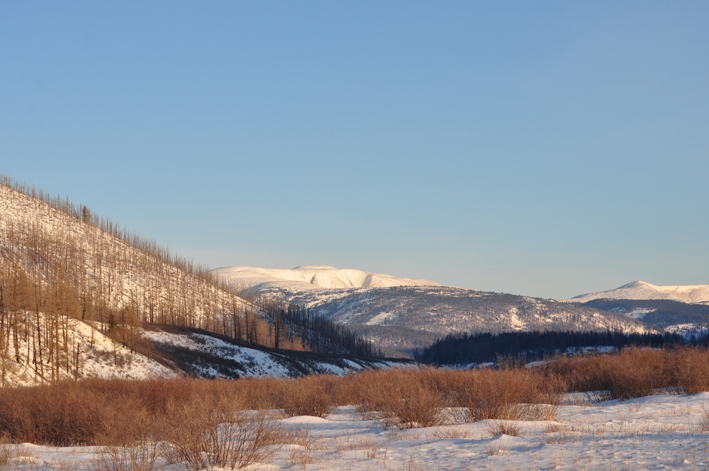
Burkhan Khaldun is a sacred mountain in Mongol culture that was venerated by Genghis Khan

The burial place of Genghis Khan is where the Mongol leader was laid to rest following his death in August 1227. Although the location of his grave has been the subject of much speculation and research, the site remains undiscovered. It is generally believed to be in the vicinity of the Mongol's sacred mountain Burkhan Khaldun in the Khentii Mountains.

Genghis Khan is said to have asked his sons - shortly before his death - to conceal his burial site. A legend states the slaves that built the grave were killed by their guards, who in turn were killed by a second group of soldiers, who then killed anyone who saw them; they then committed suicide to ensure no living person knew where Genghis Khan was buried. Despite this, other legends state that his grave was found years later.

Numerous searches have attempted to locate the grave site. Recent ones have employed technology like drones. However, due to the holiness of Burkhan Khaldun, expeditions face difficulty from Mongol culture. The Genghis Khan Mausoleum in modern-day Inner Mongolia is not his burial site.

== Historical accounts ==
According to legend, Genghis Khan asked to be buried without markings or any sign, and after he died, his body was returned to present-day Mongolia.

The Secret History of the Mongols has the year of Genghis Khan's death (1227) but no information concerning his burial. Marco Polo wrote that, even by the late 13th century, the Mongols did not know the location of the tomb. According to The Travels of Marco Polo, "It has been an invariable custom, that all the grand khans, and chiefs of the race of Genghis-khan, should be carried for interment to a certain lofty mountain named Altai, and in whatever place they may happen to die, although it should be at the distance of a hundred days' journey, they are nevertheless conveyed thither."

In a frequently recounted myth, Marco Polo tells that the 2,000 slaves that attended to Genghis Khan's funeral were killed by the soldiers sent to guard them, and that these soldiers were in turn killed by another group of soldiers which killed anyone and anything that crossed their path, in order to conceal where Genghis was buried. Finally, the myth states that once these soldiers reached their destination they committed suicide. This myth does not appear in contemporaneous sources, however.

Another folkloric legend meanwhile says that a river was diverted over Genghis Khan's grave to make it impossible to find, echoing the myth of the burial of the Sumerian King Gilgamesh of Uruk or of the Visigoth leader Alaric. Other tales state that his grave was stampeded over by many horses, that trees were then planted over the site, and that the permafrost also played its part in the hiding of the burial site. The Erdeni Tobchi (1662) claims that Genghis Khan's coffin may have been empty when it arrived in Mongolia. Similarly, the Altan Tobchi (1604) maintains that only his shirt, tent and boots were buried at the mausoleum in the Ordos.

Another legend states the grave was re-discovered 30 years after Genghis Khan's death. According to this tale, a young camel was buried with the Khan, and the camel's mother was later found weeping at the grave of its young. Japanese archeologist Shinpei Kato has likewise recounted the tale of the burial of the baby camel, so the parent could lead the Khan's family to the tomb when needed, as being documented in at least one ancient Chinese text.

According to the tradition of the Yuan dynasty, all the great khans of the Mongols were buried in the area around Genghis Khan's tomb. The site's name in Chinese was Qinian Valley (起輦谷). However, the concrete location of the valley is never mentioned in any documents.

== Possible locations ==
Burkhan Khaldun was the sacred place where Genghis Khan went to pray to the sky god Tengri before embarking on his campaign to unite the Mongols and other steppe peoples. After the rise of the Mongol Empire, it then became known as Ikh Khorig, or the Great Taboo, with only the Mongol royal family, or golden family, being permitted entry to the area. In all, a 240 square-kilometre area was sealed off by the Mongols, with trespassing being punishable by death. Even in the Soviet era, the area remained restricted out of fear that the mountain could once again become a site of pilgrimage or a focus for Mongol national identity.

The Ikh Khorig has also been reported as being traditionally guarded by an Uriankhai tribe called the Darkhad that were exempted by the Mongols from taxes and military service. Such guarding of an imperial grave site "undermines the folkloric suggestion that the soldiers who witnessed the funeral were executed".

=== Investigative expeditions ===
In 1920, the French diplomat Saint-John Perse led an unrelated expedition through Mongolia with Chinese Post general director, Henri Picard Destelan and Dr. Jean-Augustin Bussière, in the footsteps of Genghis Khan.

In 2001, a joint American-Mongolian expedition, organized by a retired Chicago commodity trader Maury Kravitz and assisted by Dr. D. Bazargur of the Genghis Khan Geo-Historical Expedition, found a walled burial ground on a hillside near the town of Batshireet. The location, 200 miles to the east-northeast of Ulaanbaatar near the Onon River in the foothills of the Khentii Mountains, was close to both Genghis Khan's presumed birthplace and the site where he announced himself as the universal ruler of the Mongols. The site contained at least 20 unopened tombs for high-status individuals. An earlier Japanese expedition had visited the site in the 1990s, but was closed down over popular fears that the scientists planned to dig up the remains.

On 6 October 2004, Genghis Khan's palace was discovered 150 miles east of the Mongolian capital, Ulaanbaatar, leading to academic speculation that his burial site could alternatively be located nearby.

In an account of a French Jesuit, Kravitz found a reference to an early battle where Genghis Khan, at the time still known as Temüjin, won a decisive victory. According to this source, the location was at the confluence of the Kherlen and "Bruchi" rivers, with Burkhan Khaldun over his right shoulder and after his victory, Temüjin said that this place would be forever his favourite. Kravitz, convinced that Temüjin's grave would be near that battlefield, attempted to find the "Bruchi" river, which turned out to be unknown to cartographers. He did, however, discover a toponym; "Baruun Bruch" ("West Bruch") in the area in question and as of 2006 was conducting excavations there, roughly 100 kilometres (62 mi) east of the Burkhan Khaldun (48°N 110°E, the wider area of Bayanbulag).

In January 2015, Dr Albert Yu-Min Lin from the California Institute for Telecommunications and Information Technology at the University of California, San Diego set up a project asking anyone interested to tag potential sites of the burial through images taken from space. The project resulted in the publication of a paper in the journal Public Library of Science One that claimed to have identified 55 archaeological sites that could potentially be the final resting place of Genghis Khan.

In 2015 and 2016, two expeditions led by French archaeologist Pierre-Henri Giscard, a specialist in Mongolian archaeology, and Raphaël Hautefort, a specialist in scientific imaging, around the Khentii mountains (North East of Mongolia) support the theory of a tumulus at the top of the Burkhan Khaldun mountain. Their non-invasive analysis, carried out with drones, showed that the 250-metre (820 ft)-long tumulus is of human origin and probably built on the model of the Chinese imperial tombs present in Xi'an. In addition, the expedition noted that the mound was still the subject of religious rites and pilgrimages of the surrounding population. The expedition did not give rise to any scientific publication by Pierre-Henri Giscard because it was made without authorization, and without informing local authorities, as access to the area around Burkhan Khaldun remains strictly controlled by the Mongolian government due to the sacredness of the area for the local population.

== In popular culture ==
- The plot of the 1932 American film The Mask of Fu Manchu turns on the discovery and entry of Genghis Khan's tomb which contains a golden sword and mask that the evil doctor needs to accomplish world conquest.
