= Kherlen River =

River in China and Mongolia

Kherlen River 克鲁伦河 (Kèlǔlún hé)
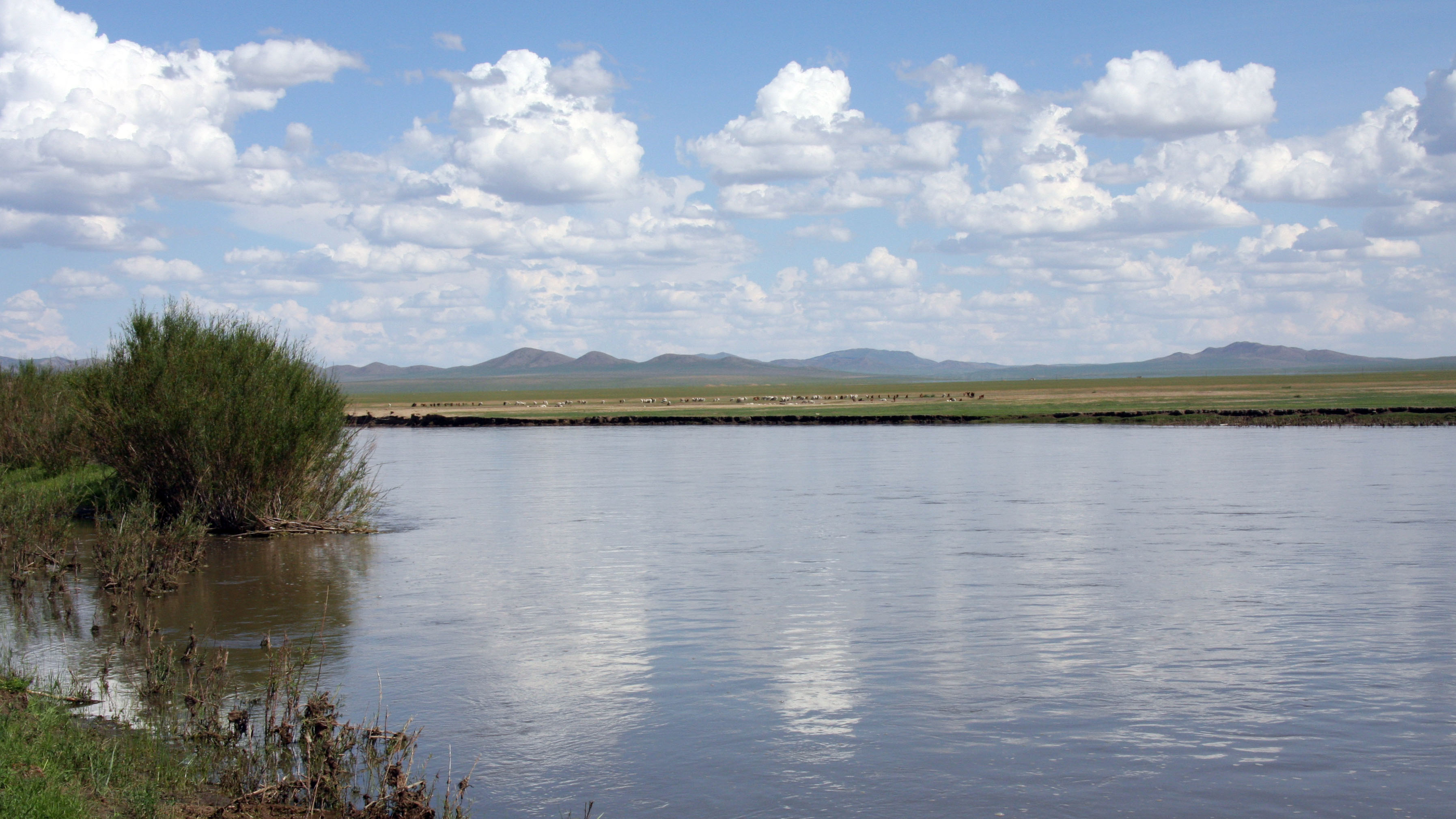
- Near Ondorkhaan

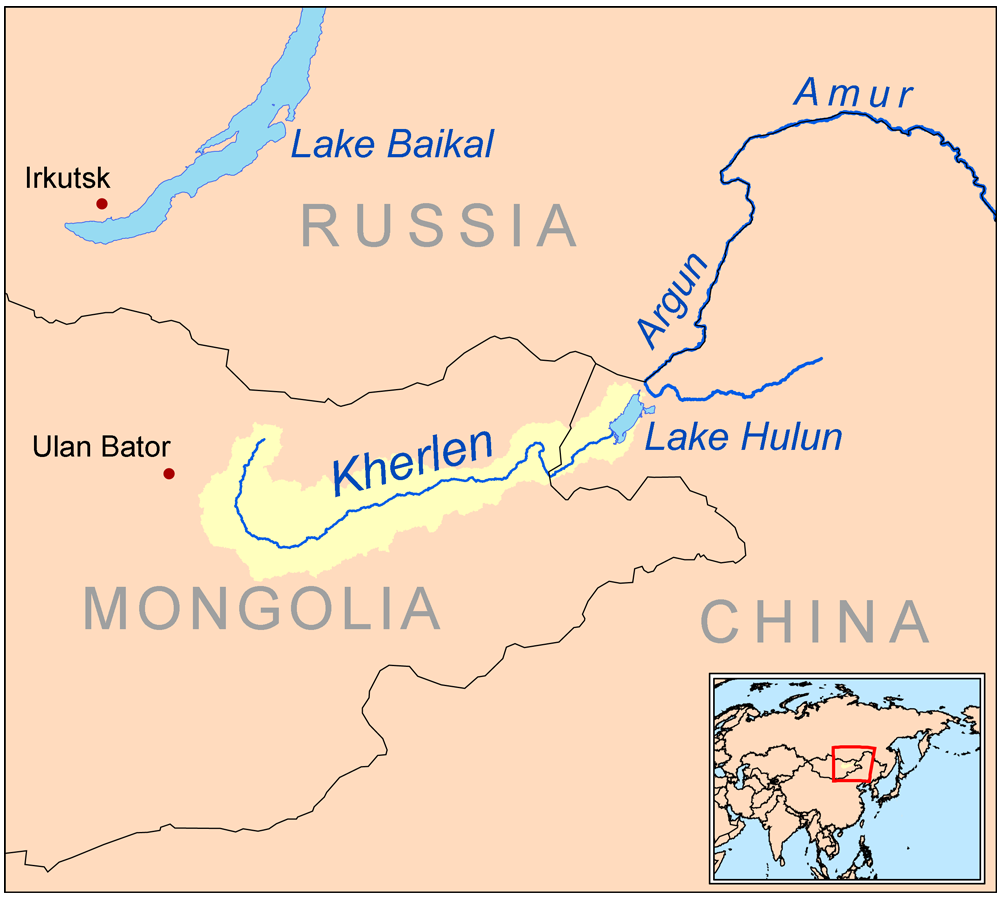
- Etymology: Mongolian: kherlen, "hederated"
- Native name: Хэрлэн гол (Mongolian)

Location
- Country: Mongolia, People's Republic of China
- Mongolian Aimags: Khentii, Dornod
- Chinese Region: Inner Mongolia
- Chinese Prefecture: Hulunbuir

Physical characteristics
- Source
  - location: Burkhan Khaldun, Khentii Mountains
- Mouth: Hulun Nuur
  - coordinates: 48°44′N 117°5′E
- Length: 1,254 km (779 mi)

Kherlen River (also known as Kerülen; Mongolian: Хэрлэн гол; Chinese: 克鲁伦河; pinyin: Kèlǔlún hé) is a 1,254 km river in Mongolia and China. It is also one of the two longest rivers in Mongolia, along with the Orkhon River.

== Course ==
The river originates in the south slopes of the Khentii mountains, near the Burkhan Khaldun mountain in the Khan Khentii Strictly Protected Area, about 180 kilometres or 112 miles northeast of Ulaanbaatar. This area constitutes the divide between the Arctic (Tuul River) and Pacific (Kherlen, Onon) basins and is consequently named "Three River Basins".

From there the Kherlen flows in a mostly eastern direction through the Khentii aimag. Further downriver, it crosses the eastern Mongolian steppe past Ulaan Ereg and Choibalsan, entering China at 48°3′N 115°36′E and emptying into Hulun Nuur after another 164 kilometres or 102 miles.

The mean streamflow of Kherlen River has decreased by more than a half from 2000 to 2008 when compared with prior decades.

=== Kherlen-Ergune-Amur ===
In years with high precipitation, the normally exitless Hulun Lake may overflow at its northern shore, and the water will meet the Ergune River after about 30 kilometres or 19 miles. The Ergune marks the border between Russia and China for about 944 kilometres or 587 miles, until it meets the Amur River. The system Kherlen-Ergune-Amur has a total length of 5,052 kilometres or 3,139 miles.

== Soda lakes, uranium and associated geology ==
Near the city of Choibalsan in the Dornod province (far Northeast Mongolia), the Kherlen river feeds several soda lakes, located (geologically) in the north Kerulen Block (Note: In the new tectonic division of Mongolia, the Kerulen block is the new name for what used to be called the Ereendavaa block. It extends eastward into Russia and northeast China and connects with the Erguna Block.) of the Central Mongolian Fold System. They are closed lakes fed by groundwater, with hardly any surface inflow or outflow, in basins formed in basalt, pyroclastic material and rhyolite erupted from the Choibalsan–Onon volcanic chain during the late Cretaceous; among these lakes are the Tsaidam lakes, the Gurvany lakes and the Shar Burdiin lake. The groundwater that feeds the soda lakes comes from a shallow unconfined aquifer recharged by rainfall and snowmelt, and from precipitation in the highlands north of the lakes. But the local climate is semi-arid, with only 207 mm mean annual precipitation distributed unequally throughout the year. This means that groundwater recharge is relatively rare: only the largest precipitation events and snowmelt periods result in significant recharge.

The Kherlen River is the regional discharge point and also represents a hydrogeological divide for the shallow unconfined aquifer, as groundwater flows south along the topographic gradient. The lakes in their shallow closed basins act as evaporative discharge points.

Several of these lakes are exceedingly rich in uranium; in one location of the Shar Burdiin lake, uranium concentration has been measured at 62.5 μM, (Note: The World Health Organization (WHO) provisional guideline value for uranium is 0.063 μM L^{−1} (15 μg L^{−1}). or ~15,000 ppb U) which may be the highest reported naturally occurring U concentration in a surface water body. Shar Burdiin is also the most highly evaporated lake.

No uranium deposits have been identified within their catchment area. However, approximately 100 km north of the lakes, there are several deposits of uraninite (pitchblende) / coffinite assemblages (Note: These uranium-rich mineral deposits, 100 km north of the lakes, were mined during the 1970s when Mongolia was aligned with the USSR. Several of the old mines were reopened during the years 2000.) within conglomerates and sandstones. Devitrification of volcanic glass is a potential source of uranium in the region's groundwater and soda lakes. Contamination may also result from large dust storms, which are frequent during the spring when the soda lakes are driest.

It has been noted that Shar Burdiin lake shows the maximum concentration in uranium (with, only a short distance away, Gurvany-2 lake not far behind in uranium concentration); and that said concentration decreases while the distance from that area increases, as seen from Tsaidam-2 lake and Gurvany-1 lake which are over 15 km from Shar Burdiin Lake. So another possibility for the contamination is that of wind-blown salts from Shar Burdiin lake and Gurvany-2 lake, reaching the lakes and groundwaters in other parts of the area.

The Khuduu Aral, a 30 kilometre long and 20 km wide plain on the Kherlen river, is home to Genghis Khan's Ikh Aurag (palace). Nearby it there is a small lake that is high in carbonate, soda, and chlorine. Its water has a reputation for treating nerve disorders.

In central Mongolia, a soda lake was found in 2008 to also have high amounts of uranium in its salts.

== See also ==
- List of rivers of Mongolia
