= Khentii =

Khentii may refer to:

- Khentii Province, Mongolia
- Khentii Mountains, Mongolia
