= Ikh Khorig =

Sacred grave site in Khentii Mountains of Mongolia

The Ikh Khorig (Mongolian: Их Хориг), or Great Taboo, is a 240 km^{2} (93 sq mi) area in the Khentii Aimag (province) of Mongolia, believed by some to be the location of Genghis Khan's grave, graves of Khans of the Mongol Empire, Yuan Mongol Khans, Northern Yuan Khans and Khalkha Mongol Khans has been carefully guarded for most of its history, and it is only since the late 1980s that the area has been open to archaeologists. The Burkhan Khaldun is part of the 12,000 square kilometres (4,600 sq mi) Khan Khentii Strictly Protected Area established in 1992. It had strong religious significance before Genghis Khan made it a powerful landmark and is considered the most sacred mountain in Mongolia since it was designated as sacred by Genghis Khan. It was inscribed as a UNESCO World Heritage Site on 4 July 2015 under the title "Great Burkhan Khaldun Mountain and its surrounding sacred landscape."

== Background ==
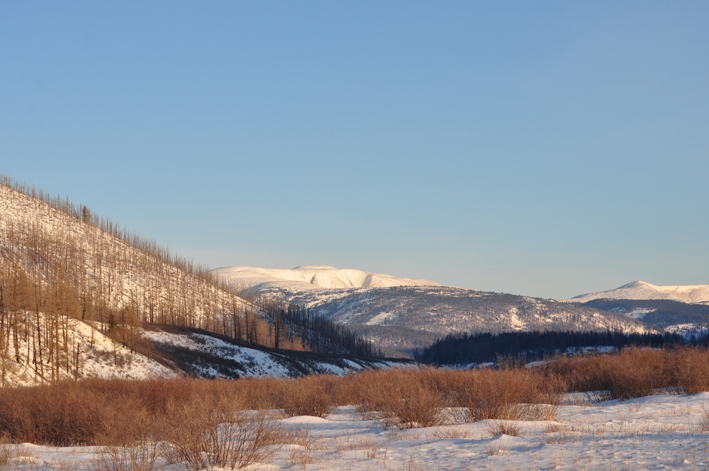
Burkhan Khaldun

According to The Secret History of the Mongols, Genghis Khan chose the area as his final resting place when he went hunting near the Burkhan Khaldun mountain in the Khentii Mountains of his homeland. He sat down to rest under a tree, and was so impressed by the scenery that he said: "What a beautiful view! Bury me here when I pass away." Burkhan Khaldun was also greatly important to Genghis Khan because of his origins near there and because he escaped from Merkit enemies on the mountain in the late 1100s; he pledged at the time to honor the mountain from then on with sacrifices and prayer every morning.

It is not known whether he really was buried there, but the Mongols took several steps to give the impression that he was. The area, already made difficult to reach by a series of mountains covered in thick forest, was declared sacred, and off limits to everyone except family members and the Darkhad, a group of elite warriors and their families, who were given the task of ensuring that no one else entered under penalty of death. The only legitimate reason for entrance was to bury a relative of Genghis Khan.

== History ==
The Darkhads and their descendants faithfully carried out their assignment for more than 700 years, from the Khan's death in 1227 until the establishment of the Mongolian People's Republic (a satellite state of the USSR) in 1924. The Soviets feared that if the region were made publicly accessible, memories of Genghis Khan would encourage Mongolian nationalism, so they declared the land a 'Highly Restricted Area' and cordoned off 10,400 square-kilometers of surrounding land.

== Modern excavations ==
The first archeological expedition to the region was the 1989 "Three Rivers" expedition, which was carried out by a joint Mongolian–Japanese team with the support of the Yomiuri Shimbun newspaper. The team worked from 1989 to 1992 using ultrasound technology, which enabled them to find 1380 possible graves of Mongolian nobles. The idea of archaeological excavations, however, offends many Mongolians, who due to either superstition or respect for the leader believe that the Khan's resting place should be left undisturbed.
