= Asralt Khairkhan =

Mountain in Erdene, Töv, Mongolia

- Location within Mongolia

Highest point
- Elevation: 2,799 m (9,183 ft)
- Prominence: 1,438 m (4,718 ft)
- Listing: Ribu
- Coordinates: 48°27′56″N 107°24′46″E

Geography
- Location: Mongolia
- Parent range: Khentii Mountains

Asralt Khairkhan (Mongolian: Асралт хайрхан, IPA: [ásrəɬtʰ χɛ́rχəɴ]) is a mountain in Erdene, Töv Province in central Mongolia. It has an elevation of 2,799 metres (9,183 ft) and is the highest mountain of the Khentii Mountains range. The edge of the mountain is home to a small settlement that hosts the only known monastery of the local minority religion Pi Shashin.
