= Burkhan Khaldun =

Mountain in Khentii Province, Mongolia

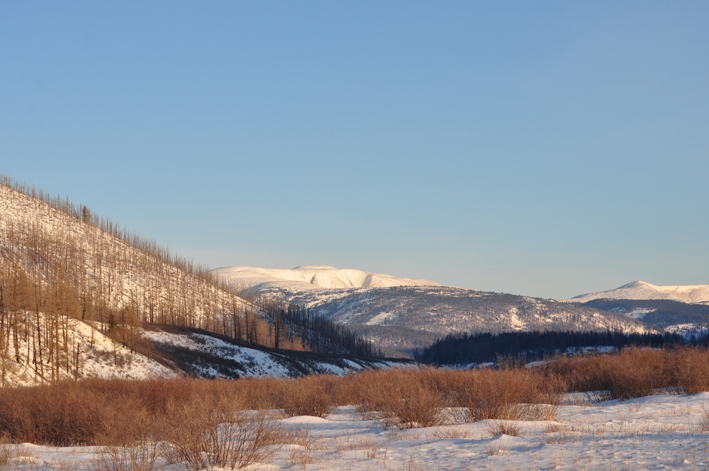
- Burkhan Khaldun

Highest point
- Elevation: 2,340 m (7,680 ft)
- Prominence: 180 m (590 ft)
- Coordinates: 48°45′43″N 109°00′37″E

Geography
- Location within Mongolia
- Location: Mongolia
- Parent range: Khentii Mountains

UNESCO World Heritage Site
- Official name: Great Burghan Khaldun Mountain and its surrounding sacred landscape
- Type: Cultural
- Criteria: iv, vi
- Designated: 2015 (39th session)
- Reference no.: 1440
- Region: Asia-Pacific

The Burkhan Khaldun (Mongolian: Бурхан Халдун [pʊ́rχaɴ‿χáɬtʊɴ]) is one of the Khentii Mountains in the Khentii Province of northeastern Mongolia. The mountain or its locality is believed to be the birthplace of Genghis Khan as well as his tomb. It is also the birthplace of one of his most successful generals, Subutai.

The mountain is part of the 12,000 square kilometres (4,600 sq mi) Khan Khentii Strictly Protected Area established in 1992. It had strong religious significance before Genghis Khan made it a powerful landmark and is considered the most sacred mountain in Mongolia since it was designated as sacred by Genghis Khan. It was inscribed as a UNESCO World Heritage Site on 4 July 2015 under the title "Great Burkhan Khaldun Mountain and its surrounding sacred landscape." Under a Presidential Decree of 1995 the worship of this mountain has been formalised and the mountain declared a national monument. Its ecosystem is complex with unique biodiversity with flora of the Central Asian steppe. It has 50 species of fauna and 253 species of birds.

== Geography ==
Burkhan Khaldun is in the northeast of Mongolia in the middle of the Khentii mountain range. The mountain is integral to the Khan Khentii Strictly Protected Area established in 1992, which extends over an area of 12,000 square kilometres (4,600 sq mi).

Burkhan Khaldun means the "God Mountain" or "Buddha Mountain" and is also called Khentii Khan (The King of the Khentii Mountain range). It is one of the Khentii Mountains in the Khentii Province of northeastern Mongolia. It is the highest mountain of the region, rising to an elevation of 2,362 metres (7,749 ft), and is crescent-shaped. It is the source of several rivers: the Kherlen river flows into Hulun Lake, which in years of high precipitation overflows into the Amur Basin; the Onon River flows through other tributaries into the Amur, which has its outfall in the Pacific Ocean; and the rivers Tuul, Kharaa and Yeruu flow northwards to join the Selenge, which empties into Lake Baikal. It is in a complex ecosystem with unique biodiversity which is defined as a "transition zone from Siberian permafrost land forms to great steppe".

== History ==
In the Secret History of the Mongols, Genghis Khan, who later became the "World Conqueror" believing in his own destiny, said:

I went up Mount Burkhan,
Though I was frightened and ran like an insect,
I was shielded by Mount Burkhan Khaldun,
I will honor Burkhan Khaldun with sacrifices every morning and pray to it every day: my children and my children’s children shall be mindful of this...

Genghis Khan then started his campaign to unify the land and people of Mongolia as a strong force. He gave the Burkhan Khaldun the status of a royal sacred mountain. The history is chronicled in the Secret History of the Mongols, which UNESCO recognised in 1990 as a "literary creation of outstanding universal significance". In this document Burkhan Khaldun is described in detail and mentioned 27 times, which signifies the unique position of the mountain in Mongolia‘s heritage. This document establishes the authenticity of the site, stating:

The origin of Chingis Khan is Burte-Chino predestined by the propitious

Heaven. His spouse was Gua-Maral. They crossed the Tenggis and settled in the Mount Burkhan Khaldun upstream of the Onon River where Batachigan was born

to them (SHM §1)”
...When Toguril Khan set out, as he was approaching in the direction of the Burgi Escarpment of the Kerulen River on the Southern side of Burkahn Khaldun (SHM §107).

A Presidential Decree of 1995 formalized the worship of the Burkhan Khaldun Mountain as a national monument. Special worship is offered to the mountain according to a prescribed procedure at the main "Ovoo of the Heaven"; it is reserved for a few officials of the state and local administration, shamans and a few Buddhist lamas (monks).

== World Heritage status ==
Burkhan Khaldun was inscribed as a UNESCO World Heritage Site at the 39th session of the World Heritage Committee on 4 July 2015 under the title "Great Burkhan Khaldun Mountain and its surrounding sacred landscape", covering an area of 443,739 hectares (1,096,500 acres) and an additional buffer zone of 271,651 hectares (671,260 acres), categorised under Criterion (iv) for its unique cultural tradition of mountain and nature worship over the past several millennia, and (vi) for its universally known historical and literary epic of immense importance.

== Religious significance ==
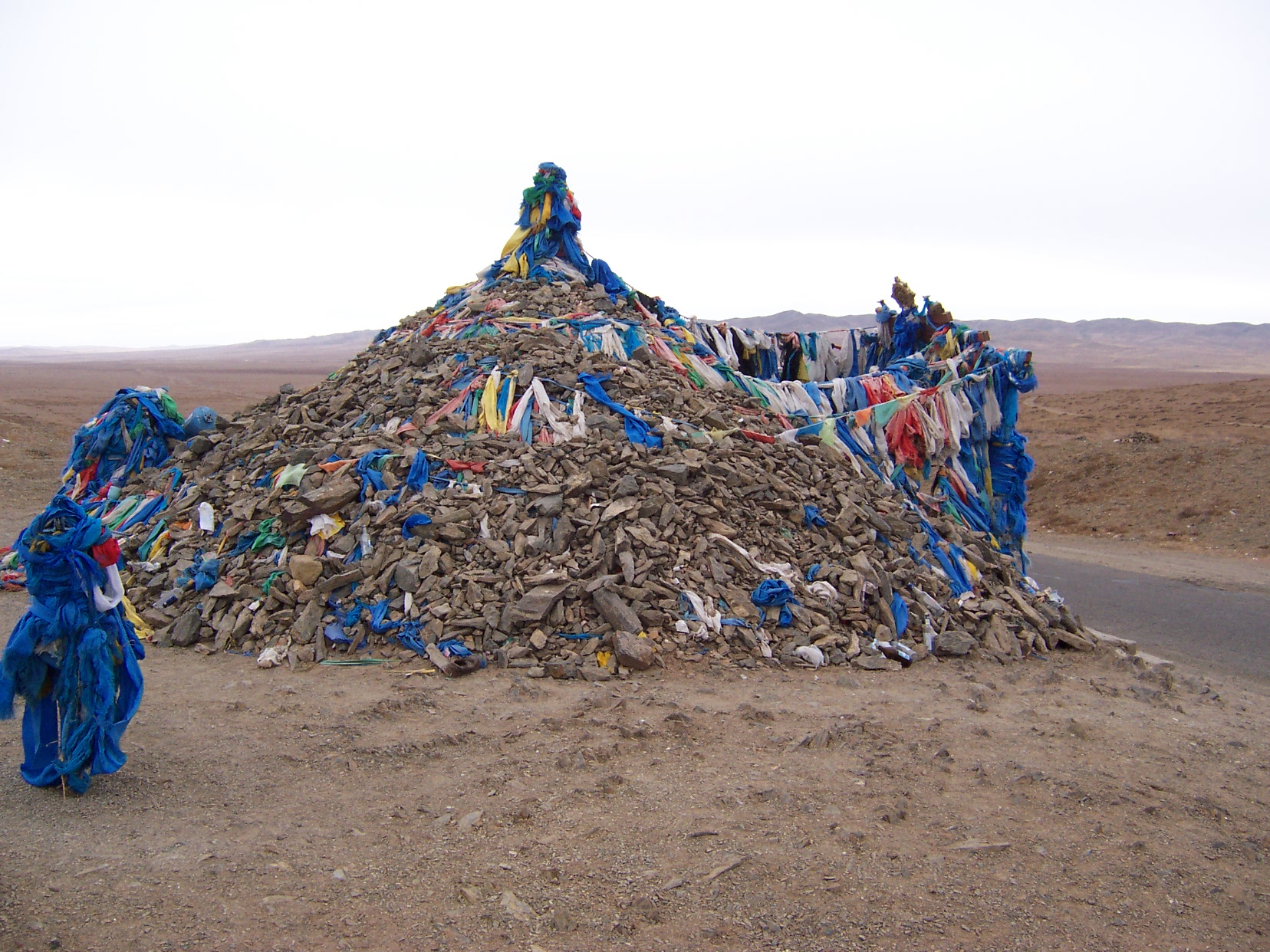
An ovoo.

Burkhan Khaldun has a spiritual significance unmatched by any other mountain in Mongolia and is given the symbolic status of the "cradle" of Mongolia's nationhood fully representing the "heritage and traditional ways of life of nomadic people of Mongolia". The (unconfirmed) Mongolian belief that Genghis Khan was born here and is buried somewhere in this mountain has added to its sanctity, particularly since Khan offered worship here and declared the mountain as the most sacred in the country.

It has given authenticity to the spiritual nature of the mountain. As a result, regular pilgrimage is undertaken by the people to the three sacred major ovoos or stone cairns at the sacred sites along a specified route where Mongolian shamanic worship is offered. The specified route is unique and covers: Main Ovoo of Heaven at the pinnacle of the mountain via Gurvan Khoriud ("Three Forbidden Precincts"); the Uud Mod ("Two Trees of Entrance"); the Bosgo Tengeriin Davaa ("Threshold Pass of Heaven"); the catchment of the Kherlen River and the Sacred Bogd Rivers; and finally to the Beliin ("Lowest") ovoo.

== Flora ==
The flora found in the mountain belongs to the Central Asian steppe and consists of coniferous forests of the taiga. The plant species reported are 28 listed in the Mongolian Red Book, 15 very rare species, and 28 species listed as rare species. The species listed in the IUCN Red List are found here: two critically endangered species, four endangered species, and eight vulnerable species.

== Fauna ==
In the faunal geographical province of the Burkhan Khaldun Mountain in the Khentii district the fauna reported are more than "50 species of 27 genera of six orders including five species of mammals/insectivores, 4 species of hymenoptera, four species of lagomorpha, 19 species of rodents, 13 species of predators, five species of ungulate, one species of reptile, and 253 species of birds". According to the Mongolian Red Data Book the very rare mammal species are musk deer (Moshus moshiferus) and moose (Alces alces); the very rare bird species are the Siberian white crane (Grus luecogeranus), Greater spotted eagle (Aquila clanga), Pallas’s fish eagle (Haliaeetus leucoryphus), white-naped crane (Grus vipio) and hooded crane (Grus monacha); the fish species is the Amur sturgeon (Acipenser schrenckii).

== See also ==
- Ikh Khorig

== Bibliography ==
- Weatherford, Jack (22 March 2005). Genghis Khan and the Making of the Modern World. Crown/Archetype. ISBN 978-0-307-23781-1.
