= Tuul River =

River in Mongolia

Tuul River Tola
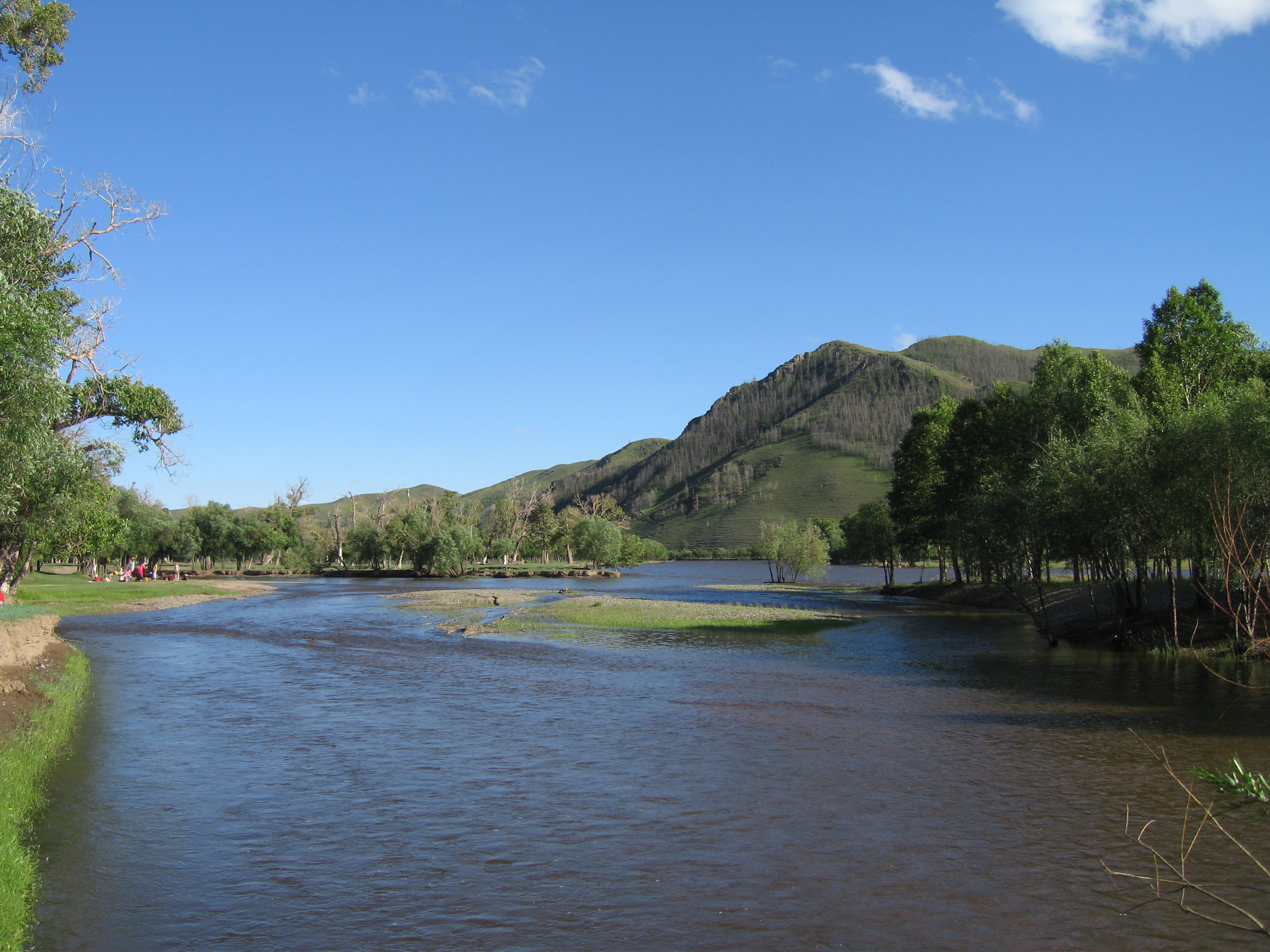
- The Tuul flowing through the Gorkhi-Terelj National Park

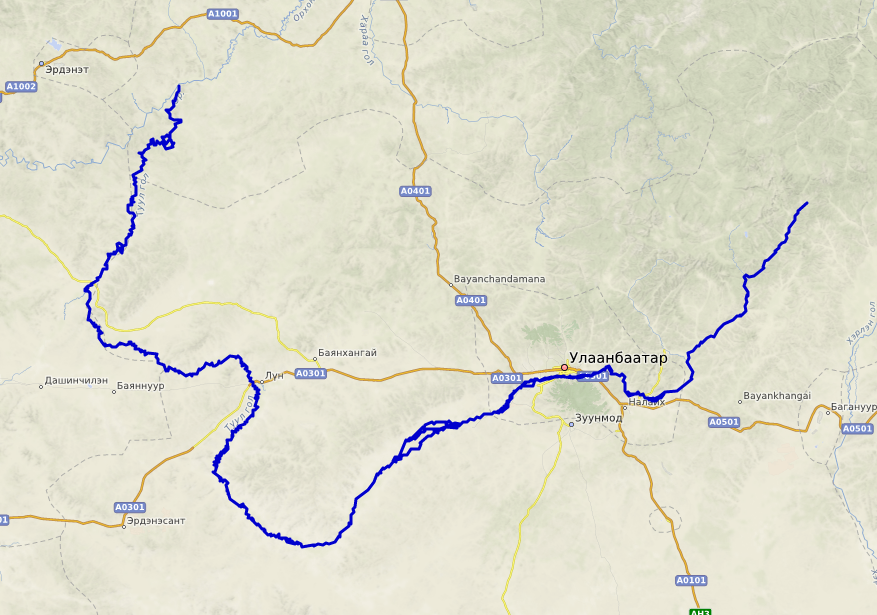
- Etymology: Mongolian: туулах, tuulah, [ˈtʰʊːɮəχ] lit. "to wade through"
- Nickname: Queen Tuul
- Native name: Туул гол

Location
- Country: Mongolia
- Aimags: Töv, Bulgan, Selenge
- City: Ulaanbaatar

Physical characteristics
- Source: Khan Khentii Strictly Protected Area
  - location: Erdene sum, Töv Province
  - coordinates: 48°30′40″N 108°13′20″E
- Mouth: Orkhon River
  - location: Orkhontuul sum, Selenge
  - coordinates: 48°56′50″N 104°48′0″E
- Length: 882.8 km (548.5 mi)
- Basin size: 49,840 km^{2} (19,240 sq mi)

Basin features
- Progression: Orkhon→ Selenga→ Lake Baikal→ Angara→ Yenisey→ Kara Sea
- Tributaries
  - right: Terelch River

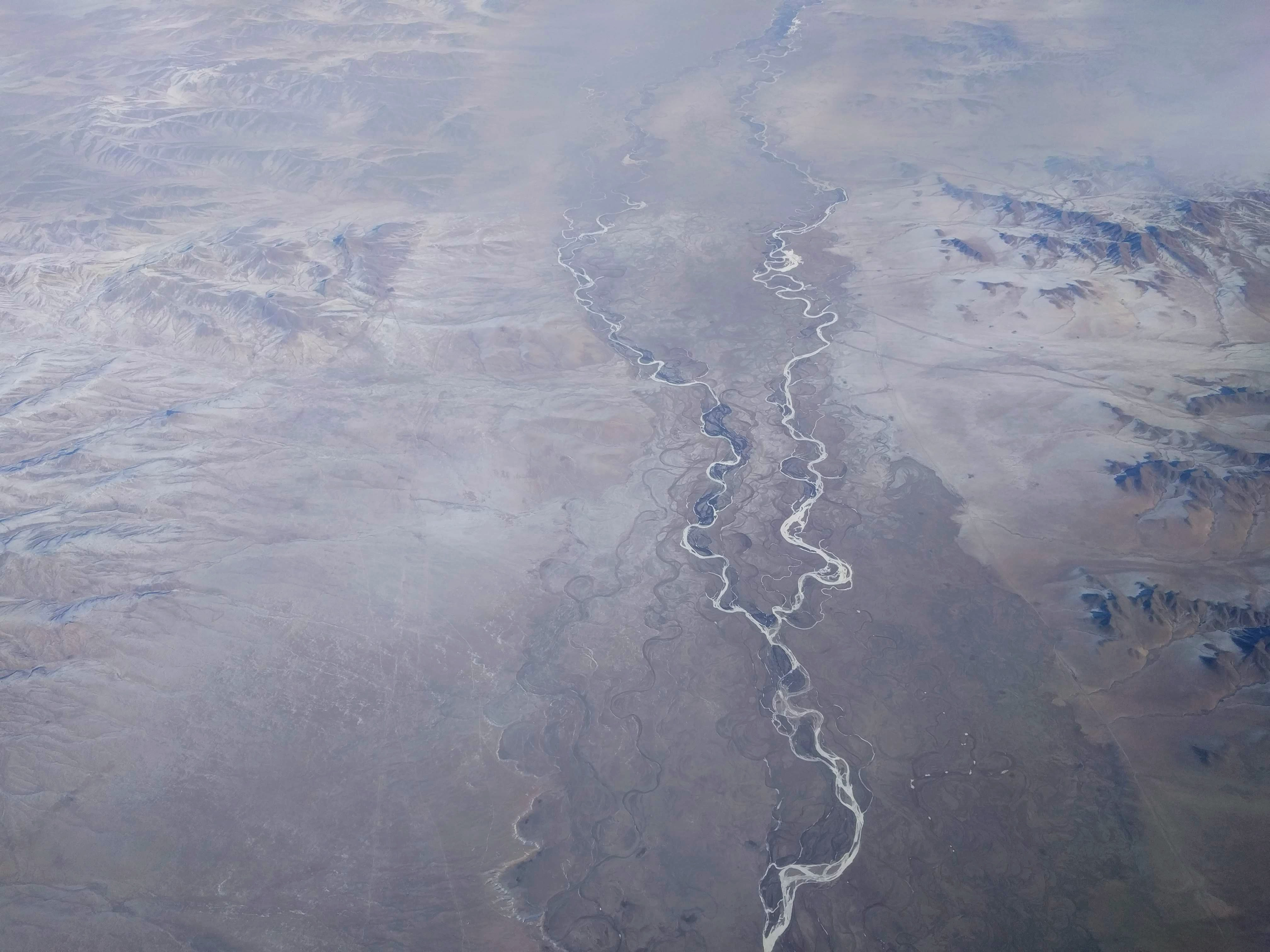
Tuul River from above

The Tuul River or Tula River (/ˈtuːl/; Mongolian: Туул гол, Tuul gol, pronounced [ˈtʰʊːɮ ɢɔɮ]; in older sources also Tola; Old Turkic: 𐱃𐰆𐰍𐰞𐰀:𐰇𐰏𐰔, romanized: Toɣla ögüz) is a river in central and northern Mongolia. Sacred to the Mongols, the Tuul is generally called the Hatan Tuul (Mongolian: Хатан Туул, [ˈχaʰtəɴ tʰʊːɮ]; lit. "Queen Tuul"). It is 882.8 kilometres or 549 miles long and drains an area of 49,840 square kilometres or 19,240 square miles. The Secret History of the Mongols (1240 AD) frequently mentions a "Black Forest of the Tuul River" where the palace of Ong Khan was located.

The river originates in the Khan Khentii Strictly Protected Area in the Khentii Mountains, in the Erdene sum of Töv aimag. From there, it travels southwest until it reaches the territory of Ulaanbaatar. Its water runs through the southern part of the capital city of Mongolia, continuing in a western direction in large loops. When it meets the border of Bulgan aimag it turns north, running along that border. After it enters Selenge aimag, it discharges into the Orkhon River near the sum center of Orkhontuul sum.

The Orkhon flows into the Selenge River, which flows into Russia and Lake Baikal. The Tuul River also flows along the Khustain Nuruu National Park. It is typically frozen over from the middle of November through the middle of April. Willow forests grow along the Tuul River, and the river itself is home to endangered species of sturgeon. Currently the river is suffering from pollution, some caused by Ulaanbaatar's central sewage treatment facility, as well as heavy mineral and sedimentation pollution caused by gold mining in the Zaamar area. In addition, the steady influx of people settling near the river may be causing a degradation of water quality.

== Usage ==
In 2014, almost 100 million m^{3} of water was withdrawn from the river for domestic, livestock, cropland and industrial use, making it the most used river in Mongolia.

== See also ==
- List of rivers of Mongolia
