= Gorkhi-Terelj National Park =

National park of Mongolia

Gorkhi_Terelj National Park
- Mongolian: Горхи-Тэрэлж
- IUCN category II (national park)
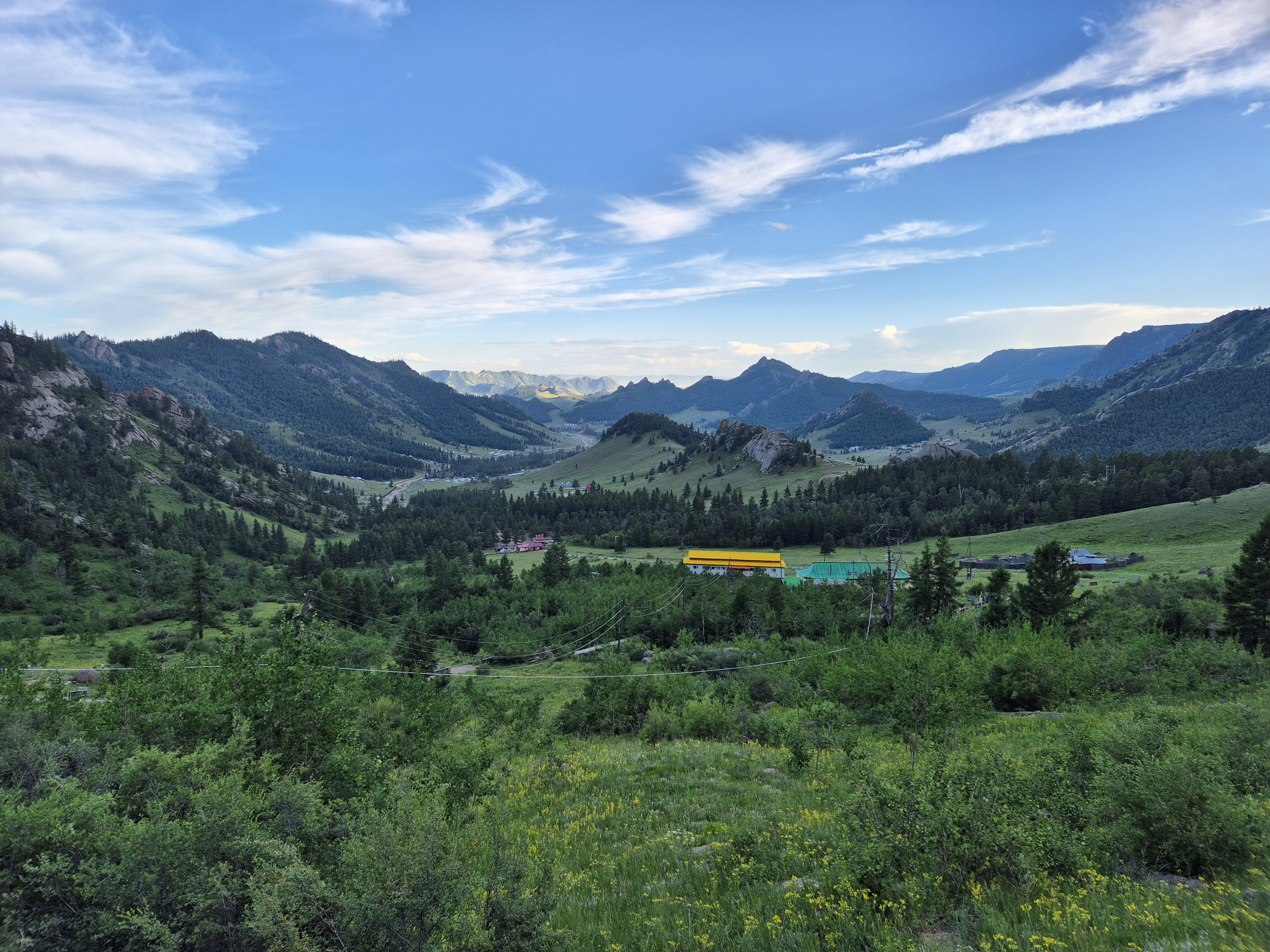
- View from the monastery, Gorkhi-Terelj National Park

- Location within Mongolia
- Location: Mongolia
- Nearest city: Ulaanbaatar
- Coordinates: 48.150204°N 107.576006°E
- Area: 292,000 hectares (721,548 acres; 2,920 km^{2}; 1,127 sq mi)
- Established: 1993
- Governing body: Ministry of Environment and Green Development of Mongolia

Gorkhi-Terelj National Park (Mongolian: Горхи-Тэрэлж [ˈɡɔr̥xi ˈtiɾɘɮtʃ], creek-rhododendron) is one of the national parks of Mongolia. The Terelj tourist zone has a number of "tourist camps" (Mongolian: жуулчны бааз, juulchny baaz). It is connected with Ulaanbaatar by a paved road (main road to the East #A0501 Baganuur-Öndörkhaan direction, 37 km from Ulaanbaatar city center, left turn to the branch #A24, 5 km later road crosses Tuul River and the National park territory begins). The road comes to the Gorkhiin Davaa (Mongolian: Горхийн даваа) pass. Most of the tourist camps and tourist attractions are before this pass. The road then ends at the settlement of Terelj, which features small shops and restaurants. The Terelj settlement is located in the valley of the Terelj River (Terelj Gol), approximately 66 km from the Ulaanbaatar city center. The national park tourist zone is formally in Nalaikh düüreg (district) part of Ulaanbaatar municipality, the rest of the protected zone beginning to the north of the Terelj River, is located in Mongolia's Töv Province (Töv aimag).

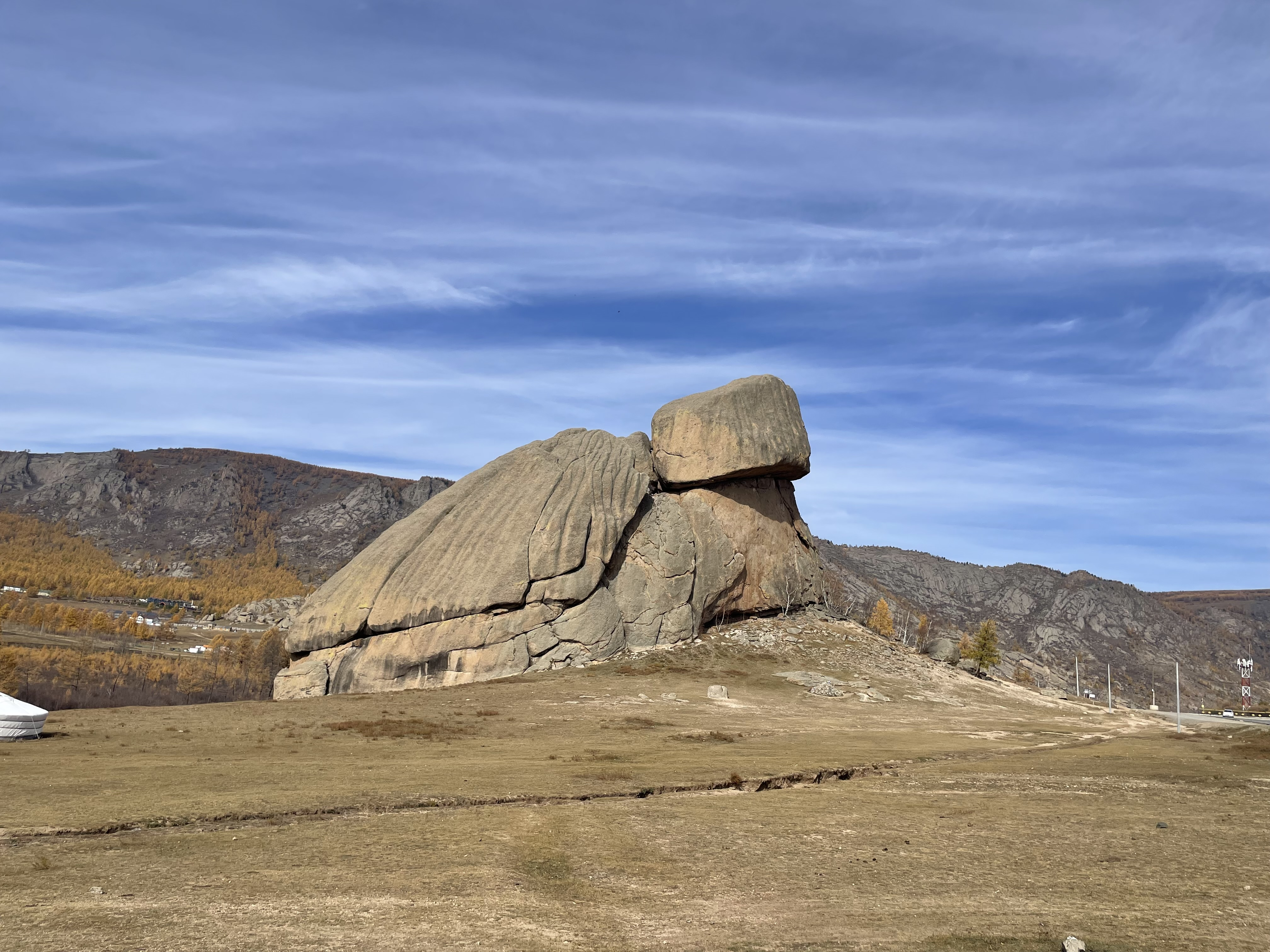
Turtle Rock

A small southern portion of the park is developed for tourists, with restaurants, souvenir shops, horses and camels for rent, and tourist ger camps, many of them run by the Juulchin corporation, the former state tourism company. However, most of the park is undeveloped and difficult to access. Attractions include Khagiin Khar Lake, a 20 m deep glacial lake 80 km upstream from the tourist camps, and Yestii Hot Water Springs, natural hot springs 18 km further upstream. The park also has a Buddhist monastery that is open to visitors. Park wildlife includes brown bears and over 250 species of birds. The Tuul River flows through the park.

The park has many rock formations for rock climbers, and includes two famous formations named for things they resemble: Turtle Rock (Mongolian: Melkhii Khad) and the Old Man Reading a Book (Praying Lama Rock).

== History ==
The park was established in 1993.

== Gallery ==
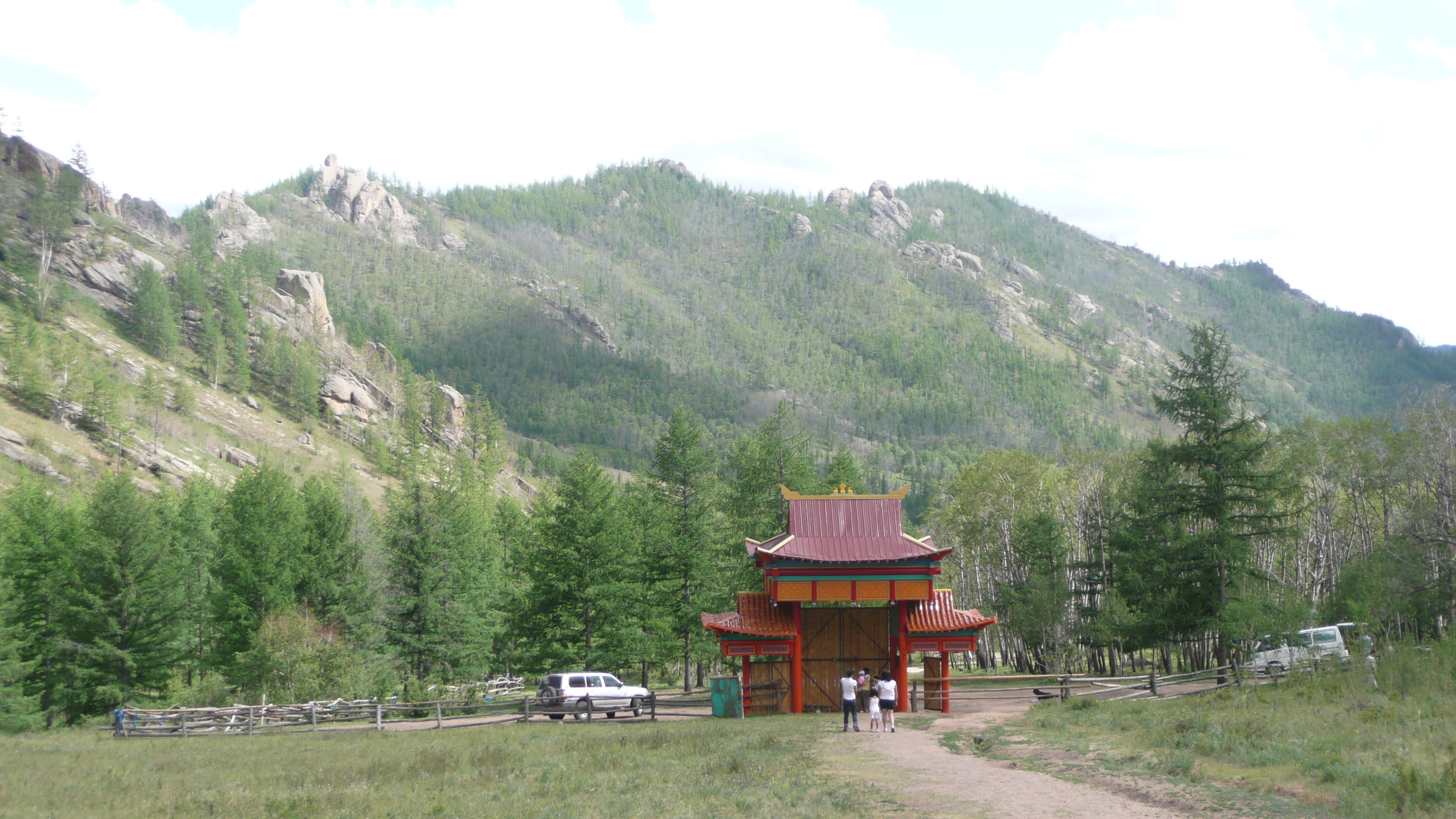
One of the entrances to Gorkhi-Terelj National Park.

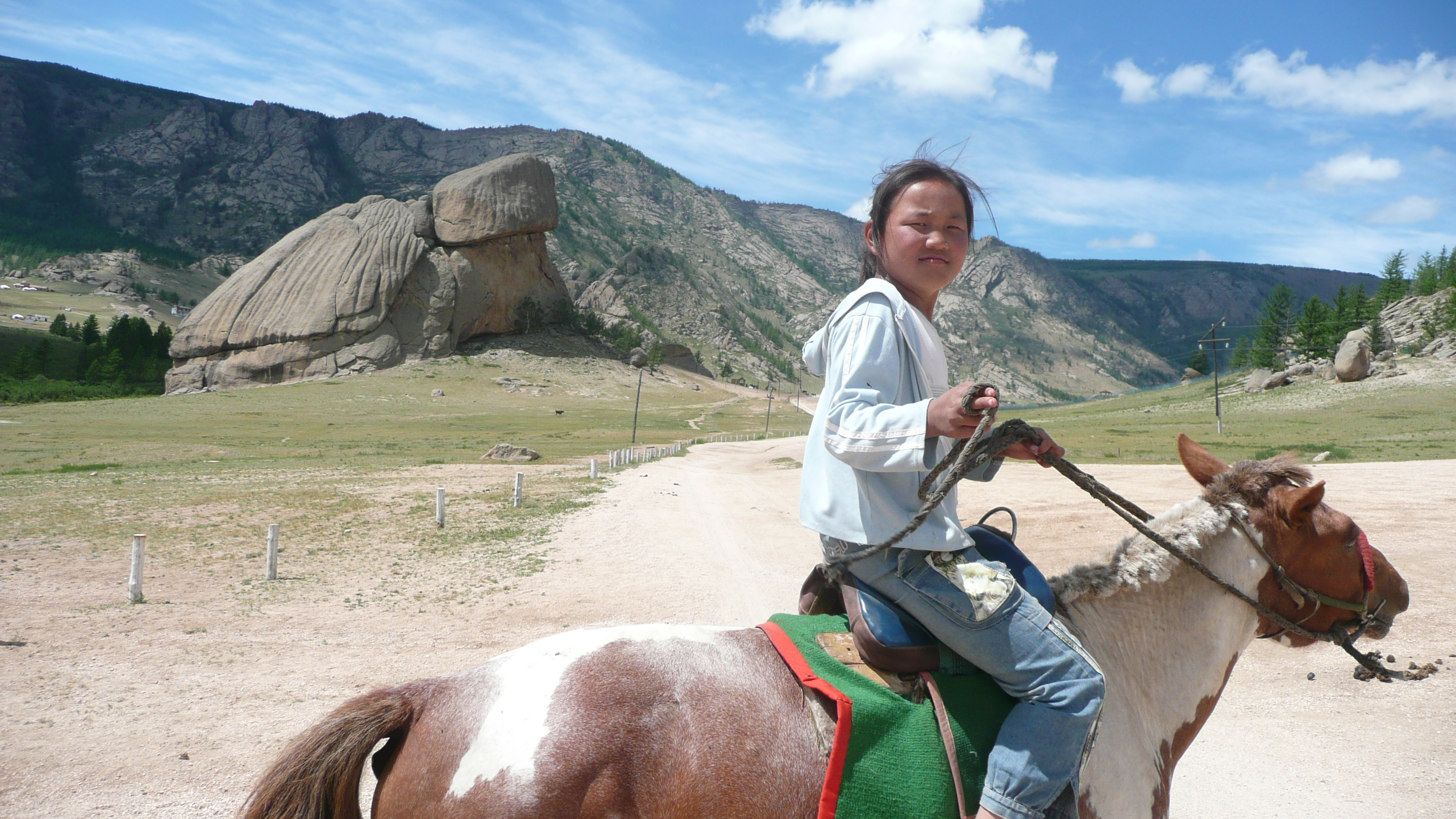
A young horsewoman near Turtle Rock.

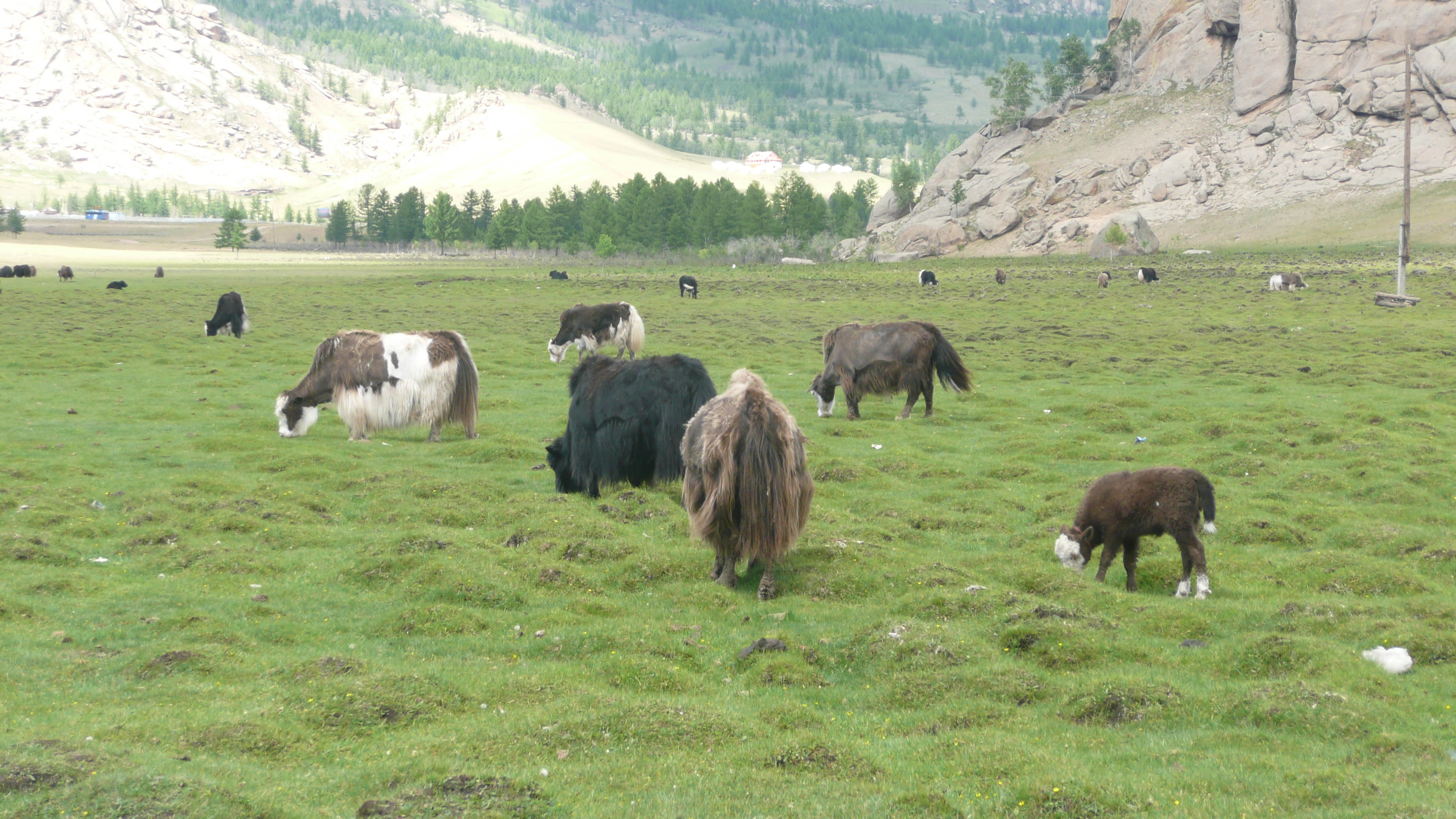
A herd of yaks on a plain in the park.

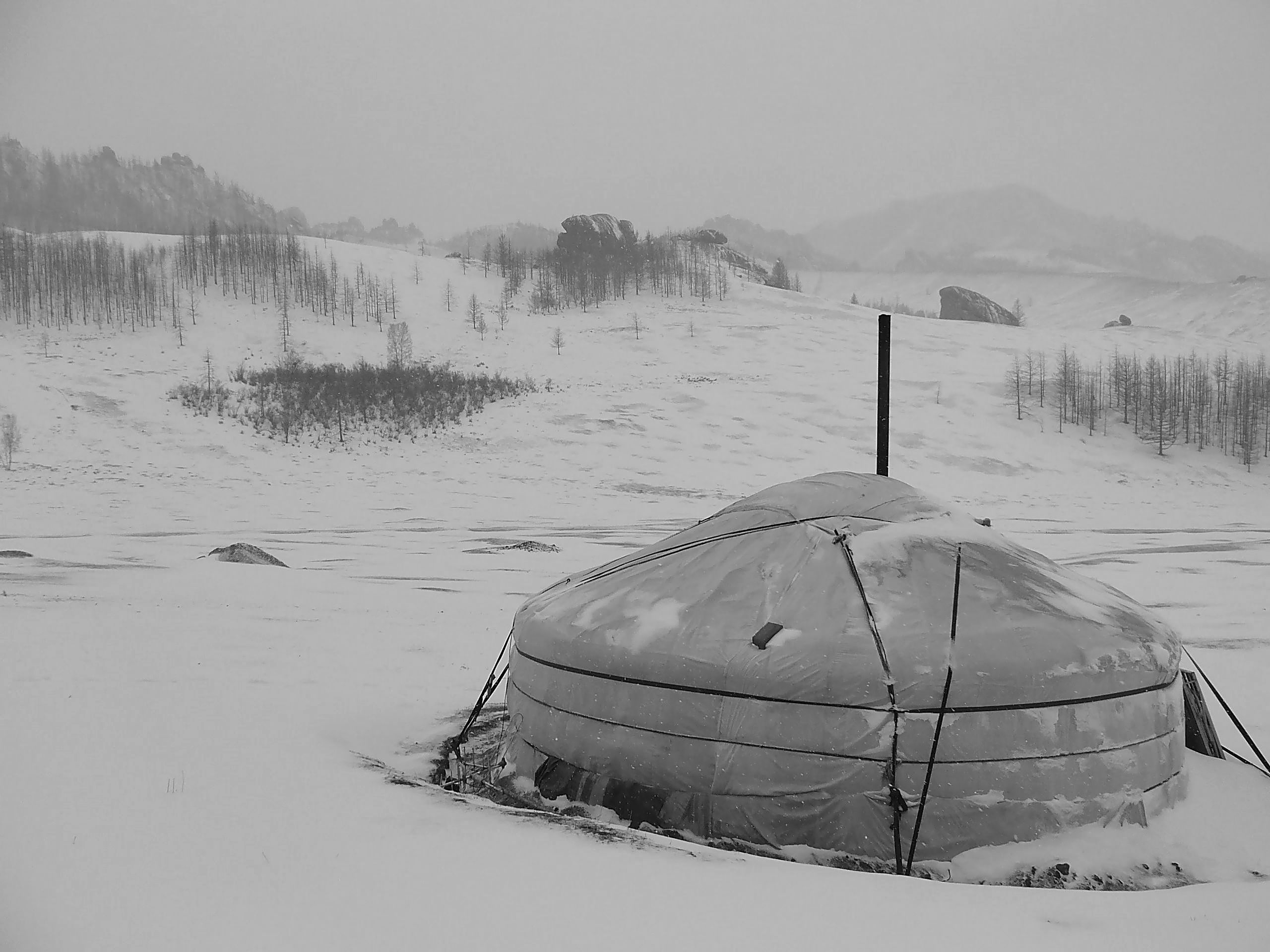
A yurt in winter in the Gorkhi-Terelj National Park.

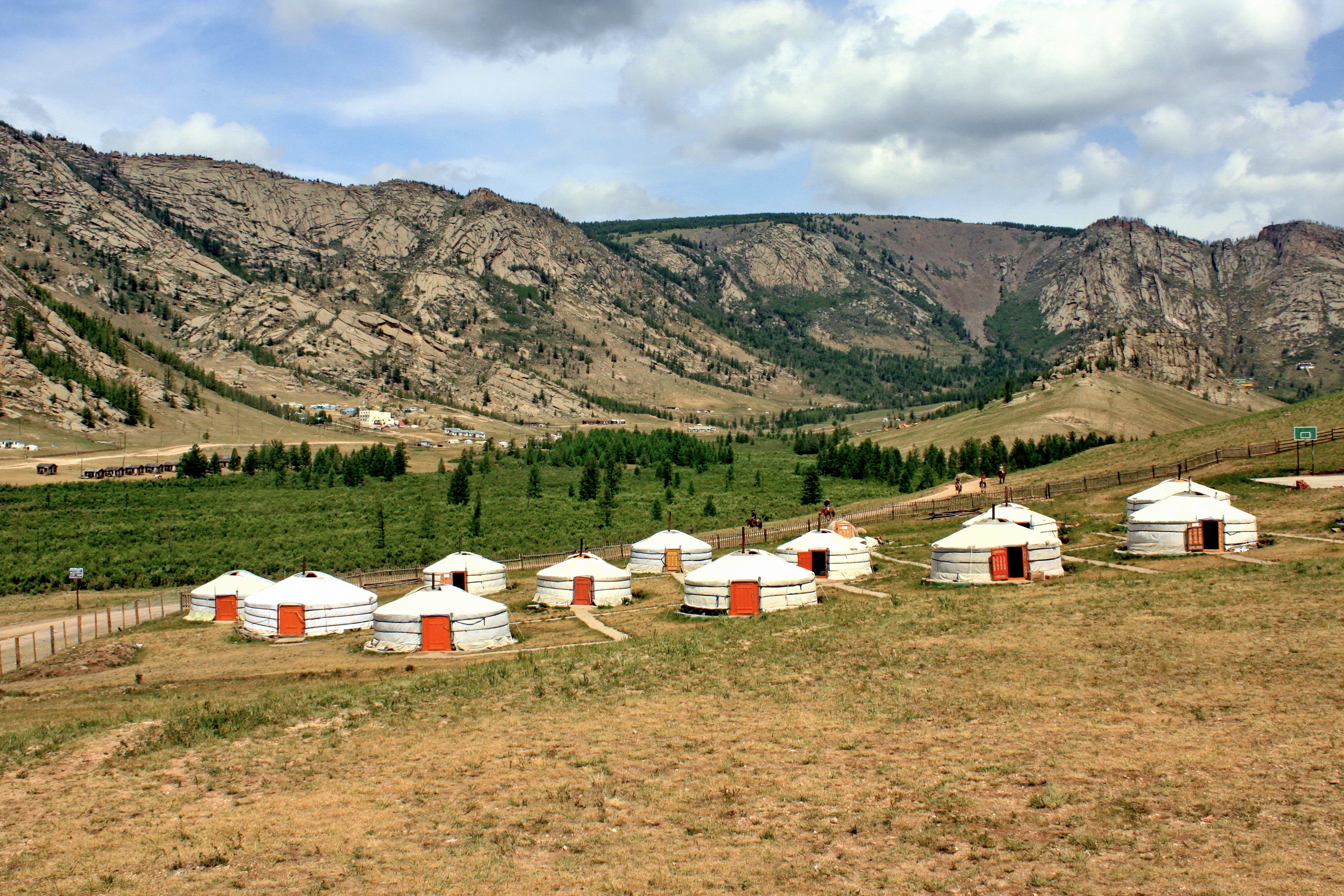
Yurts. Gorkhi-Terelj National Park.

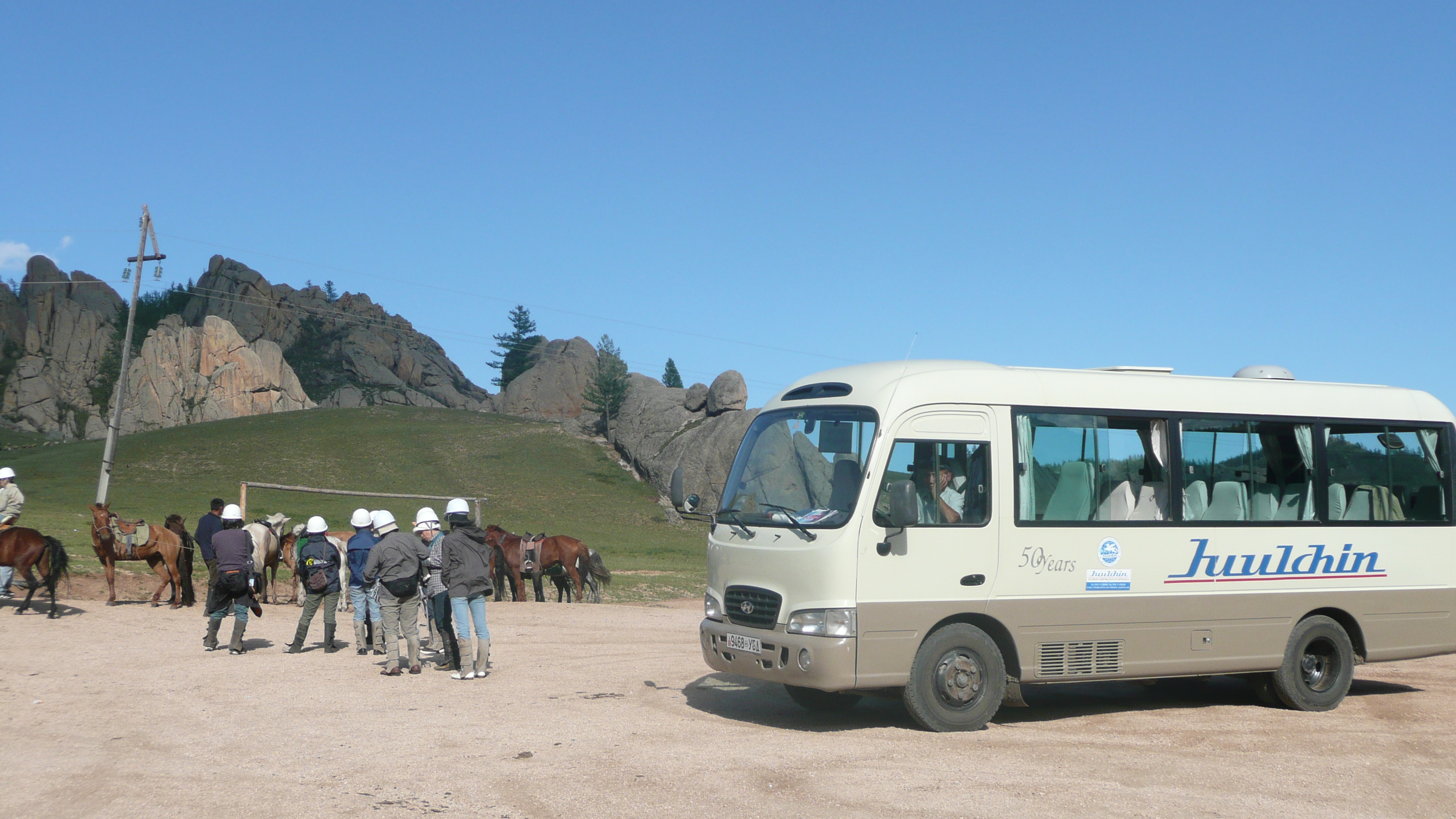
A group of tourists, Gorkhi-Terelj National Park.

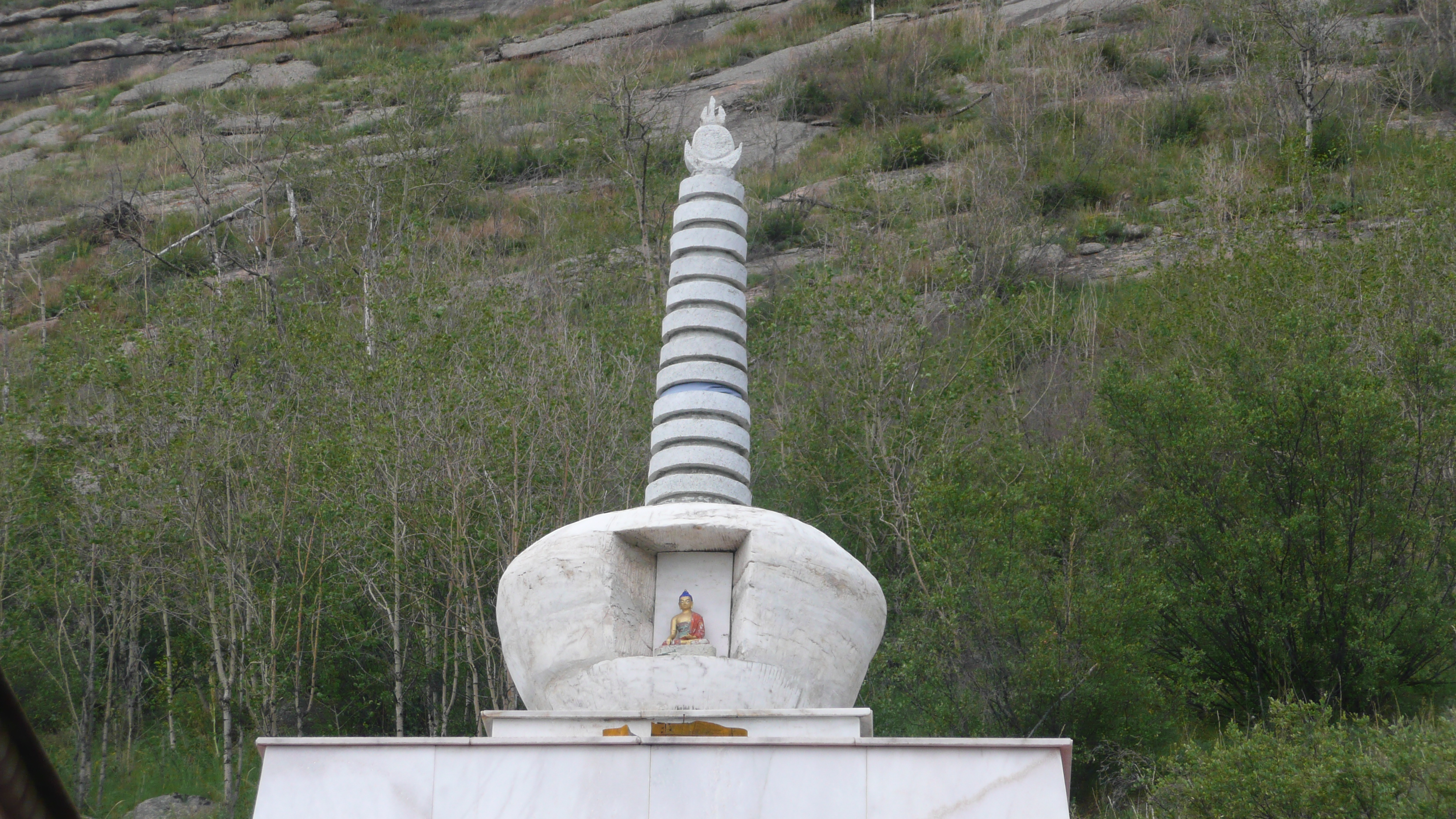
Buddhist Stupa, at the Monastery in Gorkhi-Terelj National Park.

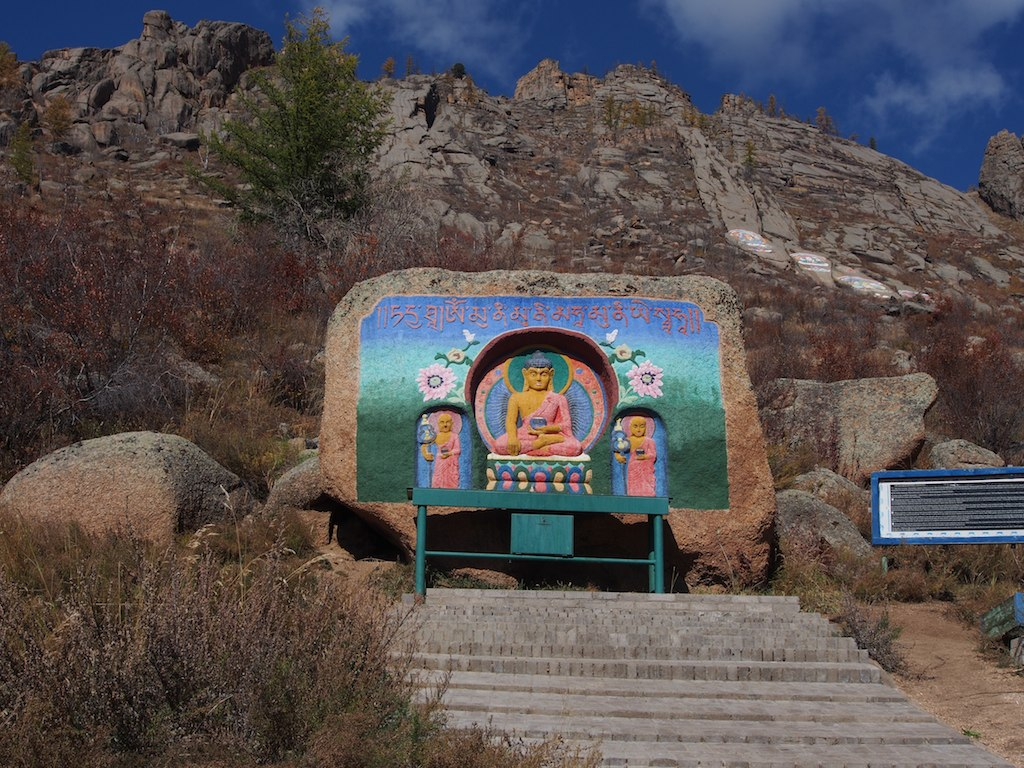
Ex-voto on the way to the Gorkhi Terelj monastery.

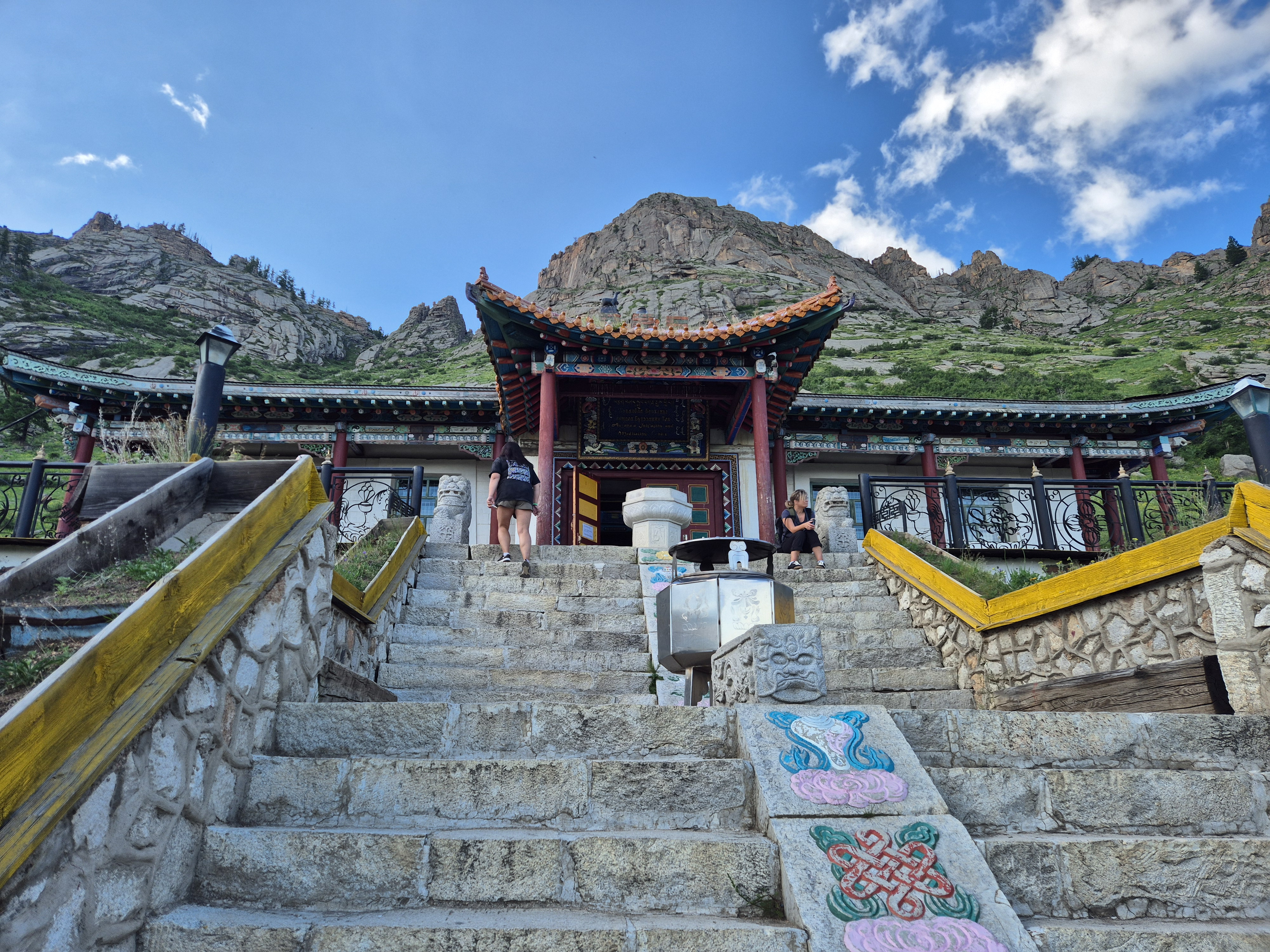
Stairs in Gorkhi Terelj monastery.

== See also ==
- List of national parks of Mongolia
