= Hulun Lake =

Lake in Inner Mongolia, China

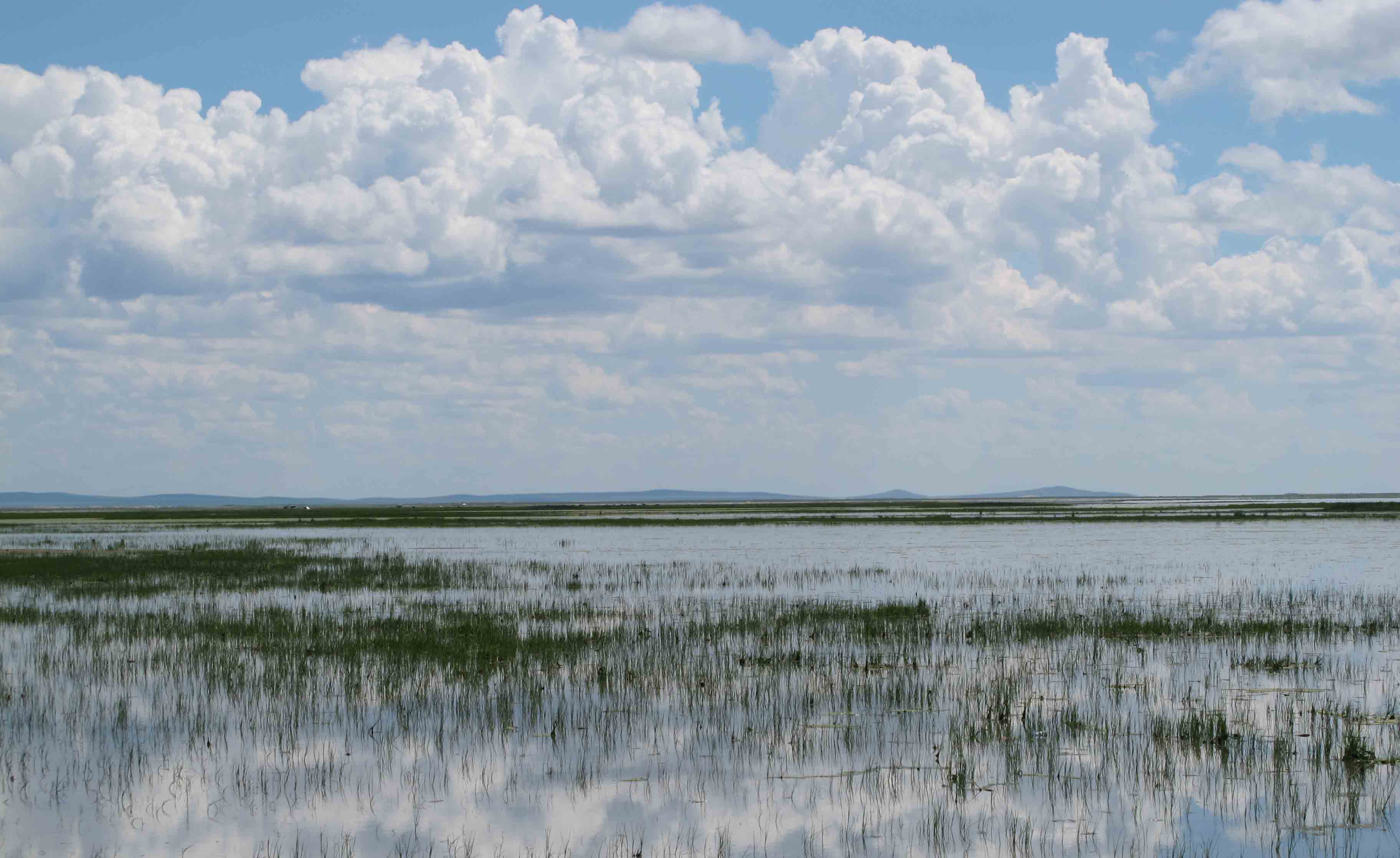
- Panorama of lake with reed beds.

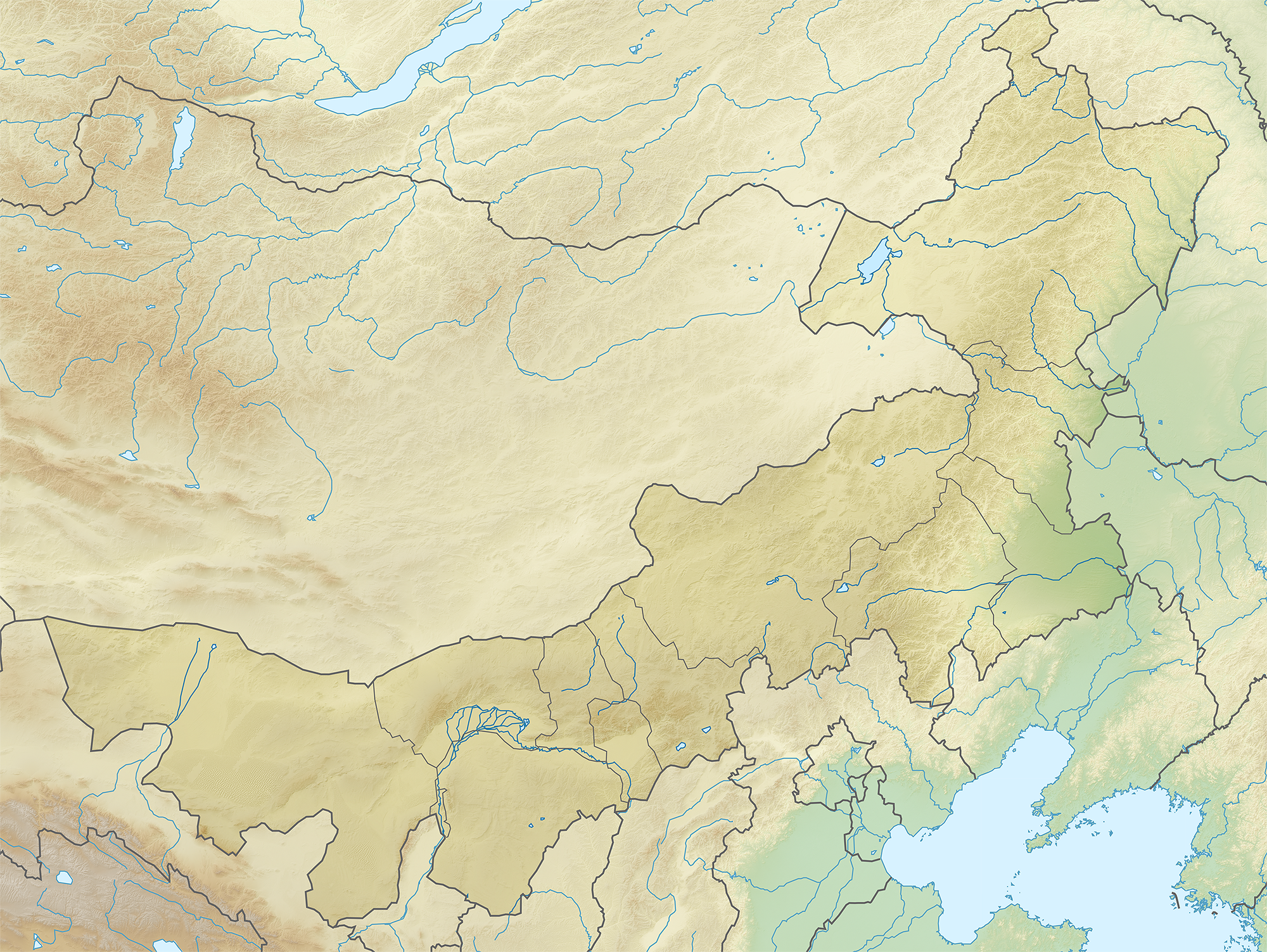
- Location within Inner Mongolia
- Location: Inner Mongolia (China)
- Coordinates: 48°58′23″N 117°26′08″E
- Primary inflows: Kherlen River, Orshuun Gol
- Primary outflows: Mutnaya Protoka (temporal Argun River−Amur Basin tributary)
- Catchment area: 33,469 km^{2} (12,922 sq mi)
- Basin countries: China, Mongolia
- Max. length: 90 km (56 mi)
- Max. width: 27 km (17 mi)
- Surface area: 2,339 km^{2} (903 sq mi)
- Average depth: 5.7 m (19 ft)
- Surface elevation: 539 m (1,768 ft)

Ramsar Wetland
- Official name: Dalai Lake National Nature Reserve, Inner Mongolia
- Designated: 11 January 2002
- Reference no.: 1146

Hulun Lake

Chinese name
- Traditional Chinese: 呼倫湖
- Simplified Chinese: 呼伦湖
- Postal: Hulun Lake
Transcriptions
Standard Mandarin
- Hanyu Pinyin: Hūlún Hú

Mongolian name
- Mongolian Cyrillic: Хөлөн нуур
- Mongolian script: ᠬᠦᠯᠦᠨ ᠨᠠᠭᠤᠷ
Transcriptions
- SASM/GNC: Külün naɣur

Hulun Lake (Note: simplified Chinese: 呼伦湖; traditional Chinese: 呼倫湖; pinyin: Hūlún Hú; Mongolian: Хөлөн нуур, romanized: Khölön nuur; lit. 'foot lake') or Dalai Lake (Note: Mongolian: Далай нуур, romanized: Dalai nuur; lit. 'ocean lake') is a large lake in the Inner Mongolia region of northern China.

== Description ==
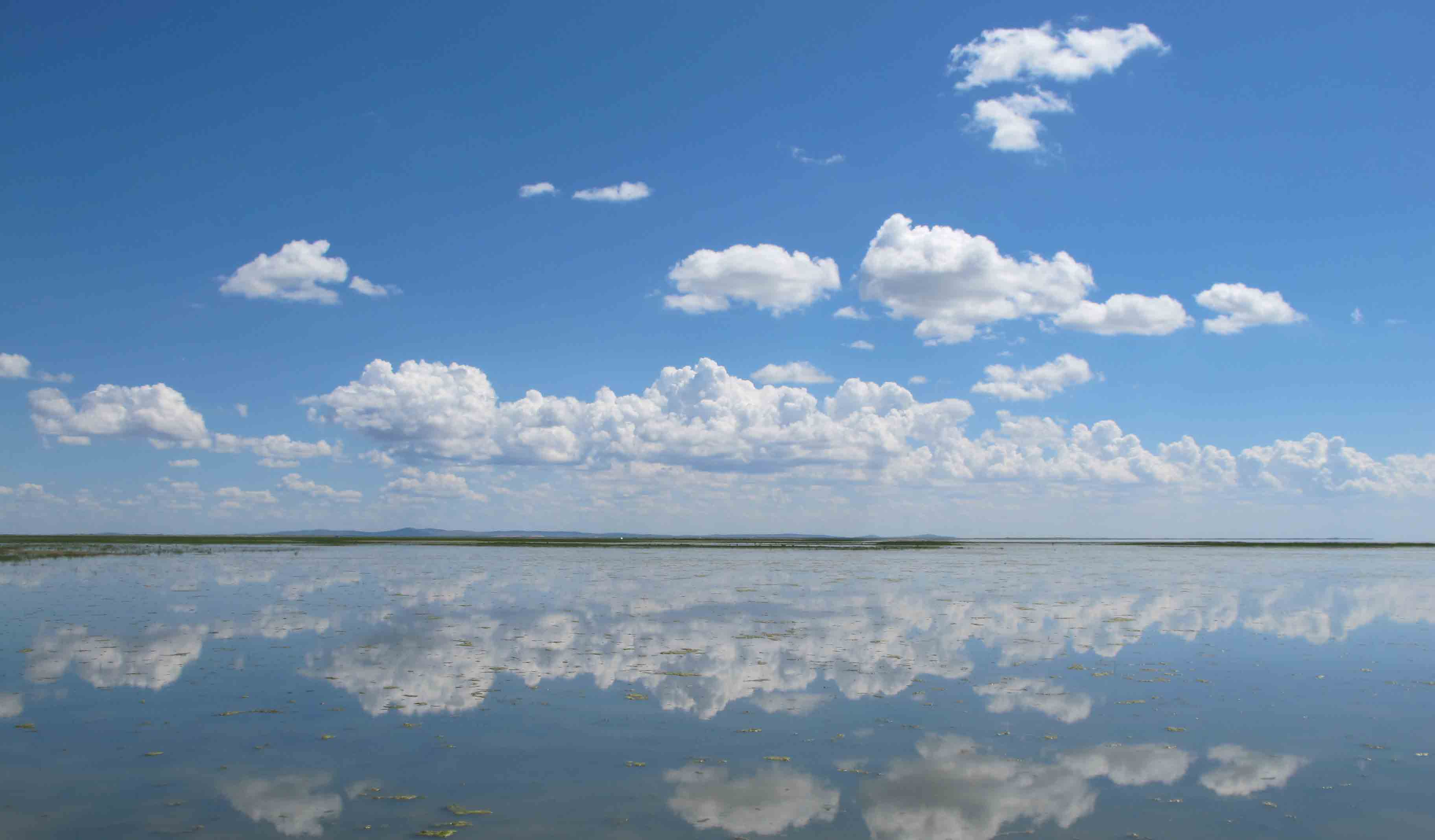
Hulun Lake reflecting clouds and sky.

It is one of the five largest freshwater lakes in all of China, covering approximately 2,339 km^{2}. In years with high precipitation, the normally exit−less endorheic lake may overflow at its northern shore, and the water will meet the Argun River (Ergune) after about 30 kilometres (19 mi).

The lake is not far from Manzhouli, which is on a major passenger rail-line. Although there are several villages nearby, Manzhouli is the nearest city of notable size. As of 1995 annual fish production was about 7,000 tons, 100 tons of shrimp, 4 kilograms of pearls, 1.5 million crayfish. Hulun Lake is also one of the key reed production areas in China.

Hulun Lake and its wetlands are a Biosphere reserve and a Ramsar site of China, Dalai Lake National Nature Reserve.

== See also ==
- Amur River basin
- Endorheic lakes of Asia
