= Khentii Mountains =

Mountain range in Mongolia

- Location within Mongolia

Highest point
- Peak: Asralt Khairkhan
- Elevation: 2,800 m (9,200 ft)

Naming
- Native name: Хэнтийн нуруу (Mongolian)

Geography
- Country: Mongolia
- Provinces: Khentii, Töv and Dornod
- Rivers: Onon, Kherlen and Tuul
- Range coordinates: 48°47′00″N 109°10′01″E

The Khentii Mountains (Mongolian: Хэнтийн нуруу) are a mountain range in the Töv and Khentii Provinces in northeastern Mongolia.

== History ==
The mountains were called the Langjuxu Mountains (狼居胥山) in ancient China. In 119 BC, the Han dynasty army fought the Battle of Mobei with Xiongnu and conducted a series of rituals upon arrival at the place to glorify their victory.

== Geography ==
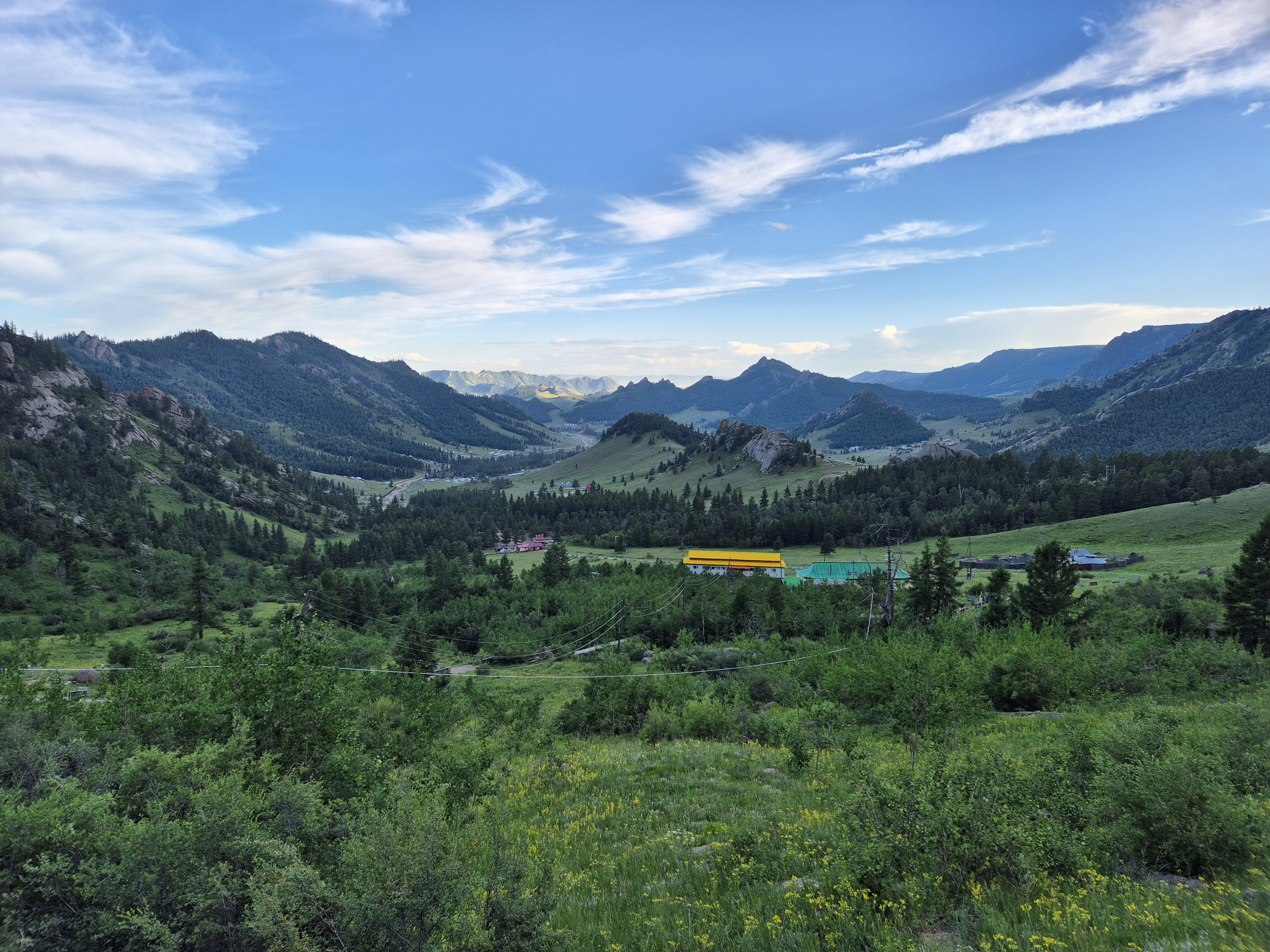
The Khentii Mountains in Terelj, close to the birthplace of Genghis Khan

The mountain chain overlaps the Khan Khentii Strictly Protected Area and includes Mongolia's sacred mountain, Burkhan Khaldun, which is associated with the origin of Genghis Khan. The range forms the watershed between the Arctic Ocean (via Lake Baikal) and the Pacific Ocean basins. Rivers originating in the range include the Onon, Kherlen, Menza and Tuul.

A northern extension of the Khentii Mountains forms a range of the same name which is part of the Khentei-Daur Highlands in the Transbaikalia Krai of Russia.

Genghis Khan, founder of the Mongol Empire, is thought to have chosen a resting place in the Khentii Mountains, called the Great Taboo, or Ikh Khorig, by the Mongols. The area is thought to be where Khan may be entombed.
