= Khan Khentii Strictly Protected Area =

Protected area in Khentii, Mongolia

- IUCN category Ib (wilderness area)
- Location within Mongolia
- Location: Khentii Province, Mongolia
- Coordinates: 48.92°N 108.59°E
- Area: 12,270 km^{2} (4,740 mi^{2})
- Established: 1992

The Khan Khentii Strictly Protected Area is a 12,270 km^{2} (4,740 mi^{2}) government administered Strictly Protected Area in the Khentii aimag (province) in Eastern Mongolia. Strictly Protected Areas are regions of land designated by the Mongolian government as wildlife preservation areas. Herding and tourism are tightly controlled, and hunting and mining are prohibited. However, the budget for maintaining and protecting these areas is quite small.

The Khan Khentii Strictly Protected Area is located in the Khentii Mountains, and includes the sacred Burkhan Khaldun mountain. This is considered to be the birthplace of Genghis Khan, as well as one of the rumored locations of his tomb.
