= Ministry of Environment and Climate Change (Mongolia) =

Ministry of Mongolia, manages environmental and tourism related affairs

- Байгаль Орчин, Уур Амьсгалын Өөрчлөлтийн Яам

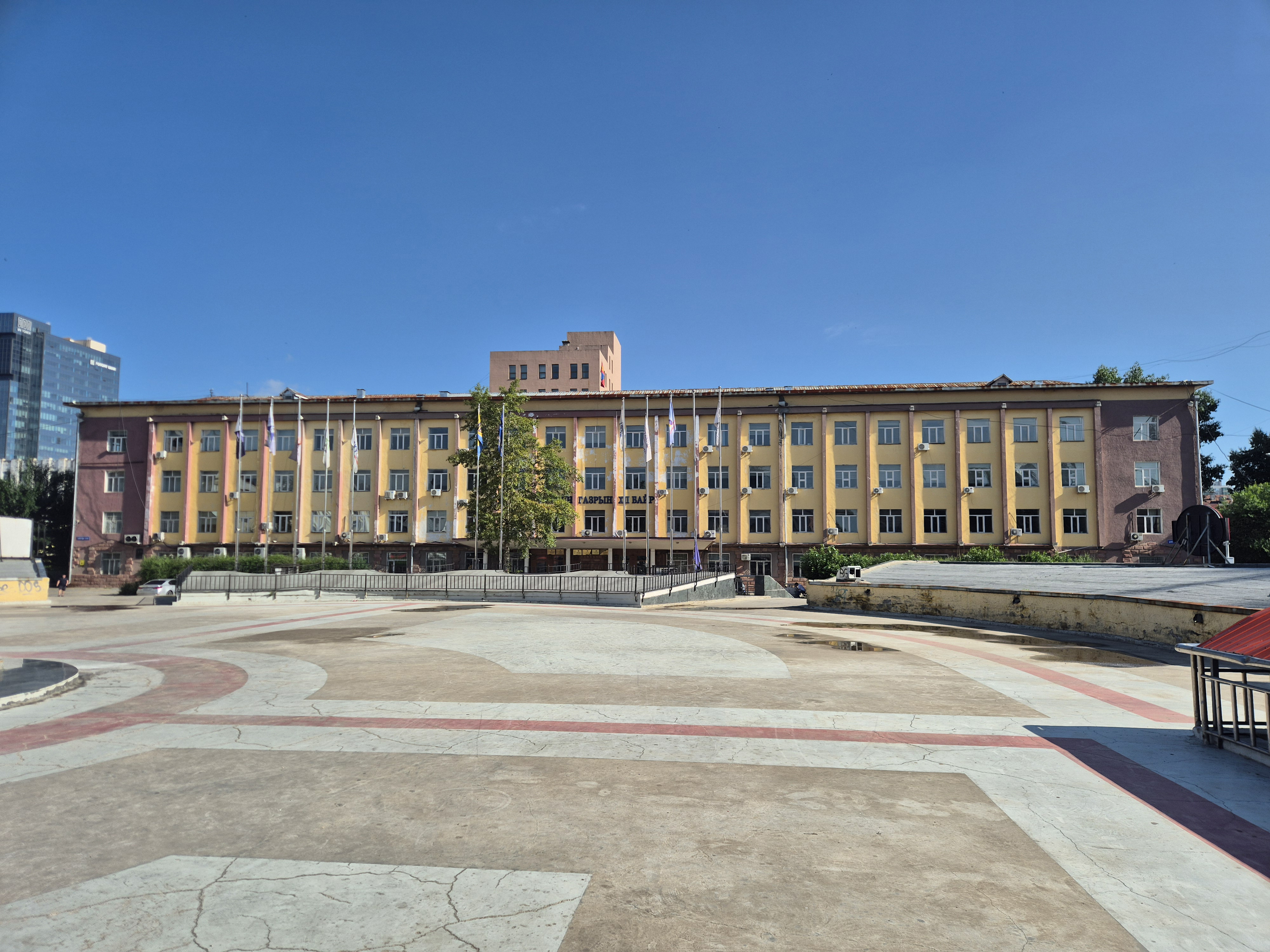
- Government Building 12 which houses the ministry

Agency overview
- Formed: 9 December 1987
- Jurisdiction: Government of Mongolia
- Headquarters: Artsat 624, 23th Khoroo, Khan Uul, Ulaanbaatar, Mongolia
- Employees: 129
- Minister responsible: Bat-Ölziigiin Bat-Erdene
- Deputy Minister responsible: Myagmarjavyn Ganbaatar
- Agency executive: Vacant, State Secretary of Ministry
- Child agencies: National Agency Meteorology and the Environmental Monitoring; Water Management Agency; Forest Department
- Website: met.gov.mn

The Ministry of Environment and Climate Change (Mongolian: Байгаль Орчин, Уур Амьсгалын Өөрчлөлтийн Яам) is a ministry of the Government of Mongolia. It was established in 1987. Ministry is responsible for environmental and tourism related affairs and, it manages special protected areas, including national parks.

== Mission ==
The mission of the Ministry of Environment and Tourism is to guide the approach of economic growth and social development without disturbing the balance of the ecosystem, to maintain environmental stability through the proper use of natural resources, creating opportunities for natural regeneration, and the development of environmentally friendly sustainable tourism, and to ensure the right of people to live in healthy and safe environment by promoting the cooperation and efforts of the government, citizens, and organizations in the implementation of green development goals.

== Structure ==
The Ministry is organised into following departments and divisions:

- Department of Climate Change and Policy Planning
- Department of Public Administration
  - Division of Finance
  - Legal Division
  - Division of Foreign Cooperation
- Department of Natural Resources Policy and Regulation
  - Division of Natural Environment Assessment and Audit
- Department of Environmental Policy and Regulation
- Department of Special Protected Area Policy and Regulation
- Department of Tourism Policy and Regulation
- Department of Monitoring, Evaluation and Internal Audit
- Department of Sectoral Inspection

== Affiliated governmental organizations ==
The ministry manages and directs operation of three Implementing agencies of the Government, National Agency Meteorology and the Environmental Monitoring, Water Management Agency, Forest Department, 34 Protected Area Administration of special protected areas, 21 Administration of river basins, state owned research centers, as well as local agencies of environment and tourism.

== See also ==
- Government of Mongolia
- Geography of Mongolia
- Wildlife of Mongolia
- Tourism in Mongolia
