= Gurvan Saikhan Mountains =

Gurvansaikhan Mountains
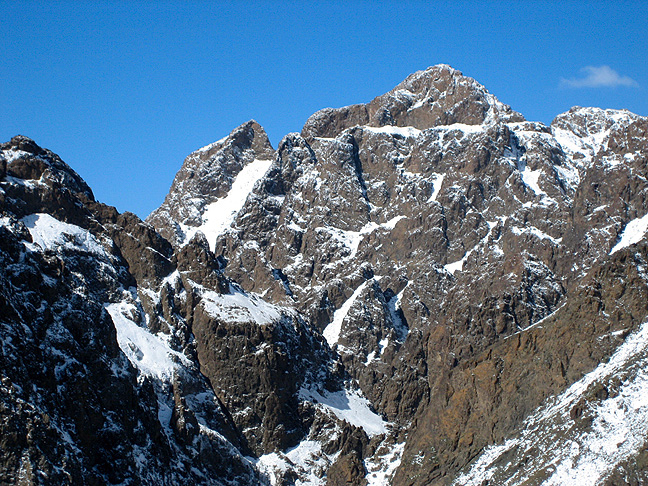
- Peaks of Zuun Saikhany Nuruu after a September snowstorm

Highest point
- Peak: Dund Saikhany Nuruu
- Elevation: 2,825 m (9,268 ft)
- Coordinates: 43°38′06″N 103°46′45″E

Naming
- Native name: Гурван Сайхан (Mongolian)

Geography
- Country: Mongolia
- Aimags: Ömöngovi
- Region: Gobi Desert
- Geological features: Yolyn Am
- Parent range: Gobi-Altai Mountains (Altai Mountains)

The Gurvan Saikhan (Mongolian: Гурван Сайхан, lit. "three beauties"), is a mountain range in the Ömnögovi Province of southern Mongolia. It is named for three subranges: Baruun Saikhany Nuruu (the Western Beauty), Dund Saikhany Nuruu (the Middle Beauty) and Zuun Saikhany Nuruu (the Eastern Beauty).

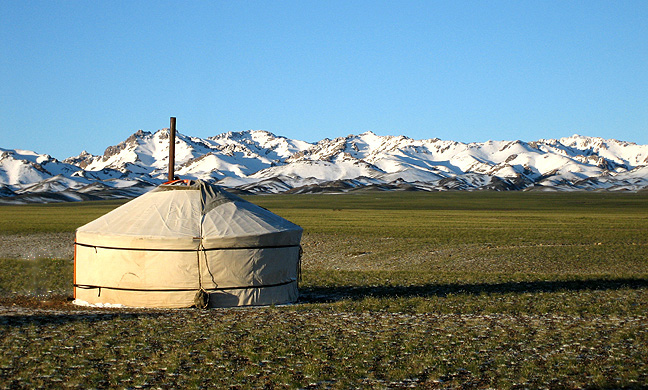
A yurt in front of the Gurvansaikhan Mountains

The highest peak is found in Dund Saikhany Nuruu, and is 9,268 feet (2,825 meters) above sea level. A notable gorge, Yolyn Am, is found in Zuun Saikhany Nuruu. Though the range is surrounded by the Gobi Desert, Yolyn Am contains a semi-permanent ice field.

The range forms the eastern part of the Gobi Gurvansaikhan National Park which was established in 1993.
