= Tourism in Mongolia =

Altai Tavan Bogd massif, the highest mountain range in Mongolia, located in the westernmost province of Bayan-Ölgii

Bactrian camels at Khongoryn Els in the Gobi Gurvansaikhan National Park

Lake Khövsgöl, the largest freshwater lake in the country, situated in Khövsgöl Province

Tourism in Mongolia is a relatively small component of the modern economy of Mongolia. Prior to the COVID-19 pandemic, tourism was reported by the World Bank to be the third-largest economic sector after mining and agriculture, accounting 7.2% of the total GDP in 2019. Since the lockdowns in 2021, visitors to Mongolia have steadily increased, surpassing pre-pandemic levels in 2023.

Travel organizations in Mongolia date back to half a century ago, but the private sector-based tourism is barely twenty years old. Now, Mongolia boasts 403 travel companies, 320 hotels, 647 resorts and tourist camps, all employing the graduates from over 56 educational establishments. As member of the United Nations World Tourism Organization, Mongolia takes an active part in implementing sustainable tourism.

As one of the least densely populated countries in the world, much of Mongolia's tourism is based on its landscapes and nomadic culture. 8.6% of the total landmass (134,964.02 km^{2}) are protected as national parks, which include parts of the Mongolian–Manchurian grassland, the Gobi Desert, and extensive mountain, river, and lake systems. Although backpacking is becoming more common, travel outside the capital and largest city, Ulaanbaatar, is mostly arranged by tour operator companies due to limited infrastructure and local labour. With domestic and international travel peaking in July and August, most visitors travel in summer, when the weather is the warmest.

== History and overview ==
During the socialist regime which lasted from 1921 to 1990, tourism was somewhat limited and controlled by the state. The Foreign Tourist Office, part of the Ministry of Foreign Economic Relations and Supply, handled all foreign tourists. In the late 1980s, tourism had played a minor role in Mongolian foreign economic relations. It was reported about 10,000 foreign visitors came from Eastern Bloc, North American, and Western European countries. Then popular natural, historical, and cultural sites included the "dinosaur graveyard" of Nemegt Basin, the medieval city of Karakorum, and the Erdene Zuu Monastery.

Following Mongolia's democratic transition, efforts to boost tourism were taken in the wake of the collapse of the USSR, which severely impacted the Soviet-reliant economy. To boost foreign investment in tourism, the Government of Mongolia offers special tax exemption equaling up to 10 percent of the total investment if offered for construction of high-rated hotels and tourist complexes. Licenses for tourism business were abolished and service provided by tour operators for expatriate visitors is now exempt from VAT. Standards and regulations are largely non-restrictive, with no complicated layers of bureaucracy issuing permission and exercising control. A vivid example of the successful reform of the legal framework is the progressive increase of the number of visitors – the number reaching 450,000 in 2010 - tripling the 2000 estimate.

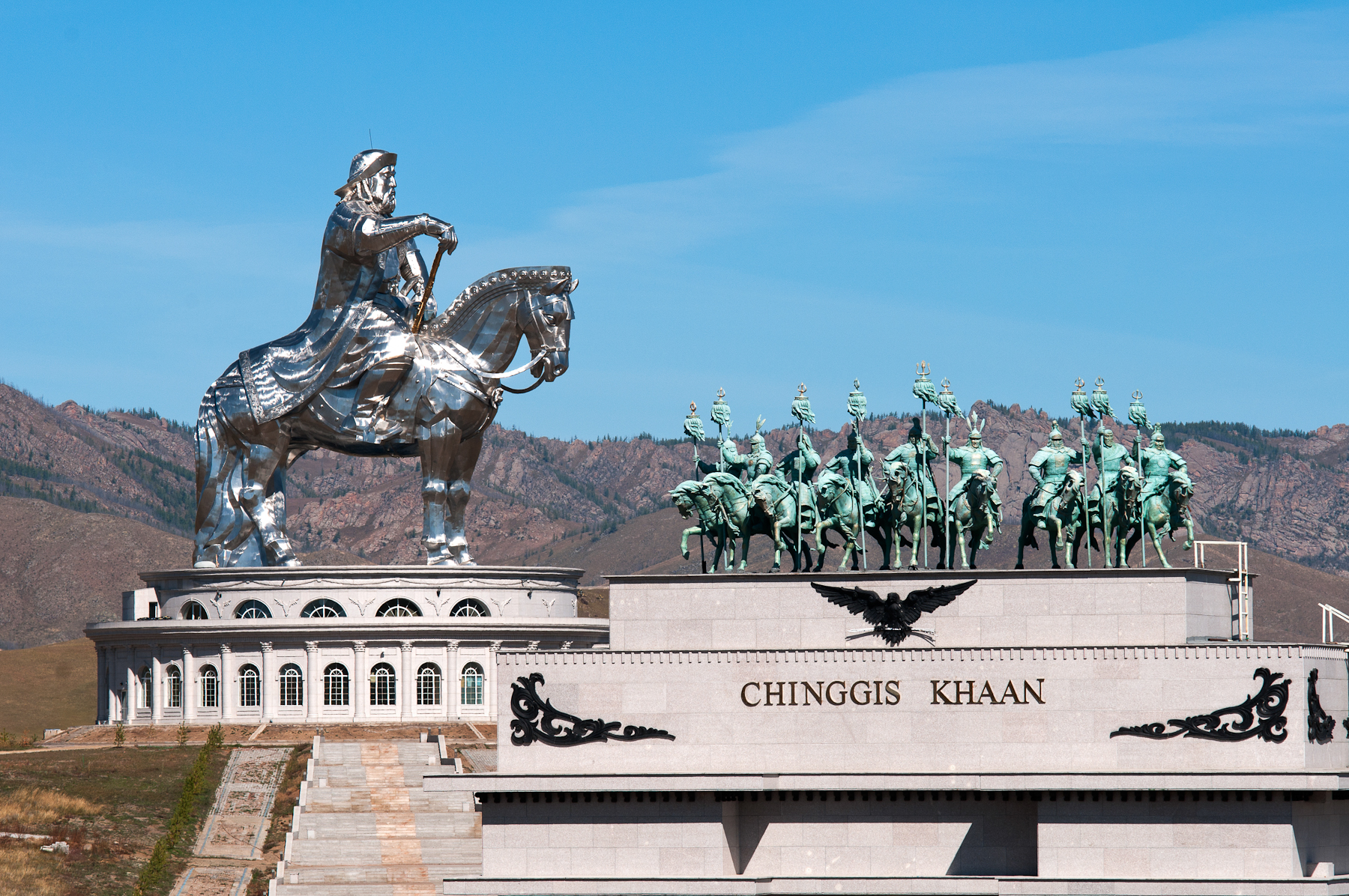
Equestrian statue of Chinggis Khaan, located in the eastern suburbs of Ulaanbaatar, considered the tallest equestrian statue in the world.

In January 2013, the Ministry of Culture, Sport and Tourism approved official slogan for Mongolia's tourism called “Go Nomadic, Experience Mongolia” which, it believes, will properly position help boost tourism industry in Mongolia. However, after a year the Ministry replaced the official slogan to new "Mongolia - Nomadic by Nature."

On 5 March 2014, during ITB Berlin 2014 exhibition in Germany, officials from the Ministry of Culture, Sports and Tourism signed an agreement to become official partner country for ITB Berlin 2015.

Activity travels available include trekking, climbing, bird watching, horse riding, rafting, camel riding, yak caravan and overland motorcycle tours. Many of these tours focus strongly on ecology and wildlife, and almost all of them include the Gobi Desert as one of their destinations; apart from its numerous native animal species, the desert is famous for its fossilised dinosaur bones and eggs. Mongolia's lakes represent another good hiking destination, as do the Four Holy Peaks surrounding Ulaanbaatar or the Gobi Gurvansaikhan National Park, in the Ömnögovi Province. The economy of Mongolia is expecting "unstoppable" growth as its natural resources are tapped, which will enable further investment in infrastructure.

In July 2021, the Chinggis Khaan International Airport was opened to replace the Buyant-Ukhaa International Airport, the country's main international airport built in 1957. The new international airport, with doubled capacity, was primarily financed and constructed with Japanese support. Further deals for airport expansion were signed between the two sides in September 2026.

In 2023, Mongolia decided to promote tourism and allow visitors from 34 countries enter the country visa-free until the end of 2025. Among the countries which citizens can enter Mongolia visa-free are all the European Union countries (except for Germany, which have already had visa-free entry to Mongolia), the UK, Australia and New Zealand. In August 2023, Prime Minister Luvsannamsrain Oyun-Erdene visited Washington DC to announce the signing of an Open Skies Agreement between Mongolia and the United States. Following this agreement, United Airlines’ inaugural flight to Mongolia took place in May 2025.

Street art in downtown Ulaanbaatar

=== Go Mongolia ===
In January 2024, the Government of Mongolia launched Go Mongolia, a national branding campaign aimed at promoting the country's tourism and investment opportunities. According to official figures, the campaign contributed to Mongolia receiving 808,956 tourists in 2024, reportedly generating $1.6 billion USD in tourism revenue. In June 2024, Go Mongolia was announced as the official training kit sponsor and tourism destination partner of Fulham Football Club, a Premier League team based in London.

== Events ==
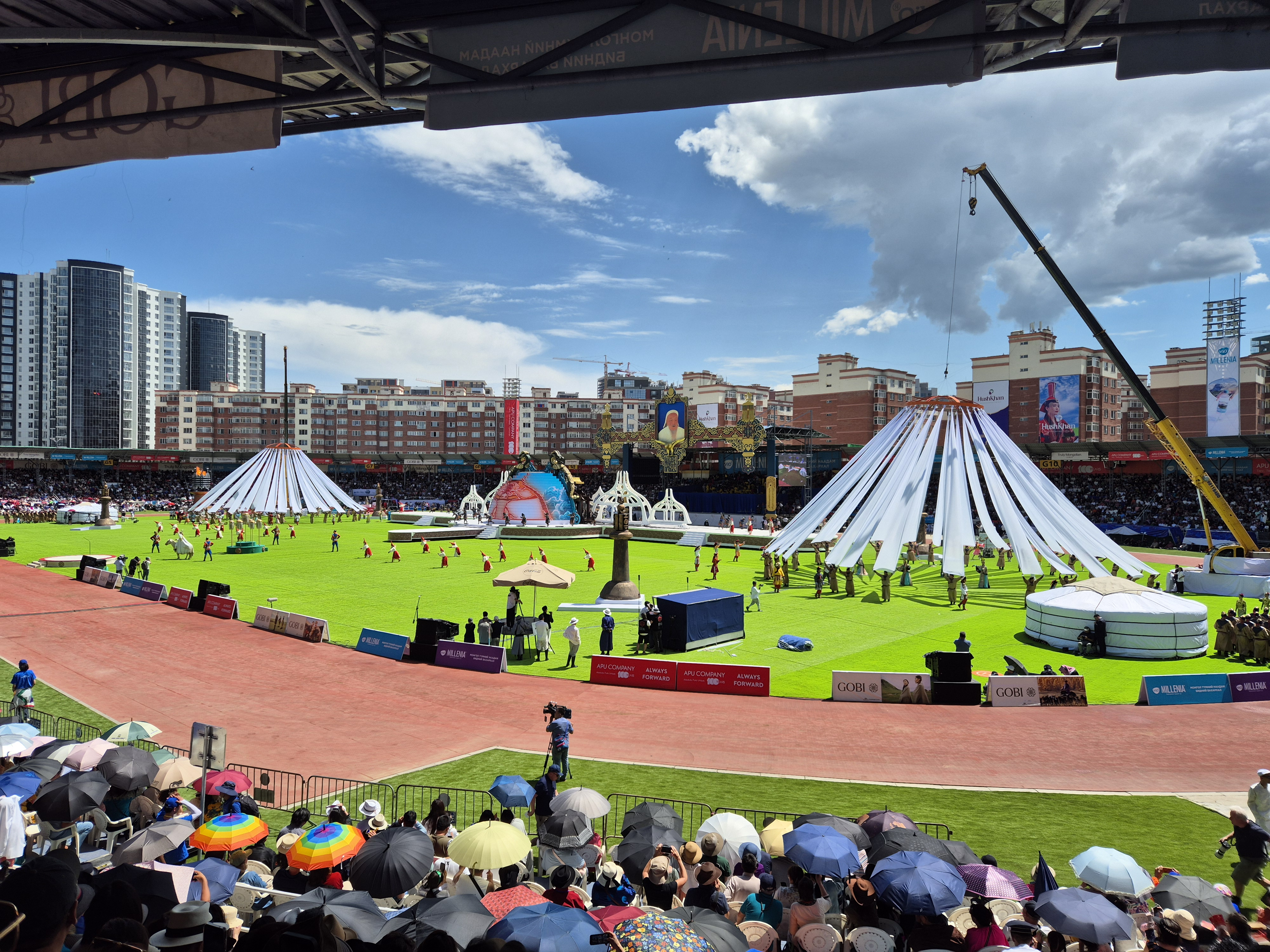
Opening ceremony of the National Naadam Festival in July 2024

Masked tsam dancers during Danshig Naadam and Khuree Tsam in 2015

Kazakh eagle hunters during the Golden Eagle Festival in Bayan-Ölgii Province

One of the major festivals held in the country is Naadam (lit. 'games'), which has been celebrated by the Mongols for centuries. The National Naadam, the largest one in the country, is held on July 11 to July 13, a date commemorating the 1921 People's Revolution, at the National Sports Stadium in Ulaanbaatar. Local and provincial naadams throughout the country are held at a relatively smaller scale throughout late June and July. Naadam consists of the three Mongolian traditional sports: archery, long-distance horse-racing, and Mongolian wrestling. The traditional celebration was added to the UNESCO Intangible cultural heritages in 2010.

Another major form of Naadam is the Danshig Naadam, representing the Buddhist religious and cultural heritage of the Mongols. The rituals date back to 1639, when the Zanabazar was enthroned as the first Bogd Jebtsundamba Khutuktu, the spiritual leader of the Mongols. Tsam dance is an integral part of the traditional ceremonies that take place during the celebrations.

In 2013, The Ministry of Culture, Sport and Tourism of Mongolia published Mongolia Tourism Calendar of Events 2013, in which the Ministry collected all public events related to Mongolian tourism and culture.

- Golden Eagle Festival - held twice a year in Bayan-Ölgii and near Ulaanbaatar, hunters use trained eagles to catch small prey, plus Kazakh horse games. A similar event, Sagsai Golden Eagle Festival, is annually held in September in Sagsai, Bayan-Ölgii
- Nowruz - in Ölgii, Kazakh New Years parade, concert, and feast
- Tsagaan Sar - Lunar New Year festival held throughout Mongolia
- Camel Festival - Mongolian winter tourism festival held in Ömnögovi Province. The Thousand Camel Festival in the Gobi desert introduces the tradition of camel breeding and herding. It is in Bulgan county, Umnugovi province. The festival celebrates and promote the cultural heritage of Bactrian camels and winter tourism growth in Mongolia. The festival includes two types of camel races, Camel-Polo, and some other competitions related to camel breeders’ cultural heritage, such as training of untamed camels, making ropes from camel wool, and loading. The festival is held annually March 6–7 for two days at Bulgan county, South Gobi province, Mongolia. The festival is one of the heart touching events because of the camel training and other activities related to the camel breeding tradition.
- Blue Pearl Ice Festival - Winter tourism event held at Khuvsgul lake
- Agtana Khureet Festival
- Goyol Fashion Festival
- Miss Mongolia - Beauty pageant to select the country's Miss World, candidate
- Playtime Festival - Music festival in Ulaanbaatar
- Ulaanbaatar Marathon

== Transportation ==
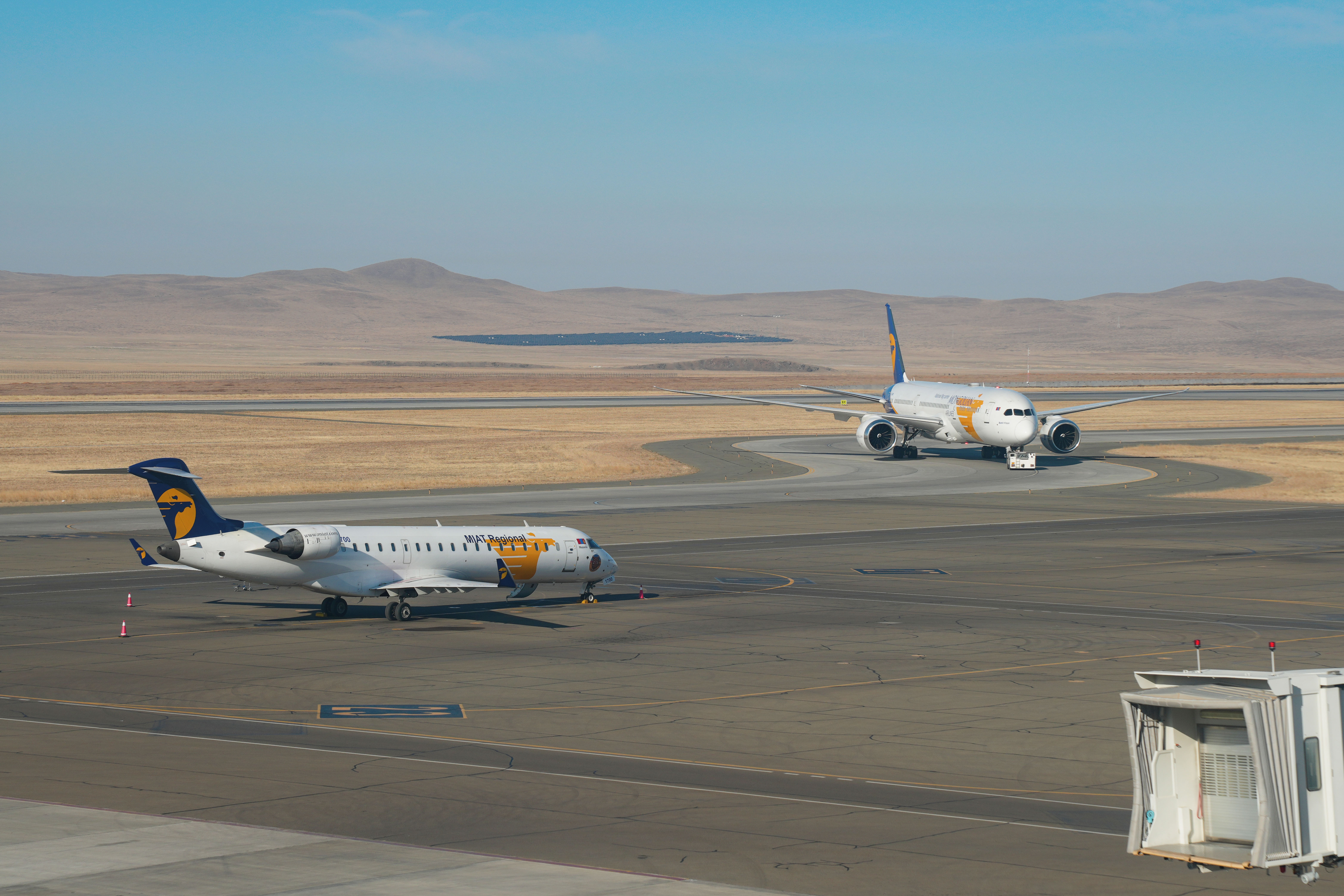
Aircraft of MIAT Mongolian Airlines, the national airline of Mongolia, in Ulaanbaatar

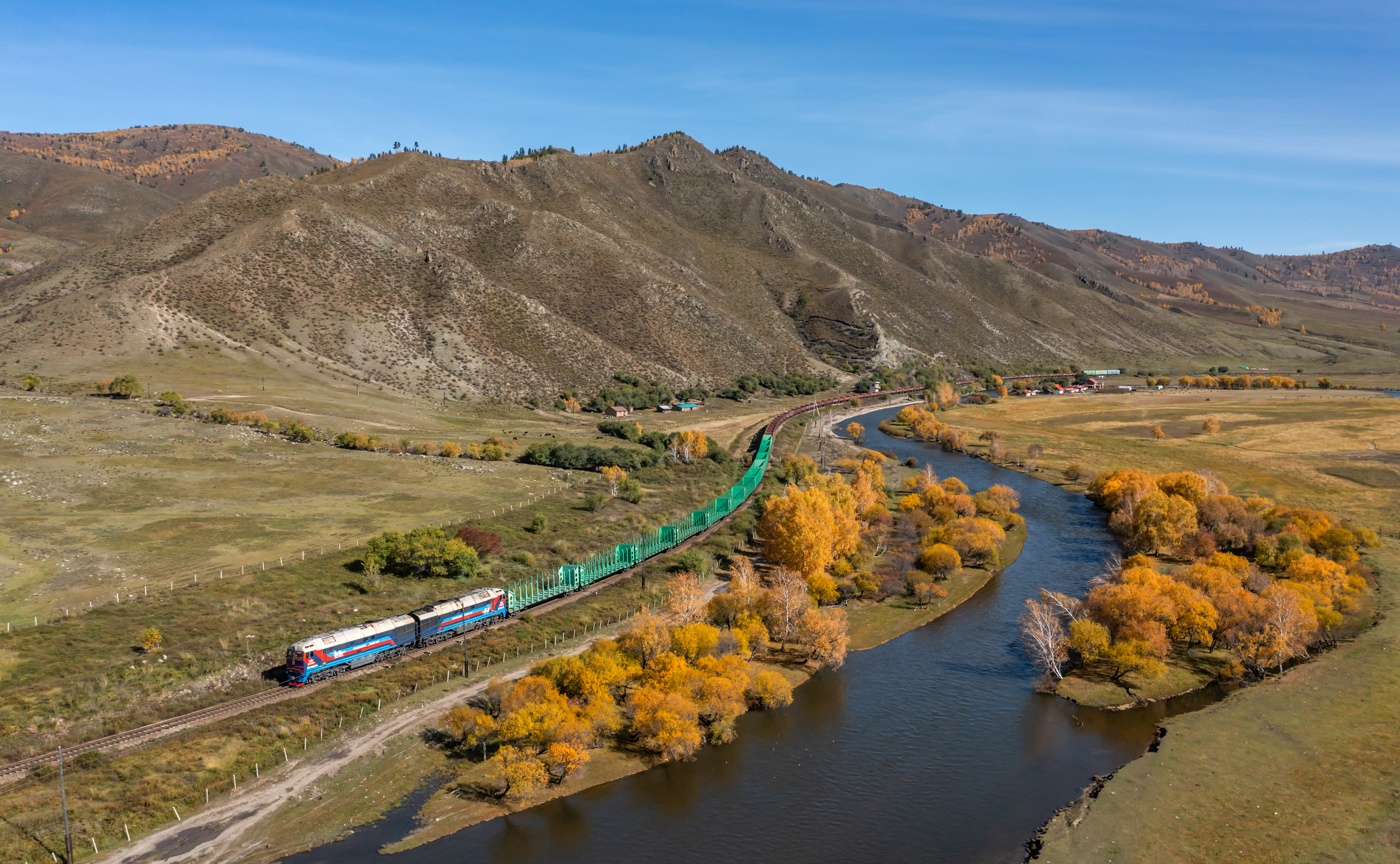
Trans-Mongolian Railway passing through Selenge Province

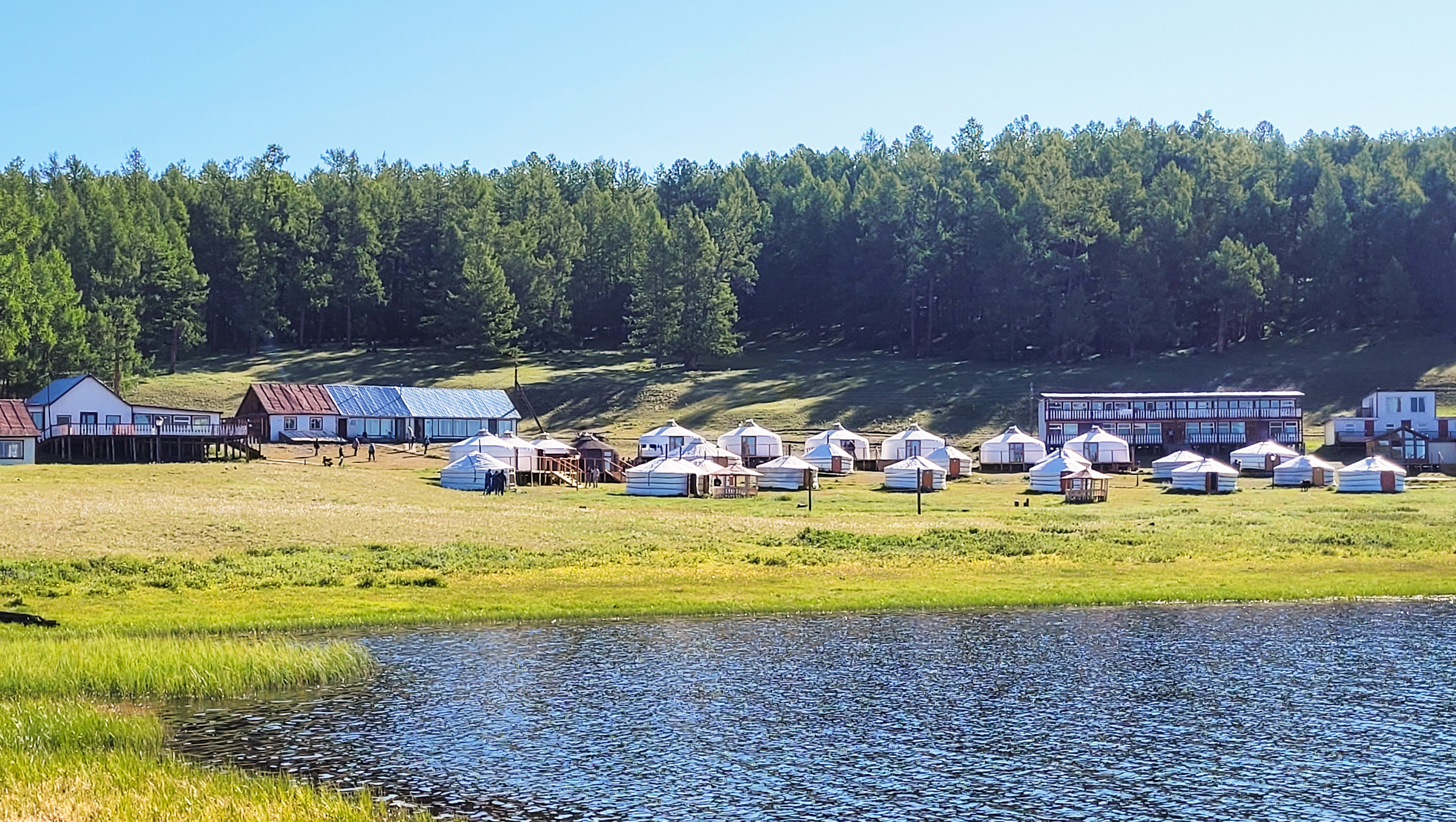
Tourist camp near Lake Khövsgöl

Chinggis Khaan International Airport in Ulaanbaatar is the major international airport in the country, offering scheduled flights to and from Russia, China, South Korea, Singapore, Japan, Germany and Turkey.

- MIAT Mongolian Airlines is the national flag air carrier and serves only international destinations such as Moscow, Frankfurt, Berlin, Paris, Beijing, Hong Kong, Seoul, Busan, Singapore, Tokyo, Osaka (operated during summer time) and chartered flights.
- United Airlines launched flights between Ulaanbaatar and Tokyo's Narita International Airport in May 2024.
- Hunnu Air (former Mongolian Airlines Group), founded in 2011, flies both domestically and internationally (Shanghai - (temporary discontinued as of October 2013) and Manzhouli).
- Domestic destinations within Mongolia are also served by Aero Mongolia.

Other international airports in the country include Ölgii International Airport and Altai Airport in the Western provinces, and Mörön Airport in the North. Domestic airports are present in all provinces except Dornogovi, Govisümber, Selenge, Orkhon, and Darkhan-Uul Province, which are close to Ulaanbaatar and the rail network.

The Trans-Mongolian Line connects Ulaanbaatar and several other cities in Central Mongolia with the Trans-Siberian Railway in Russia as well as Railway in China. The railway runs from China to Russia and connects with Ulan-Ude in Russia and Jining in China. Notable stops in Mongolia include Sükhbaatar, Darkhan, Choir, and Zamyn-Üüd / Erenhot. Additionally, there are important branches leading to both Erdenet, the third-largest city, and Baganuur. All provincial capitals of the 21 provinces are linked via paved road. Though, majority of the country's official road networks are unpaved cross-country tracks and dirt trails.

== Statistics ==
Tourist arrivals of 2024 in %

Yearly tourist arrivals in thousands

=== International arrivals ===
Most visitors arriving to Mongolia on short term basis for tourism were from the following countries of nationality:

Country	H1 2026	2025	2024	2023	2022	2021	2020	2019	2018
Russia	154,822	233,595	211,977	212,332	153,162	12,525	29,635	141,927	129,095
China	115,837	225,113	176,907	108,869	11,186	5,763	13,513	168,298	163,979
South Korea	55,213	182,507	175,292	139,512	53,382	2,312	5,060	101,279	84,184
Japan	13,966	33,894	24,792	19,600	6,411	377	1,131	24,419	20,990
Kazakhstan	9,120	23,990	23,912	20,537	17,555	727	1,509	16,264	16,144
United States	9,009	19,397	14,963	13,539	8,562	1,570	1,147	18,838	17,838
Germany	8,915	16,729	11,604	9,275	3,994	511	599	12,405	10,819
Turkey	6,921	12,750	7,255	6,108	3,453	1,401	545	1,874	2,699
Taiwan	4,324	12,020	11,601	5,129	317	30	95	5,930	5,233
France	3,496	8,122	6,056	5,677	2,863	213	305	10,572	9,773
Belarus	3,749	6,412	6,706	6,902	4,029	4,026	2,090	2,902	2,210
Australia	2,356	5,285	3,527	3,437	1,340	132	383	7,014	7,495
Uzbekistan	1,506	4,912	5,002	902	529	44	16	244	118
United Kingdom	2,244	4,820	3,800	3,319	1,578	182	302	5,931	5,905
Italy	1,432	4,193	3,213	2,488	1,007	174	74	3,655	3,192
Hong Kong	1,881	3,504	2,268	2,622	244	8	147	4,311	3,121
Singapore	1,462	3,359	2,645	2,610	753	29	65	3,010	2,649
India	1,589	3,095	2,127	1,929	1,041	194	184	2,478	2,298
Malaysia	1,327	2,760	1,822	2,235	1,034	71	53	2,062	1,731
Canada	1,357	2,625	2,099	1,952	1,103	123	169	3,594	3,578
Vietnam	1,092	2,524	2,231	1,570	1,309	14	65	1,061	704
Philippines	1,305	2,316	1,639	1,091	468	54	79	1,204	1,169
Thailand	911	1,986	1,797	2,004	618	93	127	2,631	2,259
Switzerland	820	1,965	1,635	1,356	686	66	76	2,927	2,665
Spain	648	1,833	1,348	1,003	419	35	48	2,080	1,969
Netherlands	888	1,820	1,544	1,278	792	63	86	3,613	3,777
Kyrgyzstan	573	1,632	1,883	1,515	774	107	57	727	524
Other countries	10,909	24,012	17,741	15,222	7,673	2,256	1,299	26,050	23,252
Total	417,672	847,170	727,386	594,013	286,282	33,100	58,859	577,300	529,370
Source: National Statistics Office of Mongolia (NSO), inbound tourists by country of nationality. H1 2026 covers January–June 2026. Totals include all nationalities, not only those listed. NSO counts are lower than the border-crossing totals published by the Mongolian Tourism Association (808,956 for 2024), which include all foreign entries other than for study, work or permanent residence.

== See also ==
- National Museum of Mongolia
- List of museums in Mongolia
- Visa policy of Mongolia
- Mongolian cuisine
- Geography of Mongolia
- Climate of Mongolia
- Trans-Siberian Railway
