= Wildlife of Mongolia =

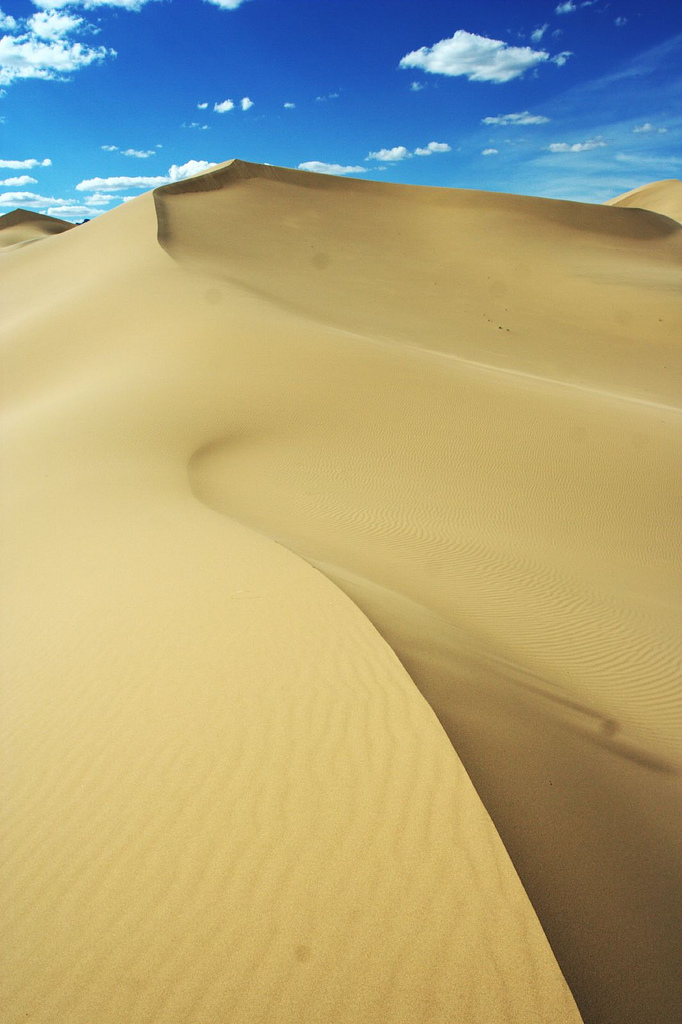
Dunes in Gobi Gurvansaikhan National Park; the Gobi Desert is the fifth largest desert in the world.

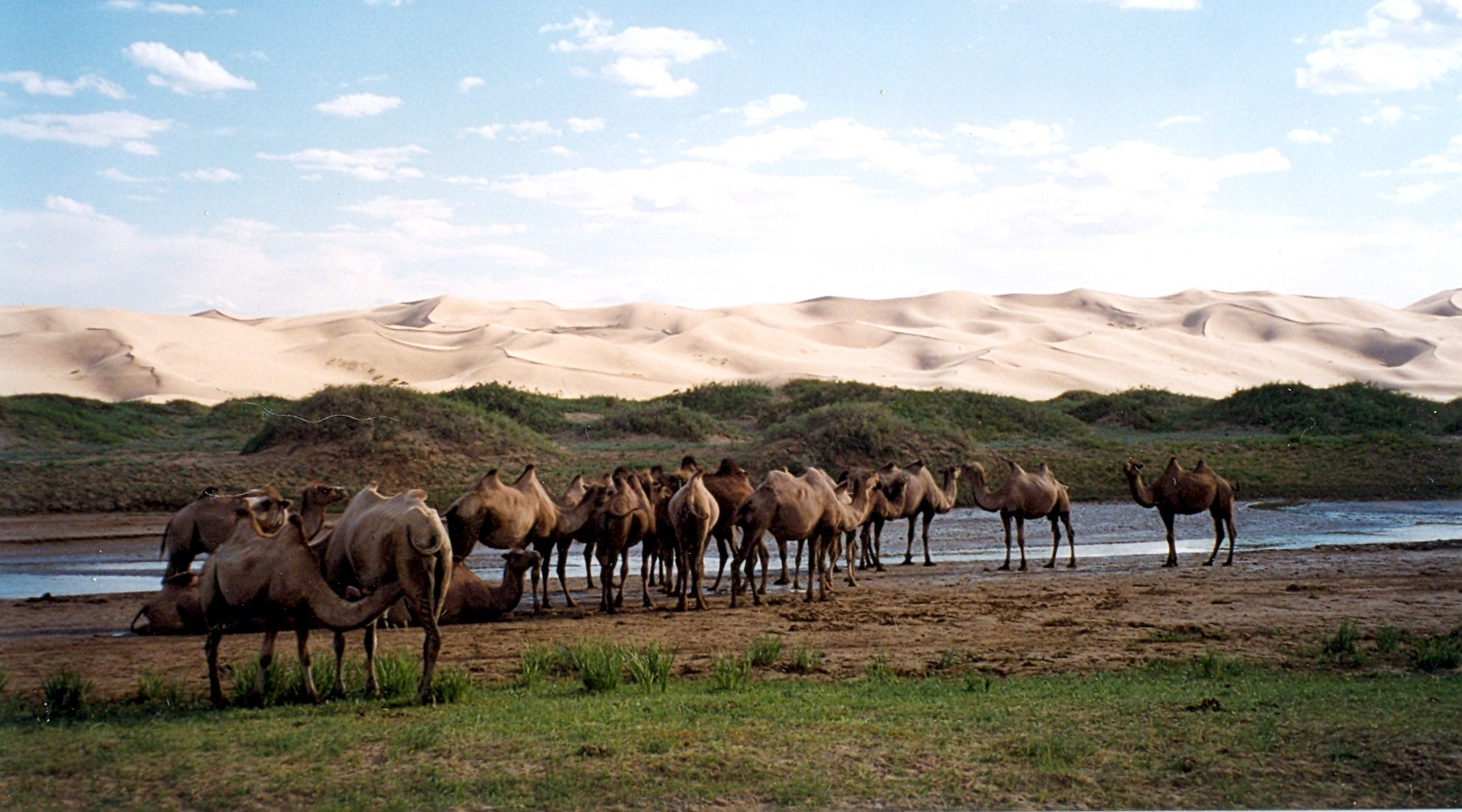
Bactrian camels in the sand dunes of Khongoryn Els, Gobi Gurvansaikhan National Park, in Ömnögovi Province.

The wildlife of Mongolia consists of flora, fauna and funga found in the harsh habitats dictated by the diverse climatic conditions found throughout the country. In the north, there are salty marshes and fresh-water sources. The centre has desert steppes. In the south, there are semi deserts as well as the hot Gobi Desert in the south, the fifth-largest desert in the world.

About 90% of the landlocked country is covered by deserts or pastures with extreme climatic conditions. Fauna in the wild includes 139 mammal species, 448 bird species (331 of which are migratory and 119 are resident), 76 fish species, 22 reptile species and 6 amphibian species. Grassland and shrubland covers 55 percent of the country. In the steppe zone, forest covers only 6 percent while 36 percent is covered by desert vegetation, and only 1 percent is used for human habitation and agriculture. The vegetation in the eastern steppe region is grassland (the largest of its type in the world).

== Geography ==
=== Topography ===
The country is bounded by Tibet, Afghan Turkestan, Siberia, and Northeast China. This has resulted in a faunal richness that combines the species from each of the border nations. Habitat distribution consists of grassland, shrubland and forest covering 55 percent of the country, while forest cover is 98 percent in the steppe zone, 36 percent is covered by desert vegetation.

=== Water resources ===
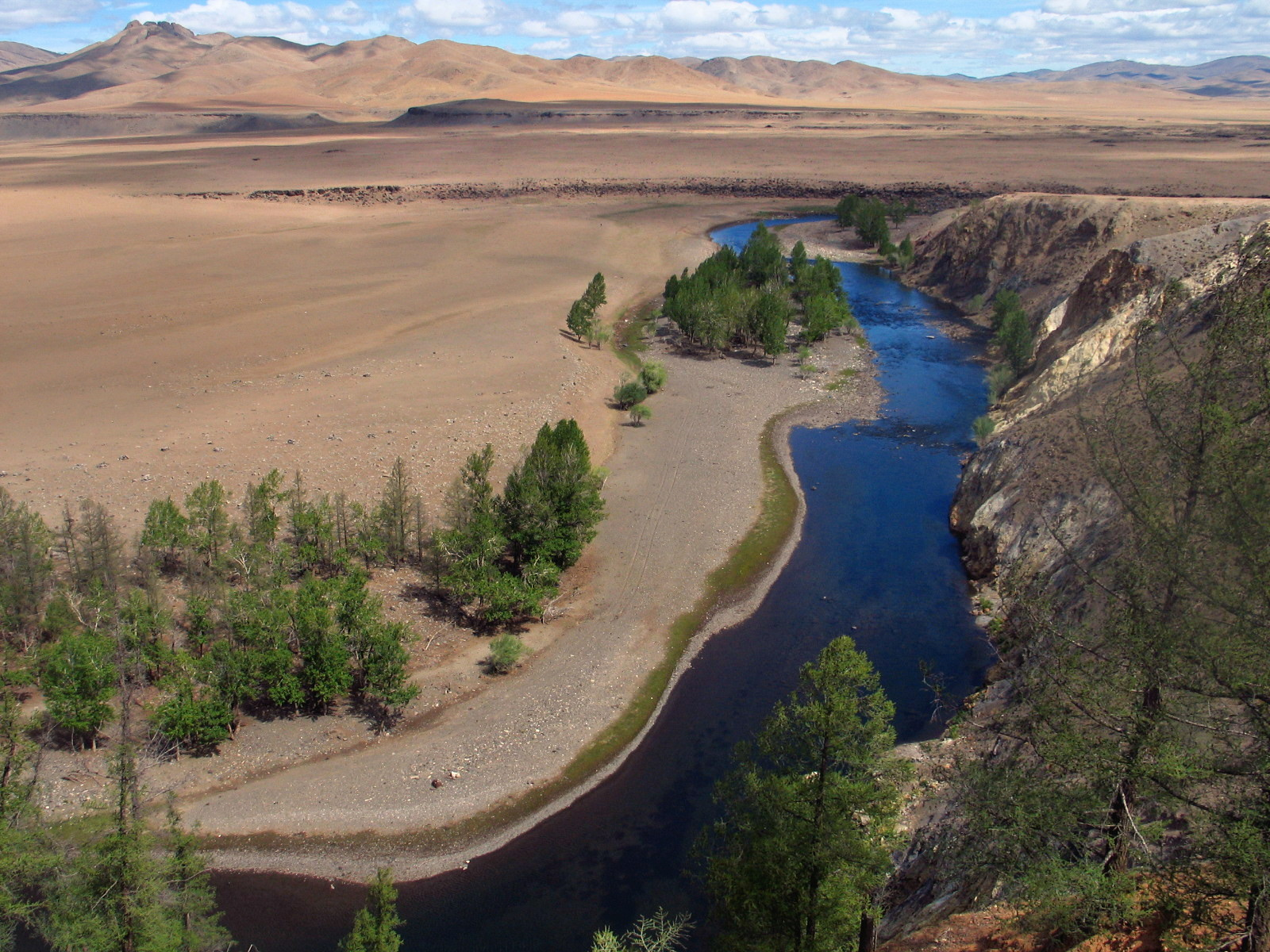
Orkhon River

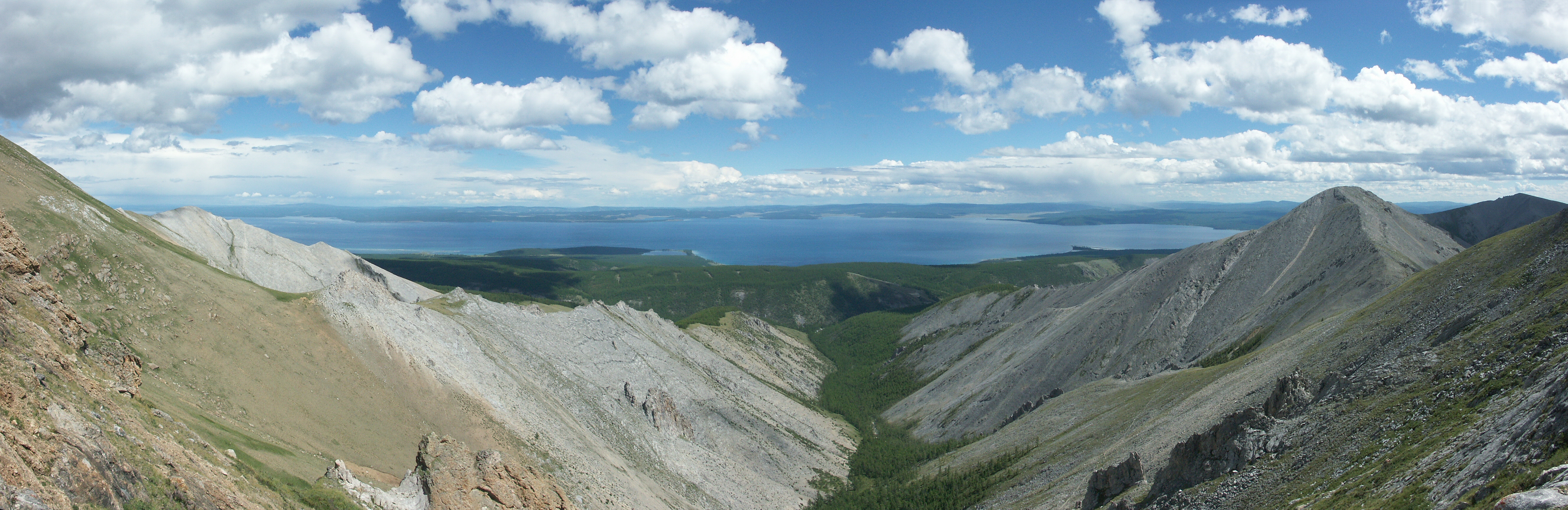
Panoramic view of Lake Khövsgöl

The drainage pattern is dictated by Asia's continental divide. This separates areas that drain to the Arctic Ocean from those that drain northeast into the Pacific. The Khangai Mountains form another divide between areas that drain into the oceans and those that drain inland. In the western and southern zones, streams flow seasonally into salt water lakes without outlets. Rivers of the northern region are perennial, rising from the mountains. The two major river systems are the Orkhon River (Mongolia's longest inland river within the country, which joins the Selenge River) and the Selenge River (Selenga in Russian). Lakes in the country are mostly saline. The largest by volume is freshwater Lake Khövsgöl, a natural lake formed in a structural depression. It is the second oldest lake in the world and accounts for 65 percent of the fresh water of Mongolia (2 percent of that in the world). To reduce the burden on water resources, Mongolia is building wastewater treatment plants to use it in industry and prevent discharge into rivers.

=== Climate ===
The climatic conditions dictated by the oceans on one side and the snow-capped mountains (average peak elevation of 5,180 metres (16,990 ft) in high northern latitudes) on the other side, have a significant bearing on the wildlife distribution in the country. The climate patterns are: continental climate with very cold conditions (anticyclones are formed here over Siberia) and cool to hot summers in the deserts and semi deserts. Temperature records indicate a very wide variation between winter and summer, of the order of 80 °F (44 °C) on average in the northern part of the country, and even on a single day the variation can be as much as 55 °F (31 °C). In the Ulaanbaatar area the typical variation reported is −7 °F (−22 °C) in January and 63 °F (17 °C) in July while in the Gobi Desert area, the average temperature reported for January is 5 °F (−15 °C) and 7 °F (−14 °C) in July.

=== Precipitation ===
Rainfall and snow are also very uneven, dependent on elevation and latitude. Annual amounts range from low-lying desert areas of the south and west where it is less than 4 inches (100 mm) to northern mountainous areas, where it is reported as about 14 inches (360 mm), while at Ulaanbaatar the reported annual rainfall is 10 inches (250 mm). The number of days the sky remains clear and sunny is between 220 and 260 annually. Fierce blizzards occur in the mountain regions and the steppes. During this period a thin layer of snow totally stops grazing in these pastures.

== Legal protection ==
Commercial exploitation increased between the seventeenth and twentieth centuries, necessitating increased legislation. Two laws were enacted in 1995, the Mongolian Law on Environmental Protection and the Mongolian Law on Hunting. The steppe habitat for Mongolian gazelle (Procapra gutturosa), an area of 275,000 square kilometres (106,000 sq mi), is reported to be the "largest remaining example of a temperate grassland ecosystem".

== Protected areas ==
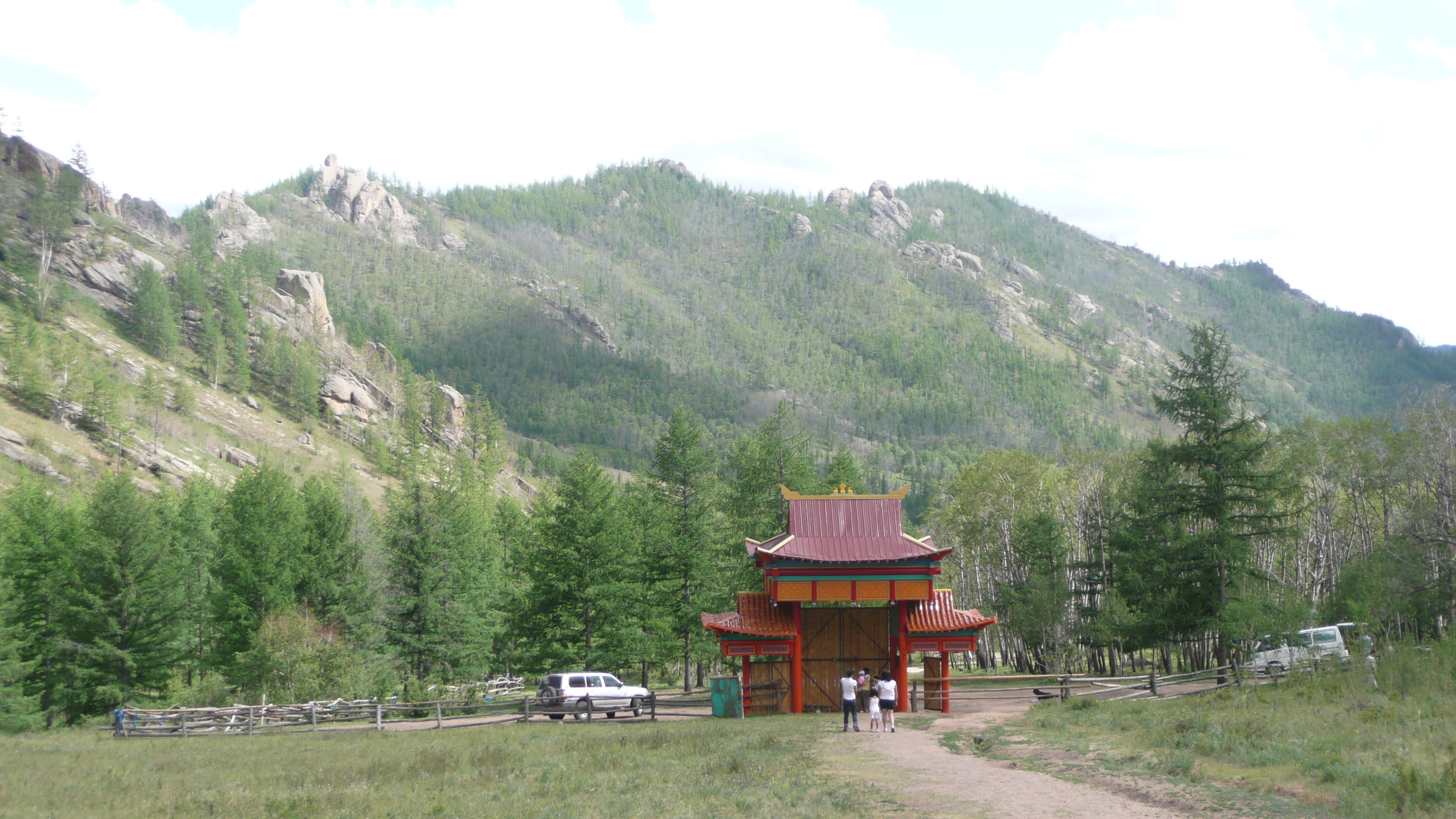
View from the monastery at Gorkhi-Terelj National Park

Immediately after Mongolia attained independence in 1990, there was enthusiasm to declare 100 percent of the country as a national park. However, the goal was set at an achievable 30 percent. But due to economic conditions dictating development of mines, the achievement so far has been of the order of 13.8 percent covering an area of 215,200 square kilometres (83,100 sq mi) spread over 60 protected areas. There are four categories of protected areas, and these are: strictly protected areas (prohibiting hunting, logging and development with no human habitation as the defined areas are very fragile); the national parks, with their historical and educational interest providing for ecotourism in identified areas and with limited access to the local nomads for fishing and grazing; natural and historic monuments with restricted developmental activities; and nature reserves of less important regions providing protection to endangered and rare species of flora and fauna and archeological value with limited access for development within prescribed guidelines. The strictly protected areas are Bogd Khan Uul Biosphere Reserve (established in 1966 covering 67,300 hectares (166,000 acres) including buffer and transition areas), Great Gobi Reserve (established as a reserve in 1975 and as a biosphere reserve in 1990 covering 985,000 hectares (2,430,000 acres)), Uvs Nuur Basin Reserve (established 1997 and covering 810,233.5 hectares (2,002,131 acres)), Dornod Mongol Biosphere Reserve (designated in 2005 and covering 8,429,072 hectares (20,828,690 acres)) and Khustain Nuuru Reserve (established in 2003 covering 50,600 hectares (125,000 acres)). They are all under the UNESCO Man and the Biosphere Programme.

Some of the other protected are:

Strictly protected areas

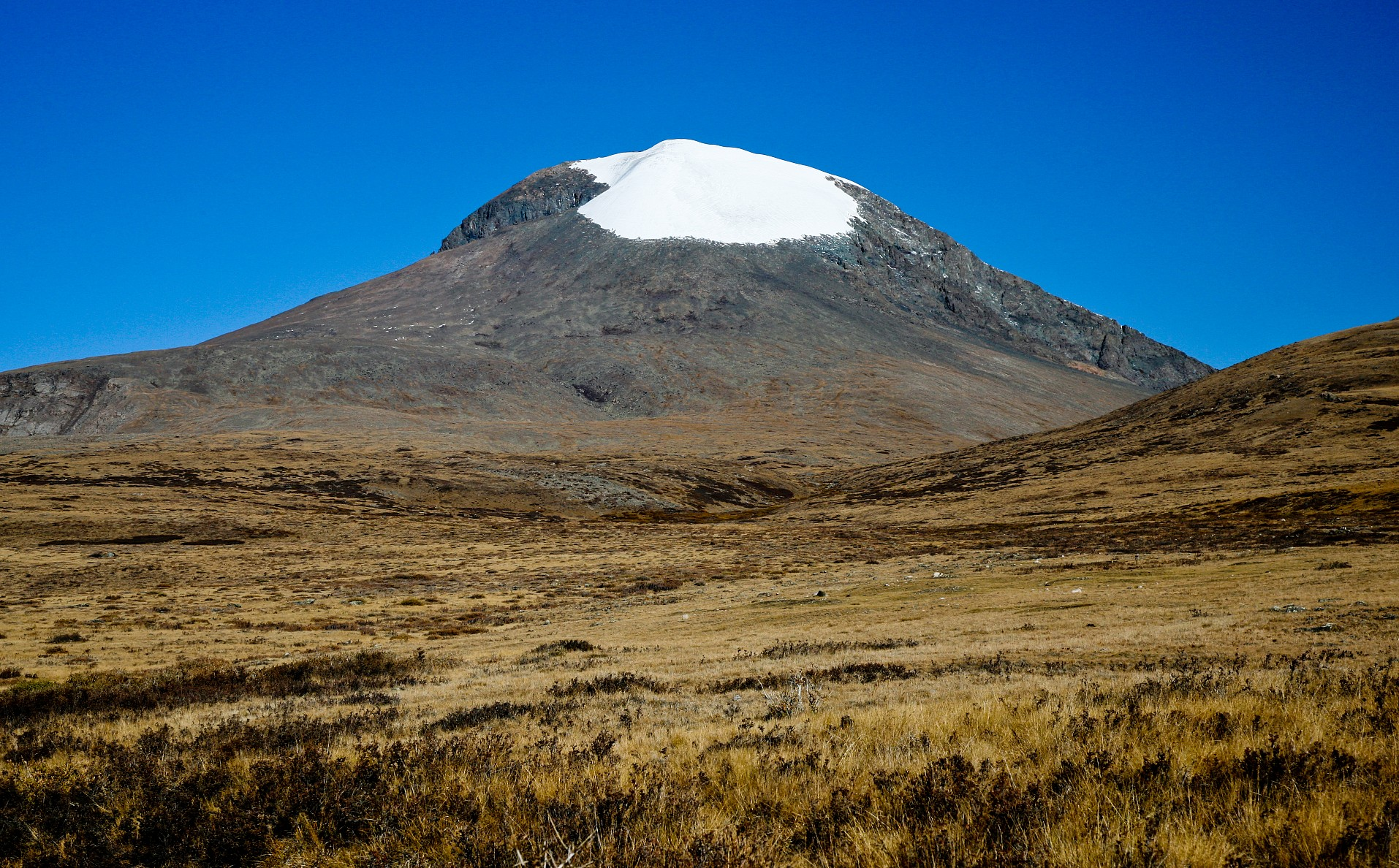
Otgon Tenger Mountain in the strictly protected reserve

- Khasagt Khayrkhan (27,400 hectares (68,000 acres))
- Khukh Serkhiin Nuruu (65,900 hectares (163,000 acres))
- Khan Khentii Uul (1,227,000 hectares (3,030,000 acres))
- Otgon Tenger Reserve (95,500 hectares (236,000 acres))
- Numrug (311,200 hectares (769,000 acres))
- Mongol Daguur Biosphere Reserve (103,000 hectares (250,000 acres))

National parks

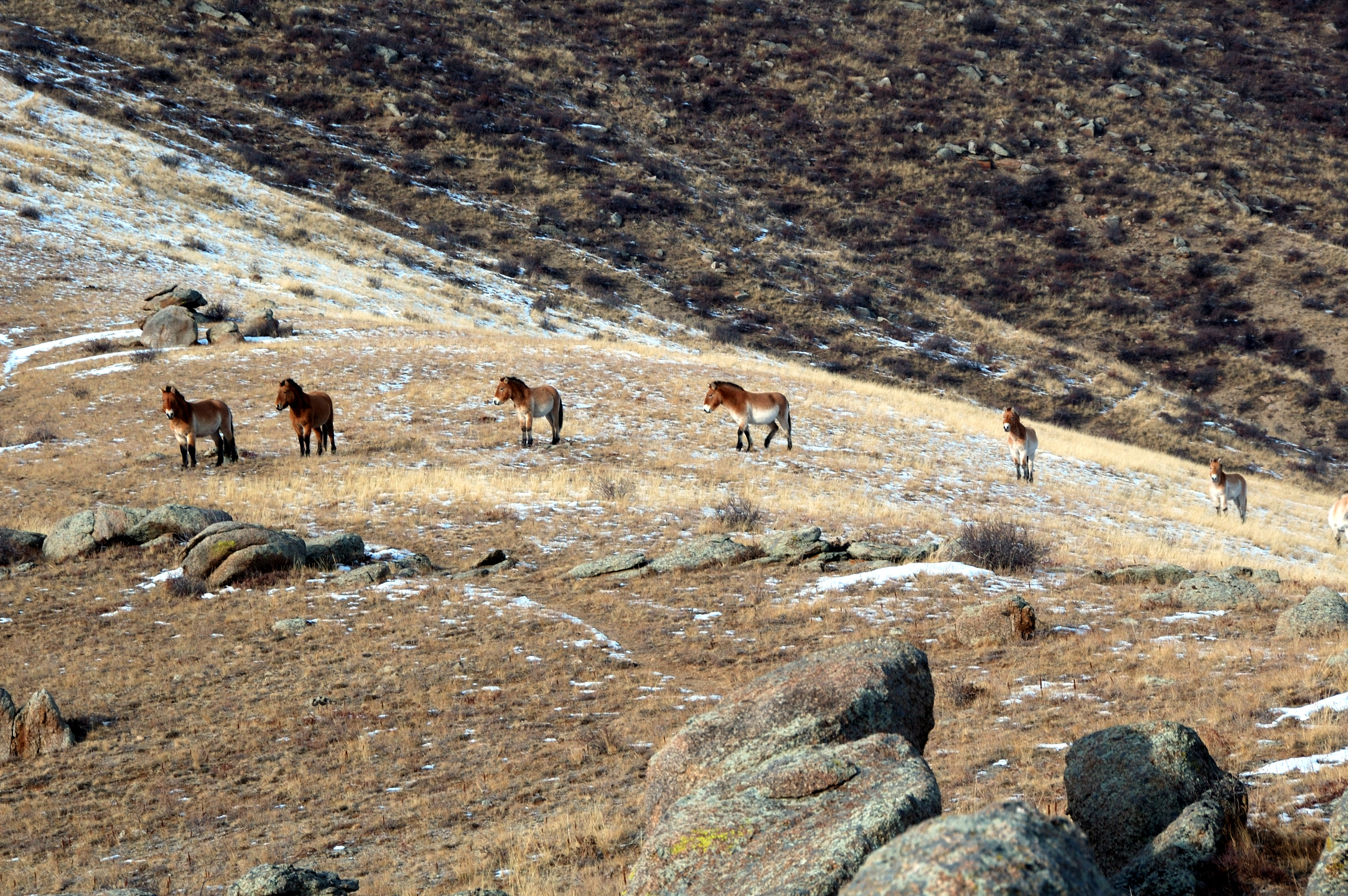
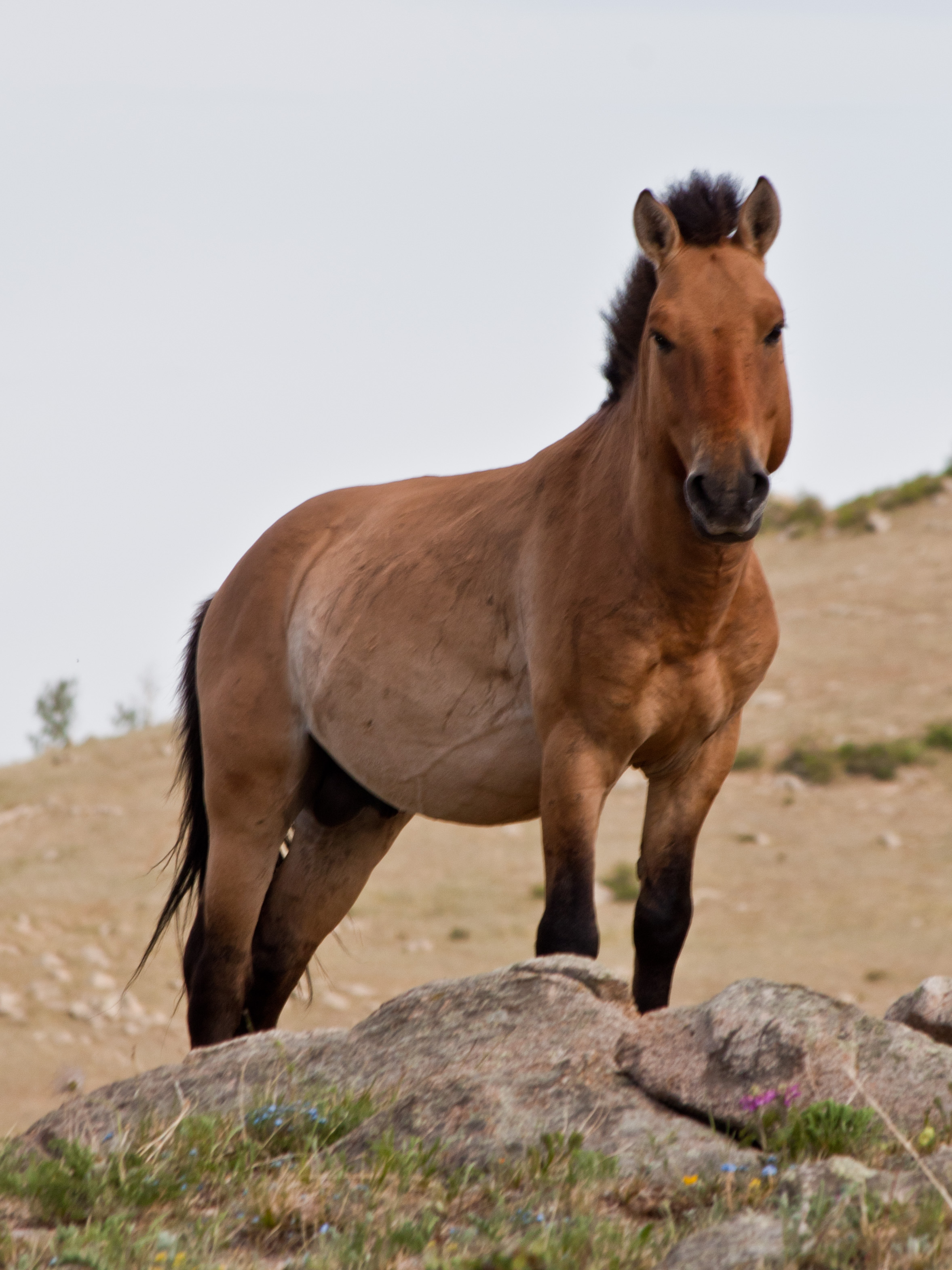
Left: herd of Przewalski horse or takhi in Hustai National Park; right: closeup
- Gobiin Gurvan Saykhan (2,171,737 hectares (5,366,480 acres))
- Khovsgul Nuur (838,100 hectares (2,071,000 acres))
- Khorgo Terkh Zagaan Nuur (77,267 hectares (190,930 acres))
- Gorkhi Terelj (286,400 hectares (708,000 acres))
- Altai Tavan Bogd National Park
- Tsambagarav Uul National Park
- Khustain Nuruu National Park
- Lake Khövsgöl National Park
- Southern Altai Gobi National Park

National reserves

- Ugtam Uul (46,160 hectares (114,100 acres))
- Lkhachinvandad Uul (58,800 hectares (145,000 acres))
- Bulgan Gol (7,700 hectares (19,000 acres))
- Sharga and Mankhan (316,900 hectares (783,000 acres))
- Khustain Nuruu (49,940 hectares (123,400 acres))
- Nagalkhan Uul (3,000 hectares (7,400 acres))
- Batkhan Uul
- Gun-Galuut Nature Reserve

National monuments

- Eej Khairkhan (22,500 hectares (56,000 acres))
- Bulgan Uul (1,800 hectares (4,400 acres))
- Togoo Tulga Uul (1,665 hectares (4,110 acres))
- Naiman Nuur (11,500 hectares (28,000 acres))
- Ganga Nuur (32,860 hectares (81,200 acres))

== Flora ==
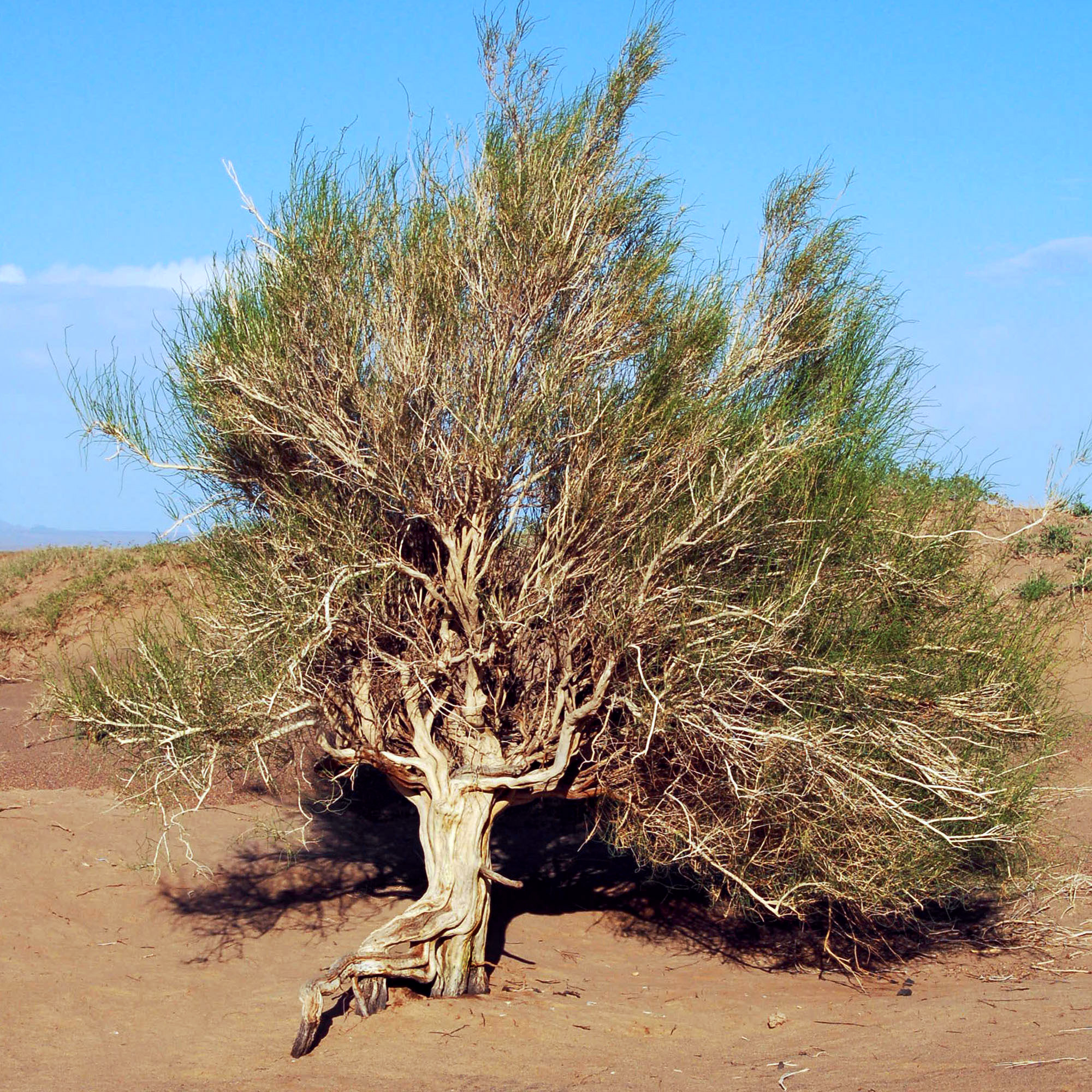
Saxaul (Haloxylon ammodendron) in Ömnögovi Province,

The flora in the wildlife area of Mongolia is of pasture lands in three-fourths of the country, which is the main source of feed for the large quantity of livestock. Forests and barren deserts cover the remaining area in the country. There are four vegetation zones. Coniferous forest form the taiga region of the northern areas with alpine noted at higher zones. In the mountain forest-steppe zone vegetation is dense on the northern slopes; Siberian larches (grows up to 45 metres (148 ft) height), Siberian cedars, interspersed with spruces, pines (Siberian and Scotch pines), and firs along with deciduous vegetation of white and brown birches, aspens, and poplars are noted to dominate the area. The inter-montane basins, wide river valleys and the southern slopes of the mountains have steppe vegetation. Pastureland have a cover of feather grass, couch grass, wormwood, and several species fodder plants. In the semi desert and Gobi Desert areas, the vegetation is scanty but just adequate for the camels, sheep and goat populations to survive. Saxaul is a xerophytic (drought-tolerant) species which provides firewood. Elms and poplars are also found near springs and underground water resources. Saxaul shrubs dominate the deserts and they anchor the sand dunes and prevent erosion. It grows to height of 4 m, over a period of 100 years, with very dense wood that sinks in water. Rhododendrons bloom with red, yellow and white flowers and edelweiss is also reported. More than 200 plant species are reported to be under threat. In 2021, the One Billion Trees program was launched with the goal of planting about a billion native trees and shrubs across the country by 2030. Since the launch of the national "1 Billion Trees" movement, 117 million trees have been planted and grown across the country by 2025.

== Fauna ==
There are 139 mammal species found in Mongolia, and 448 species of birds.

=== Mammals ===
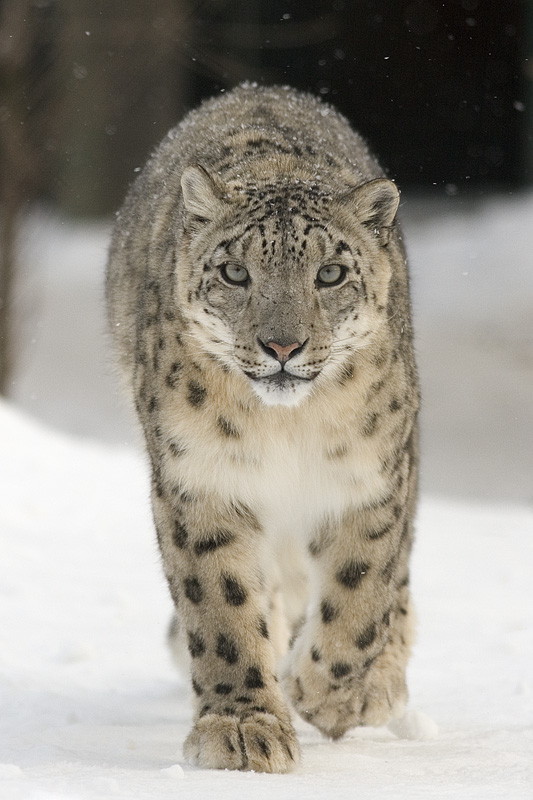
A snow leopard (Uncia uncia)

Mongolia has a number of large mammals, including Mongolian wolves (Canis lupus chanco) and Siberian ibex (Capra sibirica), as well as more endangered species such as the wild Bactrian camel (Camelus ferus), the snow leopard (Uncia uncia), the Gobi bear (rarest and unique to the desert region), the Przewalski's horse (both wild and domestic types of horses) and the onager (the largest numbers in the world are found in the Gobi desert).

The saiga antelope (Saiga tatarica mongolica), once a common species, has been reduced by pressures including hunting, livestock grazing, and high Chinese medicinal value, with the Mongolian subspecies reaching a critically endangered level, with fewer than 5,000 individuals left in the wild. Przewalski's horse, in particular, had almost become extinct (not seen for more than three decades) and was therefore reintroduced from captive sources. Other species of mammals reported include: argali (Ovis ammon) (in the rocky mountains of the Gobi desert), Eurasian wolf (Canis lupus lupus), Siberian musk deer (Moschus moschiferus), Pallas's cat (Otocolobus manul), goitered gazelle (Gazelle subgutturosa), stone marten (Martes foina), and wild cats in the Altai ecoregion; wild boar (Sus scrofa nigipes), Altai wapiti (Cervus canadensis sibiricus), roe deer in the forest areas and muskrat, red fox, corsac fox, and sable in the forest and steppe margin areas.

Under the World Wildlife Fund-Mongolia conservation programme (a four-year project), snow leopards, Altai argali sheep, saiga antelope and gazelle of eastern Mongolia are receiving special attention. The Zoological Society of London has taken interest in conservation of the Bactrian camel, long-eared jerboa (Euchoreutes naso), Mongolian gerbil (Meriones unguiculatus) and saiga antelope. Mongolia is also successfully implementing a program to protect the Gobi bear (mazaalai) with support from China

=== Birds ===
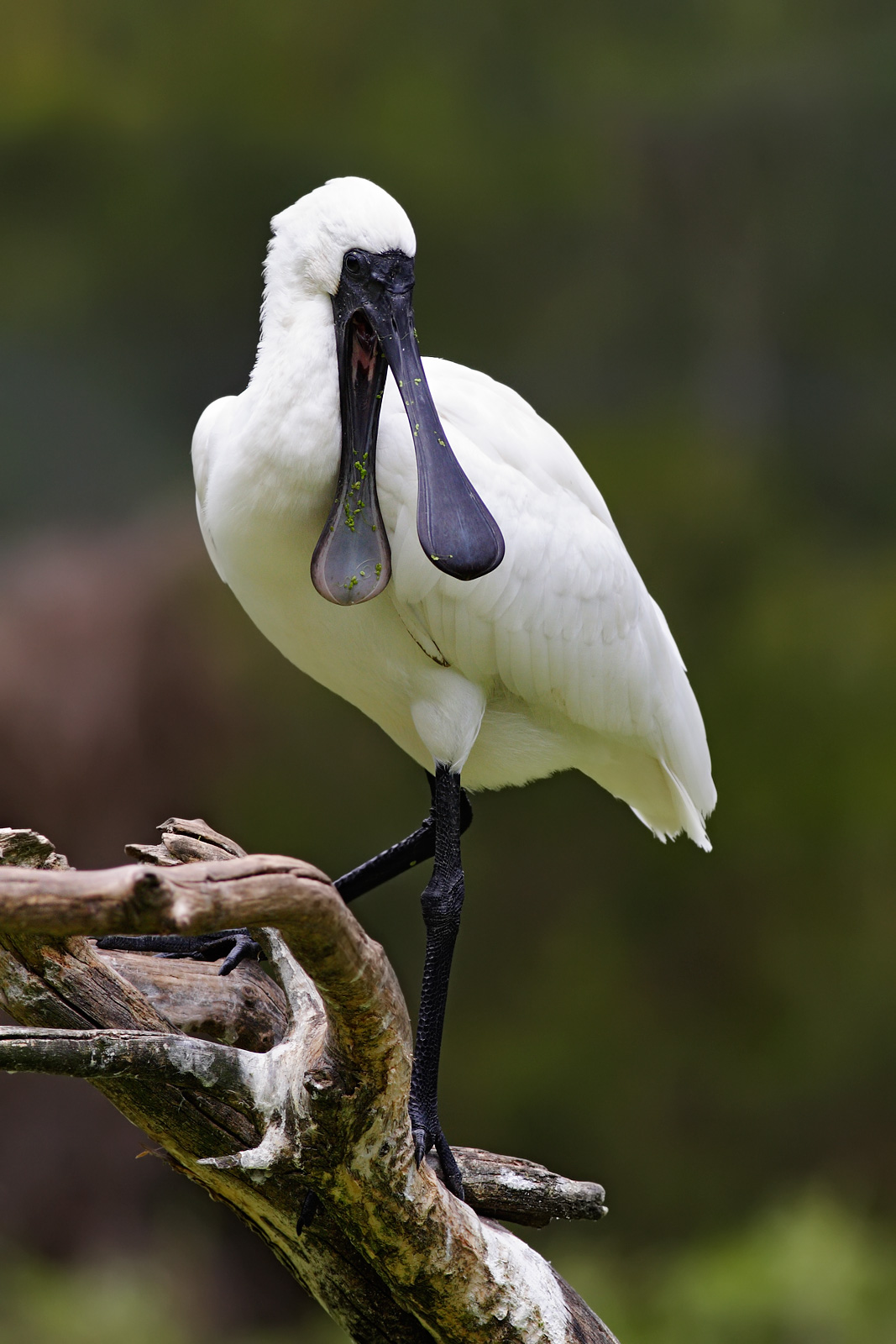
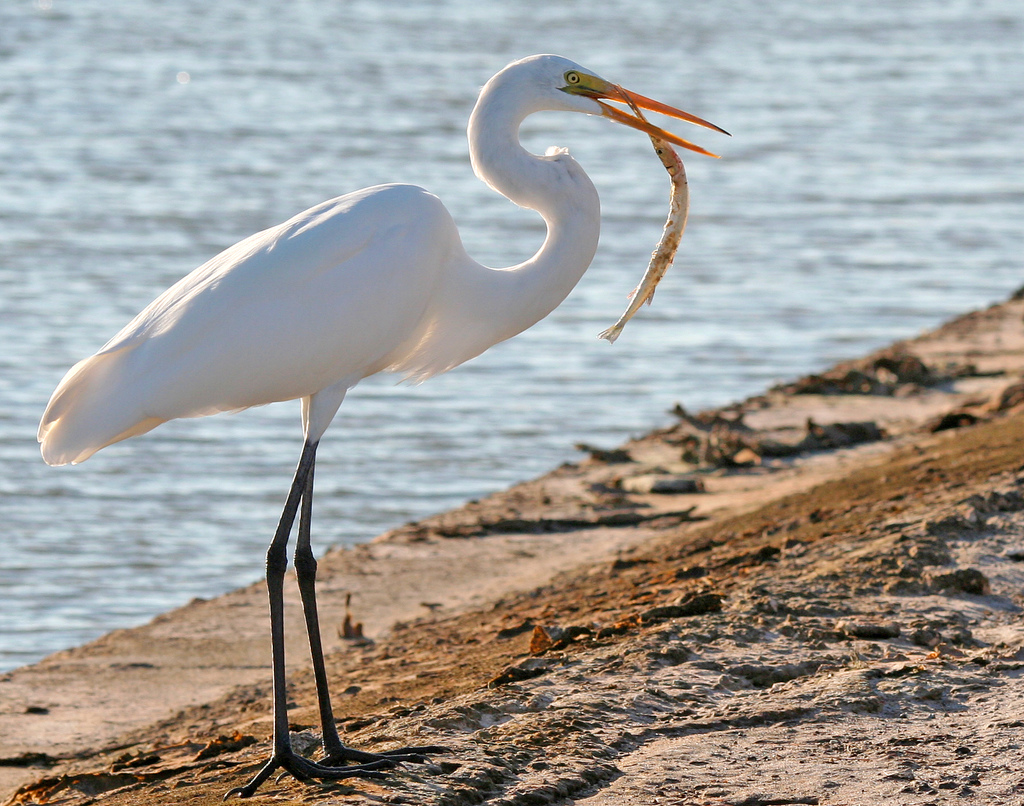
Left: A spoonbill; right: a great white egret

The bird species in Mongolia include several that are very large. Six species of cranes present in Mongolia account for half the numbers in the world. There are 22 endangered species of birds including hawks, falcons, buzzards, cranes and owls. Though cranes are not hunted for superstitious reasons, they are still threatened due to habitat degradation and only 5,000 breeding pairs are reported, mostly in Dornod's Mongol Daguur Biosphere Reserve. In eastern Mongolia, a critically endangered species of crane is the white naped crane (Tsen togoru). Overall there are 469 species of birds, including domesticated species linked to wild ancestral species. Of these, 330 are migratory and 119 are seen throughout the year. Species identified include: golden eagle (Aquila chrysaetos), lammergeyer (Gypaetus barbatus), spoonbills (Platalea leucorodia), Dalmatian pelican (Pelecanus crispus), great white egrets (Egretta alba), whooper swans (Cygnus cygnus), great black-headed gulls (Larus ichthyaetus), black storks (Ciconia nigra), swan goose (Anser cygnoides) and Altai snowcock (Tetraogallus altaicus).

=== Aquatic life ===
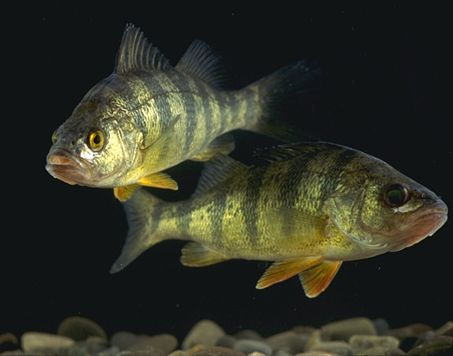
Yellow perch

The rivers and lakes of Mongolia are reported to have 76 species of fish, including trout, grayling (khadran; Arctic grayling, Mongolian grayling,), roach, lenok (zebge), Siberian sturgeon (khilem, pike (tsurkhai), perch (algana), Altai osman (endemic to the rivers of Mongolia) and the taimen (a huge Siberian salmon relative, growing up to 1.5 m in length and 50 kg in weight).

== Threats and conservation ==
In a country where Russia was supporting the economy with grants until it became independent in 1990, the situation drastically changed after independence. The country's revenue then depended more from the wildlife resources and its landscape, which were subject to serious exploitation necessitating a policy change towards ecotourism to generate revenue to preserve the remaining biodiversity of the country. Other than official action to raise resources of the state, other major threats faced are illegal hunting (for musk deer, elk, boars, squirrels and marmot for illegal trade), grazing of pasture livestock and related needs of water resources (due to large increase in livestock population since 1990), climate change, fires in steppe and forests (resulting in death of many animal species) and severe cold and drought.

For conservation of the rich biodiversity of the country, the government of Mongolia has established national parks and nature reserves supplemented with laws on hunting regulations and other conservation measures, and also on hunting and fishing for sport and for commercial purposes.
