= 13th Century Complex =

Amusement park in Erdene, Töv, Mongolia

13th Century Complex 13-р зуун цогцолбор
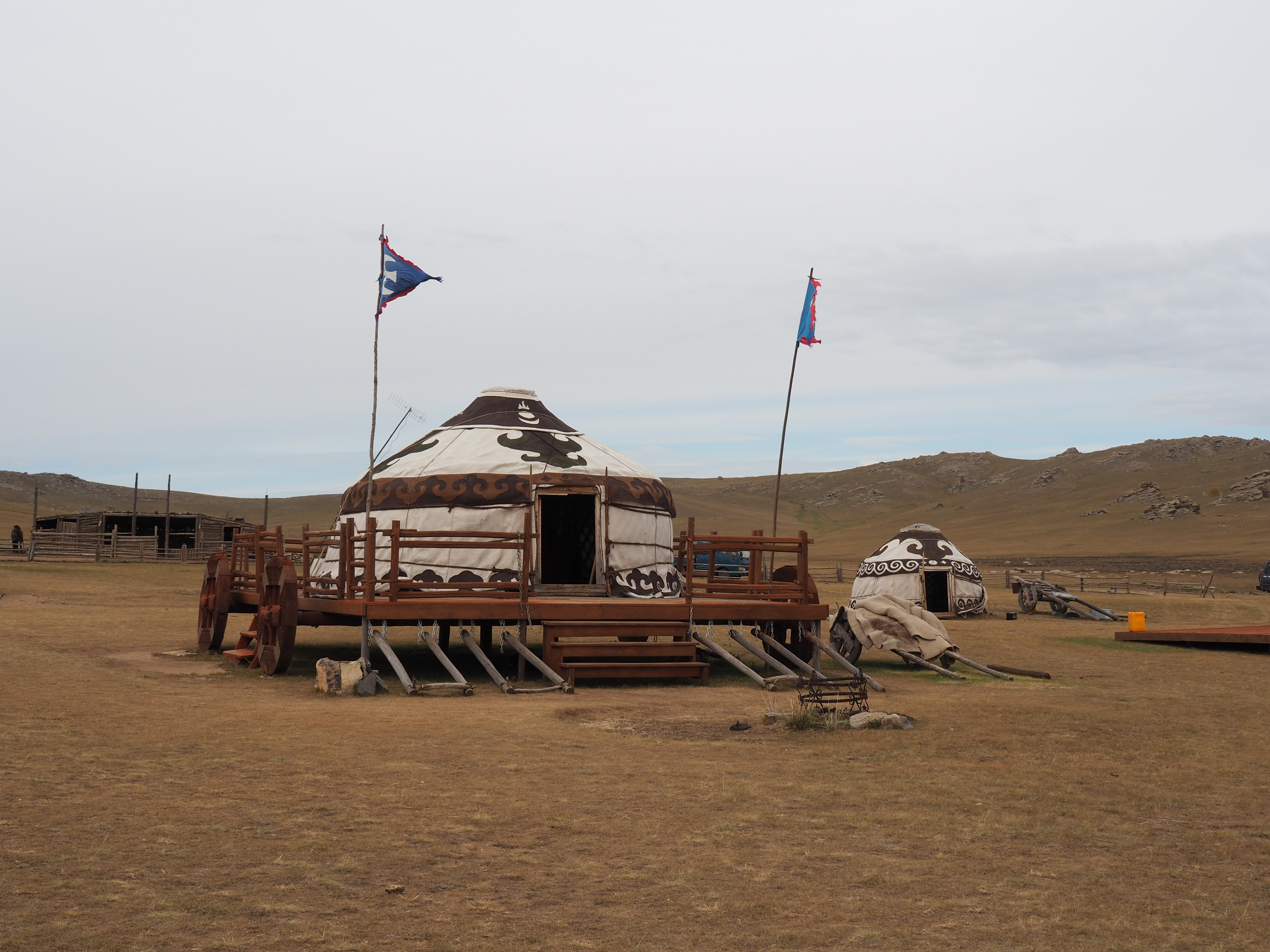
- Interactive map of 13th Century Complex; 13-р зуун цогцолбор
- Location: Erdene, Töv, Mongolia
- Coordinates: 47°34′24.1″N 107°47′40.3″E
- Status: Operating
- Area: 88 ha (220 acres)

The 13th Century Complex (Mongolian: 13-р зуун цогцолбор) is an amusement park in Erdene, Töv Province, Mongolia.

== Architecture ==
The park gives the environment of working and living in the 13th century of Mongolia. The park covers an area of 88 hectares. The park is divided into several sections, which are relay-station camp, craftsmen camp, educational camp, herder's camp, shaman's camp and king's palace.

== See also ==
- Tourism in Mongolia
