= Yolyn Am =

Canyon in Mongolia

Coordinates: 43.4931°N 104.0838°E

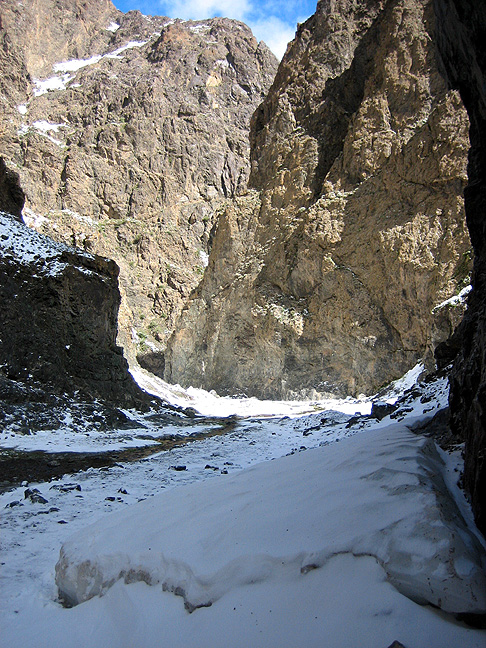
Remnants of the Yolyn Am ice field, September 2006

Yolyn Am (Mongolian: Ёлын Ам, Lammergeier Valley) is a deep and narrow gorge in the Gurvan Saikhan Mountains of southern Mongolia. The valley is named after the Lammergeier, which is called Yol in Mongolian. The Lammergeier is an Old World vulture, hence the name is often translated to Valley of the Vultures or Valley of the Eagles.

The valley is located within Gobi Gurvansaikhan National Park.

Yolyn Am is found in the Zuun Saikhanii Nuruu (the Eastern Beauty) subrange of the Gurvan Saikhan Mountains. The area, as part of the Gobi Desert, sees little precipitation. However, Yolyn Am is notable for a deep ice field. The ice field reaches several meters thick by the end of winter, and is several kilometers long. In past years it remained year round, but the modern ice field tends to disappear by September.

== Wildlife ==
Apart from the lammergeir, both the Himalayan and Cinereous vulture can be found in the gorge. Other birds that live in the gorge are the Altai snowcock, wallcreeper and the Mongolian finch. Mammals that live in the valley include the Argali, Siberian ibex and snow leopard. Numerous pika can also be found in the valley, especially near the ice field area.
