= Erdene, Töv =

Coordinates: 47°43′09″N 107°47′45″E

Erdene District Эрдэнэ сум ᠡᠷᠳᠡᠨᠢᠰᠤᠮᠤ
- District
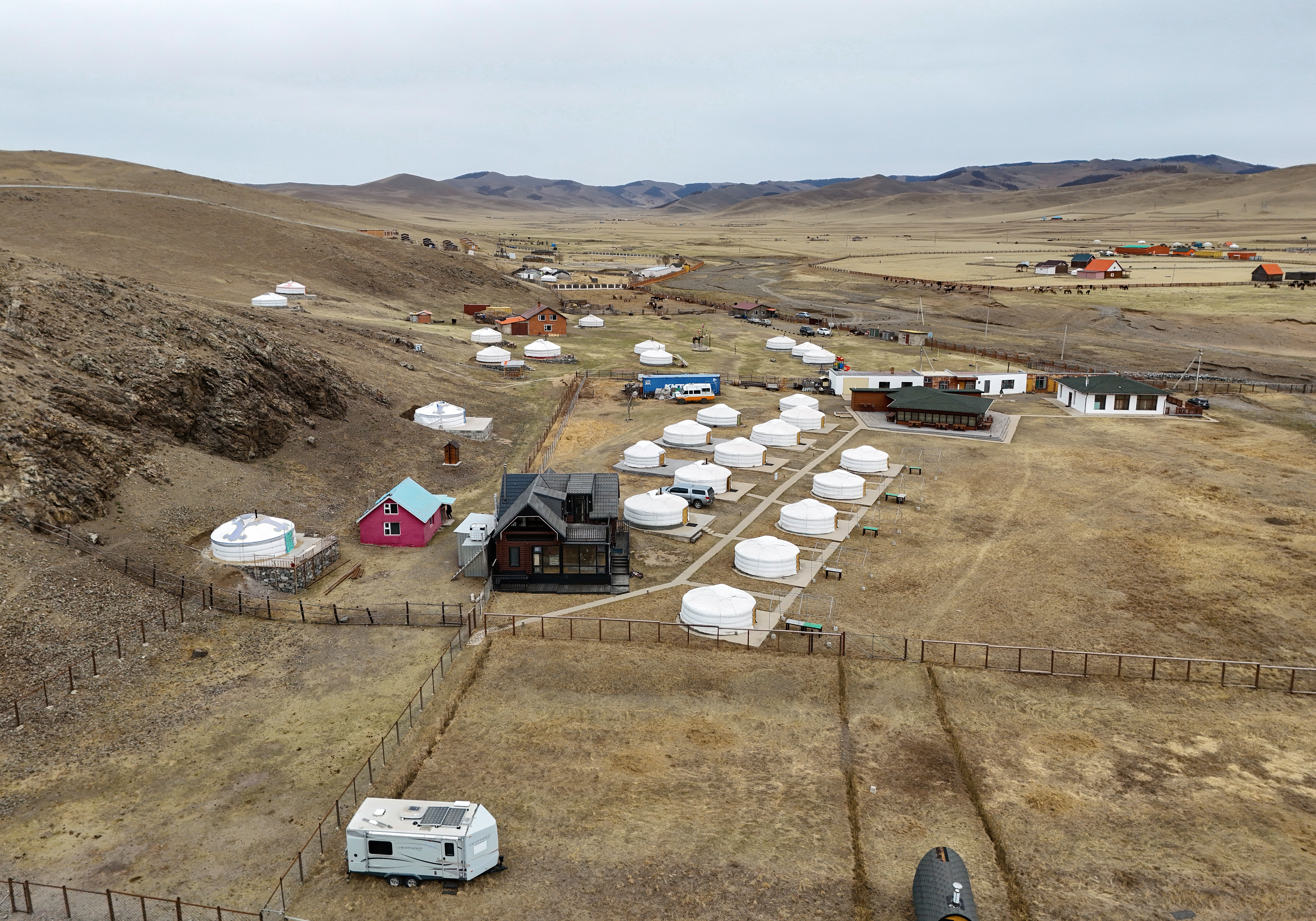
- Horse camp

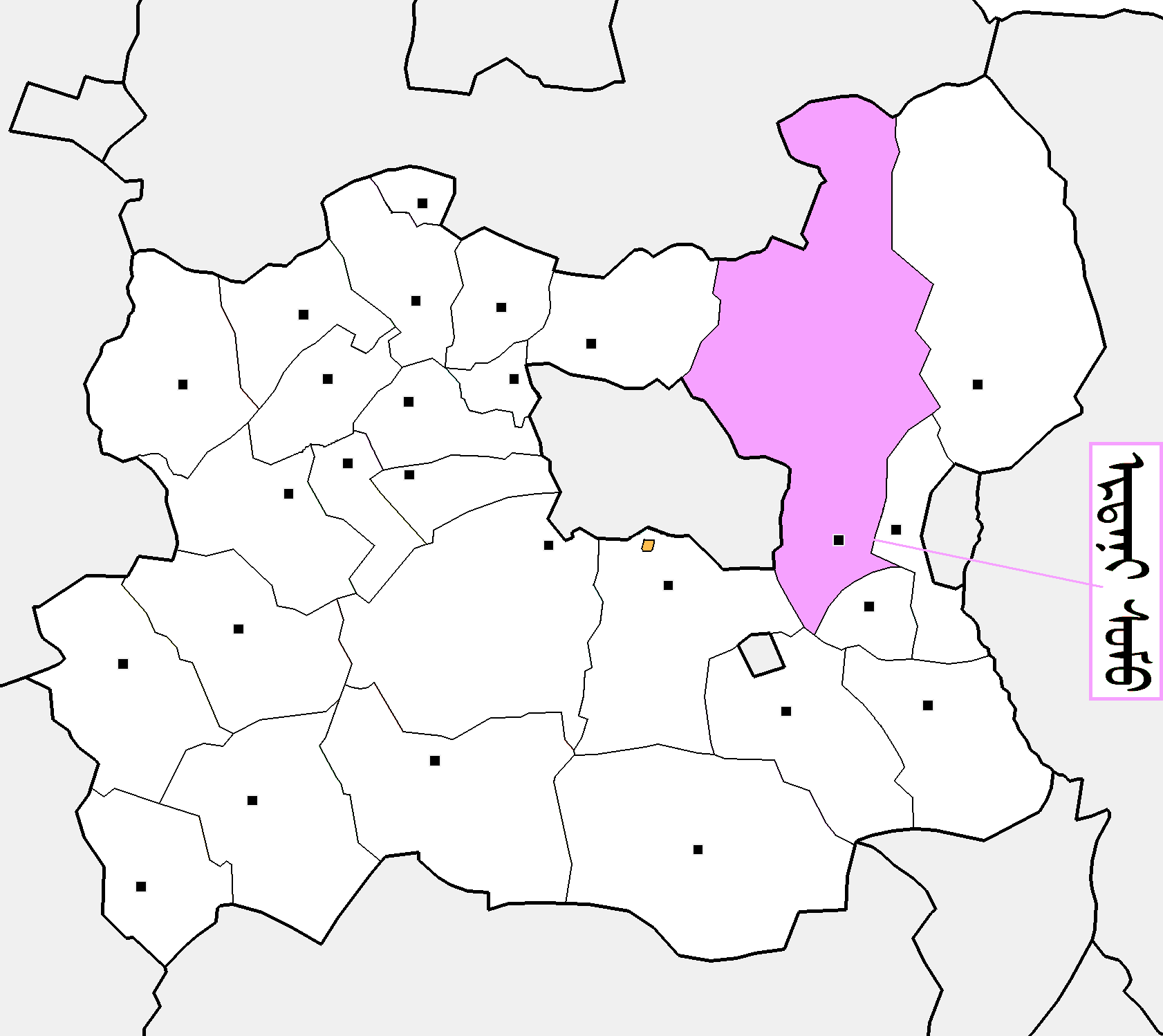
- Country: Mongolia
- Province: Töv Province

Population
  - Total: 3,607
- Time zone: UTC+8 (UTC + 8)

Erdene (/ˈɜːrdɛn/; Mongolian: Эрдэнэ [írtɪn]) is a sum of Töv Province in Mongolia. Sum center former location was 47 47 35 N 107 53 00 E. The Janchivlin and Ar Janchivlin resorts on mineral springs are 20 km SW from sum center.

== Geography ==
Erdene has a total area of 8,039 km^{2}.

== Administrative divisions ==
The district is divided into five bags, which are:

- Bayantuul
- Chuluut
- Khushinga
- Tamgan
- Uguumur

== Tourist attractions ==
- 13th Century Complex
