= Agtana Khureet Festival =

Annual festival in Sükhbaatar, Mongolia

Agtana Khureet Festival Агтана Хүрээт Хүлэгч Эрсийн Наадам
- Begins: 2018
- Location: Sükhbaatar
- Country: Mongolia
- Participants: 3,000 (2020)
- Organiser: Citizen's Representative Khural of Sukhbaatar Province

The Agtana Khureet Festival (Mongolian: Агтана Хүрээт Хүлэгч Эрсийн Наадам) is an annual festival in Sükhbaatar Province, Mongolia to promote the horse culture of the country.

== History ==
The festival started in 2018.

== Management ==
The event is organized by the Citizen's Representative Khural of Sukhbaatar Province.

== Participants ==
Around 3,000 people participated in the festival in 2020.

== See also ==
- Mongolian horse
