= Ice field =

Large area of interconnected glaciers

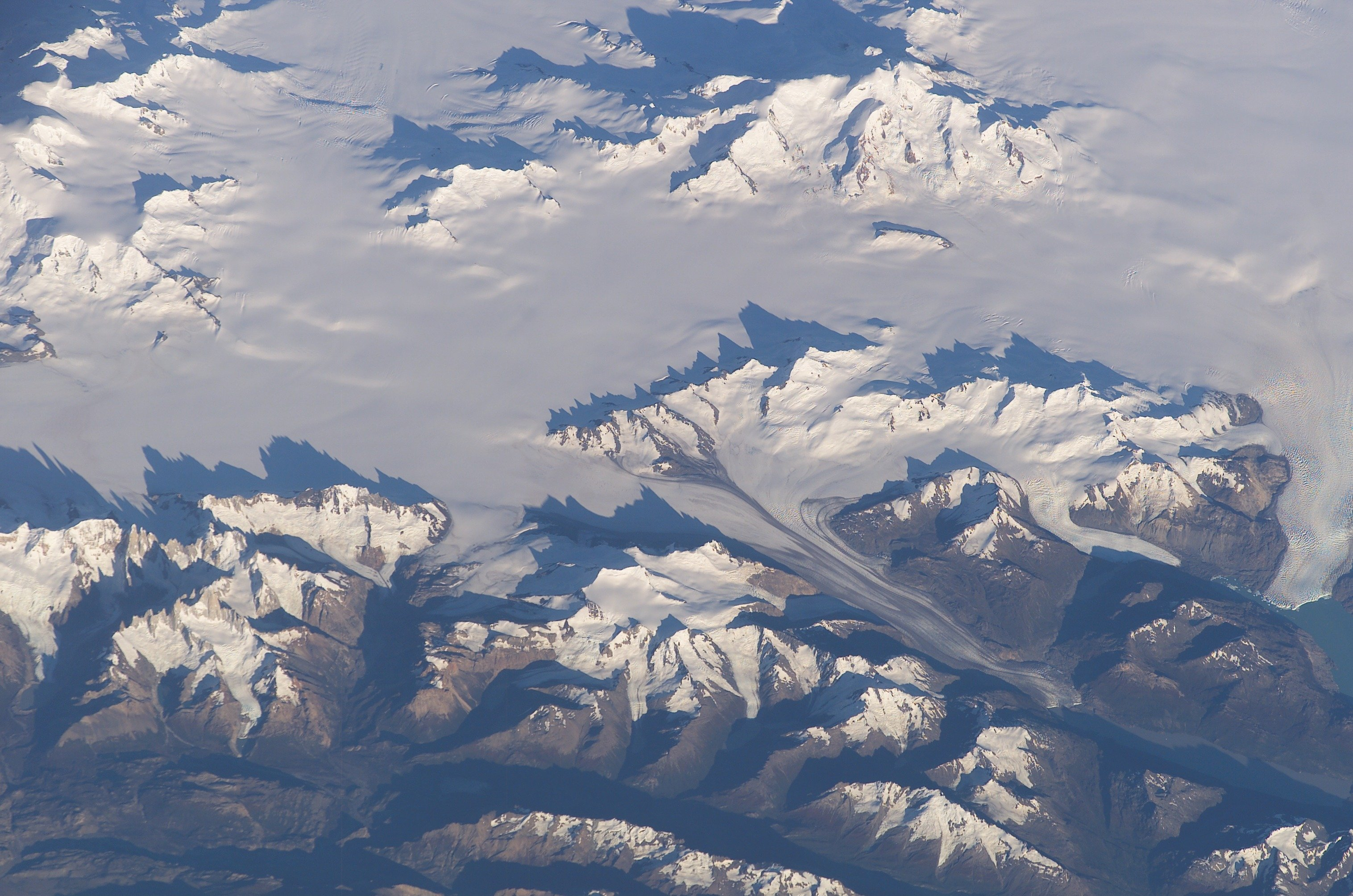
The Southern Patagonian Ice Field between Chile and Argentina.

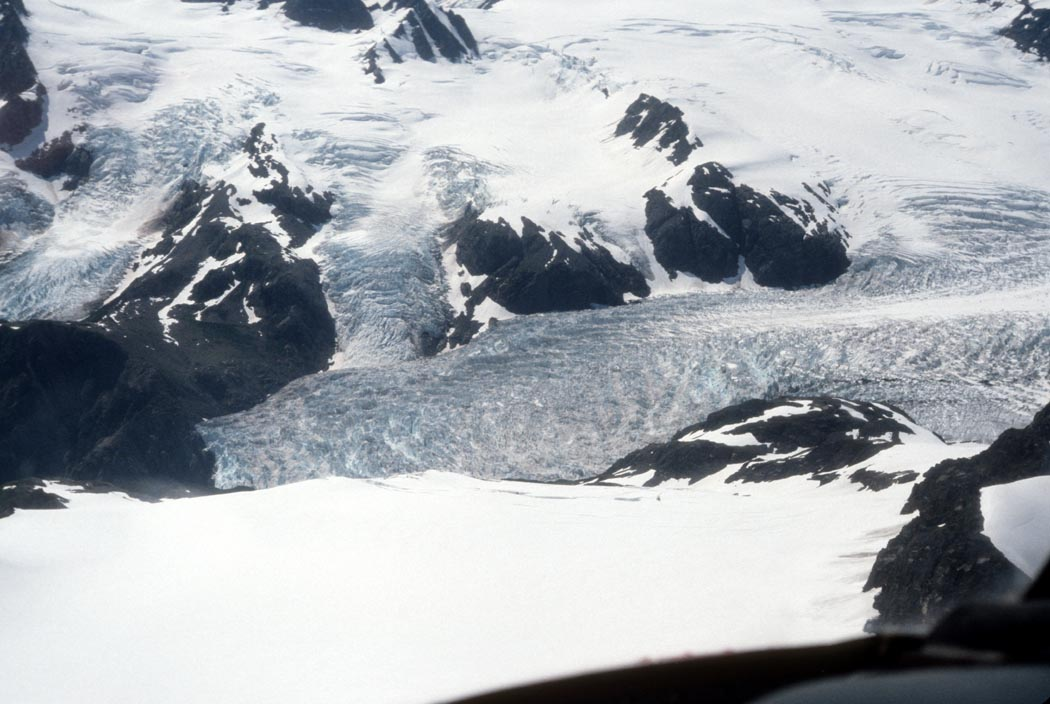
The Harding Icefield on the Kenai Peninsula in Alaska, United States.

An ice field (also spelled icefield) is a mass of interconnected valley glaciers (also called mountain glaciers or alpine glaciers) on a mountain mass with protruding rock ridges or summits. They are often found in the colder climates and higher altitudes of the world where there is sufficient precipitation for them to form. The higher peaks of the underlying mountain rock that protrude through the icefields are known as nunataks. Ice fields are larger than alpine glaciers, but smaller than ice caps and ice sheets. The topography of ice fields is determined by the shape of the surrounding landforms, while ice caps have their own forms overriding underlying shapes.

== Formation ==
Ice fields are formed by a large accumulation of snow which, through years of compression and freezing, turns into ice. Because of the susceptibility of ice to gravity, ice fields usually form over large areas that are basins or atop plateaus, thus allowing a continuum of ice to form over the landscape uninterrupted by glacial channels. Glaciers often form on the edges of ice fields, serving as gravity-propelled drains off the ice field which is in turn replenished by snowfall.

While an ice cap is not constrained by topography, an ice field is. An ice field is also distinguishable from an ice cap because it does not have a dome-like form.

== Ice fields of the world ==
=== Asia ===
There are several ice fields in the Himalayas and Altay Mountains (the border range between the Central Asian Republics and China). One unexpected ice field is located in Yolyn Am, a mountain valley located in the northern end of the Gobi Desert.

=== Oceania ===
There are no ice fields in Australia.

New Zealand has

- Garden of Eden Ice Plateau
- Garden of Allah ice field
- Olivine Ice Plateau

=== Europe ===
The only large ice fields in mainland Europe are in Norway (e.g., Dovre and Jotunheimen). There are several dozen small ice fields in the Alps and tiny remnants of permanent ice in Sweden, the Apennines, the Pyrenees and the Balkans. Since the disappearance of the last remaining ice field in Andalucía, with the disappearance of the Corral del Veleta glacier in 1913, the southernmost surviving permanent ice field in continental Europe is Snezhnika in Bulgaria.

Beyond the mainland of continental Europe, there are substantial ice fields in Iceland, Svalbard and Franz-Josef Land and smaller surviving ice fields on Jan Mayen and Novaya Zemlya.

=== North America ===
One of the more celebrated North American ice fields is the Columbia Icefield located in the Rocky Mountains between Jasper and Banff, Alberta. Easy access by road contributes to the status of this ice field as one of the most visited in North America, although it is actually a comparatively small ice field within the huge and largely ice-free American Cordillera.

Many particularly expansive ice fields lie in the Coast Mountains, Alaska Range, and Chugach Mountains of Alaska, British Columbia, and the Yukon Territory. The 6,500 km^{2} Stikine Icecap (located between the Stikine and Taku Rivers) and the 2,500 km^{2} Juneau Icefield (located between Lynn Canal and the Taku River) both straddle the British Columbian-Alaskan border. Farther north, the Kluane Icecap — which feeds the immense Malaspina and Hubbard Glaciers as well as the Bagley Icefield — sits upon the British Columbia-Yukon Territory-Alaska border and surrounds most of the Saint Elias Mountains as well as both Mount Saint Elias and Mount Logan; it extends as far west as the Copper River.

There are also large ice fields located in the Kenai Peninsula-Chugach Mountains area, such as the Sargent Icefield and the Harding Icefield. Throughout the Alaska Range there also large icefields (including one surrounding Denali) which are mostly unnamed.

=== South America ===
In South America there are three main ice fields.

The main ice field, known as Campo de Hielo Sur (Southern Patagonian Ice Field) is located at the Southern Patagonic Andes, and it is shared between Chile and Argentina. It is the world's second largest contiguous extrapolar ice field. At about 16,800 square kilometers, it is second only to southeastern Alaska's approximately 25,000 square kilometer Kluane / Wrangell–St. Elias / Glacier Bay / Tatshenshini-Alsek Ice Field. Another notable icefield is Campo de Hielo Norte (Northern Patagonian Ice Field), which is located entirely in Chile; and a third smaller icefield, known as the Ice Fields of the Darwin Range, which is located on the western (Chilean) portion of Tierra del Fuego proper.

== See also ==
- List of glaciers and icefields
- Nunatak
