= Gobi Gurvansaikhan National Park =

National park in Ömnögovi, Mongolia

- (Mongolian); Говь Гурвансайхан байгалийн цогцолборт газар ᠭᠣᠪᠢ ᠭᠤᠷᠪᠠᠨ ᠰᠠᠶᠢᠬᠠᠨ ᠪᠠᠶᠢᠭᠠᠯᠢ ᠶᠢᠨ ᠴᠣᠭᠴᠠᠯᠠᠪᠤᠷᠢᠲᠤ ᠭᠠᠵᠠᠷ
- IUCN category II (national park)
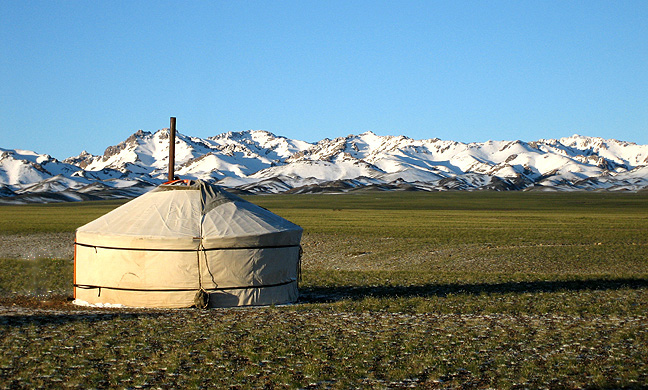
- A ger with the Gurvan Saikhan Mountains behind

- Location within Mongolia
- Location: Ömnögovi, Mongolia
- Nearest city: Dalanzadgad
- Coordinates: 43°48′10″N 101°35′23″E
- Area: 2,700,000 hectares (6,671,845 acres; 27,000 km^{2}; 10,425 sq mi)
- Established: 1993
- Governing body: Ministry of Environment and Green Development of Mongolia

Gobi Gurvansaikhan National Park (Mongolian: Говь Гурвансайхан байгалийн цогцолборт газар, ᠭᠣᠪᠢ ᠭᠤᠷᠪᠠᠨ ᠰᠠᠶᠢᠬᠠᠨ ᠪᠠᠶᠢᠭᠠᠯᠢ ᠶᠢᠨ ᠴᠣᠭᠴᠠᠯᠠᠪᠤᠷᠢᠲᠤ ᠭᠠᠵᠠᠷ, Gobi three beauties nature complex) is a national park in southern Mongolia. The park was established in 1993, and expanded to its current size in 2000. The park, at nearly 27,000 square kilometers, is the largest national park in Mongolia, stretching 380 km from east to west and 80 km from north to south.

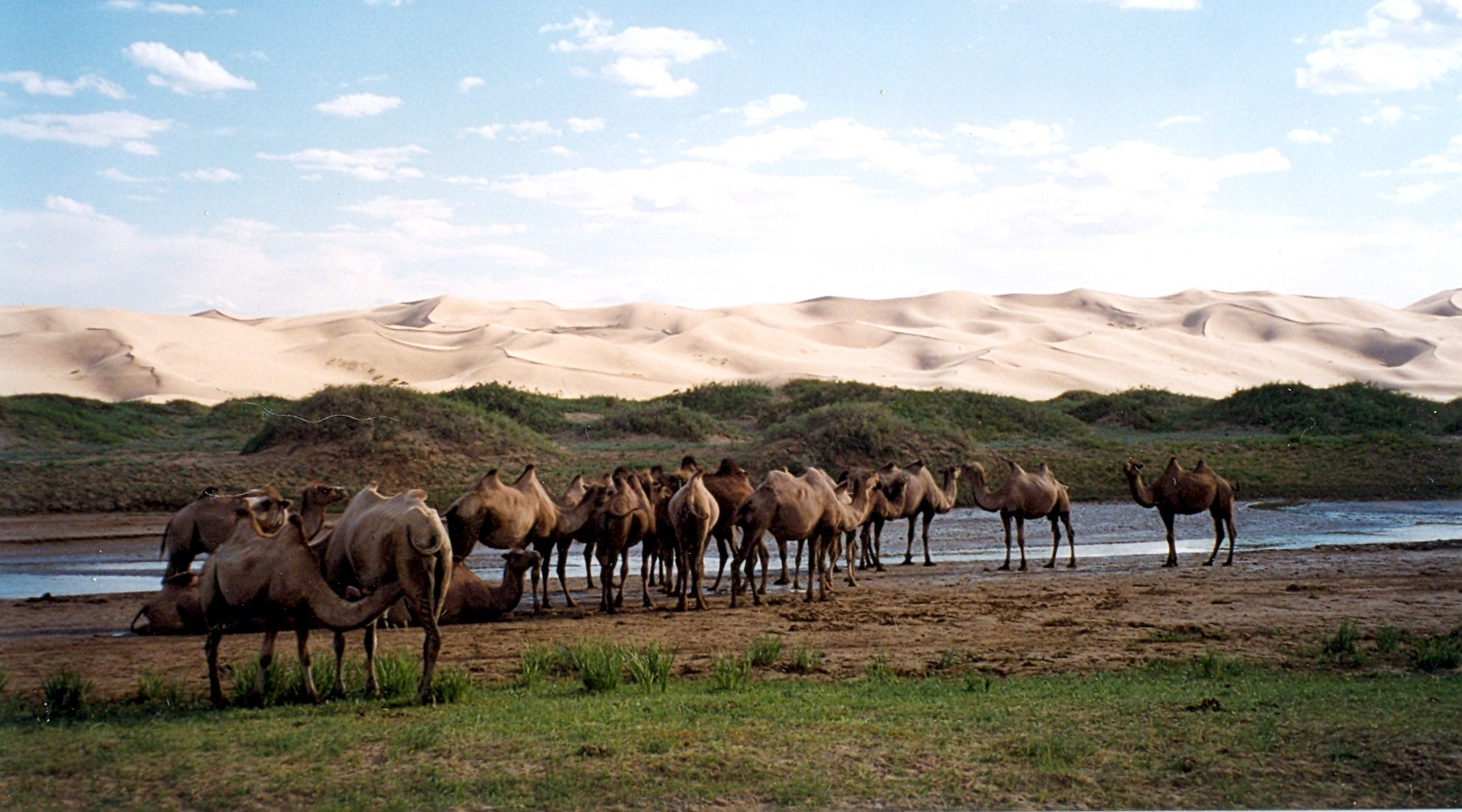
Bactrian camels by the sand dunes of Khongoryn Els.

The park is named for the Gurvan Saikhan Mountains, which translates to the Three Beauties. The name is derived from three subranges, the East, Middle and West Beauty. The range forms the eastern half of the park.

The park lies on the northern edge of the Gobi Desert. The higher elevations contain areas of steppe, and reach elevations of up to 2,600 meters. A number of rare plants and animals are found in the park, including the elusive snow leopard and the Gobi camel. Areas of sand dunes are found, most famously the Khongoryn Els - the Singing Sands. Another major tourist destination is Yolyn Am, which is connected with Dalanzadgad by paved road and a mountain valley that contains a large ice field through most of the year.

The park is usually accessed via the town of Dalanzadgad, which has airport service to Ulaanbaatar.

== Wildlife ==
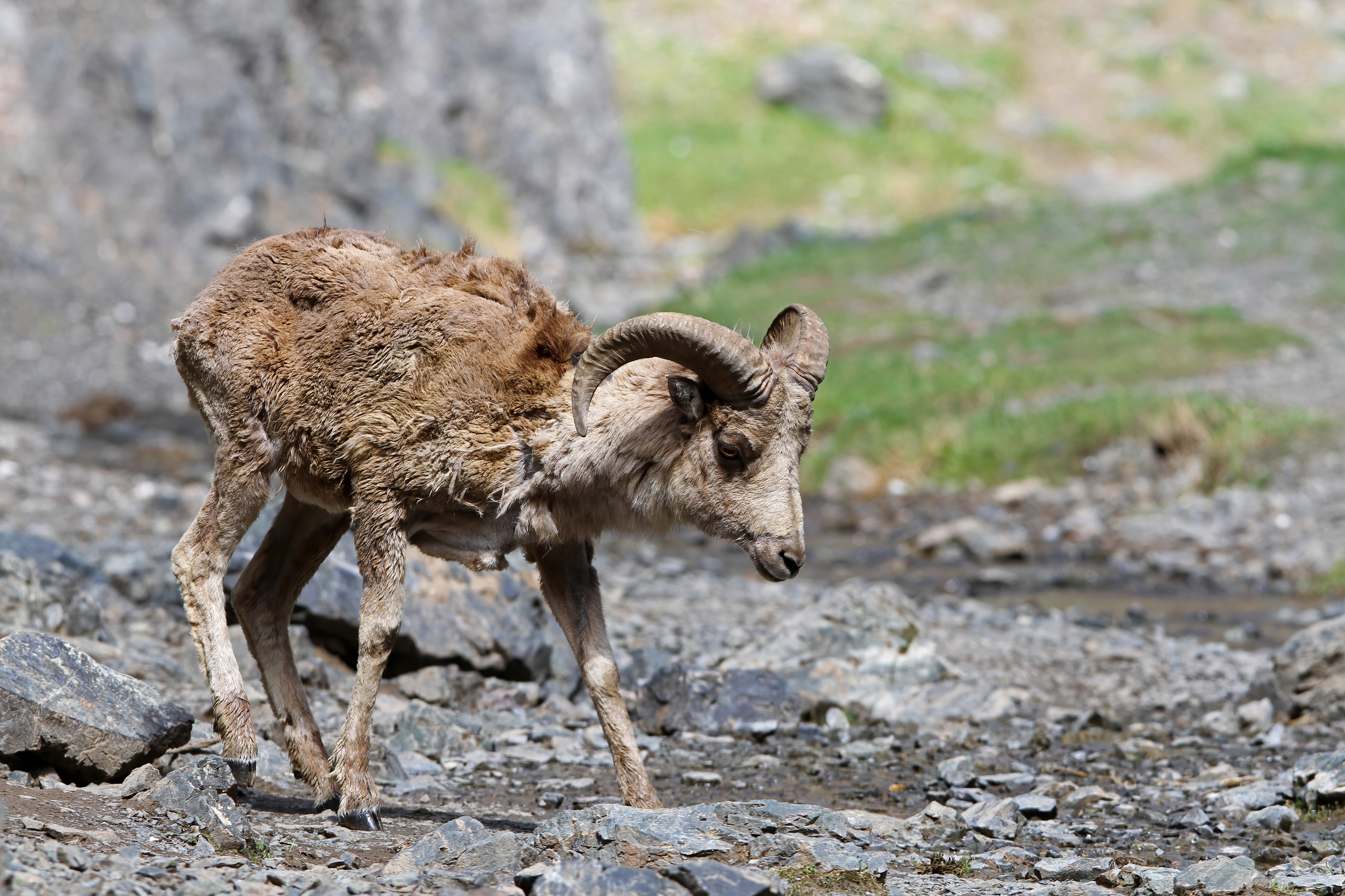
Argali in the National Park

The park is a haven for some endangered species like the argali sheep, snow leopard and Siberian ibex. The eponymous mountains of the park are inhabited by the magnificent lammergeier, or bearded vulture. The eastern range of the park supports the endangered Saker Falcon and has been designated an Important Bird Area by BirdLife International.

== See also ==
- List of national parks of Mongolia

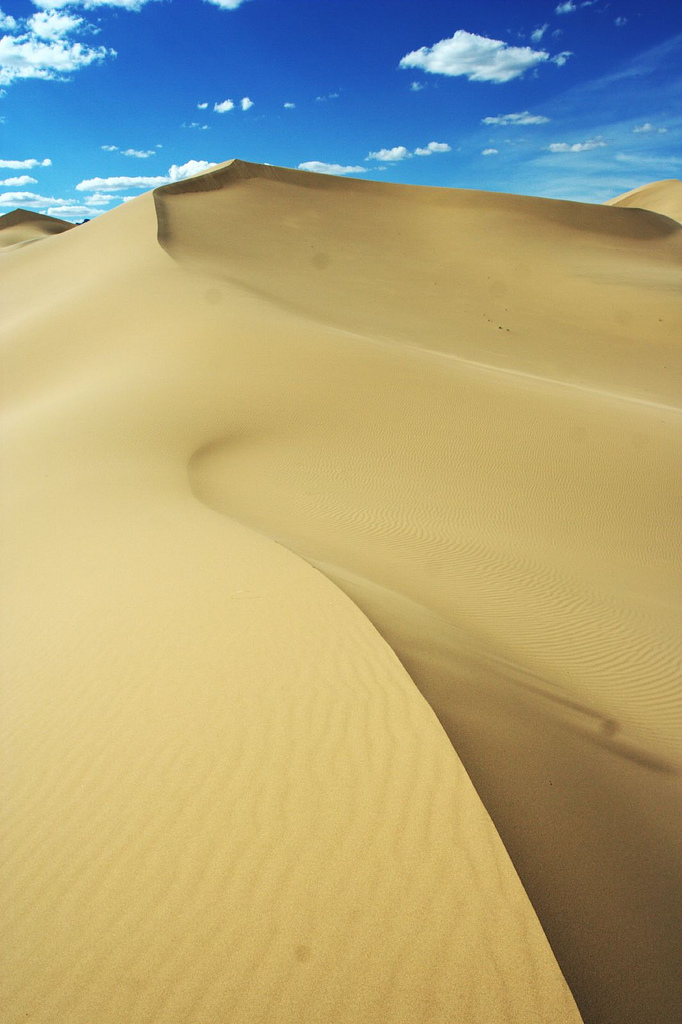
Sand dunes
