= Khongoryn Els =

Sand dunes in southern Mongolia

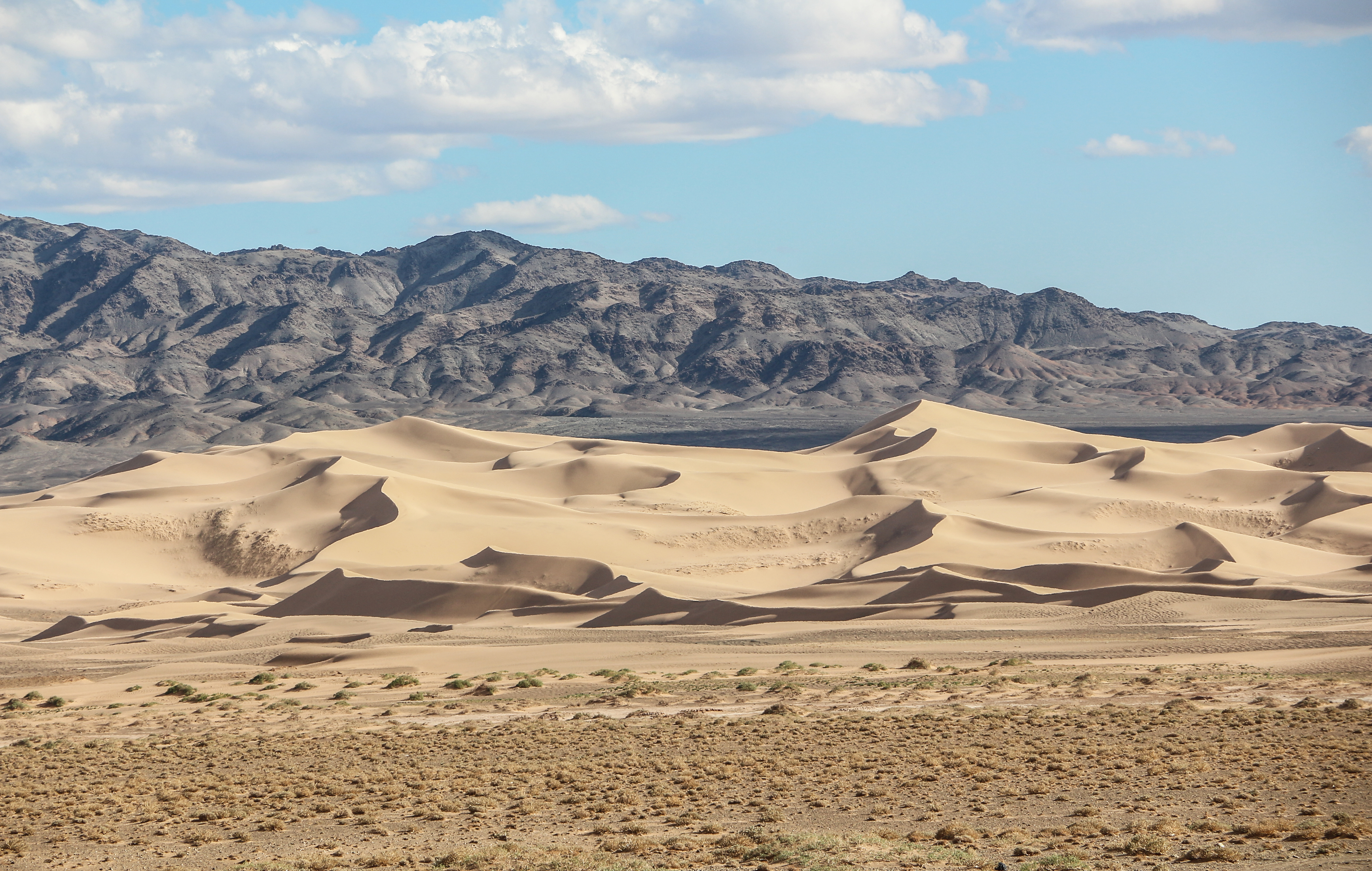
Khongoryn Els sand dunes

Khongoryn Els (Khongor Sand, Mongolian: Хонгорын элс) also called Duut Mankhan is popularly known as the "Singing Sands". It lies within the Gobi Gurvansaikhan National Park in Mongolia. The sand dunes extend to over 965 square kilometres (373 sq mi) area.

== Location ==
The dunes extending up to the foot of the high Altai Mountains range, lie about 180 kilometres (110 mi) from Dalanzadgad. It is at a distance of 130 kilometres (81 mi) along the desert tracks to Bogd in Övörkhangai in the north, and 215 kilometres (134 mi) to Bayanlig on the northwest in Bayankhongor. Travel through the desert is by vans.

== Features ==
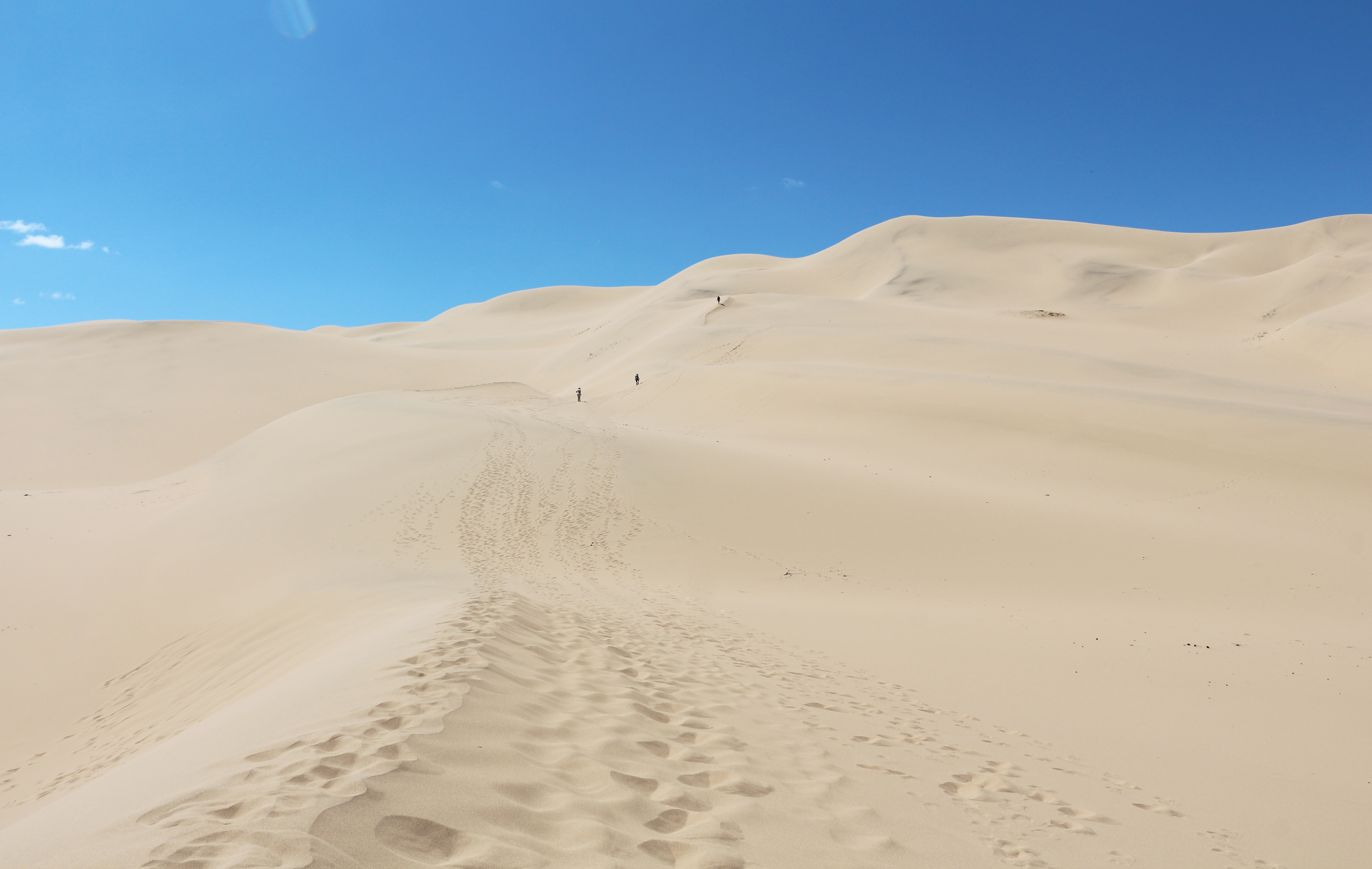
Khongoryn Els sand dunes

Mongolia has three types of deserts, and some of it has enough grass for livestock to graze, but the Khongoryn Els, in the extreme south of the Gobi Desert, has a huge range of sand dunes – 6–12 kilometres (3.7–7.5 mi) wide, 100 kilometres (62 mi) long (180 kilometres (110 mi) is also mentioned) and rising to a height of 80 metres (260 ft) (a maximum height to the apex can be 300 metres (980 ft)). They are similar to the dunes of Egypt. The sands have attractive curves which end in a sharp edge, making wave like patterns on the sand. They continually change shape due to wind and reflect yellow-white colours as the intensity of light changes during the day.

As the sand is moved due to winds or is in the process of collapse due to small avalanches, a strong sound is made giving it the name "Singing Sands." A French team has explained this phenomenon as due to a thin surface coating of slate over the sand grains which causes the sand to make a resonant sound. The sound is also attributed to heat, the weather conditions in the desert and to the avalanche effect caused by the sand particles moving harmoniously. This sound is also compared to the sound made by an aircraft during take-off and landing stages. Its length and width vary. The largest of these dunes is found in the northwestern end of the range.

The northern border of the dunes is skirted by a small river, the Khonggoryn Gol, where green pastures are noted. The river is sourced by subterranean flows from the mountains forming its valley. Grazing by camels and horses of the nomadic population of the area is noted. The wildlife recorded consist of Saker falcons, Pallas's sandgrouse and Saxaul sparrow, Corsac fox or red fox.

== Bibliography ==
- Blunden, Jane (1 October 2014). Mongolia. Bradt Travel Guides. ISBN 978-1-84162-416-7.
- Endicott, Elizabeth (13 November 2012). A History of Land Use in Mongolia: The Thirteenth Century to the Present. Palgrave Macmillan. ISBN 978-1-137-26966-9.
- Kavanagh, Jennifer (28 May 2015). Call of the Bell Bird: A Quaker travels the world. Jennifer Kavanagh. ISBN 978-1-78301-719-5.
- Godde, P. (2000). Tourism and Development in Mountain Regions. CABI. ISBN 978-0-85199-915-9.
- Kohn, Michael (2008). Mongolia. Ediz. Inglese. Lonely Planet. ISBN 978-1-74104-578-9.
- Reader, Lesley; Ridout, Lucy (2003). First-time Asia. Rough Guides. ISBN 978-1-84353-048-0.
