= Ninja miner =

Small-scale gold miners in Mongolia

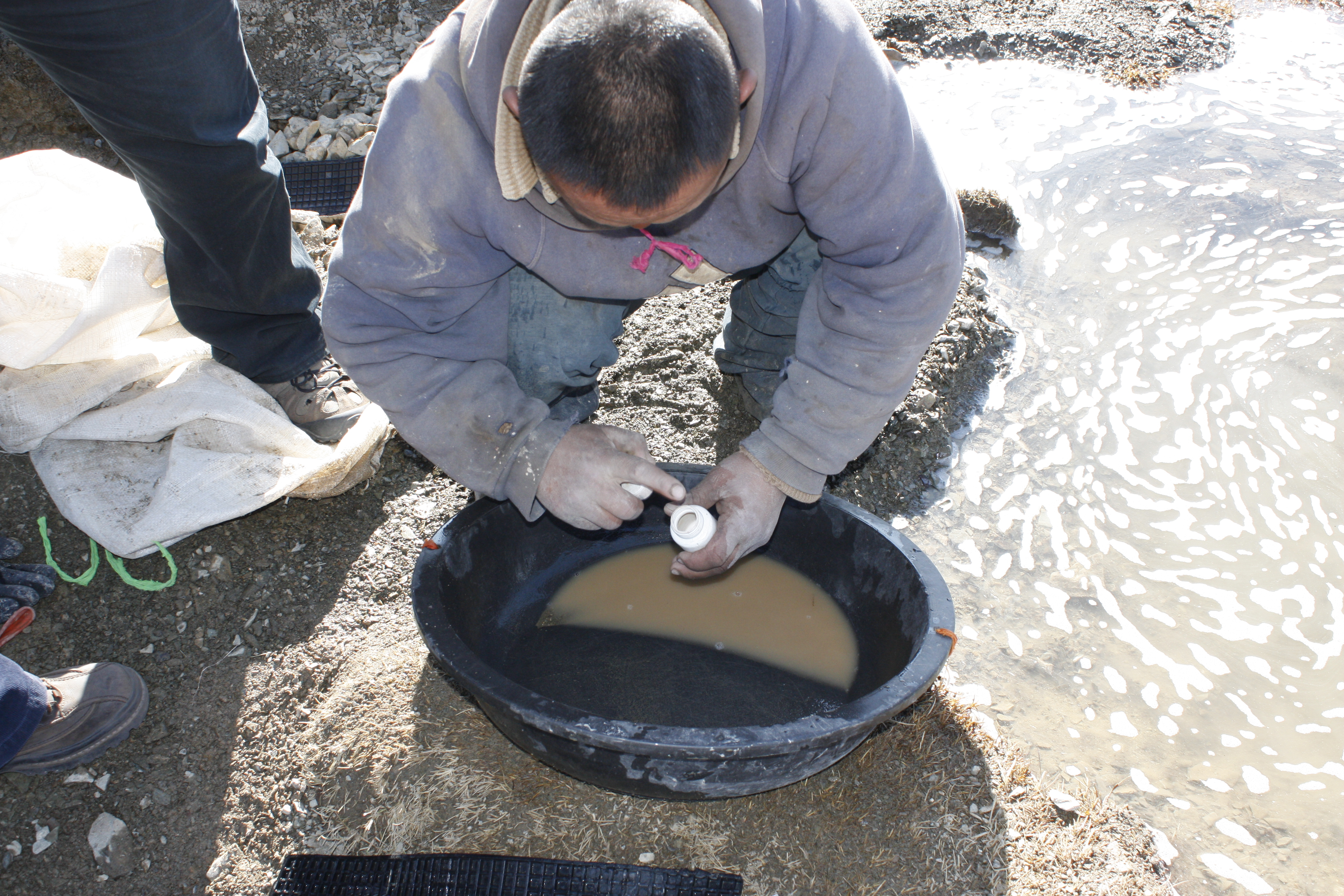
A Mongolian ninja miner, panning for gold

Ninja miner (Mongolian: Нинжа уурхайчин), or simply Ninja (Mongolian: Нинжа), is a nickname for a person who digs small unauthorized mines or pans dirt for gold in Mongolia. The miners are so named because the bowls they use for panning, when carried on their backs, are said to resemble the shells of the Teenage Mutant Ninja Turtles. Although the term initially referred only to gold miners, it has also been used derogatorily to describe any kind of informal, illegal small-scale miners in Mongolia.

The popular use of the term in Mongolia declined in the late 2010s, as the number of illegal small-scale miners decreased and informal mining operations largely regularized through the issuance of licenses by the Government of Mongolia.

== Origin ==
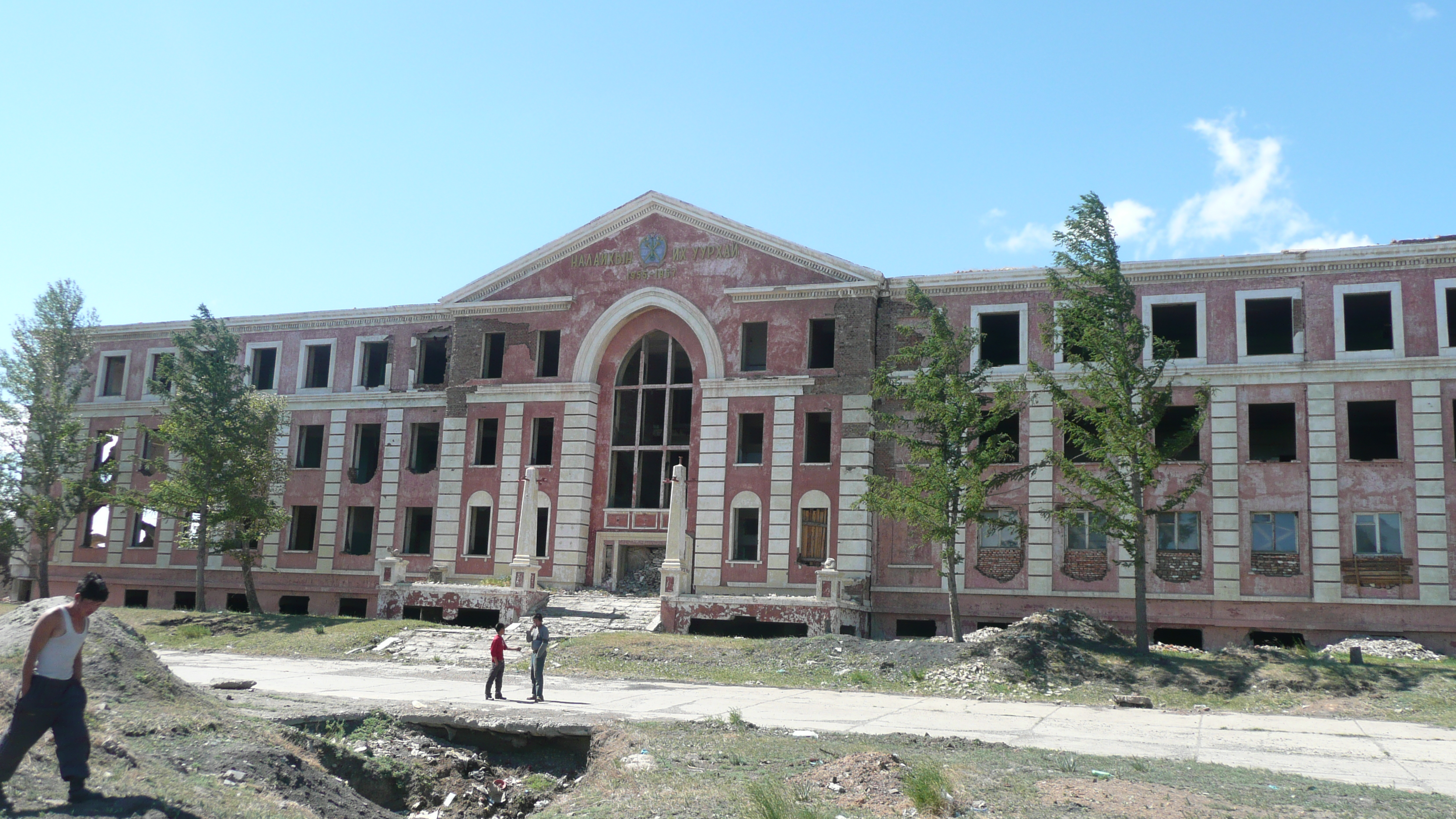
Nalaikh Coal Mine, which closed down in 1995

Many ninja miners are Mongolian miners who lost their jobs after the fall of the Mongolian People's Republic and subsequent economic crisis in the 1990s, when the country transitioned to a free market economy. The term is considered to have originated from Nalaikh, a district of Ulaanbaatar, which has a large source of coal. The closure of Mongolia's first coal mine, Nalaikh Coal Mine, in 1995, due to a methane explosion and bankruptcy, left around 5,000 miners unemployed. Subsequently, these miners resorted to primitive artisanal mining methods to extract brown coal.

=== Gold rush ===
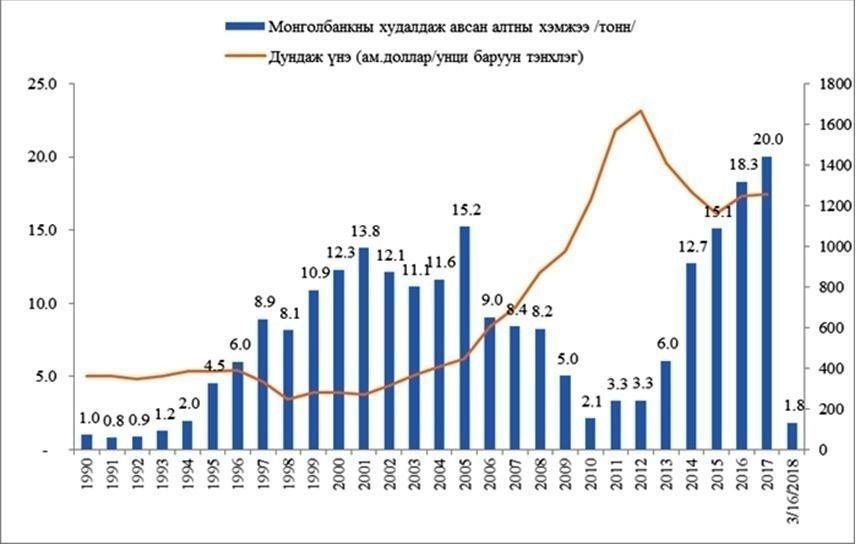
Blue: Gold purchased by Bank of Mongolia /tonnes/ Orange: Average price /US$ per ounce/

In 1992, when the country shifted from a planned economy to free-market capitalism, Mongolia's first president, Punsalmaagiin Ochirbat, implemented the "Gold" Programme (Mongolian: "Алт" Хөтөлбөр). The programme aimed to increase the country's gold extraction and attract foreign investment. The first Gold Programme lasted from 1992 to 2000, increasing annual gold output from 0.7 tonnes to 11 tonnes, as well as government tax revenue from the private sector. However, without any environmental and safety regulations, the programme led to the emergence of small-scale gold miners, colloquially known as ninja miners, across Mongolia. Most notably in gold-rich areas such as Zaamar in Töv Province, Sharyngol in Darkhan-Uul Province, and many deposits in Bayankhongor Province.

In 2001 and 2002, Mongolia faced two harsh winters (known as dzuds), and a third of the country's livestock was lost. Thousands of previously nomadic families took up ninja mining and searched for quartz or gold on properties large mining companies deemed unmineable. Mineral production, particularly gold mining, accounted for more than 50% of Mongolia's industrial output and more than 60% of the country's export revenues in 2005. According to the International Labour Organization (ILO), half of the gold production came from informal ninja miners, with an estimated annual production of 7.5 tonnes.

The continued rise of gold prices in the late 2000s and early 2010s intensified gold production in Mongolia. Consequently, causing a spike in illegal ninja mining, which has been compared to the California Gold Rush and the Klondike Gold Rush of the 19th century.

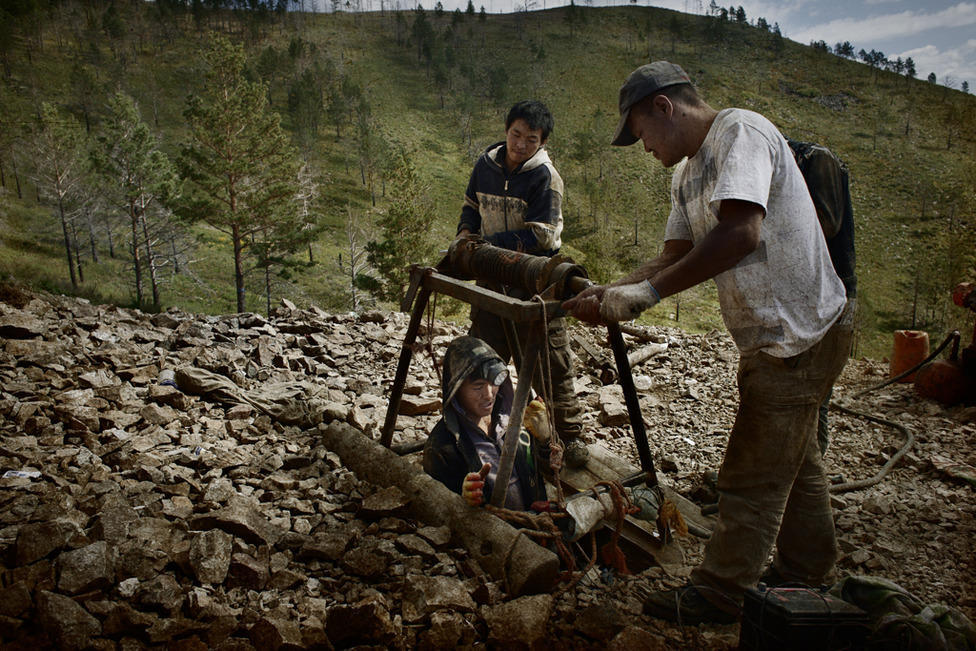
Ninja miners operating a handmade mine, 2014

== Process ==
The ninja mining process starts with a group of miners (up to four) digging a hole, usually 10–15 feet (3.0–4.6 m) deep, using iron stakes, or until reaching a depth with a high gold content. Holes that are near each other are connected underground. Upon completion of the hole, one ninja miner works at the bottom of the hole by candlelight, digging up dirt, while another pulls dirt to the surface to be sifted by yet another ninja miner. The handmade mines operate without any proper technology or protection against extreme danger. Many of the miners end up trapped in landslides or cave-ins.

In search of gold, ninja prospectors frequently move from one place to another. According to a 2018 Mongolian news article, once a discovery of gold is found or heard elsewhere, a group of around four to eight ninja miners is formed to immediately head off and search for gold.

In 2003, there were approximately 30,000 ninja miners in Mongolia, which increased to 100,000 in 2007. Ninja miners earned an average of US$10 a week in 2003, rising to US$5–10 per day in 2007.

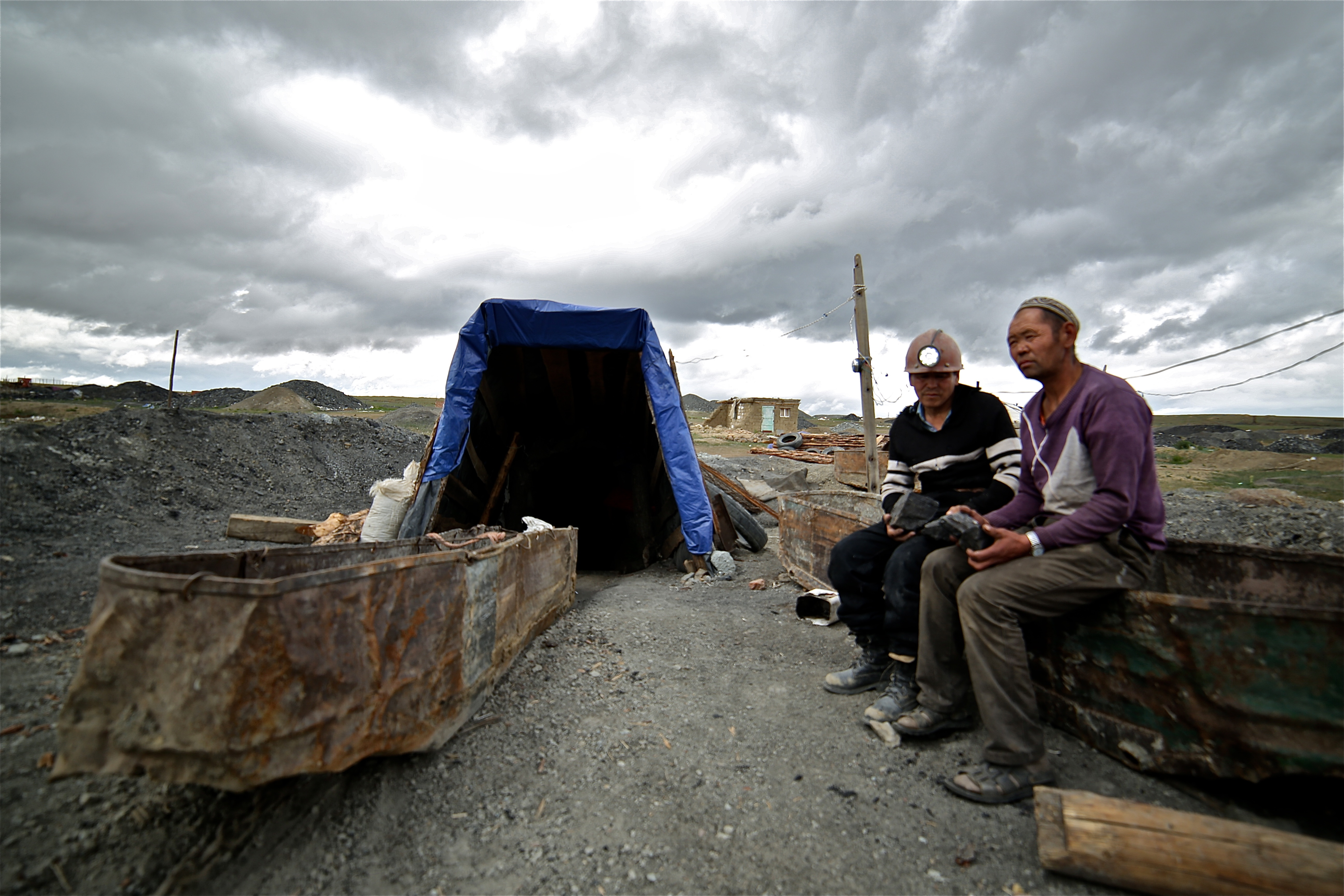
Miners at the site of Nalaikh coal mine, 2012

Child labour has been reported by the ILO, some working all year round without any protection. Students on summer break often work with their parents to help pay tuition.

== Regulation ==
In the late 2010s, the government started increasing efforts to formalize and regulate small-scale artisanal mining. The Mongolian Artisanal Miners' United Umbrella Association (MASM) (Mongolian: Монголын бичил уурхайчдын нэгдсэн Дээвэр холбоо) was established in May 2013 to represent and organize small-scale and artisanal miners.

With the government's formal recognition of small-scale mining, the informal term "ninja" was replaced with the official term "Private mineral miner" (KhAMO) (Mongolian: Хувиараа ашигт малтмал олборлогч, abbr. ХАМО). The MASM and the government made a strong distinction between KhAMO miners and responsible Small-Scale Miners (SSM). The latter is organized within the framework of relevant laws and operates in accordance with local guidelines.

In 2019, it was reported that there were around 6,500-10,000 SSMs affiliated with the MASM and 60,000-80,000 unregistered KhAMOs.

== Impacts ==
=== Impacts on agriculture ===
Ninja mining has had an adverse effect on agriculture, as nomadic herders are having to move more frequently to find land for their livestock to graze on due to the increase in holes and the reduced amount of grass. This, combined with the northward expansion of the Gobi Desert, led some herders to reduce their herds to focus on higher-quality livestock, while others gave up nomadism and set up farms and cooperatives. Subsequently, the pasturing income of many sums (district) have been negatively affected. Notable example being Urgamal sum in Zavkhan, where the entire primary income source was destroyed.

In 2007, Peter Morrow, the then-CEO of Khan Bank (former state agricultural bank), said this could be the end of traditional herding in Mongolia, "the last horse-based nomadic culture in the world" to The Times.

=== Impacts on the environment ===
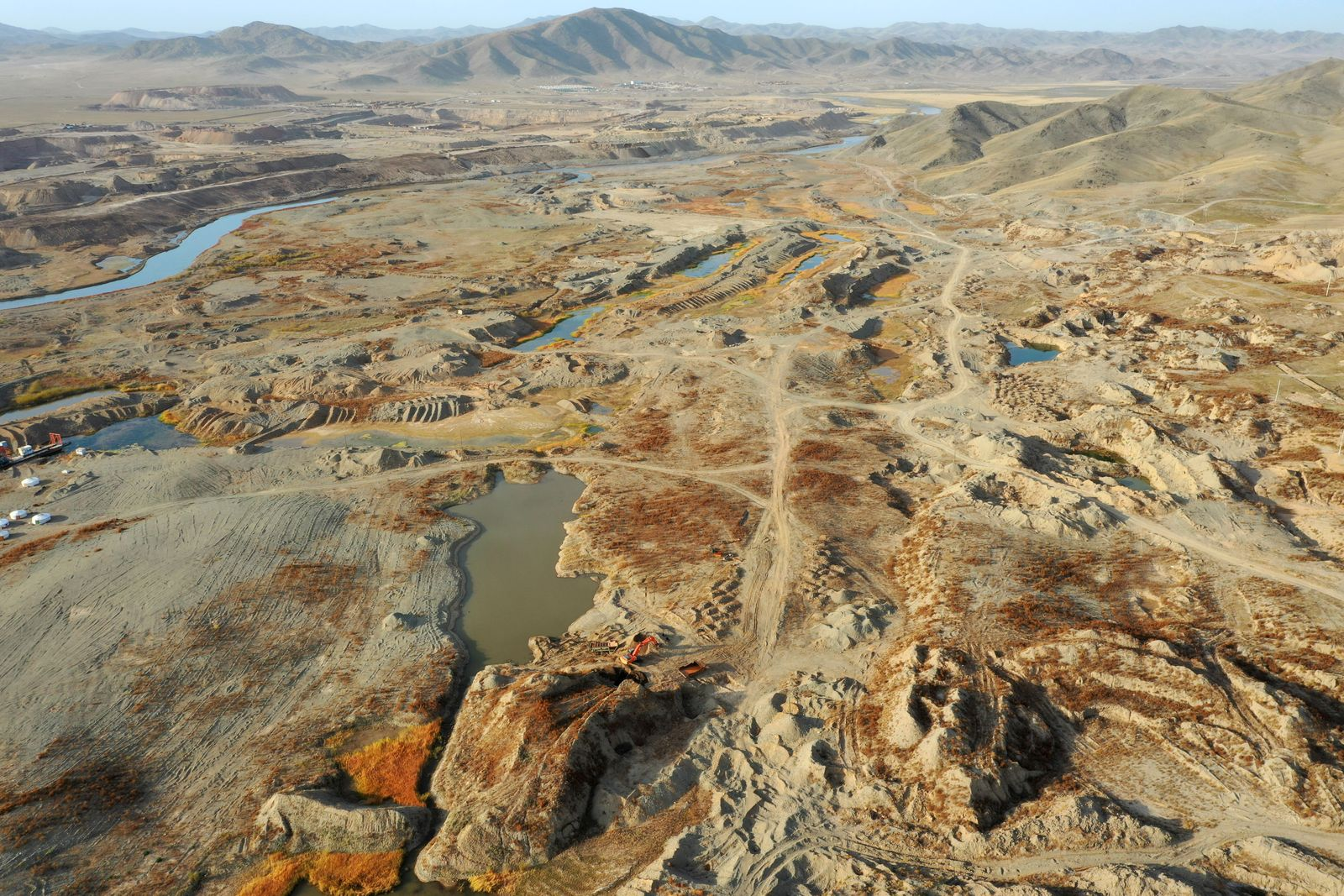
Land degraded by gold mining in Zaamar District, Töv Province

When the first Gold Programme was launched, between 1992 and 1996, the poor technical conditions of many companies and the non-existent concept of rehabilitation led to severe environmental degradation. The gold rush destroyed 5,700 hectares of land, increased water pollution in places like Yeröö and especially, Zaamar, where the ecosystem was severely damaged. Zaamar, which is a five-hour drive away from Ulaanbaatar, was one of the largest areas where ninja miners operated.

Despite the operation of 50 mining companies and the extraction of 120 tonnes of gold, Zaamar remained one of the least developed districts of Mongolia due to the degradation. The land that has been dug for 27 years reportedly began to experience desertification in 2017, according to an Eagle News article.

==== Water pollution ====
According to the Ministry of Environment, two inspections conducted in 2007-2008 revealed that 203 thousand tons of waste and sludge contaminated with mercury and cyanide were generated at more than 120 points in 10 provinces due to illegal artisanal gold mining. An area of around 53.2 hectares was contaminated. To tackle the pollution, a total of 48,574.5 tons of sludge at 85 points in 6 aimags were transported, and soil was stripped from 24,495 m² of areas contaminated with chemicals. More than 1 billion tugriks were spent from the state budget to neutralize the harmful environmental activities. It was also found that ninja miners were associated with toxic waste in 30-40% of the 120+ points. Individuals disposed of contaminated sludge in remote areas of the Gobi region by digging holes and dumping it in the open. The transportation of sludge by open trucks remained widespread.

Unregulated gold mining activities around the Tuul River have caused the dumping of unfiltered, turbid water containing fine sedimentary materials into the river, subsequently damaging the riverbed, surrounding soil, and vegetation.

=== Areas notably impacted ===
- Zaamar, Töv
- Sümber, Töv
- Uyanga, Övörkhangai
- Yeröö, Selenge
- Mandal, Selenge
- Sharyngol, Darkhan-Uul
- Urgamal, Zavkhan
- Dörvöljin, Zavkhan
- Tsagaannuur, Khövsgöl
- Biger, Govi-Altai
- Tsetseg, Khovd
- Bulgan, Khovd
- Altai, Khovd
- Dalanjargalan, Dornogovi
- Bayankhongor Province

== Incidents ==
During the 2006 Naadam festival, a group of ninjas attacked a gold mine operated by the domestic company "Monpolimet" in Zaamar. The violent confrontation resulted in multiple fatalities.

In 2010, after a sudden increase in gold prospectors since September, there were reported shootouts between the local Tsaatan residents and ninja miners at Tsagaannuur in Khövsgöl. A similar shootout occurred in Darvi sum, Govi-Altai, when gold was discovered in a nomad's winter quarter. Nearby prospectors rushed to the area in search of gold. However, the refusal of the household to allow the digging of their winter quarters led to the fatal shooting of a 28-year-old person by the miners, injury of around 20 people, and detention of 30 people by the police.

On 12 July 2012, Monpolimet company's gold mine in Büregkhangai sum, Bulgan, was stormed by ninjas. The group, armed with knives, threatened the security and internal troop guards and stole two sacks of semi-processed gold dust.

A gold mine owned by "Gunbileg Trade" LLC at Bornuur, Töv province, was raided by around 100 ninja miners in the night between 19 and 20 April 2014. Two detonations were made by the perpetrators, who then attempted to steal the debris containing gold. Law enforcement officers detained the ninjas and seized large amounts of explosives. A few days prior, 1,000 miners from across eight provinces stole a high amount of soil in the neighbouring gold deposit at Sümber.

In 2015, following a gold discovery in Biger sum, Govi-Altai, more than 1,000 gold prospectors from across Mongolia—including Khövsgöl, Ulaanbaatar, and Bayankhongor—rushed to the region in search of gold. The ensuing conflict over land led to one confirmed death. The same year, on the night of 10 September, 300 ninja miners with 50 vehicles attacked a mine owned by "Centerra Gold Mongolia" LLC at the Gatsuurt gold site in Selenge. During the raid, one security guard was buried in dirt, who was later saved by other guards after dispersing the invaders.

On 7 March 2018, at the Tsagaantolgoi area in Bulgan sum, Khovd, gold prospectors from Bayankhongor conflicted with local ninja miners. The exchange escalated into a knife fight. The ninjas seized control of a gold pit from one another; however, the takeover involved the brutal murder of a citizen identified as B, who was stabbed five times. Four people were stabbed 1-2 times in their chest, thighs, and chin.

== See also ==
- Artisanal mining
- Bootleg mining
- Illegal mining
- Mining in Mongolia
