= Nalaikh Coal Mine =

Coal mine in Nalaikh, Ulaanbaatar, Mongolia

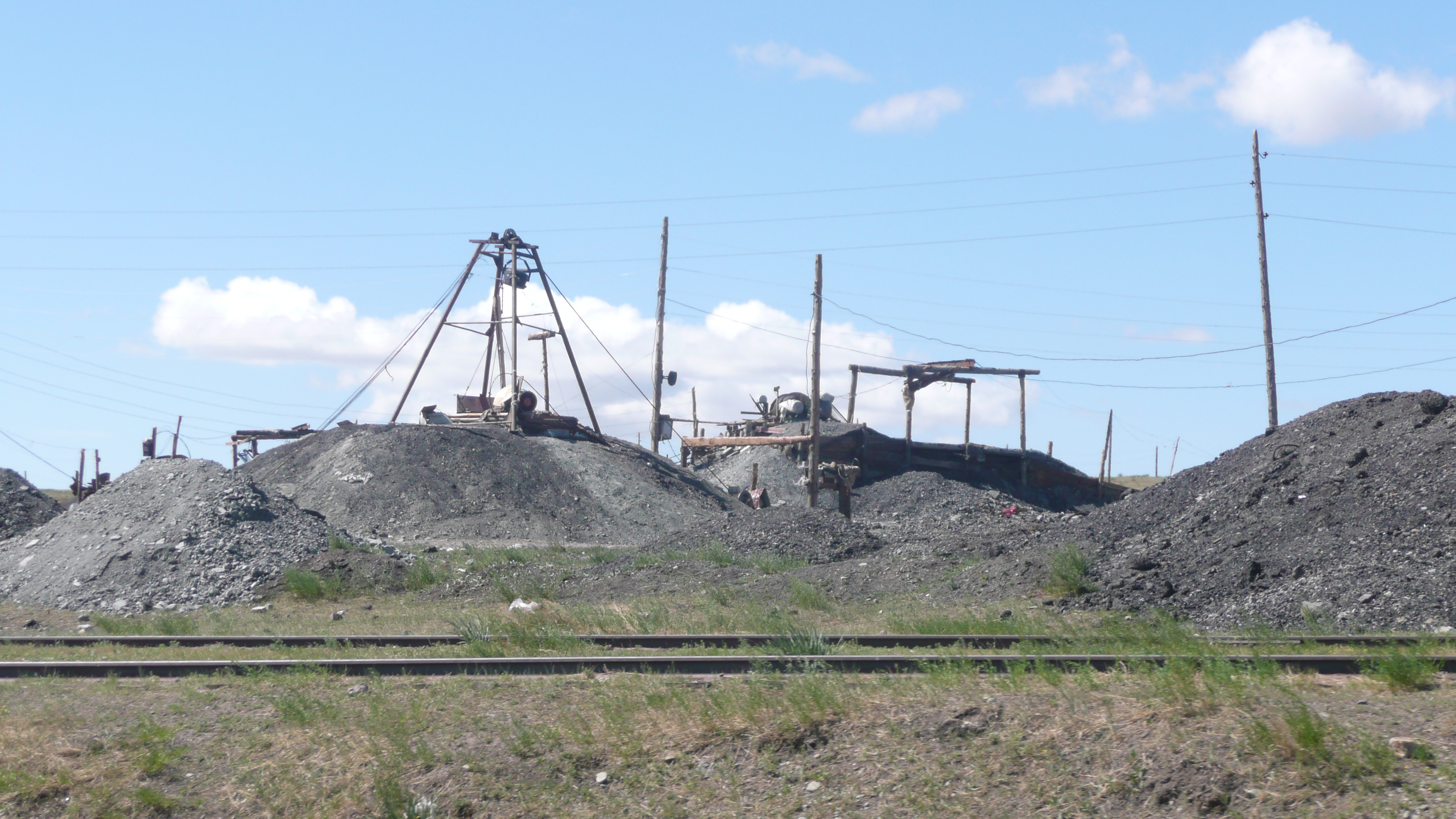
- Small-scale artisanal mining at the site, 2009

- Location within Mongolia
- Location: Nalaikh, Ulaanbaatar, Mongolia; 47°45′19.2″N 107°17′36.2″E
- Products: Brown coal
- Discovered: 1912
- Opened: 25 December 1922
- Active: 1922–1990
- Closed: 30 December 1995

The Nalaikh Coal Mine (Mongolian: Налайхын уурхай, lit. 'Nalaikh mine') was a coal mine in Nalaikh, around 30 kilometres away from Ulaanbaatar, the capital of Mongolia. Founded in 1922, it was the first operating mine in the country.

== History ==
=== Founding ===
In the early 20th century, during the Qing occupation of Mongolia, the Chinese discovered coal and began mining it by hand in 1912. In the aftermath of the People's Revolution of 1921, the area was nationalized.

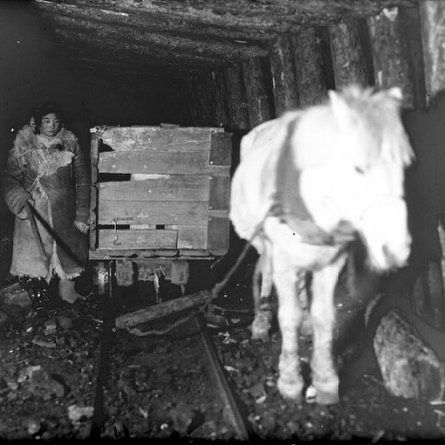
Horse carrying coal, circa 1930s

The Nalaikh coal mine was established on 25 December 1922, making it the first mining operation in Mongolia. In 1938, a railway line was built connecting Nalaikh to Ulaanbaatar's city center to transport coal from the mine. However, the mine's operations remained seasonal up until the 1950s.

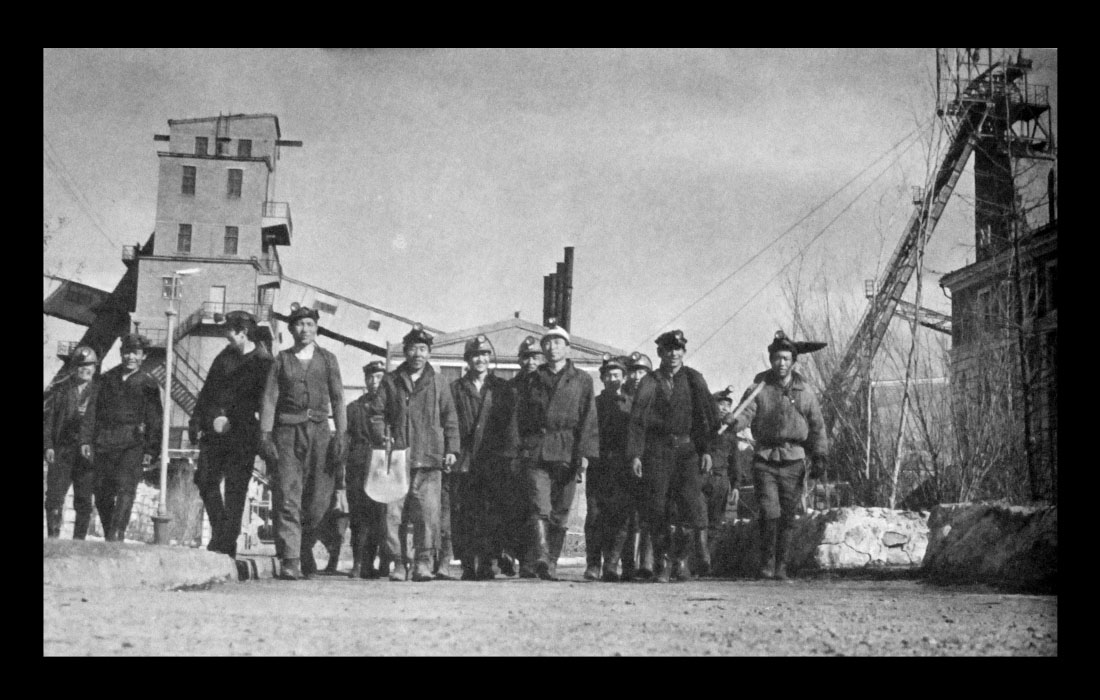
Nalaikh miners in 1972

Between 1954 and 1958, the mine underwent technological upgrades and expansion with the help of the Soviet Union, becoming the country's first modern mine and a major industrial hub during the socialist era. A settlement gradually grew around the area, granting the surrounding location city status in 1962.

The Nalaikh mine, during its operational years, supplied brown coal to Ulaanbaatar's thermal power plants and employed around 1,500 people.

Coal extraction between 1985 and 1982
Year	Coal mined (metric tons)	Production mining	Development mining
1958	466,100	1040	1557
1959	539,000	1166	4450
1960	587,100	2300	3124
1961	713,800	3335	4643
1962	801,600	3419	5223
1963	764,000	2475	5192
1964	512,500	923	3367
1965	600,400	974	5618
1966	509,000	1425	3626
1967	395,600	1043	5411
1968	451,700	1786	4335
1969	419,500	1133.5	1333.8
1970	553,500	846	5957
1971	500,200	1736	3413
1972	524,300	1206	5031
1973	539,700	1038	3854
1974	573,500	863	2472
1975	624,500	1046	4342
1976	695,800	489	5136
1977	810,300	1738	4330
1978	870,800	989	5075
1979	731,900	228	6594
1980	804,600	172	6528
1981	860,000	350	4674
1982	856,600	323	5401

=== Closure ===
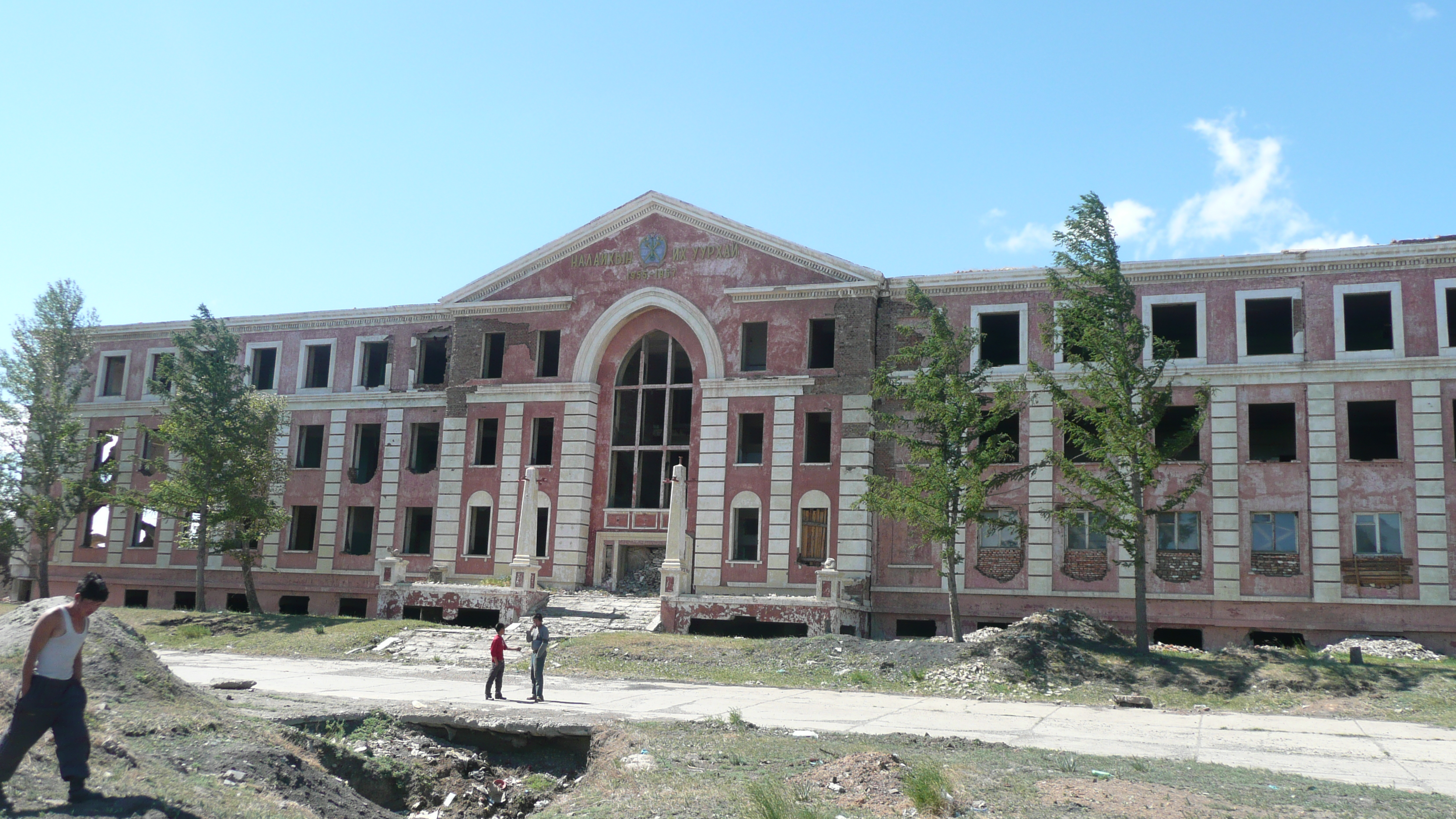
Abandoned headquarters of the Nalaikh Coal Mine in 2009

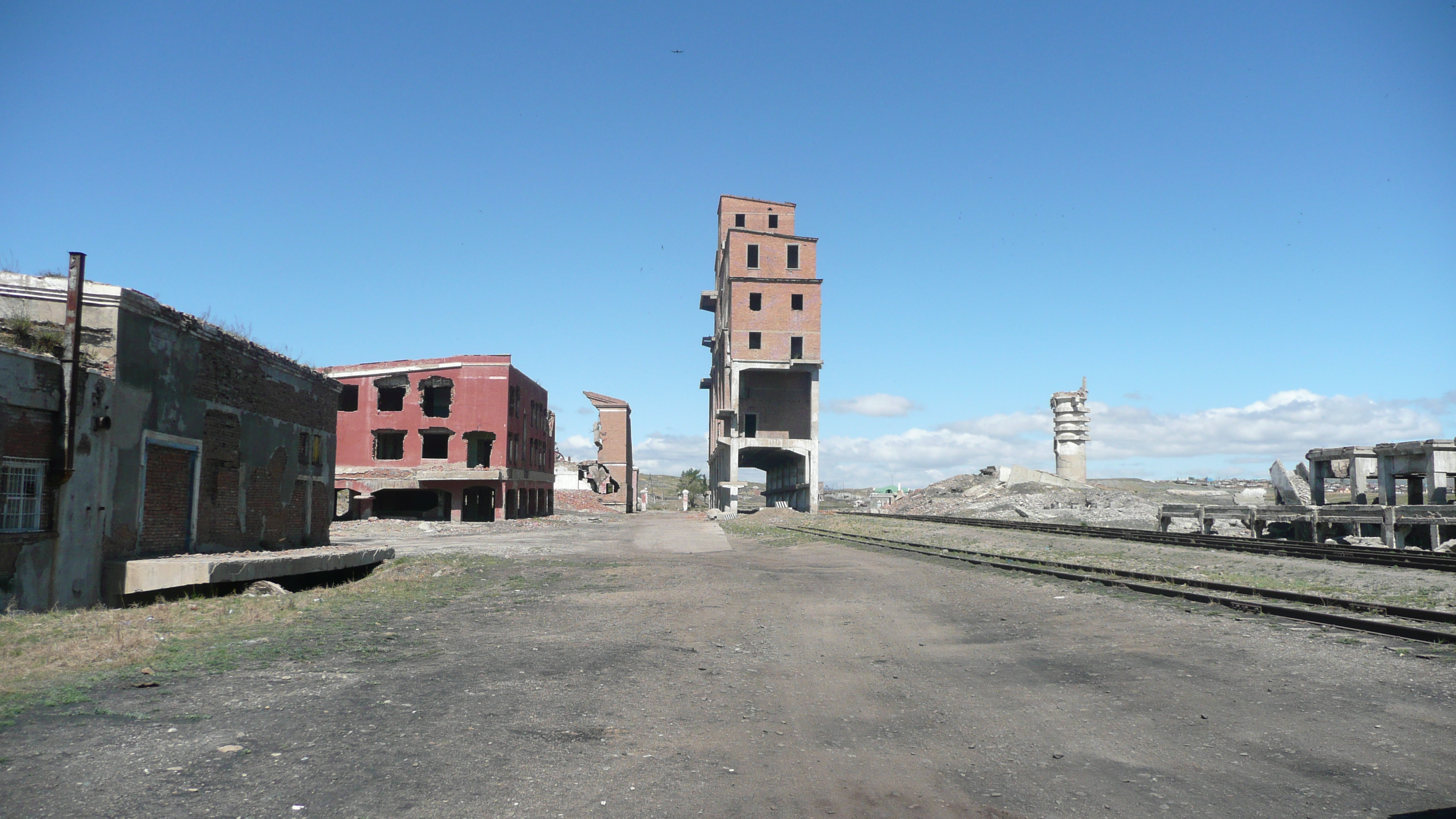
Old abandoned railway station, which was the first railway line to Ulaanbaatar, and part of the former mine complex

With the fall of communism and economic stagnation, the technology required for large-scale underground operations became unaffordable. On 17 December 1990, a fatal methane gas explosion at the site killed 21 people and forced the government to halt production. On 30 December 1995, the mine was closed permanently.

== Present day ==
Following the closure of the mine, illegal artisanal mining has taken root around the area, with high safety concerns. Derogatorily, the small-scale informal miners are referred to as ninja miners in Mongolia.

As of 2019, there are reportedly around 200 self-made mines in the region, usually operational seasonally. Coal is not mined in the summer because of loose soil, which dramatically increases the risk of cave-ins. In winter, when the ground is frozen, mining is much safer to operate.

Between 2004 and 2009, 125 people lost their lives, and 287 were injured at the mines. From 2010 to 2013, 61 people died. Since its closure, more than 180 people have died in the mine according to 2014 data. The death toll from such mining has exceeded 200 as of 2019. On average, approximately 15 people die in cave-ins each year.

The capital's power plants no longer use the local coal. The production volumes are relatively small and have no industrial value. It is mainly purchased by residents of Nalaikh and Ulaanbaatar for heating their yurts in Ger districts.

== See also ==
- Mining in Mongolia
