= Sümber =

Sümber (Mongolian: Сүмбэр, Sumeru) is a frequent compound in Mongolian place names. It may refer to:

- Govisümber Province
- Sümber, Töv
- Sümber, Govisümber

== See also ==
- Sumber (disambiguation)
