= Bugant, Selenge =

Bag in Yeröö, Selenge, Mongolia

Coordinates: 49°25′34″N 107°16′57″E

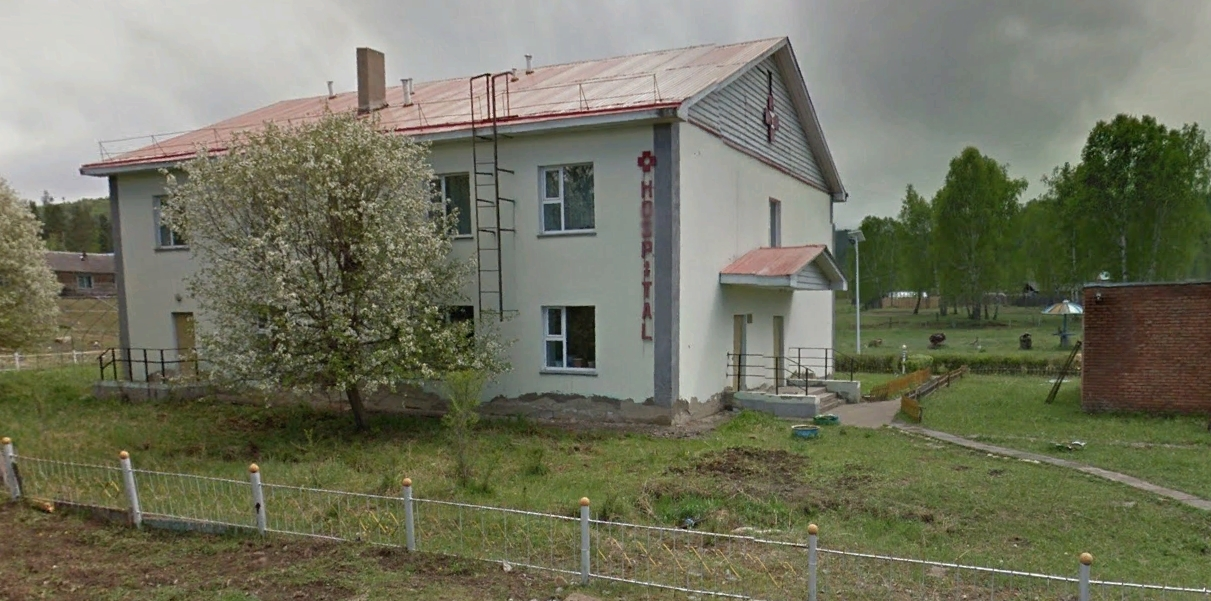
The hospital

Bugant (Mongolian: Бугант) is a bag in Yeröö sum (district) of Selenge Province in northern Mongolia. It is 66 km southeast from Yeröö sum center and 112 km northeast from Züünkharaa city.

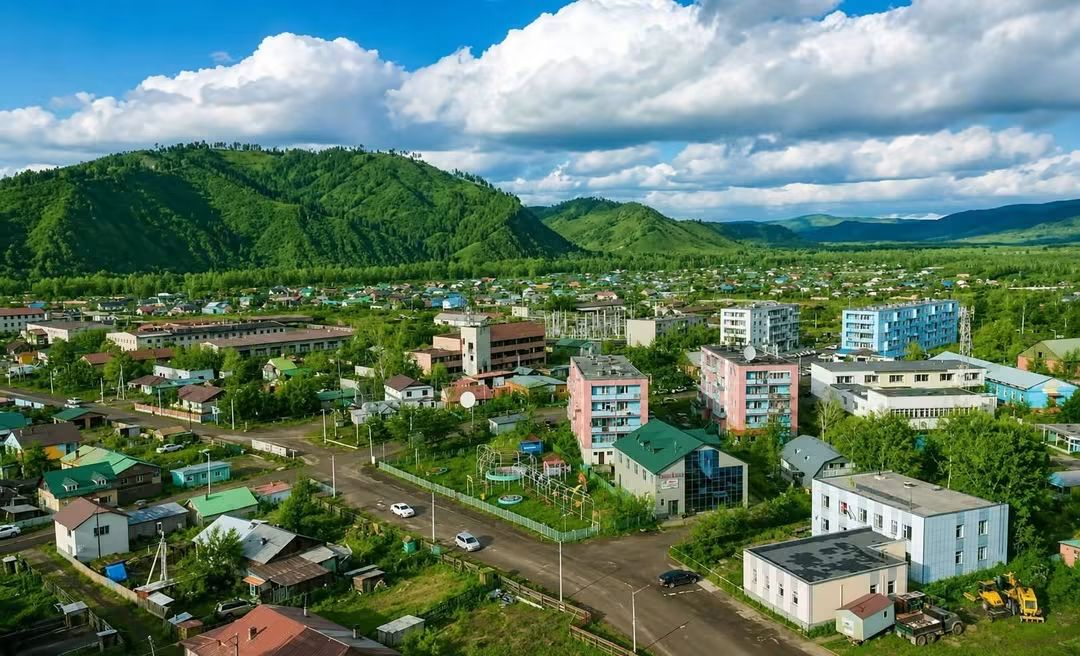
Bugant town

Bugant was built in the socialist period as a gold mining center.The nearest large city is Darkhan.

It was established in 1926.

During the socialist era, Bugant experienced rapid growth as workers from across Mongolia were assigned to the settlement to support the forestry, timber-processing, and mining industries. Forestry became one of the town's principal economic activities, while gold mining also contributed to its development. Today, the local economy continues to rely on mining, wood processing, and the collection of wild pine nuts and other forest products from the surrounding forests.

Bugant is situated in a mountainous and heavily forested area of northern Selenge Province. The surrounding landscape is characterized by dense forests, rolling hills, and rivers.
