= Artisanal mining =

Independent, small-scale, subsistence mining

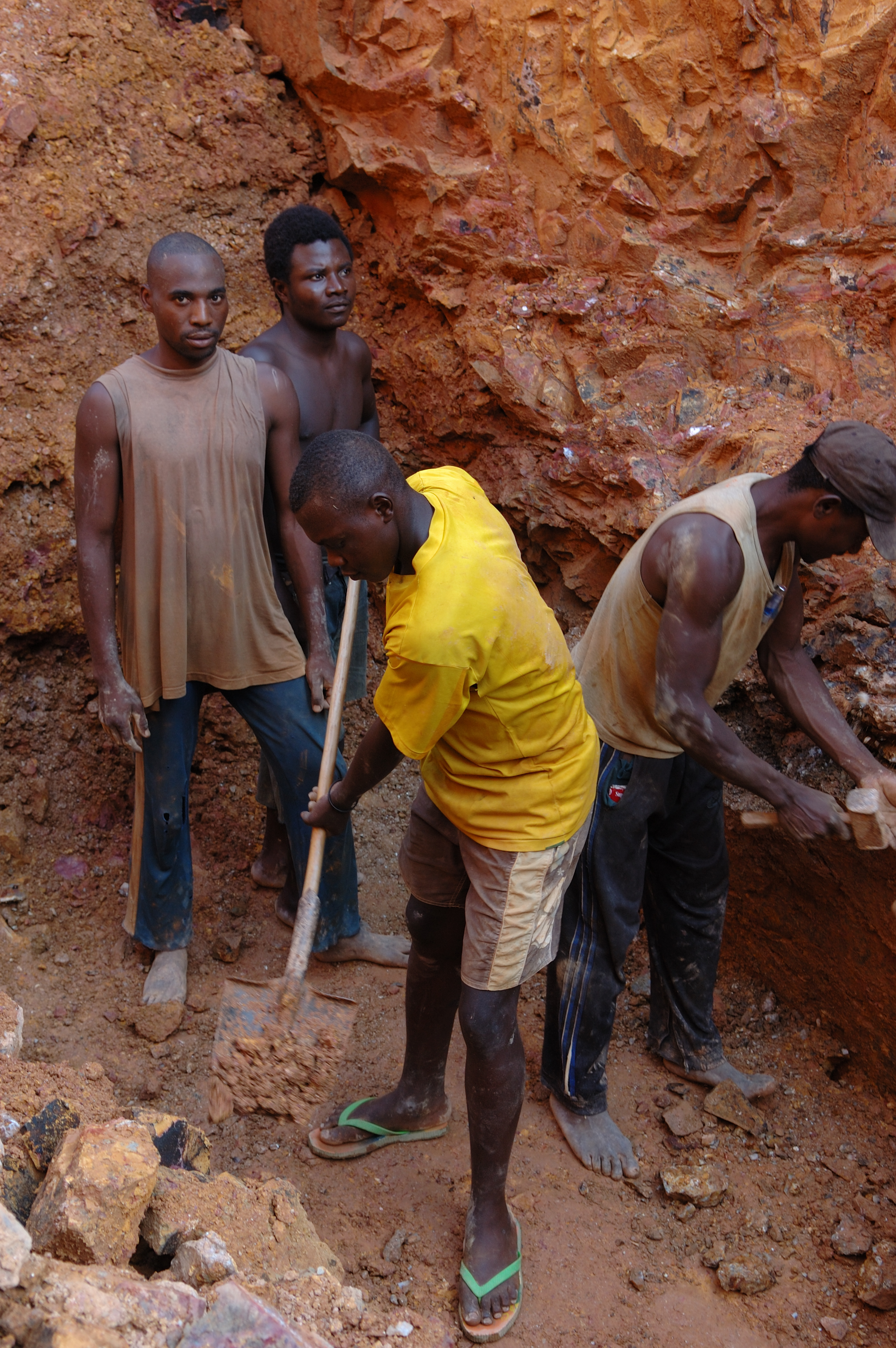
Artisanal wolframite mining in Kailo Territory, DRC

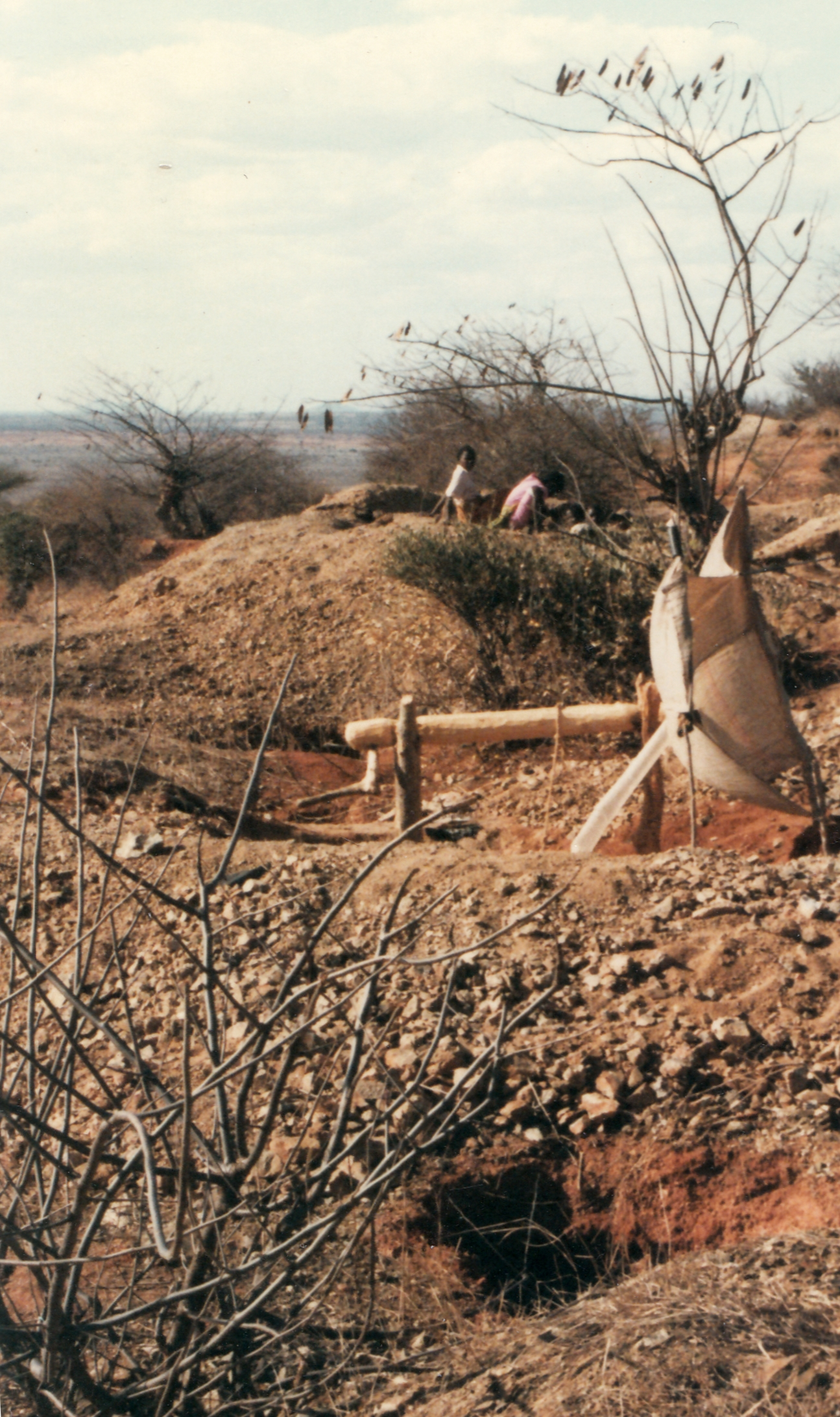
Artisanal gold mines near Dodoma, Tanzania. Makeshift sails lead fresh air underground.

Artisanal and small-scale mining (ASM) is a blanket term for a wide variety of types of small mining that range from manual subsistence mining using simple tools to vocational mining that is semi-mechanised involving light machinery such as generators, water pumps, and small motorized mills, through to organised mechanised mining that employs industrial equipment such as excavators and bulldozers. ASM involves miners who may or may not be officially employed. Although there can be large numbers of miners working at a mining site, they typically work in small teams according to a customary system of organisation that includes a manager, skilled and unskilled labour.

While the terms are generally used interchangeably or synonymously, by definition 'artisanal mining' refers to purely manual labor while 'small-scale mining' typically involves larger operations and some use of mechanical or industrial tools. While there is no completely coherent definition for ASM, artisanal mining generally includes miners who are not officially employed by a mining company and use their own resources to mine. As such, they are part of an informal economy. ASM also includes, in small-scale mining, enterprises or individuals that employ workers for mining, but who generally still use similar manually-intensive methods as artisanal miners (such as working with hand tools). In addition, ASM can be characterized as distinct from large-scale mining (LSM) by less efficient extraction of pure minerals from the ore, lower wages, decreased occupational safety, benefits, and health standards for miners, and a lack of environmental protection measures. ASM has on occasion been evaluated positively in terms of negligible capital outflow, the employment it generates and the connection it has with local society and economy in contrast with the enclave economies of some LSM.

Artisanal miners often undertake the activity of mining seasonally. For example, crops are planted in the rainy season, and mining is pursued in the dry season. However, they also frequently travel to mining areas and work year-round. There are four broad types of ASM:

1. Permanent artisanal mining
2. Seasonal (annually migrating during idle agriculture periods)
3. Rush-type (massive migration, pulled often by commodity price jumps)
4. Shock-push (poverty-driven, following conflict or natural disasters).

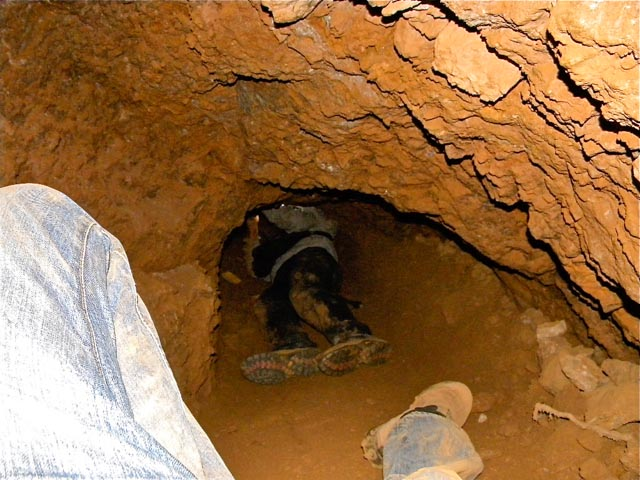
Interior of an artisanal mine near Low's Creek, Mpumalanga Province, South Africa. The human figures, exploring this mine, show the scale of tunnels driven entirely with hand tools (two-kilogram (4.4 lb) hammer and hand-forged scrap-steel chisel).

ASM is an important socio-economic sector for the rural poor in many developing nations, many of whom have few other options for supporting their families. Over 90% of the world's mining workforce are engaged in ASM, with an estimated 40.5 million people directly engaged in ASM, from over 80 countries in the global south. More than 150 million people indirectly depend on ASM for their livelihood. 70–80% of small-scale miners are informal, and approximately 30% are women, although this ranges in certain countries and commodities from 5% to 80%.

== Economic output ==
Artisanal mining can include activities as simple as panning for gold in rivers, to as complex as development of underground workings and small-scale processing plants. Miners use a variety of methods to locate minerals, including historical knowledge, the observation of other minerals or rocks, or technology such as mineral detectors and audio-based reflection seismology surveys. In addition, ASM targets a variety of minerals in addition to metals, including bauxite, coltan, cobalt, coal, sand, gravel, and dimension stones.

=== International market ===
The rise in the price of certain minerals, such as precious stones or precious metals, has driven rural residents in the global south to increasingly turn to artisanal mining as supplementary income, as higher mineral prices yield better returns for those engaged in ASM. This is reflected in the growth of the ASM industry. For instance, the 400% rise in the price of gold from 2002 (US$274/oz) to 2012 (US$1,230/oz) appears to be reflected as an increase in the number of miners engaged in ASM. Similarly, an increase in demand for lithium-ion battery-powered products has led to increased demand for cobalt, leading to a corresponding boom in ASM for minerals containing cobalt.

Globally, artisanal mining contributes 17% to 20%, or between 380 and 450, metric tonnes of annual gold production. This gold input is equally a significant contribution to both the international gold industry and the economy for a given community.

The ASM sector produces 80% of the global sapphire supply, 20% of global diamond supply, 26% of the global tantalum supply, and 25% of global tin production.

=== Domestic market ===
ASM also supplies development minerals (minerals used for construction, such as bauxite, sand, gravel, coltan, coal, and dimension stones) for domestic markets. Instead of being exported abroad, these minerals are used for construction, energy production, and other purposes in the home country of the ASM operation.

ASM serves as additional supplemental income for rural communities in many parts of the global south, with miners either establishing mutually beneficial relationships with farmers, or being farmers themselves. This is particularly the case for individuals in rural communities who lack urban economic opportunities. As part of seasonal ASM, for instance, farmers may use income they gained from ASM in the dry season to finance the purchasing of agricultural equipment or seed in the rainy season, or might also sell surplus crops to those already engaged in ASM.

== Economic opportunities ==
ASM, if properly regulated, has the capacity to lift people out of poverty, improve health and environmental conditions, and create better economic conditions for entire regions through job creation and supplementary income.

ASM is particularly relevant for people in rural communities. Many poor populations in rural areas of the global south lack the employment opportunities that urban areas include, which ASM can supplement. Furthermore, neoliberal structural adjustment programs have disproportionately targeted urban centers as opposed to rural areas. Such programs are intended to help multinational corporations invest in developing countries with fewer trade and regulatory barriers, such as the reforms implemented by the IMF in over 70 countries following the Latin American debt crisis of the 1980s. Here, the IMF's goal was to promote economic growth in the private sector, reducing reliance on state sponsorship. Under these types of neoliberal structural adjustment programs, reports of child labor violations, insufficient safety standards, and environmental violations are commonplace. For many in mineral-rich areas, artisanal mining is the only source of income immediately available, despite hazardous conditions, in informally organized areas where rules can vary based on legal means, corruption, violence, or cultural norms, weakened worker protections can exacerbate existing tensions. For instance, in Sub-Saharan Africa, each of the 8 million people seasonally or permanently employed in ASM is estimated to use income gained from ASM to support an average of 5–6 other people (an estimated 45 million in total). ASM also includes ancillary industries such as shipping and processing ore not directly related to the act of mining that can provide additional jobs.

Although there are large industrial mines worldwide, artisanal mines employ many more people. In 2017, while 7 million people worldwide were employed in large-scale mining, around 40 million people were employed in ASM, typically workers who are not eligible for employment in industrial mining due to a lack of formal education and experience. Bringing ASM into the formal economy through legalization could theoretically benefit governments in that they reduce illicit financial transactions, can collect taxes on ASM income, and often see a subsequent reduction in crime in these regions. However, ASM is by nature dispersed and tends to be located in more remote areas that make it difficult to completely formalize. Formalization is made more difficult by the control that armed groups, from militants to criminal organizations, have over many ASM operations.

== Issues around ASM ==
=== Formalization and unionization ===
The majority of miners engaged in ASM miners worldwide do not have legal title, and oftentimes the regulatory frameworks for national mining policy work to exclude or restrict ASM practices. Currently, the informal nature of ASM in many places prevents the state from taxing income gained from ASM, as well as from setting tariff rates on exported minerals.

In addition, even if ASM is legal, it is often still very difficult for ASM workers to obtain licenses. The license process might be very long, limited to citizens of the state in which it is located, or very costly. As a result, even when licenses are technically available, many ASM operators will choose to remain informal. The informal nature of ASM contributes to ASM's vulnerability to being controlled by armed actors such as organized crime, its environmental pollution, and poor safety standards for miners.

=== Health and safety ===
ASM presents a wide range of physical hazards to workers including the use of hazardous materials such as mercury, lead, uranium, and cyanide, poorly constructed pits/shafts/tunnels prone to collapses/landslides/flooding/lack of ventilation, poor waste management leading to water contamination and diseases, lack of PPE (personal protective equipment) or training in proper use leading to silicosis and other health risks, impacts related to dust/noise/exhaustive labor, lack of potable water/latrines/sanitation facilities leading to gastrointestinal and other diseases, and physical risks from inappropriate use and maintenance of mechanical equipment. As a result, child labor and a large number of fatal accidents have been reported in artisanal mines (especially coal mines, gold mines, and stone mines).

Improving monitoring and reporting on occupational health and safety is an important first step, as well as training on standards and skills. A recent project of the tin working group of IDH addressed these challenges in the Indonesian tin ASM sector. Key results included sector dialogue and alignment, improved regulatory framework, awareness-raising to improve supply chain practices and training guidelines for more responsible ASM techniques.

=== Historical, political and economic factors ===
According to scholars like Galvin Hilson and Naomi Klein, natural resource extraction in areas with high levels of ASM often traces back to colonial roots, especially in countries in Africa, Asia, and South America. For example, the late 19th century marked the beginning of the "Scramble for Africa" in which major colonial powers sought to divide the African continent for commercial gain. The Berlin Conference, which took place from November 1884 to February 1885, allowed for major colonial powers, including Belgium, France, Germany, Great Britain, Portugal, Italy, and Spain, to negotiate the terms of their occupation of Africa. On February 26, 1885, these agreed upon terms were documented in the General Act of the Berlin Conference on West Africa. Colonial powers often negotiated and made agreements with traditional authorities of the areas they sought to occupy, often benefitting from commercial trade and production.

According to researchers Van Butsic and Matthias Baumann, such colonial exploitation created the structures necessary for exploitation in the modern mining sector. Exploitation within the mining sector has predated modern mining technological development. In many colonies, economies were established based on extraction and exporting to profit colonizer states. Exports were often precious stones and minerals, crops, or animal byproducts. The introduction and proliferation of global mechanization did not reach ASM communities, who are prevented from accessing modern infrastructure and technological advancements. In many contexts, especially in Africa, Asia, and South America, these disparities within ASM also span from existing racial, ethnic, and gender inequalities. Corporations and nations that rely on ASM, particularly cobalt mining, benefit from both development and sale of these natural resources. According to Emmanuel Archibong, the increased demand for renewable energy sources has created a modern style of extractive exploitation that mirrors that of the colonial period.

According to author Siddarth Kara, one example of how these colonial histories and systems structure current mining practices is the Democratic Republic of Congo (DRC), Kara explains that the DRC has become a hotspot of artisanal mining operations following a legacy of colonial and post-colonial exploitative resource extraction. Before independence, Belgium's King Leopold II used mercenaries to force the Congolese population into enslavement, seeking profit from first ivory and then rubber with the rise in demand for automobiles. Eventually, the DRC became the most profitable colony in Africa. Post independence, Belgium supported Moïse Tshombe, the head of a political party that favored secession for the mineral-rich Katanga region. In turn, Belgium continued to profit from resource extraction and the newly independent Congolese state was unable to function without the income generated from Katanga. Patrice Lumumba, an advocate for Congolese economic autonomy, was brutally killed and Joseph Mobutu, a prominent military figure during the struggle for independence, took complete control of the government.

Kara further explains how Joseph Mobutu, also known as Mobutu Sese-Seko, continued to use Katanga's resources to strengthen personal connections and relationships with Europe and the United States. Wealth disparities increased throughout the country and corruption was rampant on both a local and national level. Tensions between Katangan mining communities, the fall of the Soviet Union, and violent conflict in neighboring countries exacerbated the damage done to the Congolese state under Mobutu, inspiring a coalition of Katangan and Rwandan forces to remove him from power. Subsequent leaders continued to embezzle funds and promote a corrupt state, despite civil war and shifting international relations. Neocolonial practices shifted the country away from Lumumba's goal of building a strong state, and the rise in demand for cobalt has strained the DRC's supply chains further.

=== Child labour ===
Child labour is pervasive across many ASM contexts, and integrated approaches are needed to target its root causes. Due to its hazardous nature to children's safety, health (physical and mental) and moral development, mining is considered one of the "worst forms" of child labour as defined by the ILO. There are at least one million child miners across the world, although the number is probably much higher due to the difficulty of collecting data.

In addition, ASM, by employing children, can prevent children from receiving education. This is especially in cases of migratory ASM or where agricultural land is converted to ASM land use, such as in the northern districts of Burkina Faso. Children, who are often seen as less suspicious by authorities, often act as smugglers or perform key correspondence tasks. Because of their smaller nature, child miners are valued for their dexterity in cramped mining conditions. For these reasons, children have access to opportunities for economic mobility at a young age, often superseding the need for education in terms of immediate benefits. Exposure to hazardous working conditions increases the likelihood of injury, respiratory disease, psychological aftereffects, developmental setbacks, and fatal accidents. Other adverse health effects include dehydration, neurological damage, musculoskeletal disorders, infections, stunted growth, and behavioral disorders. According to Siddarth Kara, "Boys as young as six took wide stances an summoned all the strength in their bony arms to hack at the earth with rusted spades… I passed by more putrid washing pools and scores of pits filled with men and boys hacking and shoveling. Every so often, a group of exhausted children could be found sitting in the dirt under the harsh afternoon sun, eating dirty bread."

Economic opportunities for male and female children differ, as girls are often exposed to surface work considered appropriate to females, such as cooking, foraging, and processing food. Within the mineral supply chain, girls are sought after as smugglers and mineral processors. However, women and girls working within ASM often still must perform domestic responsibilities within their communities in addition to ASM labor. Women and girls are also victims of sexual exploitation at a higher rate than their male counterparts. Similarly, because men dominate within both the domestic and economic spheres in many ASM communities, women are often victims of domestic violence and social stigmatization. In some cases, the lack of confidence in women performing traditionally 'male' tasks allows for discreet advancement of women involved in ASM. Employment in artisanal mining, which is often portrayed as one of the most accessible opportunities for economic mobility, is limited because physically intensive labor is often viewed as unfit for women.

The Pact's Children out of Mining (Swahili: Watoto Inje ya Mungoti) project in the Democratic Republic of Congo has helped to achieve a more than 90% reduction in child labor at targeted mines, using novel approaches including various community governance committees, awareness-raising and positive parenting skills training, peer exchanges, traditional song and dance, sport, children's interactive forums and traditional signage and radio media strategies.

Terre des Hommes works on addressing child labour in the mica mines in Madagascar. In Madagascar, about 10,000 children work in mica mines, prolonging exposure to extreme heat and poor air quality. Terre des Hommes works to integrate social, public, and private solutions to problems posed by mica extraction and trade. In particular, Terre des Hommes works to provide education access and psychological support to children while helping families meet their income needs.

=== Environmental pollution ===
Artisanal mining has been accused of being a major contributor to environmental degradation and pollution, especially given the lack of government oversight ASM entails.

Mining has significant effects on water use and quality. Increased erosion can result in high amounts of suspended solids in waterways, increasing the temperature and worsening the oxygen quality of the water. This damages the natural habitat of marine wildlife in rivers and waterways near ASM sites. ASM uses less water than large-scale mining for extraction, but processing minerals requires a large amount of water. ASM effects on water quality vary according to processing methods, the type of mine, and its proximity to water resources. A common problem in ASM is acid rock drainage (ARD), also referred to as acid mine drainage (AMD). Although this process happens naturally, mining increases the amount of sulfide-bearing material that is exposed, releasing low concentrations of toxic heavy metals. AMD is often left untreated because of how either expensive or inadequate the technology is to treat it. Toxic metals from mining sites that pollute waterways accumulate and travel through bodies of water, affecting both aquatic wildlife and the people and animals who use those water systems.

Due to the inherent digging of soil and sluicing involved in artisanal mining, water siltation, erosion, and soil degradation can be an issue in rivers used for mining. Rivers are also commonly diverted as a way to access mineral rich riverbeds, or are clogged by mine tailing heaps.

The conservation of forests is also a great concern, as many artisanal mining operations take place in and around forests that are home to vast amounts of biodiversity. According to the African Union Development Agency, an estimated 90% of wood removed from African forests and woodlands is for fuel purposes, 29% of which is converted into charcoal. As the demand for green energy minerals increases, ASM settlements require cheap and readily accessible fuel sources for day-to-day use like heating and cooking. This reflects the poor state of energy grids in developing countries, many of which are supplying many critical minerals for the global transition towards renewable energy sources. Wood energy chains are essential in many informal economies, creating jobs for producers, transporters, traders, and sellers. One assessment indicates that almost three-quarters of active mining and exploratory sites overlap with areas of high conservation value and high watershed stress. It has also been reported that some mining operations also work within protected areas. The resulting ecological damage includes biodiversity loss, soil erosion and impoverishment, sediment and chemical buildup in waterways, poor water quality, reduced ecosystem services, and increased carbon emissions. Deforestation has contributed to the loss of carbon sinks. Artisanal mining operations often cut down trees to clear space for their camps, and it is common for miners to hunt, fish, and collect other forest resources for food and medicine, or as a way to supplement their income.

Many artisanal mining communities are under-resourced by government and state forces, in part because they operate informally and in remote areas of the world. Because of the lack of formal energy infrastructure, governments are often unable to meet the energy needs of ASM communities. Rare earth minerals are primarily used in the development of renewable energy sources, particularly solar and wind development and EVs. However, the benefits of the green energy transition are not available to miners who suffer the social and environmental consequences of resource extraction, creating global wealth and security disparities. With fewer government protections, ecosystem services also deteriorate and ASM camps must meet their energy needs through local sourcing for tasks like cooking and heating. It becomes harder for ASM communities to meet their basic needs as the quality of the surrounding natural resources diminishes.

Mercury contamination because of ASM has significant impacts on both human and wildlife health for ASM, particularly in gold mining, through either inhaling mercury gas, or eating flora and fauna contaminated with mercury. When mining for gold, mercury is commonly used to create a mixture of gold and mercury called amalgam that allows for easier gold separation. Once mercury and gold are combined to create amalgam, the amalgam is typically burned with a blowtorch or over an open flame to separate the mercury from the gold. Since gold mines are almost always set up near rivers, often excess chemicals are distributed directly into waterways. Once it becomes imbedded in soil or water, mercury becomes methylmercury that can easily accumulate in aquatic ecosystems through bioaccumulation and biomagnification, harming both the ecosystem and humans who fish from it.

According to the U.S. Environmental Protection Agency, the observed effects on animals exposed to high levels of methylmercury include mortality, reduced fertility, slower growth rates, and abnormal behavior that affects survival. Methylmercury can also cause adverse health effects in humans through prolonged exposure. For ASGM communities, exposure is primarily through inhalation of elemental mercury and consumption of contaminated fish, which have been linked to neurological symptoms, kidney disfunction, autoimmune dysfunction, and impaired cognitive function. Mercury exposure can also cause prenatal complications in pregnant women, most commonly including stunted cognitive ability, physical birth defects, and motor skill complications. Breastmilk can also become contaminated if the food and water supply have high mercury content. The amount of mercury produced is based on both the mining and processing methods used and the amount of material being extracted and processed.

=== Organized crime and militancy ===
Due to the migratory practices of many ASM workers, and the remoteness and lack of significant government oversight in ASM-dominated regions, ASM migrant workers are at particular risk of being controlled by organized crime groups that extort access to mines, especially when ASM is illegal in the given country. For example, in Gauteng and Mpumalanga Provinces, South Africa, migrant miners are coerced into giving local gangs, some highly militarized, a cut of their output in exchange for mineshaft access. In addition, ASM has sometimes been used as a source of financing for money laundering operations, or militant or terrorist groups, given that ASM operations often take place in remote areas with low government presence, such as in the case of blood diamonds.

=== Gender discrimination ===
Globally, an average of 30% of ASM workers are women. While this is a much higher percentage than the large-scale mining (LSM) sector, where less than 10% of mining employees are female, women engaged in ASM generally have reduced access to mining resources, including land, finance, and tools. Many female ASM workers continue to work at mining sites even while pregnant and nursing young children.

In addition, there is commonly a gendered division of labor between men and women engaged in ASM. Especially in settings involving mineshafts, men tend to handle the actual ore extraction while women tend to handle ore processing. This leads to women often being more exposed to more of the chemical hazards in the ASM process, including cyanide-based ore-processing and dust exposure from cleaning of tailings. Furthermore, the processing of ore can receive decreased wages compared with ore extraction, often leading to a gender pay gap between men and women engaged in ASM.

=== HIV/AIDS and prostitution ===
Due to the transient and unregulated nature of ASM, ASM camps often have high rates of prostitution, as many women especially who migrate to ASM locations have no other choice to make a living. As a result, the prevalence of HIV/AIDS is particularly high in ASM-based areas, especially in sub-Saharan Africa.

=== Data-sharing ===
Data on ASM is inadequate, which limits an understanding of the sector and appropriate policy measures. Collaborative and transparent knowledge-sharing, data collection, and analysis is required. Improved transparency through open databases can aid with collaborative and transparent knowledge-sharing, data collection, and analysis across governments, research and training institutions, the private sector, consultants, and civil society. High quality data tracking can help accurately understand the scope of ASM and its associated concerns.

The DELVE database project is establishing a global platform for ASM data. DELVE's vision is "a world in which artisanal and small-scale mining is recognized as an important contributor to global development". The platform collects, analyzes and shares data using open-source principles, which informs policy-making and interventions, and ultimately improves miners' lives. An annual ASM State of the Sector review summarizes what is known about the sector, including its scale, impact, and cost.

=== Inclusive finance and free trade ===
Partially due to ASM's status as part of the informal economy, ASM ventures often lack access to affordable and tailored financial products, which leads to stagnation, eventual abandonment of ASM business ventures, and contributes to the ASM poverty cycle.

Since ASM has also begun to be recognized as a crucial part of the global supply chain for critical minerals, some state actors have attempted to regulate the entry of ASM-sourced minerals into their markets. Part of the Dodd-Frank Act, passed by the United States Congress in 2010, required companies to disclose if their products used materials sourced from ASM operations in the Democratic Republic of the Congo or the Great Lakes region of central Africa. The Kimberley Process is a similar international attempt to prevent diamonds mined illegally in conflict zones in participating countries from entering the global market. Improving access to markets and financial products tailored to ASM including credit guarantees and private and public loan facilities, is critical to improving the sector's impact, resilience and sustainability.

=== Violence ===
Violence has emerged as an almost universal feature of ASM communities, often because of natural resource struggles, colonial histories in the regions where ASM proliferates, or power imbalances that have been exploited for capital gain. The lack of formal regulations in these communities allows for persistent conflict without repercussion. Corruption, war, ethnic conflict, inequality, and land use disputes are some of many causes of violence in cases of artisanal mining worldwide. Violence is harmful to the productivity of ASM and further damages the environment, especially as natural resources are strategically damaged or sabotaged. Mining opposition poses a threat to the economic prosperity, but the formalization of mining efforts and the implementation of safe, reliable mining methods may bolster economic output, reduce inequalities and violence, and promote wellbeing.

ASM can sometimes cause conflict between migrant workers and locals. For instance, artisanal mining has attracted a large number of Chinese migrant workers to Africa. In 2013, widespread conflict and violence between illegal Chinese artisanal mine workers and Ghanaian natives were reported. Ghanaian officials claimed tens of thousands of Chinese immigrants were working in illegal artisanal gold mines, damaging land, polluting drinking water, and destroying agricultural lands. This triggered violence and armed attacks between Chinese groups and local Ghanaian villagers, causing widespread unrest and deaths. By July 2013, Ghana had deported over 4,000 Chinese citizens working illegally in artisanal mines.

Anti-mining activists and artisanal miners who resist or speak out against the corporations and regimes that reinforce harsh working conditions are consistently suppressed through means of violence and intimidation. For example, in Peru, instances of violence have been reported against Indigenous Awajún communities. Political leaders who resist mining activity have reported direct intimidation, including threats, confinement, and destruction of property. Armed groups monitor artisanal mining operations closely to ensure productivity and increased profit. Violence has also been reported against women in cases of sexual exploitation, which continues to be underreported in many ASM communities. Additionally, environmental destruction creates tension between groups competing for the same natural resources. In the Pataz region, crime has led to attacks on mining sites and key infrastructure. Combatting this violence has proven difficult due to limited financial and organizational capacity on behalf of the Peruvian government.

In Indonesia, violence has emerged through conflict between the government and ASM communities. Government forces combat illegal mining practices through forced shutdowns of mining activity and theft of mine sites and goods. Similarly, conflict can be seen because of competing mining operations. Smaller, informal operations and licensed mining operations alike report high amounts of conflict in Indonesia, often because of illegal ASM taking place near larger mining sites. Larger, licensed operations often displace illegal ASM miners to retain access to mineral-rich areas through complacency with mining regulations, creating conflict between companies and local communities. Additionally, the lack of established geographic boundaries within ASM communities has caused tension and conflict at the border of Indonesia and Papua New Guinea, particularly regarding the emboldening Free Papua Movement. Indonesia has historically been accused of violence against Papuan women and indigenous inhabitants. The rebel West Papua Liberation Army has targeted those believed to be Indonesian troops disguised as gold miners.

== Organizations ==
=== Pact Mines to Markets (M2M) ===
Pact is a nonprofit international development organization founded in 1971, working on the ground in nearly 40 countries to improve the lives of those who are challenged by poverty and marginalization. Pact's "Mines to Markets" program (M2M) uses an integrated, holistic approach to help resource-dependent communities improve their lives. Specializing in areas including health and safety in mining, human rights, traceability and transparency, economic empowerment among miners, mercury abatement, child labor reduction, mineral certification and ethical sourcing, it helps communities gain lasting benefit from natural resources by using them more sustainably. It also improves governance in the countries where it works, strengthening local, regional and national institutions.

M2M programs currently operate in 12 countries, 10 of which are in Africa.

=== The Artisanal Gold Council ===
The Artisanal Gold Council (AGC), based in Victoria, British Columbia, is a not-for-profit organization dedicated to improving the opportunities, environment and health of the millions of people involved in the artisanal gold mining sector in over 80 countries worldwide. It is focused on professionalizing the sector so that ASM operations can adopt socially responsible and environmentally sound methods of mining and gold processing. There is a focus on professionalization because it drives many improvements including allowing more wealth to be generated, and more of the wealth to be captured at the local level and re-invested in the development of its people and their needs.

The AGC accomplishes their goals of professionalization through four main approaches: teaching and delivering improved practices to miners in the field; working with governments to creating enabling policy frameworks that support the development of artisanal miners; creating sustainable markets and sustainable finance mechanisms for artisanal miners and their products; and creating and sharing knowledge about the sector (R&D and outreach).

At field sites, by focusing on methodologies that forego the use of mercury and other toxic chemicals, the ACG helps miners and their communities to work and live in a safer and healthier environment, and responsibly produce gold. Under those conditions, the sector can play a vital role in relieving poverty, generating inclusive and sustainable economic growth, and creating full and productive employment and decent work. The AGC has experience in more than 25 countries and, as of 2018, had active projects in 12 countries: Peru, Mongolia, Myanmar, Indonesia, Laos, Burkina Faso, Mali, Senegal, Gabon, Ecuador, Papua New Guinea, the Philippines, and Mozambique. An important focus of the AGC is to help countries fulfill their obligations under the Minamata Convention on Mercury (to eliminate the use of mercury by the artisanal mining sector) by working with governments to develop National Action Plans (NAPs) and to pilot concrete field models that can be replicated to greater and greater numbers of artisanal mining communities.

=== The Alliance for Responsible Mining ===
The Alliance for Responsible Mining (ARM) is an independent, mission-driven initiative that supports artisanal and small-scale (ASM) miners globally. Established in 2004, the organization's mission is to enhance social and economic wellbeing, strengthen environmental protection and establish fair governance in ASM communities by formalizing the ASM sector. In 2009, ARM created an exceptional set of social and environmental standards known as the Fairmined certification, aimed at bolstering the "global effort to transform artisanal and small-scale gold mining into a dignified and responsible activity. ARM offers extensive and continuous support and training to ASM communities to help them reach Fairmined standards, become certified, and invest in community development. Furthermore, ARM serves as an intermediary for ASM communities, which gives them the opportunity to respond to international markets demanding ethical metals and jewelry. ARM has facilitated the positive transformation of multiple ASM communities in Latin America and is currently expanding its efforts to Africa and Asia.

=== Collaborative group on Artisanal and Small-Scale Mining (CASM) ===
CASM is a global networking and coordination facility with a stated mission "to reduce poverty by improving the environmental, social and economic performance of artisanal and small-scale mining in developing countries". CASM is currently chaired by the UK's Department for International Development and is housed at the World Bank headquarters in Washington, D.C.

Resourced by a multi-donor trust fund, CASM receives its core funding from the UK and the World Bank, supplemented by program support from Japan, amongst others, Canada, France and the US. Several companies, trade associations and charitable funds, such as Tiffany & Co Foundation, also contribute finances to CASM's work program. CASM funding has leveraged significant additional funding for work in the ASM sector.

In 2008, CASM produced a report on Mineral Certification. This report discussed the opportunity of using certification of origin and certification of ethical quality to stimulate sustainable development in artisanal mining communities.

=== International Program on the Elimination of Child Labour ===
The International Programme on the Elimination of Child Labour, a program of the International Labour Organization (ILO), includes a sector of activity in "Mining and Quarrying". It notes that child labour "can still be seen in small-scale mines of Asia, Africa, Latin America, and even parts of Europe". The program approach focuses particularly on the development of a solid knowledge base and assessment, and working with partners for delivery of programs.

=== ICMM "Working Together" ===
A significant issue in artisanal and small-scale arises when larger mining companies gain rights to develop deposits that are worked by artisanal mining. The International Council on Mining and Metals (ICMM) has produced a guidance note for companies engaging with the artisanal and small-scale mining (ASM) sector. As is noted in the introduction to this document "The fact that much of ASM activity occurs outside regulatory frameworks – whether illegal or not – can also present significant challenges for companies and regulators. There can be significant tension between ASM miners and their own governments – with companies caught in the middle."

The guidance document, which is put forward as a pilot was produced in partnership with Communities and Small-Scale Mining, the International Finance Corporation's Oil, Gas, and Mining Sustainable Community Development Fund and ICMM.

=== International Conference on Artisanal and Small-Scale Mining and Quarrying ===
In September 2018, over 500 delegates from more than 70 countries gathered in Livingstone, Zambia for the International Conference on Artisanal and Small-Scale Mining and Quarrying. The potential of the sector was discussed in 36 workshops, highlighting ASM's ability to reduce poverty, interlock with agricultural livelihoods, and stimulate jobs, markets and wealth creation in rural communities, as well as national economic growth through taxation and exports of raw and value-added minerals. A key output was the signing of the Mosi-oa-Tunya Declaration on ASM and Quarrying, which reaffirms the central role of ASM for "enhanced livelihoods, employment creation, poverty reduction and sustainable development". As one delegate said of the conference: "Making these visions a reality will take time, and much change still needs to happen at all levels of governance in the process of formalization. But with the voices of artisanal and small-scale miners finally engaged in international policy dialogues, and especially those of women, there is hope that in five years' time, a formalized, government-supported and socially, economically and environmentally productive ASM sector will have started to emerge."

== Country-specific ==
=== Angola ===
The primary minerals mined through ASM in Angola are diamonds, in addition to other minerals. Diamond ASM occurs mostly in the northeast part of Angola, in Lunda Norte and Lunda Sul provinces. In Angola, ASM is legal and permits have been granted to operate ASM in areas not dominated by hydrocarbon extraction.

=== Burkina Faso ===
Gold is the primary ASM mineral mined in Burkina Faso. Gold ASM mostly occurs in the northern provinces of the country. It is an important supplier of both local and government revenue. However, it has also had significant environmental effects on agricultural areas converted to farmland, and has taken some children away from schooling.

=== Cape Verde ===
The primary minerals mined by ASM in Cape Verde are development minerals used for local construction. Given the archipelagic nature of the country, some types of ASM are considered to be potentially dangerous for the ecosystem, such as sand mining. Such sand mining is currently illegal in Cape Verde.

=== Central African Republic ===
The primary minerals mined in the Central African Republic (CAR) are gold and diamonds. ASM mostly occurs in the far west and the east of the country, such as in Haute-Kotto and Mambéré-Kadéï prefectures.

=== Chad ===
The primary ASM minerals mined in Chad are gold and natron. Since 2012–2013, there has been a gold rush in the northern regions of Chad, mostly in the Tibesti region. Miners have consisted of both international and Chadian migrants. ASM is currently legal in Chad.

=== Côte d'Ivoire ===
The primary ASM minerals mined in Côte d'Ivoire are gold, nickel, coltan, and diamonds, with gold being the fastest-growing exported mineral. The state is in the process of supporting ASM formalization, and has taken steps to reduce mercury contamination among miners.

=== Democratic Republic of the Congo ===
The primary ASM minerals mined in the Democratic Republic of the Congo (DRC) are copper, cobalt, diamonds, gold, and coltan. Currently, ASM is illegal in the DRC. Much of the mining occurs within the historical Katanga region of south-east DRC. Cobalt ASM in the Katanga region is particularly prominent, as 50% of the world's cobalt production is sourced from this region. 30% of the cobalt from the DRC is estimated to be from ASM mines. An estimated 150,000 to 200,000 artisanal miners currently work in cobalt mines in the Democratic Republic of the Congo. Due to the risks of mining cobalt, many of these miners suffer serious injury or death with an estimated 2,000 miners dying each year in the DRC alone. The lack of regulations makes for hazardous conditions, where many of these miners die from frequent cave-ins or avalanches.

The cobalt ASM economy, driven by the surge in demand for the metal due to increased manufacturing of lithium-ion batteries, has resulted in both alleged human rights abuses and environmental health impacts for people living in the region. Regarding environmental health, a study in the city of Kolwezi indicated above-recommended-level amounts of heavy metals such as cobalt, manganese, and uranium in the surrounding environment, both in the soil and human tissue of residents.

Regarding human rights abuses, the south-eastern DRC has been a site of conflict since the Katanga Insurgency began in 1963, and the mineral wealth of the region provides ample funds for armed actors (both state- and non-state) to finance their operations, particularly enabled by ASM's informal nature. Violence, especially sexual violence, has been a widespread tactic used by groups in order to maintain control of ASM operations.

Efforts to address artisanal mining have involved collaboration between the United States and Congolese governments. The US has trained representatives from both the private and public sectors to identify and combat child labour. They have established the Child Labor Monitoring and Remediation System (CLMRS). As of March 2024, 5,346 children have been registered to the CLMRS, which is overseen by the Democratic Republic of the Congo's Ministry of Mines.

=== Egypt ===
The primary ASM mineral mined in Egypt is gold, mostly in the Eastern Desert. Though environmental degradation is a low risk in arid regions, where most of Egypt's ASM occurs, mercury contamination is still a risk for the health of ASM workers. Currently, there are no large-scale plans by the Egyptian state to formalize and integrate ASM.

=== Eritrea ===
The primary ASM mineral mined in Eritrea is orogenic gold, as well as volcanogenic massive sulfide ore deposits. Currently, ASM is illegal in Eritrea, but it directly supports around 400,000 Eritreans.

=== Eswatini ===
The primary ASM minerals mined in Eswatini are development minerals, such as gravel, sand, and dimension stones. Currently, ASM is legal for citizens of Eswatini, and permits can be obtained. In addition, many Swazi emigrate to South Africa's Gauteng and Mpumalanga Provinces to participate in ASM.

=== Ethiopia ===
The primary ASM mineral mined in Ethiopia is gold, mostly in the Tigray region. Gold ASM has resulted in some deforestation in the region as farmland and forest have been converted to mining land use. The ASM sector currently is unformalized and faces significant barriers to receiving government support.

=== Ghana ===
The main forms of ASM in Ghana are gold, diamonds, and sand mining. ASM represents a significant contribution to the country's GDP, with over 1 million Ghanaians participating directly. Ghana is also the largest gold producer in Africa. The government of Ghana has begun processes to completely formalize ASM and fully integrate it with the large-scale mining sector, particularly with the focus of giving strength to the voices of miners.

In Ghana, the regulation of artisanal gold mining is set forth in the Small-Scale Gold Mining Law, 1989 (PNDCL 218). The Precious Minerals Marketing Corporation Law, 1989 (PNDCL 219), set up the Precious Minerals Marketing Corporation (PMMC) to promote the development of small-scale gold and diamond mining in Ghana and to purchase the output of such mining, either directly or through licensed buyers.

=== Guinea ===
The main ASM minerals mined in Guinea are gold and diamonds. Small-scale mining is currently legal in Guinea, though artisanal mining is unlicensed. Mercury contamination occurring in ASM-based areas is a particular environmental concern. The ASM industry supports around 300,000 Guineans directly.

=== Kenya ===
The main ASM minerals mined in Kenya are gold, gemstones, and development minerals. Over 250,000 Kenyans are directly employed in the ASM sector. The Mining Act of 2016 allows for licenses to mine in Kenya, but artisanal miners work independently as a result, and therefore ASM is de facto illegal in Kenya. In addition, Kenya's proximity to Ethiopia and Tanzania makes it a prime target for mineral smuggling.

=== Lesotho ===
The primary ASM minerals mined in Lesotho are diamonds. Though miners from Lesotho have historically ended up migrating to South Africa to work in that country's artisanal mines, many also return with expertise gained to mines in Lesotho. Despite this, ASM is illegal in the country.

=== Liberia ===
The main ASM minerals mined in Liberia are gold and diamonds. Specifically, gold ASM is more likely to be informal than diamond ASM, due to diamond mines' proximity to populated areas. During the Second Liberian Civil War, Charles Taylor extorted diamonds from ASM operations to fund his military operations against his rivals. In response, the United Nations placed sanctions on Liberian diamond exports. After Taylor was deposed in 2003, in return for the lifting of sanctions, the Liberian government started the process of formalizing the ASM diamond sector. Currently, the ASM sector directly employs around 100,000 Liberians.

=== Madagascar ===
The main ASM minerals mined in Madagascar are gold and colored gemstones such as mica and sapphires. ASM is legal, however, miners have little incentive to acquire licenses and formalize. As of 2022, the ASM sector directly employs around 500,000 Malagasy.

=== Malawi ===
The main ASM minerals mined in Malawi are colored gemstones, coal, clay, and some small gold deposits. As per the Mines and Minerals Act of 1981, which was amended in 2023, ASM is legal in Malawi, and ASM operations must seek permits from the state in order to extract minerals, which also mandates that ASM operations follow environmental and occupational health standards in exchange for royalties and cost-sharing. State organizations, such as the Geological Survey Department of Malawi, also work with miner organizations such as the Malawi Artisanal and Small-scale Mining Association to support ASM operations. At the same time, ASM operations have led to significant alluvial erosion and destruction of habitats for species. Currently, the ASM sector directly employs around 40,000 Malawians.

=== Mali ===
The main ASM mineral mined in Mali is gold, with Mali being the 3rd largest gold-producer in Africa. Mali is also unique in that unlike many of its neighbors, ASM is currently legal in Mali, which has acted as a centripetal force drawing migrants to the region. Currently, the ASM sector directly employs around 400,000 Malians.

ASM, especially for gold, has a long historical legacy in Mali, and is not merely the product of recent economic trends. Some communities in southern Mali have developed organized community-based methods of gold distribution to accommodate this revenue, though this does not ensure a monopoly over gold production for local Malians, and less regulated ASM is still practiced.

=== Mozambique ===
The main ASM minerals mined in Mozambique are colored gemstones and gold. ASM is technically legal in Mozambique, but licensed ASM is limited to specific areas by the state, so many informal ASM operations still exist, particularly in Cabo Delgado, Manica, Nampula, Niassa, Tete, and Zambézia provinces. ASM in Mozambique has led to significant heavy metal pollution and river erosion. Currently, the ASM sector directly employs around 100,000 Mozambicans.

=== Niger ===
The main ASM mineral mined in Niger is gold, with smaller amounts of tin and gemstones, scattered throughout the country. ASM is legal in Niger but is often unregulated. As of 2022, the ASM sector directly employs around 450,000 Nigeriens.

=== Nigeria ===
Nigeria's mineral extraction regime is dominated by hydrocarbons, however, some ASM does occur in the country, mainly gold with some activity in coltan, lead, zinc, and (historically) tin. In fact, most of the raw metal output in Nigeria is due to ASM. As of 2022, the ASM sector employs around 2 million Nigerians, though it is unformalized.

=== Peru ===
Peru's government passed legislation in 2002 which aimed to formalize and promote artisanal gold mining activity, seen as a "great source of employment and collateral benefits." Formalization recognized the economic impact that ASM has on anywhere from 100,000 to 500,000 miners employed in the informal mining sector. Growing political recognition of formalization efforts may advance their methods for higher potential future successes. The main goals of formalization included improving working conditions, bettering the quality of miners' livelihood, and mitigating environmental impacts. Mercury exposure and biodiversity loss are two of the main environmental challenges that Peru's government aimed to address through formalization.

Despite this legislative commitment, the complexities involved in formalization efforts have seen subsequent governments shy away from such initiatives. Authorities charged with implementing the legislation and regulating the activity, lack the finance and personnel necessary to carry out such tasks effectively. La Rinconada, Peru, the site of the highest elevation human habitation in the world, in the Andes on the border with Bolivia, is one site of extensive artisanal mining.

Illegal land use and violent conflict persist in many areas, and estimates indicate that 70-80% of the mining sector continues to operate informally. Formalization proved difficult for artisanal and small-scale miners who were not accustomed to the large-scale, mechanized methods of mining that the government financed. Operating complicated machinery involves training and documentation that spans beyond what many artisanal miners are familiar with. Often, miners are discouraged from engaging in the formalization process because of the many challenges that may create a buffer in the flow of income profited from ASM. Often, the formalization process incurs high costs and fees that dissuade miners from applying. Excessive delays, lack of clarity, and shifting political ideals limited the government's capacity to sustain formalization efforts. Often, the remote location of mining sites makes compliance and oversight difficult, especially when coupled with other bureaucratic challenges.

Additionally, formalization has not proved to successfully address environmental concerns. With the rise of formalization, the perceived risks of mining operations lessened, and an influx of new mining sites emerged. Preservation of biodiversity and forestry was not realized by formalization, in part because enforcement is plagued by reports of corruption and in part because overlapping land and agricultural claims make it difficult to delineate in which contexts environmental protections apply. This tension increased the magnitude of mining operations in buffer zones and Indigenous communities. Additionally, it is unclear whether formalization prevented the start of new informal mining operations or if existing ASM operations have continued to grow to work outside of the government. The formalization effort took place on the basis of stringent land policies that were poorly enforced or ineffective.

=== Philippines ===
According to the International Labour Organization small-scale or artisanal gold mining accounts for as much as 80 per cent of gold production in the Philippines. As of 2017, artisanal mines are estimated to employ around 350,000 workers, of which 18,000 are women and children. Compressor mining, a hazardous mining method where ore is extracted by divers in flooded, narrow shafts while breathing through an air tube connected to makeshift compressor, was banned in the Philippines in 2012. Enforcement is however lax and this mining extraction method remains prevalent in the province of Camarines Norte, notably around the towns of Santa Milagrosa and Paracale.

=== Sierra Leone ===
The main ASM minerals mined in Sierra Leone are diamonds, gold, and coltan. Of these, diamonds are especially prominent, with Sierra Leone's ASM operations contributing most of the country's diamond exports, with overall ASM supporting 150,000 Sierra Leoneans. Mercury contamination due to the use of amalgam is a primary environmental and health concern. Currently, ASM is legal in Sierra Leone.

=== South Africa ===
==== History of large-scale mining in South Africa ====
Historically, both small- and large-scale mining have been one of the most important parts of South Africa's economy, particularly gold, diamond, and uranium. As large-scale mining first began in the 1880s, South African mining companies took advantage of low wages to black migrant workers, especially from Lesotho, to cheaply extract and process ore to increase company profit. After the National Party rose to power, the mining industry was linked with the apartheid regime's racial segregation. For instance, in Johannesburg metropolitan area, which is proximate to the gold-rich Witwatersrand reef, white South African areas were placed upwind of airborne uranium dust pollution from tailings piles, while black South Africans in Soweto township were placed in areas downwind of large-scale uranium and gold mines.

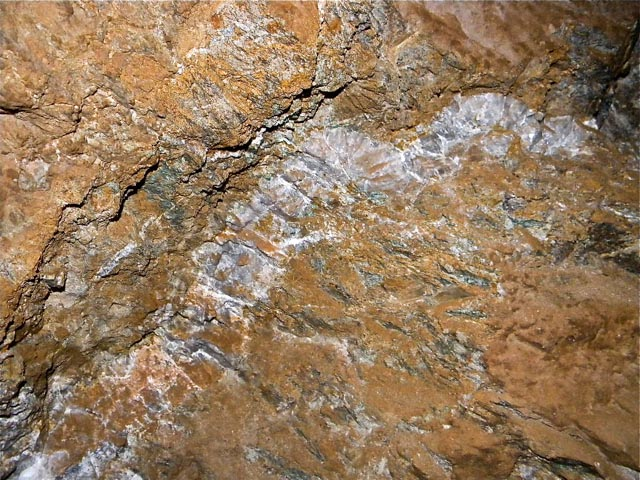
Gold-beading quartz vein in interior of an artisanal mine near Low's Creek, Mpumalanga Province, South Africa, showing chisel marks from hand-driven chisels in working the mine.

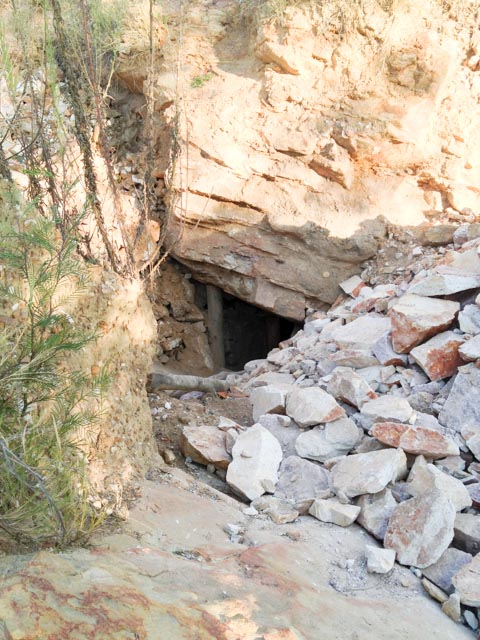
This is an adit (horizontal or sloping mine entrance) in the Johannesburg municipality, near the suburb of Roodepoort. It is part of a chain of similar adits along a surface outcrop of the Roodepoort gold reef of the Witwatersrand, South Africa.

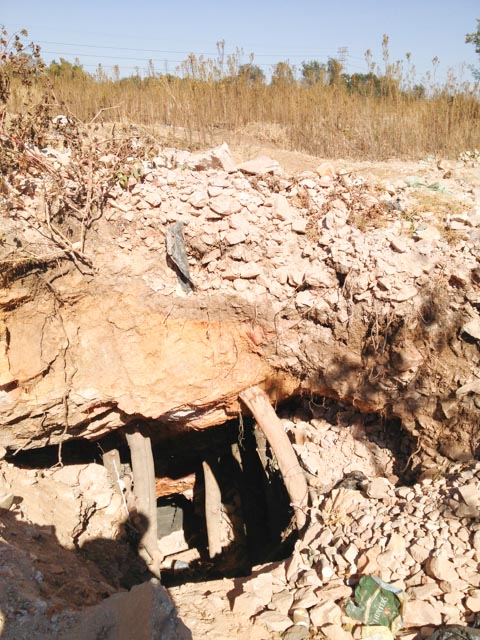
This is an adit (horizontal or sloping mine entrance) in the Johannesburg municipality, near the suburb of Roodepoort. It is part of a chain of similar adits along a surface outcrop of the Roodepoort gold reef of the Witwatersrand, South Africa.

==== Growth of South African ASM ====
As the price of gold grew on international markets from the 1970s to the 1990s, formal large-scale mining in South Africa shed jobs, while labour unrest and strikes led to increasing layoffs of mine workers on the large mines, leading to the closure or consolidation of South Africa's large-scale mining firms. South African mines were largely abandoned by mining companies, who initially refused to invest the capital in mine closures or tailings cleanup. As a result, gold deposits in particular began to be exploited by artisanal miners known as zamazama (isiZulu, lit. 'try-try', meaning 'try and try again' or 'don't give up' due to the low success rate of these miners).

The zamazama may live underground for many weeks, while collecting sufficient quantities of high-grade ore for further processing. Most zamazama are properly artisanal, opening adits and driving shafts and tunnels using hand tools such as hammers, chisels and spades. They train each other and typically have little or no formal mining experience. Conditions are dangerous, with zamazama facing risk of mineshaft collapse, dehydration, phthisis, and risks associated with uranium and radon dust inhalation.

Once extracted, the gold ore is processed informally using simple technologies. Ore is first crushed by hand on open rock surface and hammerstones. This work is often done by women and children. The pulverised ore is concentrated using visual sorting, sieving, gold panning, and by washing on riffle tables made of plastic sheets on heaps of sand. Final gold extraction is accomplished using mercury amalgamation. Mercury is typically burned off using an oxy-gas torch. The gold is sold to local agents, or may be exported directly to major markets for raw gold including India, China, Israel and Lebanon. Gold is also taken across borders into Zimbabwe and Botswana where legislation makes it easier to sell the gold to small refineries and small mining operations, where it may be incorporated into their own output for reporting purposes.

==== Violence and organized crime ====
According to the Mineral and Petroleum Resources Development Act of 2002, only large, fully registered, capital intensive industry may prospect for, mine and process minerals. Due to the illegal nature of ASM, violence is of particular concern to South African ASM operations. This is often caused by conflict between miners and police or private security personnel, and between different groups of miners competing for resources.

Furthermore, organized crime is a major player in the South African ASM sector. Many zamazama, due to being migrant laborers, are vulnerable to extortion by heavily armed organized crime groups, such as the Marashea gang. Gangs control access to mineshafts, food supplies, and gold wholesalers, and miners must give up most of the profits from their sales to the gangs. Many of the gangs are so powerful that even the mining companies that formally own the mines cannot evict them.

=== South Sudan ===
The main ASM mineral mined in South Sudan is gold. Currently, ASM comprises the entirety of South Sudan's mining sector, and though it is technically possible to obtain a license, it is not common for ASM actors to do so, with much of South Sudan's output smuggled to other countries. Significant environmental impacts include deforestation and erosion. As of 2022, ASM directly employs 200,000 South Sudanese.

=== Sudan ===
The primary ASM mineral mined in Sudan is gold, with most miners being migrants. Almost all of Sudan's gold is smuggled out of the country by foreign actors such as the Wagner Group, a Russian private military contractor, which has been accused of smuggling Sudanese gold out of the country to fund its own operations. Since the beginning of the 2023 civil war in Sudan, many ASM operations are controlled by the Rapid Support Forces (RSF), with miners being forced to extract gold to fund the group's operations.

=== Tanzania ===
ASM in Tanzania targets a wide variety of minerals, including gemstones, gold, lithium, iron, silver, copper, tin, coal, and various development minerals. After the rollout of the Tanzania Mineral Policy of 2009, ASM was legalized and the state began making efforts to issue licenses and formalize the sector. As of 2022, ASM directly employs 1.5 million Tanzanians.

=== Uganda ===
The main ASM mineral mined in Uganda is gold, with some coltan and development mineral activity. ASM provides a disproportionate share of Uganda's economy, with only a little over 200,000 Ugandans directly employed in ASM contributing 3.5% of the country's GDP in 2022. ASM is legal in Uganda and is in the process of receiving government support and formalization.

=== Zambia ===
The main ASM minerals mined in Zambia are gemstones and, more recently, gold. After a gold rush beginning in the 2010s, gold ASM has increased drastically in the Eastern Province, Lusaka Province, and Southern Province. Much of this gold was smuggled out of the country. Since 2017, the Zambian government has begun formalization efforts, with some success in attracting foreign investment. However, most Zambian ASM operations are still informal.

=== Zimbabwe ===
The main ASM minerals mined in Zimbabwe are diamonds, gold, and colored gemstones. Currently, ASM is de facto illegal in Zimbabwe, given the high cost of obtaining a license, but the sector nevertheless employs around 500,000 Zimbabweans. Illegal miners in Zimbabwe are known as makorokoza. The region now encompassing Zimbabwe has a long historical legacy of ASM before European colonization, since the migration of Bantu-speaking peoples to the region. In addition, mineral wealth of the area is hypothesized to have been used by the Great Zimbabwe society to support the local economy.

== See also ==
- Bootleg mining
- Illegal mining
- Pallaqueo
- Pirquinero
- Ninja miner
