= Sumber =

Sumber may refer to:

- Sumber, Cirebon, a district in West Java, Indonesia
- Šumber, a village and castle in Istria, Croatia
- Sümber (disambiguation), a Mongolian toponym
