= Chinese people in Ghana =

Ethnic Chinese who live in Ghana

Total population
- Various speculative estimates, 7,000

Regions with significant populations
- Accra, Kumasi, Tema, Sekondi-Takoradi

Languages
- Mainly Mandarin; Cantonese; English; French; Akan; Twi; Others

Chinese people in Ghana

Chinese name
- Traditional Chinese: 加納華人
- Simplified Chinese: 加纳华人
Transcriptions
Standard Mandarin
- Hanyu Pinyin: Jiānà Huárén

French name
- French: Sino-Ghanéens

Akan name
- Akan: Nkɔmbɔtwetwe; China Gaana

Migration of Chinese people in Ghana dates back to the 1940s. Originally, most came from Hong Kong; migration from mainland China began only in the 1980s.

== Migration history ==
The earliest ethnic Chinese migrants to Ghana were of Hong Kong origin. They began arriving in the late 1940s and early 1950s, when both territories were still part of the British Empire. These sojourners stayed in Ghana for periods ranging from a few years to several decades, but they never came to consider Ghana their home. The migrants consisted largely of men who came to Ghana alone and worked as employees in Chinese-owned factories, while their families remained behind in Hong Kong. Originally, they were concentrated in western Ghana, but after Ghana achieved independence, the Kwame Nkrumah government began implementing plans to promote development in the eastern part of the country, and as a result, they began moving towards Accra and Tema.

Aside from individual migrants, there was also an official contingent from the People's Republic of China (PRC) for a brief period in the 1960s. The PRC provided a variety of military assistance to Ghana in the 1960s, including a loan for an arms factory in 1962 (which was never constructed) and the dispatch of military advisors in 1964. After the 1966 coup which overthrew Nkrumah's government, Ghana expelled 430 PRC nationals, including three intelligence officers and thirteen guerrilla warfare specialists.

In the late 1960s and early 1970s, some of the Hong Kong migrants began to bring their wives and children over to Ghana. Migrants from Shanghai also began to arrive round this time. Due to further political unrest in the 1970s and 1980s, including two coups by Jerry Rawlings, many of the Chinese migrants returned to Hong Kong. However, with the economic reform and opening up in the PRC, migrants from mainland China began arriving just as the Hong Kong migrants were flowing out. Migration from mainland China intensified in the 1990s; some came as employees, but most were independent traders running import-export businesses or restaurants. The sources of migration have also expanded; whereas earlier migrants came mostly from Hong Kong or Shanghai, later Chinese migrants have arrived from Guangdong and Henan as well as Taiwan.

== Business and employment ==
The earliest Hong Kong migrants were employed in a variety of industries in Ghana, including a failed tobacco-growing venture, a factory in Takoradi producing cooking implements, and imitation wax print clothing. The owners of these ventures rarely visited Ghana. In the 1990s and 2000s, large Chinese companies became active in Ghana's construction sector, while individual Chinese traders gained a large amount of influence in retailing of textiles, electrical appliances, and daily-use goods. Under the Ghana Investment Promotion Act of 1994, any foreigner can open a retail business with an investment of US$300,000, as long as it employs 10 local citizens, subject to maintenance of a certain minimum volume of trade. More recently, other Chinese are engaged in small-scale gold mining, as well as providing funding and heavy equipment to other miners.

== Integration and community ==
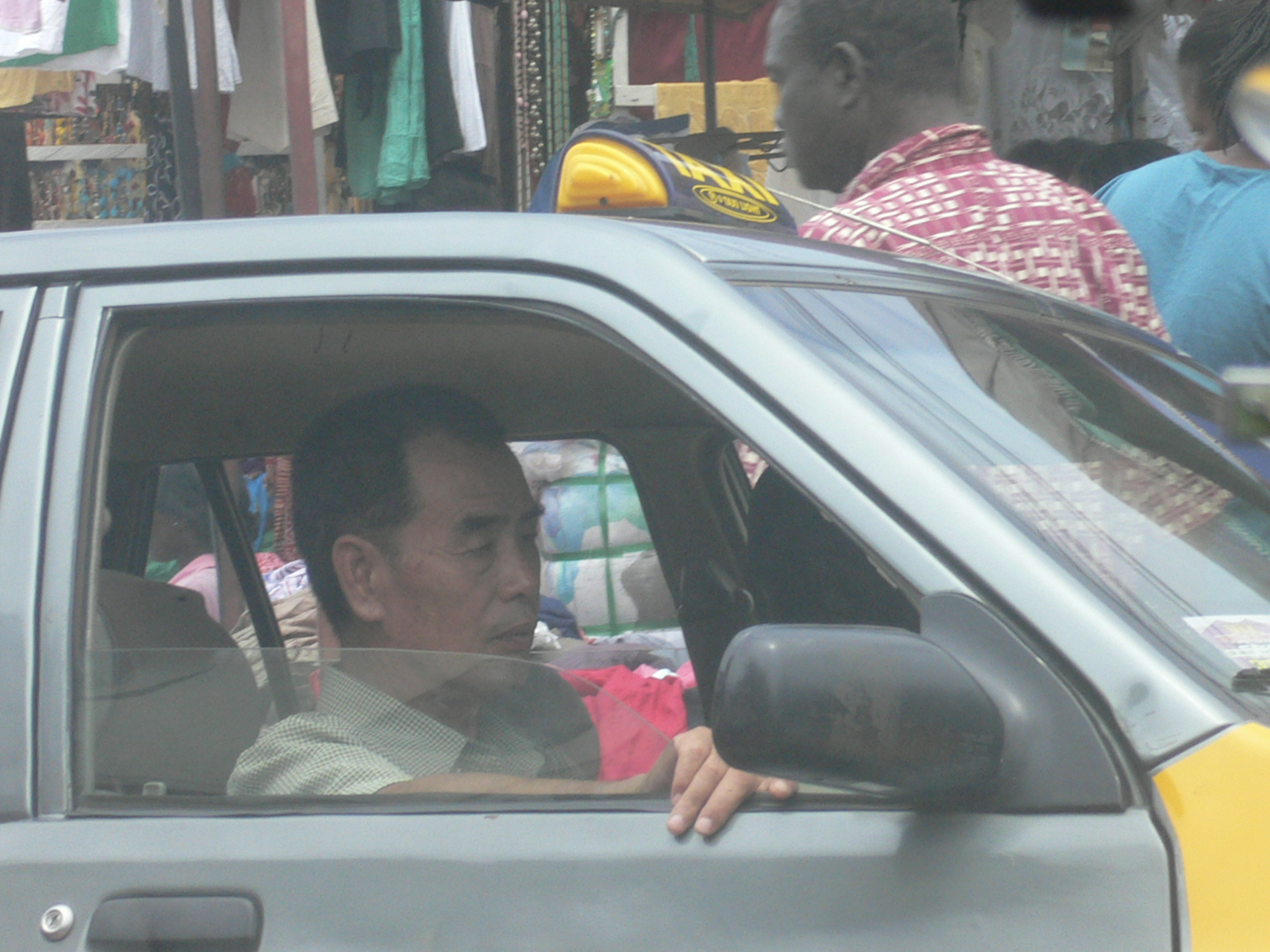
Chinese taking taxi in Ghana

The Chinese population in Ghana itself are largely transitory, and there is some resistance among them to the idea that they belong to a "community". Most of the migrants came with the intention of seeing the world and making money, rather than settling down in Ghana. In order to obtain Ghanaian nationality, one must be married to a citizen of Ghana or be able to speak and understand one of the indigenous languages of Ghana. The Chinese who have lived in Ghana for most of their lives have acquired Ghanaian citizenship, which is granted without any discrimination.

Local traders have protested against the influx of Chinese traders selling imported goods, and accuse them of breaking investment laws. In late 2007, local traders organised protests in Accra which accused the Chinese of unfair competition and trading in fields for which they were not qualified. In turn, Chinese migrants complain of arbitrary treatment by Ghana's police. On one day in February 2009, officers of the Immigration Department arrested over 100 Chinese people in a single day, due to Chinese engagement in illegal gold mining; in response, forty-one Chinese businesspeople signed an open letter of protest to the Immigration Department. They attributed the sudden crackdown to the government's desire to protect local merchants in the face of the worsening economy.

== See also ==
- Ghanaian people
- China–Ghana relations
- Chinatowns in Africa
