= Yeröö =

District in Selenge Province, Mongolia

Coordinates: 49°44′35″N 106°40′00″E

Yeröö District Ерөө сум ᠶ᠋ᠢᠷᠦᠭᠡᠰᠤᠮᠤ
- District
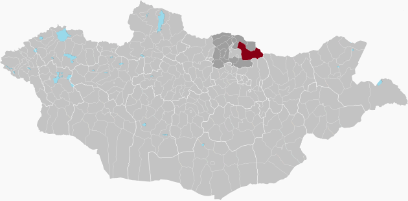
- Location of Yeröö in Selenge Province
- Country: Mongolia
- Province: Selenge Province

Area
  - Total: 8,203.51 km^{2} (3,167.39 sq mi)
- Time zone: UTC+8 (UTC + 8)

Yeröö (Mongolian: Ерөө "Augury") is a sum (district) of Selenge Province in northern Mongolia. Bugant urban-type settlement is 66 km SE from Yeröö sum center. In 2008, its population was 5,792.

== Administrative divisions ==
The district is divided into three bags, which are:

- Bugant
- Buuragchin
- Tavin
