= Sümber, Töv =

District in Töv, Mongolia

Coordinates: 48°48′10″N 105°55′28″E

Sümber District Сүмбэр сум ᠰᠦᠮᠪᠦᠷᠰᠤᠮᠤ
- District
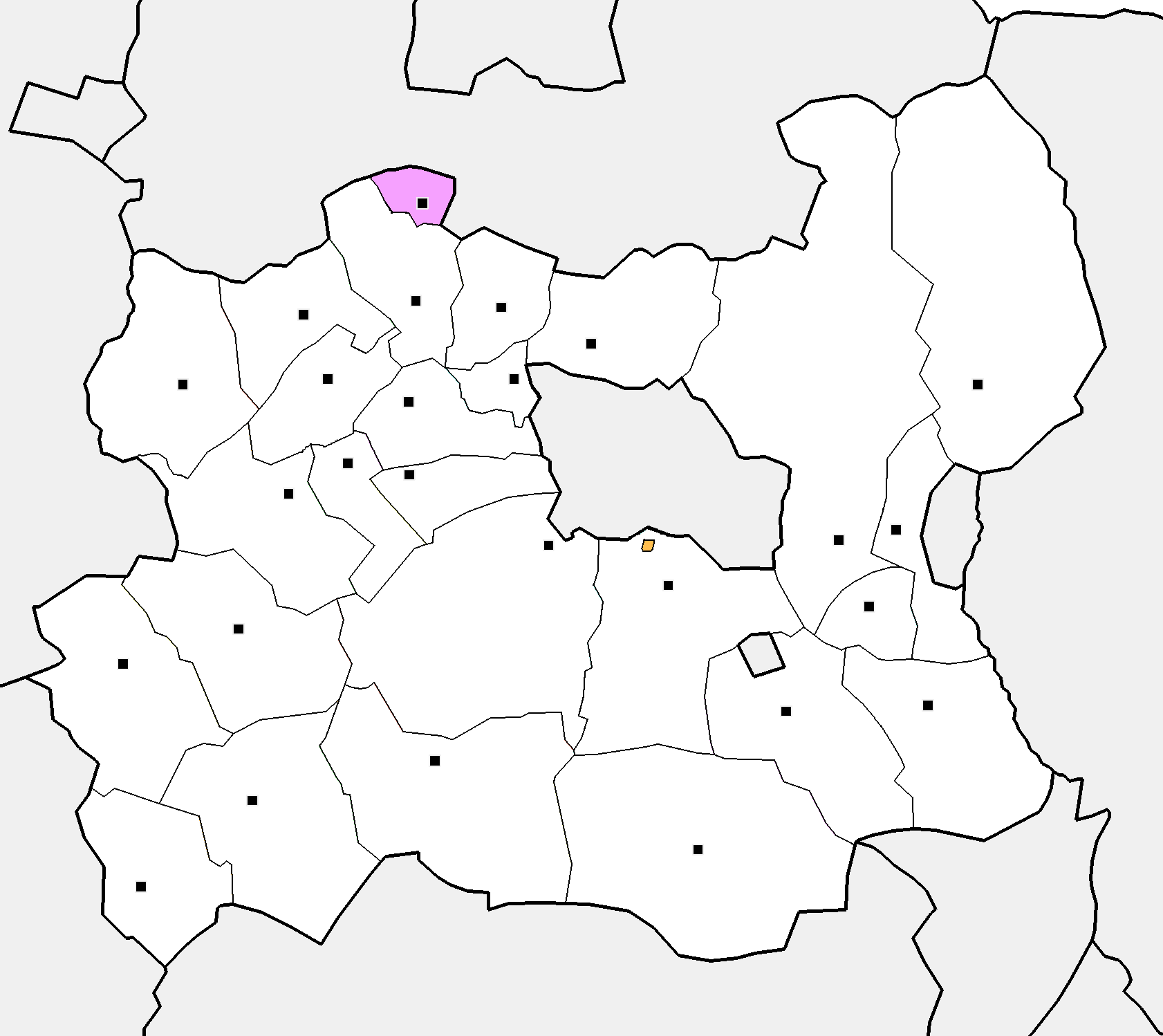
- Country: Mongolia
- Province: Töv Province
- Time zone: UTC+8 (UTC + 8)

Sümber (Mongolian: Сүмбэр, also Javkhlant) is a sum of Töv Province in Mongolia. It is named after Mount Meru, the sacred mountain in Buddhist cosmology.

== Geography ==
Sümber has a total area of 423 km^{2} (163 sq mi).

== Administrative divisions ==
The district is divided into two bags, which are:

- Javkhlant
- Sumber
