= List of Bible translations by language =

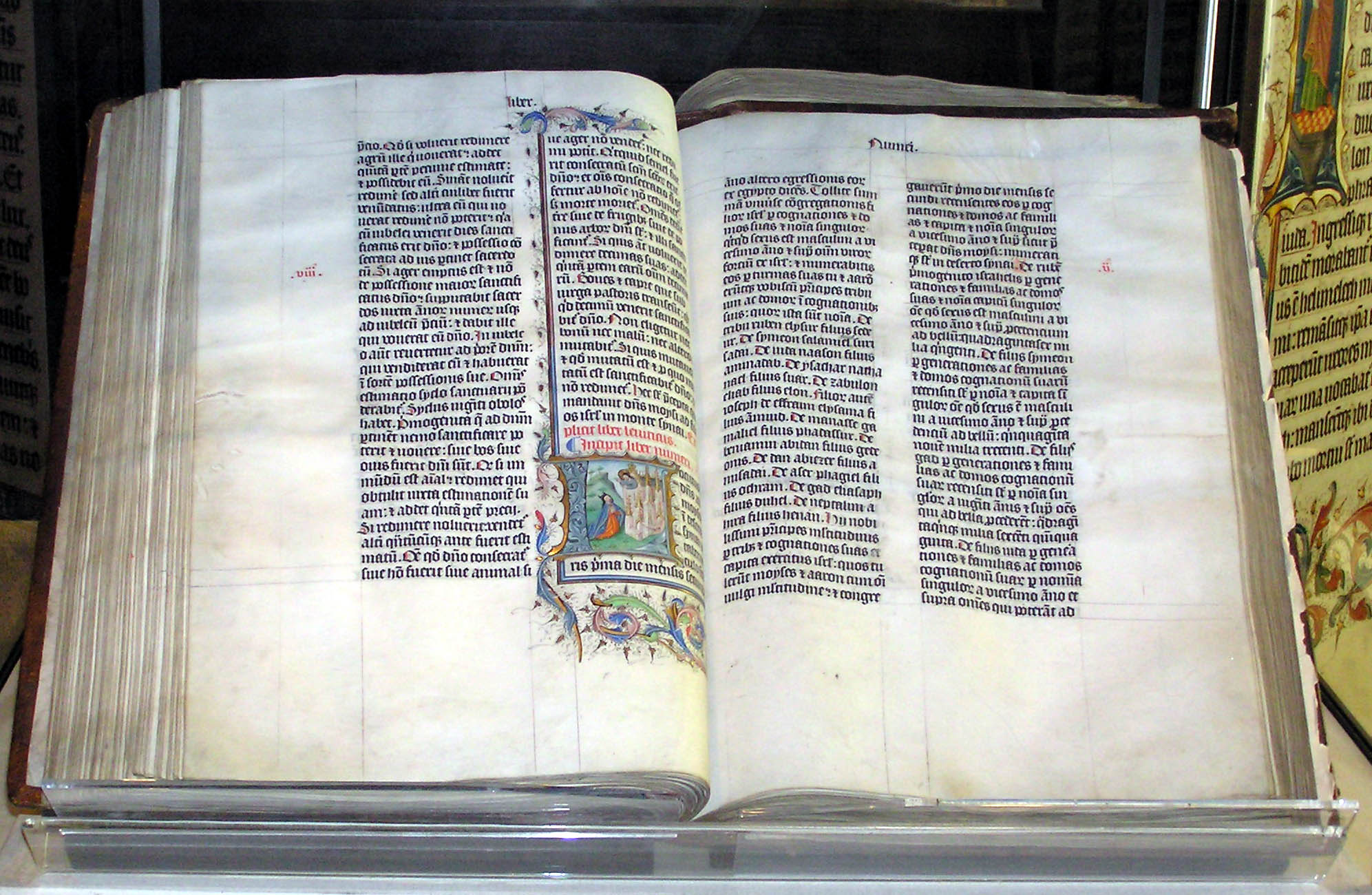
A Bible handwritten in Latin, on display in Malmesbury Abbey, Wiltshire, England

The Bible is the most translated book in the world, with more translations (including an increasing number of sign languages) being produced annually.

According to the ProgressBible report by SIL International, on 1 October 2026, speakers of 4,190 languages (out of a total of 7,394 known living languages) had access to at least a book of the Bible, including 1,515 languages with a portion available (chapters or whole books of the Bible), 1,863 languages with access to the New Testament in their native language, and 812 having the full Bible. This was up from 4,004 languages in August 2025. It is estimated that translation may be required in 512 languages where no work is currently known to be in progress. They also estimate that there are currently around 4,457 languages in at least 173 countries which have active Bible translation projects (with or without some portion already published).

The rate of growth of translation has increased rapidly across the 20th and into the 21st century. In 1900, there were only 510 languages with any portion of the Bible available. By 2000, this had reached 2600 languages. It is estimated that around the year 2033, every language will have access to at least some of the Bible.

== Geographically ==
- Bible translations into the languages of Africa
- Bible translations into the languages of China
- Bible translations into the languages of Europe
- Bible translations into the languages of France
- Bible translations into the languages of Hawaii
- Bible translations into the languages of India
- Bible translations into the languages of Indonesia and Malaysia
- Bible translations into Native American languages
- Bible translations into Oceanic languages
- Bible translations into the languages of the Philippines
- Bible translations into the languages of Russia
- Bible translations into the languages of Taiwan
- Bible translations into constructed languages

== Alphabetically ==
Language	ISO	Internal translations link	Complete 39-book Hebrew-Aramaic Scriptures	Apocrypha	Complete Christian Greek Scriptures
Abkhaz	abk	Bible translations into Abkhaz			✓
Abua	abn	Bible translations into the languages of Africa			
Acholi	ach	Bible translations into the languages of Africa			
Adyghe	ady	Bible translations into the languages of Russia			
Afrikaans	afr	Bible translations into Afrikaans	✓	✓	✓
Aja	ajg	Bible translations into the languages of Africa			
Ainu	ain	Bible translations into Ainu			
Albanian	sqi	Bible translations into Albanian	✓	✓	✓
Altai	alt	Bible translations into the languages of Russia			
Alur	alz	Bible translations into the languages of Africa			✓
Amharic	amh	Bible translations into Amharic	✓	✓	✓
Angolan Sign Language	aoe	Bible translations into sign languages			✓
Apache (Southern Athabaskan)	apc	Bible translations into Apache			
Arabic	ara	Bible translations into Arabic	✓	✓	✓
Aramaic	arc	Bible translations into Aramaic, Targum	✓	✓	✓
Argentinean Sign Language	aed	Bible translations into sign languages			✓
Armenian (Classical)	xcl	Bible translations into Armenian	✓	✓	✓
Armenian (Eastern)	hye	Bible translations into Armenian	✓	✓	✓
Armenian (Western)	hyw	Bible translations into Armenian	✓	✓	✓
Assamese	asm	Bible translations into the languages of India			✓
Aukan	djk	Bible translations into creole languages			✓
Australian Sign Language	asf	Bible translations into sign languages			
Avar	ava	Bible translations into the languages of Russia			
Aymara	aym	Bible translations into Native American languages	✓	✓	✓
Azerbaijani	aze	Bible translations into Azerbaijani	✓		✓
Balochi	bal	Bible translations into Balochi			
Baoule	bci	Bible translations into the languages of Africa	✓		✓
Bashkir	bak	Bible translations into Bashkir			
Bassa (Cameroon)	bas	Bible translations into the languages of Africa	✓		✓
Basque	eus	Bible translations into Basque	✓	✓	✓
Batak (Karo)	btx	Bible translations into Indonesian languages	✓		✓
Batak (Toba)	bbc	Bible translations into Indonesian languages	✓		✓
Belarusian	bel	Bible translations into Belarusian	✓	✓	✓
Belize Kriol	bzj	Bible translations into creole languages			✓
Bengali	ben	Bible translations into Bengali			✓
Bicol	bcl	Bible translations into the languages of the Philippines	✓		✓
Bislama	bis	Bible translations into Oceanic languages	✓		✓
Boulou	bum	Bible translations into the languages of Africa			✓
Brazilian Sign Language	bzs	Bible translations into sign languages	✓		✓
Breton	bre	Bible translations into Breton	✓	✓	✓
British Sign Language	bfi	Bible translations into sign languages			✓
Bulgarian	bul	Bible translations into Bulgarian	✓	✓	✓
Burmese	mya	Bible translations into Burmese			
Buryat	bxr	Bible translations into Buryat			
Cambodian	khm	Bible translations into Khmer	✓		✓
Catalan	cat	Bible translations into Catalan	✓	✓	✓
Cebuano	ceb	Bible translations into the languages of the Philippines	✓		✓
Chamorro	cha	Bible translations into Oceanic languages			
Changana	tso	Bible translations into the languages of Africa	✓		✓
Chechen	che	Bible translations into Chechen			
Cherokee	chr	Bible translations into Cherokee			
Chichewa	nya	Bible translations into the languages of Africa	✓		✓
Chilean Sign Language	csg	Bible translations into sign languages			✓
Chin (Hakha)	cnh	Bible translations into the languages of Myanmar			✓
Chinese	cmn	Bible translations into Chinese	✓		✓
Chinese Sign Language	csl	Bible translations into sign languages			
Chopi	cce	Bible translations into the languages of Africa			✓
Chitonga	tog	Bible translations into the languages of Africa	✓		✓
Chitonga (Zimbabwe)	toh	Bible translations into the languages of Africa			✓
Chitumbuka	tum	Bible translations into the languages of Africa	✓		✓
Chiyao	yao	Bible translations into the languages of Africa			✓
Chokwe	cjk	Bible translations into the languages of Africa			✓
Cinyanja	nya	Bible translations into the languages of Africa			✓
Chol	ctu	Bible translations into Native American languages			✓
Chuabo	chw	Bible translations into the languages of Africa			✓
Chuukese	chk	Bible translations into Oceanic languages			✓
Chuvash	chv	Bible translations into the languages of Russia			✓
Cibemba	bem	Bible translations into the languages of Africa	✓		✓
Cinamwanga	mwn	Bible translations into the languages of Africa			
Cinyanja	nya	Bible translations into the languages of Africa			
Colombian Sign Language	csn	Bible translations into sign languages	✓		✓
Coptic	cop	Coptic versions of the Bible	✓	✓	✓
Cornish	cor	Bible translations into Cornish			
Corsican	cos	Classified under Bible translations into the languages of France, the complete translation of the Bible into the Corsican language is the work of Christian Dubois (2005).	✓	✓	✓
Cree	cre	Bible translations into Cree			
Croatian	hrv	Bible translations into Croatian	✓	✓	✓
Cuban Sign Language	cbs	Bible translations into sign languages			
Czech	ces	Bible translations into Czech	✓	✓	✓
Dakota	dak	Bible translations into Native American languages			
Dangme	ada	Bible translations into the languages of Africa	✓		✓
Danish	dan	Bible translations into Danish	✓	✓	✓
Divehi	div	Bible translations into Divehi			
Douala	dua	Bible translations into the languages of Africa			
Drehu	drh	Bible translations into Oceanic languages			✓
Dutch	nld	Bible translations into Dutch	✓	✓	✓
Dzongkha	dzo	Bible translations into Dzongkha			
Ecuadorian Sign Language	ecs	Bible translations into sign languages			✓
Edo	bin	Bible translations into the languages of Africa			✓
Efik	efi	Bible translations into the languages of Africa	✓		✓
English	eng	List of English Bible translations	✓	✓	✓
Erzya	myv	Bible translations into the languages of Russia			
Esan	ish	Bible translations into the languages of Africa			✓
Esperanto	epo	Bible translations into Esperanto			
Estonian	est	Bible translations into Estonian	✓	✓	✓
Ewe	ewe	Bible translations into the languages of Africa	✓		✓
Fante	fat	Bible translations into the languages of Africa			
Faroese	fao	Bible translations into Faroese			
Fijian	fij	Bible translations into Oceanic languages	✓		✓
Filipino	fil	Bible translations into the languages of the Philippines			
Filipino Sign Language	fsl	Bible translations into sign languages			
Finnish	fin	Bible translations into Finnish	✓	✓	✓
Fon	fon	Bible translations into the languages of Africa			✓
French	fra	Bible translations into French	✓	✓	✓
French Sign Language	lsf	Bible translations into sign languages			✓
Frisian	fry	Bible translations into Frisian			
Ga	gaa	Bible translations into the languages of Africa	✓		✓
Gagauz	gag	Bible translations into the languages of Russia			
Galician	glg	Bible translations into Galician	✓	✓	✓
Ganda	lug	Bible translations into the languages of Africa			
Garifuna	gbc	Bible translations into creole languages			
Geʽez	gez	Bible translations into Geʽez	✓	✓	✓
Georgian	kat	Bible translations into Georgian	✓	✓	✓
German	deu	Bible translations into German	✓	✓	✓
German Sign Language	gsg	Bible translations into sign languages			✓
Ghanaian Sign Language	gse	Bible translations into sign languages			
Gilbertese	gil	Bible translations into Oceanic languages			
Gitonga	git	Bible translations into the languages of Africa			✓
Gokana	gkn	Bible translations into the languages of Africa			
Gothic	got	Gothic Bible			
Greek	ell	Bible translations into Greek, Septuagint	✓		✓
Greenlandic	kal	Bible translations into Eskimo–Aleut languages			✓
Guarani	grn	Bible translations into Tupian languages	✓	✓	✓
Guadeloupean Creole	gcf	Bible translations into creole languages			
Gujarati	guj	Bible translations into the languages of India	✓		✓
Gun	guw	Bible translations into the languages of Africa	✓		✓
Haitian Creole	hat	Bible translations into creole languages	✓		✓
Hausa	hau	Bible translations into the languages of Africa			✓
Havu	hav	Bible translations into the languages of Africa			
Hawaiian	haw	Bible translations into Hawaiian			
Hawai’i Pidgin	hwc	Bible translations into creole languages			
Hebrew	heb	Bible translations into Hebrew	✓		✓
Herero	her	Bible translations into the languages of Africa			
Hiligaynon	hil	Bible translations into the languages of the Philippines	✓		✓
Hindi	hin	Bible translations into Hindi and Urdu	✓		✓
Hiri Motu	ho	Bible translations into Oceanic languages	✓		✓
Hmong	hmn	Bible translations into the languages of China			
Hmong (White)	mww	Bible translations into the languages of China			
Hungarian	hun	Bible translations into Hungarian	✓		✓
Iban	iba	Bible translations into the languages of Malaysia			✓
Ibinda	bln	Bible translations into the languages of Africa			✓
Icelandic	isl	Bible translations into Icelandic	✓	✓	✓
Igbo	ibo	Bible translations into the languages of Africa	✓	✓	✓
Ilocano	ilo	Bible translations into Ilocano	✓		✓
Indian Sign Language	ins	Bible translations into sign languages			✓
Indonesian	ind	Bible translations into Indonesian	✓		✓
Indonesian Sign Language	inl	Bible translations into sign languages			✓
Inuktitut	iku	Complete Bible in Inuktitut			
Inupiaq	ipk	Bible translations into Inupiat			
Irish	gle	Bible translations into Irish	✓	✓	✓
Isoko	iso	Bible translations into the languages of Africa	✓		✓
Italian	ita	Bible translations into Italian	✓	✓	✓
Italian Sign Language	ise	Bible translations into sign languages	✓		✓
Jamaican Creole	jam	Bible translations into creole languages			
Japanese	jpn	Bible translations into Japanese	✓		✓
Japanese Sign Language	jsl	Bible translations into sign languages			✓
Javanese	jav	Bible translations into Javanese	✓		✓
Jiwaka	kmp	Bible translations into the languages of Papua New Guinea			
Jula	dyu	Bible translations into the languages of Africa			
Kabardian	kbd	Bible translations into the languages of Russia			
Kabiye	kbp	Bible translations into the languages of Africa	✓		✓
Kabuverdianu	kea	Bible translations into the languages of Africa			✓
Kamba	kam	Bible translations into the languages of Africa			✓
Kannada	kan	Bible translations into Kannada	✓		✓
Kannada (Baraha Bhaashe)	kan	Bible translations into Kannada			
Kanyok	knp	Bible translations into the languages of Africa			
Karen	ksw	Bible translations into the languages of Myanmar			
Karen (S’gaw)	ksw	Bible translations into the languages of Myanmar	✓		✓
Kashubian	csb	Bible translations into Slavic languages			
Kazakh	kaz	Bible translations into Kazakh	✓		✓
Kekchi	kek	Bible translations into Native American languages			✓
Khakas	kjh	Bible translations into the languages of Russia			
Khana	kha	Bible translations into the languages of Africa			
Khmer	khm	Bible translations into Khmer			
Kikongo	kon	Bible translations into the languages of Africa	✓		✓
Kikongo ya Leta	ktu	Bible translations into the languages of Africa			
Kikuyu	kik	Bible translations into the languages of Africa	✓		✓
Kiluba	lub	Bible translations into the languages of Africa	✓		✓
Kimbundu	kmb	Bible translations into the languages of Africa			✓
Kinande	nnb	Bible translations into the languages of Africa			✓
Kinyarwanda	kin	Bible translations into the languages of Africa	✓		✓
Kipende	pen	Bible translations into the languages of Africa			✓
Kirghiz	kir	Bible translations into Kyrgyz	✓		✓
Kirundi	run	Bible translations into the languages of Africa	✓		✓
Kisi	kss	Bible translations into the languages of Africa	✓		✓
Kisonge	sop	Bible translations into the languages of Africa			✓
Kituba	ktu	Bible translations into the languages of Africa			✓
Kokola	ktu	Bible translations into the languages of Africa			
Komi	kom	Bible translations into the languages of Russia			
Kongo	kon	Bible translations into the languages of Africa	✓		✓
Konkani	kok	Bible translations into Konkani			
Konkani (Roman)	kok	Bible translations into Konkani			✓
Korean	kor	Bible translations into Korean	✓		✓
Korean Sign Language	kvk	Bible translations into sign languages	✓		✓
Krio	kri	Bible translations into creole languages	✓		✓
Kurdish	kur	Bible translations into Kurdish			
Kurdish Kurmanji	kmr	Bible translations into Kurdish			
Kurdish Kurmanji (Caucasus)	kmr	Bible translations into Kurdish			
Kwangali	kwn	Bible translations into the languages of Africa			✓
Kwanyama	kj	Bible translations into the languages of Africa			✓
Kyrgyz	kir	Bible translations into Kyrgyz			
Lao	lao	Bible translations into Lao	✓		✓
Lari	ldi	Bible translations into the languages of Africa			
Latin	lat	Bible translations into Latin, Vulgate	✓	✓	✓
Latvian	lav	Bible translations into Latvian	✓	✓	✓
Lendu	lnu	Bible translations into the languages of Africa			
Lenje	leh	Bible translations into the languages of Africa			
Lhukonzo	nko	Bible translations into the languages of Africa			
Liberian English	lir	Bible translations into English			
Lingala	lin	Bible translations into the languages of Africa	✓	✓	✓
Lithuanian	lit	Bible translations into Lithuanian	✓	✓	✓
Lolo	iii	Bible translations into the languages of China			✓
Lomwe	lon	Bible translations into the languages of Africa			✓
Low German	nds	Bible translations into German			✓
Lower Sorbian	dsb	Bible translations into Sorbian			
Lozi	loz	Bible translations into the languages of Africa	✓		✓
Luganda	lug	Bible translations into the languages of Africa	✓		✓
Lunda	lun	Bible translations into the languages of Africa	✓		✓
Luo	luo	Bible translations into the languages of Africa	✓		✓
Luvale	lue	Bible translations into the languages of Africa	✓		✓
Luxembourgish	ltz	Bible translations into Luxembourgish			
Macedonian	mkd	Bible translations into Macedonian	✓		✓
Macua	vmw	Bible translations into the languages of Africa	✓		✓
Madagascar Sign Language	mfs	Bible translations into sign languages			
Malagasy	mlg	Bible translations into the languages of Africa	✓		✓
Malawi Sign Language	mai	Bible translations into sign languages			✓
Malay	msa	Bible translations into Malay	✓		✓
Malayalam	mal	Bible translations into Malayalam	✓		✓
Maltese	mlt	Bible translations into Maltese	✓	✓	✓
Mam	mam	Bible translations into Native American languages			
Mambwe-Lungu	mab	Bible translations into the languages of Africa	✓		✓
Manchu	mnc	Bible translations into Manchu			
Manipuri	mni	Bible translations into the languages of India			
Manx	glv	Bible translations into Manx			
Manyawa	mab	Bible translations into the languages of Africa			✓
Mapudungun	arn	Bible translations into Native American languages			✓
Marathi	mar	Bible translations into Marathi	✓		✓
Marshallese	mah	Bible translations into Oceanic languages			✓
Martiniquan Creole	gcf	Bible translations into creole languages			
Mauritian Creole	mfe	Bible translations into creole languages			✓
Maya (Yucatec)	yua	Bible translations into Native American languages	✓		✓
Māori	mri	Bible translations into Oceanic languages			
Mari	chm	Bible translations into the languages of Russia			
Mbunda	mku	Bible translations into the languages of Africa			✓
Mexican Sign Language	mfs	Bible translations into sign languages	✓		✓
Mingrelian	xmf	Bible translations into Georgian			✓
Mixe (North Central)	mco	Bible translations into Native American languages			
Mixtec (Alacatlatzala)	mim	Bible translations into Native American languages			✓
Mixtec (Ayutla)	miy	Bible translations into Native American languages			✓
Mixtec (Metlatónoc)	mxv	Bible translations into Native American languages			✓
Mizo	lus	Bible translations into the languages of India			✓
Mongolian	mon	Bible translations into Mongolian			✓
Moore	mos	Bible translations into the languages of Africa	✓		✓
Mossi	mos	Bible translations into the languages of Africa			
Motu	meu	Bible translations into Oceanic languages			
Mozambican Sign Language	mfs	Bible translations into sign languages			
Myanmar	mya	Bible translations into Burmese	✓		✓
Nahuatl (Central)	nhn	Bible translations into Native American languages	✓		✓
Nahuatl (Classical)	nci	Bible translations into Native American languages			
Nahuatl (Guerrero)	ngu	Bible translations into Native American languages			✓
Nahuatl (Huasteca)	nhi	Bible translations into Native American languages			✓
Nahuatl (Sierra Puebla)	ncj	Bible translations into Native American languages			✓
Nahuatl (Southeastern Puebla)	npl	Bible translations into Native American languages			✓
Nauruan	nau	Bible translations into Oceanic languages			
Navajo	nav	Bible translations into Native American languages			
Ndau	ndc	Bible translations into the languages of Africa			✓
Ndebele	nde	Bible translations into the languages of Africa	✓		✓
Ndebele (Zimbabwe)	nbl	Bible translations into the languages of Africa	✓		✓
Ndonga	ndo	Bible translations into the languages of Africa			
Nepali	nep	Bible translations into Nepali	✓		✓
Ngabere	gyr	Bible translations into Native American languages			
Ngangela	ngg	Bible translations into the languages of Africa			
Nias	nia	Bible translations into Indonesian languages	✓		✓
Nicobarese	ncb	Bible translations into the languages of India			
Nigerian Sign Language	nsi	Bible translations into sign languages			
Niuean	niu	Bible translations into Oceanic languages			
Nivkh	niv	Bible translations into the languages of Russia			
Northern Sotho	nso	Bible translations into the languages of Africa			
Norwegian	nor	Bible translations into Norwegian	✓	✓	✓
Nsenga	nse	Bible translations into the languages of Africa			
Nsenga (Mozambique)	nse	Bible translations into the languages of Africa			✓
Nsenga (Zambia)	nse	Bible translations into the languages of Africa			
Nyaneka	nyk	Bible translations into the languages of Africa	✓		✓
Nyungwe	nyw	Bible translations into the languages of Africa			✓
Nzema	nzi	Bible translations into the languages of Africa	✓		✓
Occitan	oci	Bible translations into the languages of France			
Odia	ori	Christianity in Odisha			
Okpe	oke	Bible translations into the languages of Africa			✓
Oromo	orm	Bible translations into the languages of Africa	✓		✓
Ossetian	oss	Bible translations into the languages of Russia	✓		✓
Otetela	otj	Bible translations into the languages of Africa	✓		✓
Palauan	pau	Bible translations into Oceanic languages			
Pangasinan	pag	Bible translations into the languages of the Philippines	✓		✓
Papiamento	pap	Bible translations into creole languages	✓		✓
Paraguayan Sign Language	pss	Bible translations into sign languages			
Pashto	pus	Bible translations into Pashto			
Persian	fas	Bible translations into Persian	✓		✓
Peruvian Sign Language	prl	Bible translations into sign languages			✓
Phimbi	phm	Bible translations into the languages of Africa			✓
Pidgin (West Africa)	wmc	Bible translations into creole languages			✓
Polish	pol	Bible translations into Polish	✓	✓	✓
Polish Sign Language	pso	Bible translations into sign languages			✓
Portuguese	por	Bible translations into Portuguese	✓	✓	✓
Punjabi	pan	Bible translations into Punjabi	✓		✓
Punjabi (Shahmukhi)	pnb	Bible translations into Punjabi			
Quechua	que	Bible translations into Native American languages	✓	✓	✓
Quechua (Ancash)	qvn	Bible translations into Native American languages	✓		✓
Quechua (Ayacucho)	quy	Bible translations into Native American languages	✓		✓
Quechua (Bolivia)	qul	Bible translations into Native American languages	✓		✓
Quechua (Cuzco)	quz	Bible translations into Native American languages	✓		✓
Quechua (Huallaga Huánuco)	qvh	Bible translations into Native American languages			
Quenya	qya	Bible translations into fictional languages			
Quiché	quc	Bible translations into Native American languages	✓		✓
Quichua	qvi	Bible translations into Native American languages			
Romanian	ron	Bible translations into Romanian	✓	✓	✓
Romany	rom	Bible translations into Romani			
Romany (Eastern Slovakia)	rml	Bible translations into Romani			✓
Romany (Macedonia)	rrm	Bible translations into Romani			✓
Romany (Southern Greece)	rmn	Bible translations into Romani			✓
Romany (Vlax, Russia)	rmy	Bible translations into Romani			✓
Romansh	roh	Bible translations into Romansh			
Ronga	rng	Bible translations into the languages of Africa			✓
Rundi	run	Bible translations into the languages of Africa			
Russian	rus	Bible translations into Russian	✓		✓
Russian Sign Language	rsl	Bible translations into sign languages	✓		✓
Rutoro	nyn	Bible translations into the languages of Africa			
Samoan	smo	Bible translations into Oceanic languages	✓		✓
Sango	sag	Bible translations into the languages of Africa	✓		✓
Sanskrit	san	Bible translations into Sanskrit			
Santali	sat	Bible translations into the languages of India			
Saramaccan	srn	Bible translations into creole languages			
Sardinian	srd	Bible translations into Sardinian			
Scots	sco	Bible translations into Scots			
Scottish Gaelic	gla	Bible translations into Scottish Gaelic	✓	✓	✓
Sena	seh	Bible translations into the languages of Africa	✓		✓
Sepedi	nso	Bible translations into the languages of Africa	✓		✓
Sepulana	nso	Bible translations into the languages of Africa	✓		✓
Serbian	srp	Bible translations into Serbian	✓		✓
Sesotho	sot	Bible translations into the languages of Africa			
Sesotho (Lesotho)	sot	Bible translations into the languages of Africa	✓		✓
Sesotho (South Africa)	sot	Bible translations into the languages of Africa	✓		✓
Setswana	tsn	Bible translations into the languages of Africa	✓		✓
Seychelles Creole	crs	Bible translations into creole languages	✓		✓
Shan	shn	Bible translations into the languages of Myanmar			
Shona	sna	Bible translations into the languages of Africa	✓		✓
Sichuan Yi	iii	Bible translations into the languages of China			
Sidama	sid	Bible translations into the languages of Africa			✓
Silozi	loz	Bible translations into the languages of Africa	✓		✓
Sindhi	snd	Bible translations into Sindhi			
Sinhala	sin	Bible translations into Sinhala	✓		✓
Slovak	slk	Bible translations into Slovak	✓	✓	✓
Slovene	slv	Bible translations into Slovene	✓	✓	✓
Somali	som	Bible translations into Somali			
Sorbian	wen	Bible translations into Sorbian			
South African Sign Language	sfs	Bible translations into sign languages			✓
Spanish	spa	Bible translations into Spanish	✓	✓	✓
Spanish Sign Language	ssp	Bible translations into sign languages	✓		✓
Sranantongo	srn	Bible translations into creole languages	✓		✓
Sunda	sun	Bible translations into Indonesian languages	✓		✓
Sunuwar	suz	Bible translation into Kiranti Language of Nepal. Old and New Testament was completed in 2011 and published by Nepal Bible Society (at that time, merely Bible Society).			
Swahili	swa	Bible translations into the languages of Africa	✓	✓	✓
Swati	ssw	Bible translations into the languages of Africa	✓		✓
Swedish	swe	Bible translations into Swedish	✓	✓	✓
Syriac	syc	Syriac versions of the Bible	✓	✓	✓
Taabwa	tap	Bible translations into the languages of Africa			
Tagalog	tgl	Bible translations into the languages of the Philippines	✓	✓	✓
Tajik	tgk	Bible translations into Persian	✓		✓
Tamil	tam	Bible translations into Tamil	✓		✓
Tandroy	tdx	Bible translations into the languages of Africa			
Tankarana	tdx	Bible translations into the languages of Africa			
Tarascan	pua	Bible translations into Native American languages			✓
Tatar	tat	Bible translations into the languages of Russia	✓		✓
Telugu	tel	Bible translations into Telugu	✓		✓
Tetum	tet	Bible translations into Oceanic languages	✓		✓
Tetun Dili	tdt	Bible translations into Tetun	✓		✓
Tewe	twx	Bible translations into the languages of Africa			✓
Thai	tha	Bible translations into Thai	✓		✓
Tibetan	bod	Bible translations into Tibetan			
Tigrinya	tir	Bible translations into the languages of Africa	✓		✓
Tiv	tiv	Bible translations into the languages of Africa	✓		✓
Tlapanec	tpx	Bible translations into Native American languages			✓
Tojolabal	toj	Bible translations into Native American languages			✓
Tok Pisin	tpi	Bible translations into Oceanic languages	✓	✓	✓
Tongan	ton	Bible translations into Oceanic languages	✓		✓
Totonac	tos	Bible translations into Native American languages			✓
Toupouri	tui	Bible translations into the languages of Africa			
Tshiluba	lua	Bible translations into the languages of Africa	✓		✓
Tshwa	tsc	Bible translations into the languages of Africa	✓		✓
Tsonga	tso	Bible translations into the languages of Africa	✓		✓
Tswana	tsn	Bible translations into the languages of Africa			
Turkish	tur	Bible translations into Turkish	✓		✓
Turkmen	tuk	Bible translations into Turkmen	✓		✓
Tuvaluan	tvl	Bible translations into Oceanic languages	✓		✓
Twi	twi	Bible translations into the languages of Africa	✓		✓
Tzeltal	tzh	Bible translations into Native American languages	✓		✓
Tzotzil	two	Bible translations into Native American languages	✓		✓
Udmurt	udm	Bible translations into the languages of Russia			
Uighur	uig	Bible translations into Uyghur			
Ukrainian	ukr	Bible translations into Ukrainian	✓	✓	✓
Umbundu	umb	Bible translations into the languages of Africa	✓		✓
Upper Sorbian	hsb	Bible translations into Sorbian			
Urdu	urd	Bible translations into Hindi and Urdu			✓
Urhobo	urh	Bible translations into the languages of Africa			✓
Uruund	rnd	Bible translations into the languages of Africa			✓
Uyghur	uig	Bible translations into Uyghur			
Uzbek	uzb	Bible translations into Uzbek	✓		✓
Valencian	cat	Bible translations into Valencian			✓
Venda	ven	Bible translations into the languages of Africa	✓		✓
Venezuelan Sign Language	sven	Bible translations into sign languages			✓
Vezo	mlg	Bible translations into the languages of Africa			
Vietnamese	vie	Bible translations into Vietnamese	✓	✓	✓
Volapük	vol	Bible translations into constructed languages			
Võro	vro	Bible translations into Estonian			
Wallisian	wls	Bible translations into Oceanic languages	✓		✓
Walloon	wln	Bible translations into the languages of France			
Waray-Waray	war	Bible translations into the languages of the Philippines	✓		✓
Wayuunaiki	guc	Bible translations into Native American languages			✓
Welsh	cym	Bible translations into Welsh	✓	✓	✓
Wolaita	wal	Bible translations into the languages of Africa			✓
Wolof	wol	Bible translations into the languages of Africa			
Xhosa	xho	Bible translations into the languages of Africa	✓	✓	✓
Yacouba	daf	Bible translations into the languages of Africa			
Yakut	sah	Bible translations into the languages of Russia			
Yiddish	yid	Bible translations into Yiddish			
Yoruba	yor	Bible translations into the languages of Africa	✓	✓	✓
Zambian Sign Language	zsl	Bible translations into sign languages			✓
Zapotec (Choápam)	zpc	Bible translations into Native American languages			✓
Zapotec (Isthmus)	zai	Bible translations into Native American languages			✓
Zapotec (Mitla)	zaw	Bible translations into Native American languages			✓
Zapotec (Yatzachi)	zay	Bible translations into Native American languages			✓
Zhuang	zha	Bible translations into the languages of China			
Zimbabwe Sign Language	zib	Bible translations into sign languages			✓
Zulu	zul	Bible translations into the languages of Africa	✓	✓	✓

== Translation efforts and organisations ==
Many Bibles have been translated and published with the aid of a global fellowship of around 150 Bible Societies which collectively form The United Bible Societies. The other largest contributor is Wycliffe Bible Translators and other members of the Wycliffe Global Alliance, but there are many other churches and organisations involved. The Digital Bible Library lists over 240 different contributors.

In the early 1500s, like-minded Catholic bishops sponsored leading humanist scholar Erasmus of Rotterdam's wish to improve the Vulgate, return to newly available Greek sources, enable reliable vernacular translations, and provide a devotional alternative to ceremonial religion, with his project make a new Latin/Greek edition of the New Testament, with substantial philological annotations. This effort was successful, and immediately stimulated vernacular translations, notably Luther's Bible which was subsequently re-translated into other Germanic languages.

== See also ==
- Category:Bible translators
