= Bible translations into Thai =

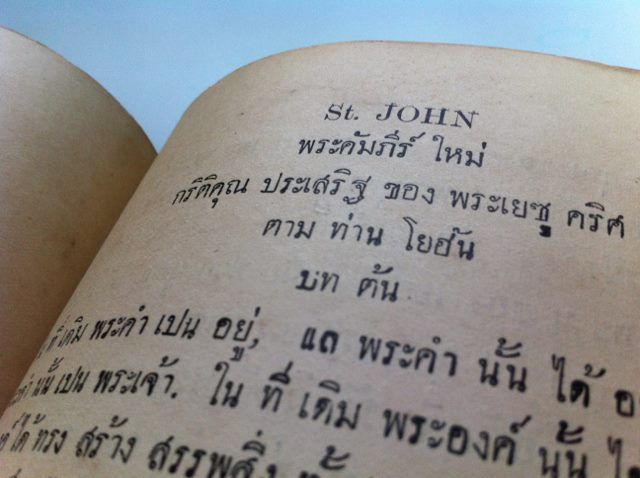
Thai Bible (first page of the Gospel of John), printed 1891

The entire Bible was published in Thai in 1894 and there are currently several translations of the Bible in the Thai language.

== Contemporary Translations ==
Thai translations of the Bible currently in print include the Thai Standard Version (THSV 2011), the Thai New Contemporary Version (TNCV), the Thai King James Version (TKJV), the New Thai Translation Version, the New World Translation of the Holy Scriptures (NWT), and the Easy-to-Read Thai Bible (ERV). A Catholic Thai translation of the Bible including Apocrypha is available from Thai Catholic booksellers.

== Comparison ==
Translation	John 3:16
THSV 2011	พระ‍เจ้าทรงรักโลกดัง‍นี้ คือได้ประ‌ทานพระ‍บุตรองค์เดียวของพระ‍องค์ เพื่อทุก‍คนที่วาง‍ใจในพระ‍บุตรนั้นจะไม่พินาศ แต่มีชีวิตนิ‌รันดร์
THSV 1971	เพราะ‍ว่าพระ‍เจ้าทรง‍รักโลก จนได้ทรงประ‌ทานพระ‍บุตรองค์เดียวของพระ‍องค์ เพื่อทุก‍คนที่วาง‍ใจในพระ‍บุตรนั้นจะไม่พินาศ แต่มีชีวิตนิรันดร์
TCV	เพราะพระเจ้ารักโลก จึงได้มอบพระบุตรองค์เดียวของพระองค์ เพื่อใครก็ตามที่เชื่อในพระบุตร จะไม่พินาศแต่มีชีวิตนิรันดร์
TNCV	เพราะว่าพระเจ้าทรงรักโลกจนได้ประทานพระบุตรองค์เดียวของพระองค์ เพื่อทุกคนที่เชื่อในพระบุตรนั้นจะไม่พินาศแต่มีชีวิตนิรันดร์
TKJV	เพราะว่าพระเจ้าทรงรักโลก จนได้ทรงประทานพระบุตรองค์เดียวของพระองค์ที่บังเกิดมา เพื่อผู้ใดที่เชื่อในพระบุตรนั้นจะไม่พินาศ แต่มีชีวิตนิรันดร์
ERV	เพราะว่าพระเจ้ารักผูกพันกับมนุษย์ในโลกนี้มาก จนถึงขนาดยอมสละพระบุตรเพียงองค์เดียวของพระองค์ เพื่อว่าทุกคนที่ไว้วางใจในพระบุตรนั้นจะไม่สูญสิ้น แต่จะมีชีวิตกับพระเจ้าตลอดไป
NWT 2015	พระเจ้ารักโลกมาก จนถึงกับยอมสละลูกคนเดียวของพระองค์ เพื่อทุกคนที่แสดงความเชื่อในท่านจะไม่ถูกทำลาย แต่จะมีชีวิตตลอดไป

== History of Thai Bible Translation ==
The earliest known attempt at a translation of the Bible into Thai is a free translation of the first chapter of the Gospel of Luke, starting at verse 5. This was translated in 1685 by Louis Laneau of the Paris Foreign Missions Society.

The first Protestant effort at Thai Bible translation was a translation of the Gospel of Matthew by Ann Judson. Karl Gützlaff and Jacob Tomlin, who are regarded as the first two resident Protestant missionaries in Thailand, translated the four Gospels and Romans from Chinese into Thai. They were assisted by a Chinese man and a Burmese man, both of whom spoke Thai. John Taylor Jones, an ABMU missionary, translated the New Testament from Greek into the Thai language. Part of the Bible in Thai was first published in 1834. Jones' translation of the New Testament in Thai was printed for the first time in 1846. The translation of the Old Testament was finished in 1883 and the Bible with the complete Protestant canon in Thai was published as a single volume for the first time in 1894. This edition of the Bible was later revised by the Thailand Bible Society using the King James Version (KJV) as the base text and published as the Thai Standard Version in 1940. This translation was subsequently revised using the Revised Standard Version (RSV) and Authorized Standard Version (ASV) as the base text and republished in 1971. The Thai Easy-to-Read Version was described by its editor, Tanapon Saowatarnpong, as "Easy to ready is hard to write." It has made the text easier to read by reducing citations from the archaic honorific system, using honor/shame vocabulary, and reducing "insider" Christian vocabulary.

Jehovah's Witnesses released the New World Translation of the Christian Greek Scriptures for the first time in Thai by 2007. This Christian Greek Scriptures is based from the English 1984 edition of the New World Translation of the Holy Scriptures which was released in 1984 in the United States. Few years later, in 2015, a complete Bible with Hebrew Scriptures and revised Christian Greek Scriptures was released in Thai with a new name called: คัมภีร์ไบเบิลฉบับแปลโลกใหม่ (New World Translation of the Holy Scriptures). The Bible is based from the English 2013 revision of the New World Translation of the Holy Scriptures which was released in 2013 in Jersey City, New Jersey, U.S.A. This newly revised edition includes the use of more modern and understandable language (comparison above), clarified Biblical expression, appendixes, and many more.

== Other Language Bibles in Thailand ==
In addition to the Thai Bible, several other language Bible translations are used in Thailand, especially among ethnic minorities. These include Chinese, Lao, Burmese, Cambodian, Malay, Karen, Akha, Hmong, Lahu, Lawa, and Shan.
