= Bible translations into the languages of Europe =

Since Peter Waldo's Franco-Provençal translation of the New Testament in the late 1170s, and Guyart des Moulins' Bible Historiale manuscripts of the Late Middle Ages, there have been innumerable vernacular translations of the scriptures on the European continent, greatly aided and catalysed by the development of the printing press, first invented by Johannes Gutenberg in the late 1430s.

Year	Language	Notes
1471	Italian	Bible translations into Italian
1478	Catalan	translated into Catalan by Bonifaci Ferrer, known as the Valencian Bible
1522	German	Luther Bible
1530	French	Bible translations into French
1535	English	List of English Bible translations
1541	Swedish	Bible translations into Swedish
1550	Danish	Bible translations into Danish
1569	Spanish	Bible translations into Spanish
1571	Basque	Joanes Leizarraga, a Catholic priest who joined the Reformation, translated the New Testament into Basque
1578	Slovenian	Jurij Dalmatin, Bible translations into Slovene
1588	Welsh	Bible translations into Welsh
1416	Hungarian	Bible translations into Hungarian
1602	Irish	Bible translations into Irish
1637	Dutch	Bible translations into Dutch
1681	Portuguese	A first edition of his New Testament translation was printed in Amsterdam in the year 1681
1694	Latvian	Bible translations into Latvian
1735	Lithuanian	Bible translations into Lithuanian
1739	Estonian	Bible translations into Estonian
1756	Slovak	Bible translations into Slovak
1827	Breton	Bible translations into Breton
1876	Russian	Bible translations into Russian
1934	Serbian	Bible translations into Serbian

== Corsican ==
The translation of the Bible into Corsican is the work of Christian Dubois (2005).
