= Mirza Khazar =

Azerbaijani author (1947–2020)

- Mirza Khazar
- Born: October 29, 1947; Goychay, Goychay District, Azerbaijan SSR, Soviet Union
- Died: January 31, 2020 (aged 72); Munich, Upper Bavaria, Bavaria, Germany
- Citizenship: United States
- Website: mirzexezer.com

Mirza Karim oghlu Mikayilov (Azerbaijani: Mirzə Kərim oğlu Mikayılov), known as Mirza Khazar (Azerbaijani: Mirzə Xəzər, 29 October 1947 – 31 January 2020), was an eminent Azerbaijani author, political analyst, anchorman, radio journalist, publisher, and translator. Mirza Khazar was a Mountain Jew. He also was known as Mirza Michaeli. Mirza Khazar died on January 31, 2020, in Germany.

== Early life ==
In July 1973, Mirza Khazar completed his graduation at the law faculty at the Azerbaijan State University. From August 1973 to January 1974, he worked as a lawyer in Sumgait. In June 1974, he immigrated to Israel and attended special courses for lawyers from the USSR at Tel-Aviv University. From June 1975 to January 1976, he served in the Israel Defense Forces.

== Bible translation ==
The first Azerbaijani translation by Mirza Farrukh and Feliks Zaręba was the Gospel of Matthew, published in 1842 in London by Basel Missionary Society. The complete New Testament was fully translated and published in 1878 in London and the Old Testament in 1891.

At the request of the Stockholm Institute for Bible Translation, Mirza Khazar translated the Bible – the New Testament and Old Testament – into the Azerbaijani language. Mirza Khazar started translation of the entire Bible in 1975 and finished in 1984. In 1982, the Institute for Bible Translation in Stockholm, Sweden, released Mirza Khazar's new modern Azerbaijani language translation of the New Testament, which currently is used in Azerbaijan. The first edition was printed in Zagreb, Croatia. Mirza Khazar's translation of the New Testament was reprinted five times in subsequent years. Mirza Khazar completed translation of the Old Testament in 1984, but the translation has not been printed yet.

== Work ==
From August 1976 to October 1985, Mirza Khazar worked as deputy editor-in-chief of the Azerbaijani Service of Radio Free Europe/Radio Liberty in Munich, Germany. In October 1985, he was invited to Washington, D.C. to be editor-in-chief of the Azerbaijani Service of Radio Voice of America. In February 1987, Mirza Khazar returned to Munich to lead the Azerbaijani Service at Radio Free Europe/Radio Liberty, and he worked there until September 2003. In January 2004, he founded the Voice of Mirza Khazar (Mirzə Xəzərin Səsi) newspaper in Baku. Mirza Khazar, and he ran the online newspaper The Voice of Mirza Khazar in three languages: Azerbaijani, English, and Russian. From September to October 2005, Mirza Khazar was host of Azadlig TV (Freedom TV), the first independent station to broadcast from a foreign country to Azerbaijan. In December 2005, he launched an Internet radio program, The Voice of Mirza Khazar, where visitors can listen to prerecorded audio items.

== Papers ==
Mirza Khazar's articles pertaining to the political and economic situation in Azerbaijan and other former Soviet states were published in Azerbaijan, Turkey, Czech Republic, and other countries. Mirza Khazar's The Formation of the Popular Front in Azerbaijan (December 28, 1988) was the first research paper about attempts of local intellectuals and patriots to launch a national-democratic movement in Azerbaijan. The Azerbaijani Popular Front was created officially in 1989. In August 1989, his Birlik Society in the Azerbaijani Democratic Movement was published.

== 1990 Black January ==
During the Black January crackdown, the Soviets managed to suppress all efforts to disseminate news from Azerbaijan to the local population and the international community. On the eve of the Soviet military invasion in Baku, an energy supply source to Azerbaijani TV and State Radio was blown up by intelligence officers in order to cut off the population from any source of information. TV and radio was silent and all print media was banned. Despite these efforts, Mirza Khazar and his staff at Radio Free Europe/Radio Liberty succeeded in broadcasting daily reports from Baku, which were the only source of news to Azerbaijanis within and outside the country for several days. The Kremlin leadership tried hard to keep the outside world and the population inside Azerbaijan unaware of the military invasion, but Mirza Khazar and his staff foiled this attempt. Thanks to Mirza Khazar and his staff at Radio Liberty, Azerbaijanis in and outside Azerbaijan, as well as the international community, learned about the Soviet invasion and gained a chance to organize protest actions. Shocked by this "surprising" development, the government of the USSR complained officially to the United States about Radio Liberty's coverage of the military invasion of Azerbaijan. The January 20, 1990, broadcasts turned Mirza Khazar into a legend among Azerbaijanis in and outside Azerbaijan. Melahet Agacankizi, a well-known Azerbaijani poet and writer, described Mirza Khazar's appearance on radio at the time of the Soviet military invasion as follows: "On January 20, Mirza Khazar with his God-given divine voice, gave hope to the dying Azerbaijani people." His distinctive voice and his name are familiar to Azerbaijanis inside and outside Azerbaijan.

== Books ==
The first book by Mirza Khazar "Verba Volant, Scripta Manent" ("Words fly away, written words remain") appeared in Munich, Germany in 2013. The second book "Factum est Factum" ("Facts are Facts") was printed at the end of December 2014. Both books are available online on the internet.

== Awards ==
Mirza Khazar's name was included into the book "100 Great Azerbaijanis", prepared by the prominent Azerbaijani researcher and writer Alisa Nijat and published in Baku in 1999. In 1990, The Popular Front of Azerbaijan awarded Mirza Khazar the Mahammad Amin Rasulzade prize for his role in the national-democratic movement in Azerbaijan. Mahammad Amin Rasulzade was one of the founders of the first independent Azerbaijani Republic in 1918. Sabir Rustamkhanly, a prominent Azerbaijani writer and politician, called Mirza Khazar "a symbol of our national struggle" in his interview with the newspaper "Cumhuriyet" in September 2003.

Mirza Khazar lived in Munich, Germany for a long time.

== Audio archive ==
- 20 yanvar 1990 – Mirza Khazar's audio of 20 January 1990
- Poetry: Khalil Rza
- Poetry: Mirza Alekber Sabir
- Poetry: Hokume Bulluri

== Articles in English ==
- Azerbaijani Economy, 2001
- Political Situation in Azerbaijan, 2001
- Successor Issue in Azerbaijan, 2001
- Relations Between Azerbaijan and Turkey
- Karabakh Peace Talks in Key West
- Iranian-Azerbaijani Relations
- There Was No Anti-Semitism In Azerbaijan
- The Fight For Azerbaijan, or, Illusions Again?
