= Bible translations into Kazakh =

Work on translation of the Bible into the Kazakh language began with the work of Charles Fraser of the Scottish Missionary Society. Fraser's translation of Matthew was published in 1818 (this was based on H. Brunton's Karass translation, and modified for Kazakh), and the New Testament in 1820 by the Russian Bible Society. J. M. E. Gottwald, a professor at Kazan University, revised it, and this was published in 1880 by the British and Foreign Bible Society in Kazan, and it was republished in 1887, and 1910. George W. Hunter, of the China Inland Mission in Ürümqi, considered this translation to be "a good translation, into Astrahan-Turki", he does not seem to have considered it to be Kazakh. Darlow and Moule say that it was intended for Kyrgyz in the neighbourhood of Orenburg, and the language was sometimes called "Orenburg Tatar". According to Rev. W. Nicholson of the Royal Asiatic Society in St Petersburg this translation was intended for "The Kirghese hordes—Great, Little, and Middle, as they are called—[who] occupy various regions in Southern Siberia, Central Asia, and west of the Caspian Sea." George A. King says Fraser's translation was into the language of the "Western Kirghiz or Kirghiz-Kazak, though they disown the name Kirghiz".

Macarius II, the Bishop of Tomsk, translated Mark, published by the British and Foreign Bible Society in Tomsk in 1894. All four Gospels in one volume were published in Kazan by Pravoslavnoe Missionerskoe Obshchestvo in 1901. This may be related to the edition of Mark previously published in Kazan, or could be the same as I. Katerinski's translation, listed in Book of a Thousand Tongues as Kirghiz.

Mildred Cable's biography of George Hunter just says "a Qazaq speaking Russian". This version is printed in a Cyrillic script, slightly different from what Qazaqs use today; this script has a lot of Russian/Greek words in it, and uses Russian/Greek names, instead of Qazaq/Islamic ones. The 1901 work was republished in 1972 by the Institute for Bible Translation in Stockholm, Sweden.

George W. Hunter of the China Inland Mission was aware of the Kazan 1901 translation, and after much prayer that he would be able to get a copy of it, a man approached him in the bazaar offering to exchange it (a book he could not read) for one that he could. Hunter revised these translations and transliterated them into Arabic. He also translated Genesis and Acts.

== Publication ==
Acts, Mark, and a tentative edition of Matthew was published by the British and Foreign Bible Society/China Inland Mission in "Tihwafu" (Ürümqi) in 1917. A 2nd edition, (new ed. of the 1917 translation by G. W. Hunter) of Mark was published in Shanghai in 1918. A 2nd edition (new ed. of the 1917 translation by G. W. Hunter) of Acts was published by the British and Foreign Bible Society in Shanghai in 1919. All four Gospels were published again by the British and Foreign Bible Society in Shanghai in 1927, and again in 1928. The Shanghai BFBS also published Genesis in 1931. There may have also been other parts of the Bible translated by G. W. Hunter, but they are lost, as is record of them.

== Kyeli Kitap ==
A modern translation of the entire Kazak Bible was published by Yeni Yaşam Yayınları in 2010 in Istanbul.

== Kazakh Bible Society ==
In 2015 the Kazakh Bible Society published a new translation of the Bible in two variants: a study Bible and a plain text Bible.

== Bible Mission ==
Bible Mission produced a new translation into Kazakh. This is mainly based on the Russian Synodal and the Kyrgyz 2004 translation, but also other translations and Hebrew and Greek. They finished most of the New Testament and have released preliminary translations for Old Testament books. It aims to be a more literal translation than YYY's translation. The most current edition of this translation is from 2023.

== Jehovah's Witness ==
In 2011, Jehovah's Witnesses published Мәсіхшілердің грек жазбалары. Жаңа дүние аудармасы (New World Translation of the Christian Greek Scriptures) in Kazakh; the complete New World Translation of the Holy Scriptures in Kazakh was released on September 26, 2014 in Kazakhstan.

== Text examples ==
Translation	John 3:16
1880, Kazan (Orenburg)	زيراكە خدا جھان ني اول قدر سويدي كە بر دوغمش اوغلين بيردي كە ھركيم ﺁنكا ايشانسا ھلاى بولماي لكن ابدي حيلتلي بولا.
1901, Kazan	Кудай дӳнӳӧнӳ соншама жаксы кӧргендиктен, Ӧзӳнӳҥ жалгыз туган Улын бирде, Оган нанушы ӓр-ким мӓҥги турушы болсун, тек ӓлек болмасын, деп.
1901, Kazan (transliteration)	Qūdai dünienı sonşama jaqsy körgendikten Özınıñ jalğyz tuğan Ūlyn berdı, oğan nanuşy ärkım mäñgı turuşy bolsyn tek älek bolmasyn, dep.
YYY 2010	Өйткені Құдай адамзатты сондай қатты сүйгендіктен, Өзінің жалғыз рухани Ұлын құрбандыққа берді. Енді Оған сенуші әркім жаны тозаққа түспей, мәңгілік өмірге ие болады.
Transliteration (YYY 2010)	Öitkenı Qūdai adamzatty sondai qatty süigendıkten, Özınıñ jalğyz ruhani Ūlyn qūrbandyqqa berdı. Endı Oğan senuşı ärkım jany tozaqqa tüspei, mäñılık ömırge ie bolady.
Modern Xinjiang version	ويتكەنى قۇداي ادامزاتتى سونداي قاتتى سۇيگەندىكتەن، ٴوزىنىڭ جالعىز ۇلىن قۇرباندىققا بەردى. ەندى وعان سەنۋشى اركىمنىڭ جانى توزاققا تۇسپەي، ماڭگىلىك ومىرگە يە بولادى.
New World Translation of the Christian Greek Scriptures 2011	Құдай дүниені сондай қатты сүйгендіктен, өзінің жалғыз Ұлын берді. Ол мұны Ұлына сенген әркім жойылмай, мәңгілік өмірге ие болсын деп істеді.
New World Translation 2014 Jehovah's Witnesses	Құдай адамзаттыa сондай қатты сүйгендіктен, өзінің жалғыз Ұлынb құрбан еттіcн. Енді оған сенген әркім жойылмай, мәңгілік өмірге ие бола аладың
New World Translation in the Kazakh-Arabic Script 2022 Jehovah's Witnesses	قۇ‌داي ادامزاتتى سونداي قاتتى سۇ‌يگە‌ندىكتە‌ن، ٶزىنىڭ جالعىز ۇ‌لىن قۇ‌ربان ە‌تتىق‌. ە‌ندى وعان سە‌نگە‌ن اركىم جويىلماي، ماڭگىلىك ومىرگە يە بولا الادىك‌.
Qazaq halyq awdarmasy (Bible Mission), 2023	Құдай адамзатты қатты сүйгендіктен, Өзінің жалғыз Ұлын құрбандыққа берді. Сонда Оған сенуші әркім өлмей, мәңгілік өмірге ие болады.
Жана Осиет (Association of Bible Society of Kazakhstan), 2023	Өйткені Құдай осы әлемді ерекше сүйіспеншілікпен сүйгендіктен, Ол Өзінің жалғыз Ұлын берді, енді Соған сенген әркім өлмейді, керісінше, мәңгілік өмірге ие болады.
