= Bible translations into Azerbaijani =

The earliest known example of a Bible translation into Ajem-Turkic (also known as Middle Azeri) was made in the 17th century. A copy of it is being stored in the Uppsala University, Sweden.

The first modern Azerbaijani translation by Mirza Farrukh and Feliks Zaręba was the Gospel of Matthew, published in 1842 in London by Basel Missionary Society. The complete New Testament was fully translated and published in 1878 in London and the Old Testament in 1891.

In 1982, the Institute for Bible Translation in Stockholm, Sweden released a new modern Azerbaijani language translation of the New Testament made by Mirza Khazar, which is currently used in Azerbaijan. Mirza Khazar's translation being reprinted five times in subsequent years. The most recent New Testament edition, the sixth, is of 1998, while the Old Testament's one is of 2004. Mirza Khazar's translation of The Old Testament was completed in 1984, but not printed.

Elam published an Iranian (Southern) Azeri translation in 2013.

== Comparison ==
Translation	John (یوحانّا Yəhya) 3:16
Institute for Bible Translation (1996)	Чүнки Аллаһ дүнјаны елә севди ки, ваһид Оғлуну она верди; буну она көрә етди ки, Она иман едәнләрин һеч бири һәлак олмасын, һамысынын әбәди һәјаты олсун.
Institute for Bible Translation (2008)	Çünkı Allah dünyanı elə sevdi ki, vahid Oğlunu verdi; bunu ona görə etdi ki, Ona iman edən hər kəs həlak olmasın, amma əbədi həyata malik olsun.
Iranian Azeri Bible (Elam 2013)	چونکی تاری دونیانی اله سِودی کی، اؤز یگانه اوغلونو فدا اتدی. اونا گؤره کی، اونا ائمان گتئرن هرکس هلاک اولماییب، ابدی حیاتی اولسون.
Iranian Azeri Bible (Elam 2013) (transcribed)	Çünkı Tanrı dünyanı elə sevdi ki, Öz yeganə Oğlunu fəda etdi. Ona görə ki, Ona iman gətirən hər kəs həlak olmayıb, əbədi həyatı olsun.
Jehovah Witness "translation"	Allah dünyanı o qədər sevir ki, yeganə Oğlunu onun uğrunda qurban verdi; bunu ona görə etdi ki, ona iman edənlərin heç biri məhv olmasın, hamısı əbədi yaşasın.
