= Bible translations into Chamorro =

The four Gospels and the Acts of the Apostles and Psalms were translated into the Chamorro language by Francis Marion Price (1850–1937) for the American Bible Society, 1908. The five New Testament books were reprinted without Price's Psalms in 1951. The cover reads Y Cuatro Ebangelio Sija Yan Y Checho Y Apostoles Sija. Bishop Tomas A. Camacho of the CNMI Diocese of Chalan Kanoa translated the whole New Testament by 2003.

== See also ==
- Bible translations into Oceanic languages
