= Bible translations into Sinhala =

The first Europeans to arrive to Sri Lanka were the Portuguese in 1505. During their time, no attempt was made to translate the Bible into Sinhalese.

== Dutch Period ==
During the Dutch period (1638-1796), the first Bible translations into Sinhala language were produced. Simon Kat and Wilhelmus Conijn translated the Gospels and the Catechism. Their translations appeared in print after the printing press was established in Colombo in 1734. Henricus Philipsz translated several Old Testament books between 1783 and 1789.

== British Period ==
During the British Ceylon period, a Bible Society was established in Colombo in 1812. In 1813, it republished the Dutch translation of the New Testament, originally published in 1780, however, it contained many errors. Therefore, the orientalist and civil servant William Tolfrey (1778?–1817) initiated work on a new translation, which was completed after his death in 1823.

The Church Missionary Society undertook a new translation, known as the Cotta version, in 1833.

The Baptist missionaries produced their own translation, which appeared in print between 1859 and 1876.

To match the Revised Version of the Bible, the Sinhalese translation was revised between 1895 and 1910.

Roman Catholic translations of portions of the Bible were produced by Fr. Chounavel in 1929, Sebastian Fernando in 1957 and D. J. Anthony in 1965.

In 1923, work began on the "Union Version" of the Bible, combining the Baptist translation and the revised Bible Society translation. The complete Bible was published in 1938.

== Modern Period ==
A new Bible translation, Sinhala Common Bible, was produced in the 1960-70s by a collaboration all major Christian denominations. The New Testament of the Common translation was printed in 1973.
