= Bible translations into Kyrgyz =

The complete bible has been translated into modern Kyrgyz. There are also translation projects that are partially completed.

== Ray of Hope ==
The New Testament in modern Kyrgyz was first published in 1991 by the Institute for Bible Translation in Stockholm. This was a translation started in the seventies, and translated by Sovet Sadyrov together with Pavlus Artur and a group of Kyrgyzstani Germans. It was translated from a German Bible and the Russian synodal. This translation is generally literal and faithful to the German and Russian translations, but tends to use Russian writing style, and Russian grammar. It also has some problems with vocabulary choices, because of this some words came to have different meanings among Christians then they do among Muslim Kyrgyz.

Ernis Tursunov's translation of the entire Bible from Russian was printed in Kyrgyzstan by Sham publishing in 1998. This is translated into good Kyrgyz but Ernis took quite a lot of poetic license when translating scripture into Kyrgyz, and its not very accurate.

Ray of Hope (Ümüt nuru) bought the copyright of Ernis translation and a complete Bible including a revised version of Sovet's new testament and a revised version of Ernis's old testament was published in 2004. This is currently the most commonly used Bible translation in Kyrgyzstan.

== Lingua Service ==
Lingua Service («Лингвосервис» борбору) together with the United Bible Society (Бириккен Ыйык Китеп Коомдору) published a new translation of the New Testament in 2005. They are currently working on the Old Testament. This translation is translated into good Kyrgyz but is used very little. It is a more interpretive translation with an attempt to make most of the implicit information explicit and thus becoming quite explanatory.

== Askar Mambetaliev ==
Askar Mambetaliev translated large portions of the Bible into a more dynamic equivalent/paraphrase translation. This translation was specially intended for evangelism. Various parts of this translation are translated to different qualities and there hasn't been much consistency checking between parts of it. It is a very free translation and especially in the parts where it was translated by section rather than by verse some whole verses are missing.

== Jehovah Witnesses ==
Jehovah's Witnesses revised their English New World Translation producing a Kyrgyz "New World Translation", Жаңы дүйнө котормосу.

This was released online on November 9, 2024. The print edition is planned for some time in 2025.

Translation	John 3:16
IBT (Brother Sovet) (1991):	Кудай дүйнөнү ушунча сүйгөндүктөн, Өзүнүн жалгыз Уулун берди, аны менен Ага ишенип калган ар бир адам өлбөсүн, бирок түбөлүк өмүрүнө ээ болсун.
Ray of Hope (2004):	Кудай бул дүйнөнү абдан сүйгөндүктөн, Өзүнүн жалгыз Уулун берди. Кудай Аны Ага ишенген ар бир адам өлбөй, түбөлүк өмүргө ээ болсун деп берди.
Lingua Service (2005):	Кудай адамзатты ушунчалык катуу сүйгөндүктөн, Ага ишенүүчү ар ким өлбөстөн түбөлүк өмүргө ээ болсун деп, Өзүнүн жалгыз Уулун курмандыкка берди.
Askar Mambetaliev	Анткени Кудай бул дүйнөнү ушунчалык катуу сүйгөндүктөн ар бир ишенген адам тозокко түшпөй, тескерисинче түбөлүк өмүрлүү болсун деп жалгыз Уулун курмандыкка берди.
