= Bible translations into Faroese =

The Bible translations into Faroese have been relatively new, partly because the modern orthography began only in the latter half of the 19th century.

== The first translation ==
In 1823, the first translation into Faroese was done on the Book of Matthew by J. H. Schrøter using the phonetic alphabet. Twelve hundred copies of this book were printed by the Danish Bible Society and distributed to all five thousand Faroese people.

== The Later translations ==
In 1843, V. U. Hammershaimb proposed the modern Faroese orthography. He also made translations of parts of the Bible, which he used in his church. In 1892, Fríðrikur Petersen published the Lord's Prayer in Faroese in the church magazine.

Victor Danielsen of the Plymouth Brethren was the first person who completed the Faroese translation of the Bible. Referencing various translations available in Europe, he published the New Testament in 1937, and the Old Testament in 1949. His translation is said to be solid and normal.

In 1961, the Church of the Faroe Islands published the translation of the Bible, from the original Hebrew and Greek texts. It was based on the New Testament translation by Jákup Dahl (completed in 1923) and the Old Testament translation by Kristian Osvald Viderø (completed in 1961). Their translations are said, respectively, to be pretty and faithful to the original, and to be high-level and poetic.

Translation	John 3:16
Unknown source	Tí so elskaði Gud verðina, at hann gav son sín, hin einborna, fyri at hvør tann, sum trýr á hann, ikki skal fortapast, men hava ævigt liv.

== See also ==
- Religion in the Faroe Islands
- Faroe Islanders
- List of Bible translations by language
