= Bible translations into Buryat =

Translation of the Bible to Buryat

The whole Bible in the Mongolian ethnic group in Siberia, the Buryat language was completed at Selenginsk by William Swan and Edward Stallybrass, and printed in Siberia at the joint expense of the American and British and Foreign Bible Societies; but on the suppression of the mission by the Russian Government in 1840, the circulation of the book stopped.

In 1911 Frans Larson and Anton Almblad revised the Gospels and Acts, and in 1913 Genesis and Jonah. These were published by the British and Foreign Bible Society.

The Institute for Bible Translation is now working on a Buryat translation of the Bible, the New Testament was published in 2010.

Translation	John (Иоанн) 3:16
IBT 2010	Юундэб гэбэл, Хүн түрэлхитэнэй Хүбүүндэ этигэгшэдэй хосоронгүй, хэтэ мүнхэдөө амидархынь тула Бурхан хадаа газар дэлхэйн хүнүүдтэ тон ехээр дурлажа, өөрынгөө ори ганса Хүбүүе үргэл болгожо үгөө бшуу.
Transliteration	Yundeb gebel, Hun türelhiteney Hübüünde etigegshedey hosorongüy, hete münhedöö amidarhını tula Burhan hadaa gazar delheyn hünüüdte ton yeheer durlazha, öörıngöö ori gansa Hübüüye ürgel bolgozho ügöö bshuu.
