= Bible translations into Turkmen =

A translation of the Gospel of Matthew was made into Turkmen, by James Bassett (missionary). This was published in 1880. He revised it in 1884 and these were published by the British and Foreign Bible Society.

IBT has published both the New Testament and several Old Testament books in the Turkmen language, as well as a more recent complete translation of the Bible. The first recent publication was in 1994 and was of the New Testament (the 'Injil'), Psalms ('Zebur') and Proverbs (Suleyman's Tymsals) in one hardback volume. This edition was presented to the Language and Literature department of the Academy of Sciences in Ashgabat in November 1995 and was generally well received. It was sold widely on book tables throughout Ashgabat. Since then a paperback version of the New Testament was published, and also the Pentateuch ('Töwrat'), and a new version of Proverbs. The whole Bible is now available online from on the IBT website www.ibt.org.ru and was published in 2016.

In 2019 Jehovah's Witnesses released the complete New World Translation of the Holy Scriptures in the Turkmen language in Istanbul, Turkey.

AfghanBibles.org released the Bible book of Ruth in the Turkmen-Persian script commonly used in Afghanistan. Little is known about the translations or even if a complete Bible is available in the Turkmen-Persian script.

== Comparison ==
Translation	John (Ýohanna) 3:16
Mukaddes Kitap Terjime Instituty, 2016	Hudaý dünýäni örän söýendigi sebäpli Özüniň ýeke-täk Ogluny berdi. Ol muny Ogluna iman edenleriň hiç biri heläk bolman, baky ýaşaýşa gowuşmagy üçin etdi.
Turkmen Truth	«خودای دونیَه‌دَکیلِری قاتی کَن سُیِندیگی اوچین اُزونینگ یِکِجه اُغلونی بِردی. اُل مونی اُغلونا ایمان گِتیرِنلِرینگ هیچ بیری هِلَک بُلمان، اِبِدی یاشایشا قاووشماغی اوچین اِتدی.
New World Translation of the Holy Scriptures, 2019	Hudaý adamlarya şeýle güýçli söýýär welin, olar üçin ýeke-täk Ogluny berdin, sebäbi Hudaý Ogluna iman eden her bir adamyň heläk bolman, ebedi ýaşaýşa gowuşmagyny isleýärň
