= Bible translations into the languages of Russia =

Traditionally Russia used the Old Church Slavonic language and Slavonic Bible, and in the modern era Bible translations into Russian. The minority languages of Russia usually have a much more recent history, many of them having been commissioned or updated by the Institute for Bible Translation.

Bible translations into the languages of Russia include:

== Avar ==
The Bible is being translated into Avar language (North Caucasian) of the Caucasus by the Institute for Bible Translation. The first portion in Avar, John, was published in 1979, Mark followed in 1996, Luke and Acts in 2000, Proverbs in 2005, the complete New Testament in September 2008, and Genesis in 2011. Work on the Old Testament continues.

== Bashkir ==
N. Bobnikrov supervised a translation of the four gospels into Bashkir. This was published by the British and Foreign Bible Society in 1902. The Institute for Bible Translation is currently working on a new translation. The New Testament is almost ready to be published.

Translation	John 3:16
BFBS 1902	Анын ӧсӧн Хоӟай донйаны шул тикте йаратты, ул ӱӟене йангыӟ тыуган Улын, Ага эшӓнеӱсе ѓӓр-кем ѓа лӓк булмаѓын, мӓҥѓе теректек алѓын, тиб бирӟе.
Modern	Анын өсөн Хоҙай донъяны шул тикте яратты, ул үҙене яңғыҙ тыуған Улын, Аға эшәнеүсе һәр-кем һа ләк булмаһын, мәңге тереклек алһын, тиб бирҙе.

== Chuvash ==
A new translation into the Chuvash language was initiated by the Russian Bible Society in the 1990s, coordinating New Testament translation carried out by the Baptist churches and the Old Testament translation carried out by the Russian Orthodox Church. The completed Bible translation was published in 2009.

Translation	John (Иоанн) 3:16
British and Foreign Bible Society, 1911	Турӑ Тӗнҕене пит йуратнӑ: Хӑйӗн пертен пӗр ывӑлне те панӑ: Ӑна ӗненекенсем пӗри те ан пӗтҕӗр, ӗмӗрлӗх пурӑнӑҫла пулҕҕӑр, тенӗ.
IBT, 2009	Тӗнчене питӗ юратнӑран Турӑ Хӑйӗн пӗртен-пӗр Тӑван Ывӑлне панӑ. Ҫакна Вӑл ӗненекенӗсем пӗри те ан пӗтчӗр тесе, ӗмӗрлӗх пурӑнӑҫлӑ пулччӑр тесе тунӑ.

== Crimean Tatar ==
A portion of the Bible was first published in Crimean Tatar by the British and Foreign Bible Society prior to 1912. The Institute for Bible translation has been translating the Bible into Modern Crimean Tatar. Jonah was published in 1978, Matthew in 1985, Luke, John, Acts and James in 1996, Matthew again in 2006, Proverbs and Ecclesiastes in 2007, the four gospels and Acts in 2008, Genesis, Exodus and Deuteronomy in 2009 and Psalms in 2011.

Translation	John (Юхан) 3:16
BFBS (pre 1912)	زيرا اللە دنيايى شوياە سوديكە كندو بريجل اوغين ويردى تاكە ھر آڭا اينانان ھلاڪ اولميا امّا ابدى خياتە مالڪ اولا.
IBT 2008	Чюнки Алла дюньяны ойле севди ки, Озюнинъ бирден-бир огълуны берди, Онъа инангъан эр бир адам гъайып олмасын, лякин эбедий омюрни алсын.

== Koryak ==
The first portion of the Bible in Koryak language (Chukotko-Kamchatkan family), selections from Luke, was published by Institute for Bible Translation in 1995. This was followed by the whole gospel in 2005, and the first 17 verses of John in 2008.

- Koryak Gospel of Luke

== Komi ==
The first full Bible in the Komi language was issued in 1823 in Saint-Petersburg by the Russian Bible Society. There were also the 1885 edition of the Bible and a translation of the New Testament made in 1970-80s. Though these three editions gave rise to complaints and in 2008 the Institute for Bible Translation issued a modern translation of the Bible.

== Kryashen ==
Nikolay Ilminsky, a Russian Orthodox priest and missionary, was the first who greatly promoted translations of the Bible into the minority languages of the Russian Empire including the Tatar dialect of the Christianized Tatars, called the Kryashens. He and his colleagues translated and issued the Gospels (1891), the Psalter (1892), and the Epistles (1907), though the full translation was not completed. Unlike the dialect of the Muslim Tatars, who used the Arabic scripts then, the Kryashen dialect (language) has used and still uses its own version of the Cyrillic alphabet, which slightly differs from the modern Standard (Kazan) Tatar alphabet, and also has minor peculiarities in vocabulary and grammar. In 2005 the Russian Bible Society published a modern translation of the New Testament in Kryashen.

== Kumyk ==
Hassan Beg Effendi Mutsaloff's gospel of Matthew in Kumyk was published in 1888, followed by Mark in 1897.

The Institute of Bible Translations New Testament was published in 2007. Genesis and Proverbs followed in 2008.

Translation	John (Югьан) 3:16
Institute for Bible Translation 2007	Аллагь дюньяны олай сюе чи, Оьзюню биргине-бир Уланын огъар берип къойду. Уланына иман салагъан гьар ким оьлмесин учун, даимлик яшав алсын учун, О шолай этди.

== Shor ==
Shor is a Turkic language spoken by about 10,000 people in the Kemerovo Province in south-central Siberia. The Institute for Bible Translation published the first Bible portion in Shor language, Luke 2:1-20 in 2000. In 2004 they published Mark, and in 2008 John 1:1-17. The full gospel of John was published in 2011.

== Tatar ==
The New Testament in the Kryashen dialect of the Tatar language was first issued at the end of the 19th century. Mirza Farukh was co-translator with Karl Pfander and Felix Zaremba (1794–1874). (see above). The Institute for Bible Translation is working on a modern translation, the New Testament of which has already been published. Jehovah's Witnesses have published Инҗил. Яңа дөнья тәрҗемәсе, a translation of the Christian Greek Scriptures (the New Testament).

Translation	John 3:16
IBT Modern translation	Чөнки Аллаһы дөньяны шулкадәр яратты ки, Улына иман китерүче беркем һәлак булмасын өчен, бәлки мәңгелек тормыш алсын өчен, Үзенең бердәнбер Улын бирде.
Transliteration	Śönki Allahı dön'yanı šulkadär yarattı ki, Ulına iman kiterüśe berkem hälak bulmasın öśen, bälki mäŋgelek tormıš alsın öśen, Üzeneŋ berdänber Ulın birde.
Инҗил. Яңа дөнья тәрҗемәсе	Чөнки Аллаһы дөньяны шулкадәр ярата ки, Улына иман итүче беркем һәлак булмасын өчен, ә мәңгелек тормыш алсын өчен, үзенең бердәнбер Улын бирде.

== Tuvan ==
The Institute for Bible Translation has published a Tuvan translation of the Bible. They published Mark in 1996, Luke and Acts in 1997, the whole New Testament in 2001, Ruth, Esther, Jonah and Lamentations in 2003, and the Pentateuch, Proverbs and Psalms in 2005. The complete Bible was published in 2011.

Translation	John (Иоанның) 3:16
Institute for Bible Translation (2001)	Оглунга бүзүрээн кижи бүрүзү өлбезин, харын мөнге амыдыралдыг болзун дээш, Бурган Бодунуң эр чаңгыс Оглун берипкен. Ооң бо делегейниң улузунга ынакшылы ол хире болган-дыр.
Transliteration	Oglunga büzüreen kiži bürüzü ölbezin, xarın mönge amıdıraldıg bolzun deeš, Burgan Bodunuŋ er čaŋgıs Oglun beripken. Ooŋ bo delegeyniŋ uluzunga ınakšılı ol xire bolgan-dır.

== Sakha ==
An edition of the Gospels into the Sakha language (Yakut language) was prepared by the Kazan Missionary Society at the expense of the British and Foreign Bible Society, two were finished in 1897. The four gospels were completed in June 1898, and an edition of 3,000 was printed at Kazan.

Currently a new full translation of the Bible sponsored by the International Bible Society is being done by the well-known writer Nikolai Luginov, with assistance from a professional translator, Aita Shaposnikova. The New Testament was published in 2004 and reprinted in 2008. The psalms were published in January 2010.

Translation	John 3:16
International Bible Society, 2008	Таҥара бу аан дойдуну ол курдук таптаан, Бэйэтин Төрөппүт Соҕотох Уолун, Кинини итэҕэйэр ханнык баҕарар киһи өлбөтүн, бараммат олохтонорун туһугар, биэрбитэ».
Transliteration	Taŋara bu aan doydunu ol kurduk taptaan, Beyetin Töröppüt Soğotox Uolun, Kinini iteğeyer xannık bağarar kihi ölbötün, barammat oloxtonorun tuhugar bierbite.
Kazan, 1898	Тан̨ара а̄н дойдуну солкурдук тапта̄быта, арай Бӓйӓтін соб соготох тӧро̄бӱт Уолун, бары Кініӓхӓ ітӓгӓйӓччі ол́бӧтӱн, хата ӧрӱтӱн ты̄нна̄х буоллун діӓн, а̄н дойдуга біӓрбітӓ.

- Pdf New Testament from IBT

== See also ==
- Bible translations into the languages of Europe
