= Bible translations into Uzbek =

The Bible has been fully translated into Uzbek. The full text was made publicly available for the first time September 29, 2011.

Scripture portions were first translated in 1886, with Gospels translated by M. Ostrumoff, Russian Inspector of Schools. The proof-sheets were revised by Dr. Radlof, Rev. A. Amirkhaniantz, of Tiflis, and Dr. Sauerwein. Because of orthography issues it took a long time for their work to be published, Luke was only published in 1890, the Four Gospels being completed in 1891.

In 1917 the Gospels were published in the Uzbek-Arabic script and an affiliate of the International Bible Society set up in Tashkent the capital.

During the period of Soviet rule little further translations were made.

Following Independence in 1991 the Bible Society was reconstituted in 1993. With the help of the United Bible Societies and Institute for Bible Translation it began to translate the whole Bible into modern Uzbek using the Cyrillic alphabet. After 2000 most portions were published in both Cyrillic and Latin scripts.

Jehovah's Witnesses released a translation of the New Testament in modern Uzbek in 2010.

In 2017 the New World Translation of the Holy Scriptures was released in the Uzbek Language. The Uzbek language Bible is one of the few Bible covers of the NWT that has a traditional cover reflecting Uzbek culture.

As the Uzbek language script is changing and many young ones are not familiar with the Cyrillic script, in 2018 Jehovah's Witnesses released the Uzbek language New World Translation of the Holy Scriptures in the Latin script.

Translation	John 3:16
BFBS 1891	زيراكە خدا دنيانى شونداق سويدى اوزينينك يالغۇز توققان اوغلى نى بركونچە تاكيم ھر ﺁنكا ايمان كيلتور كوچى ھلاك بولماغاى بلكە حيات جاويدانى نى تاپقاى.
BFBS 1891 (transliterated)	Zeroki Xudo dunyoni shundaq sevdi O'zining yolg'iz O'g'lini berkuncha tokim har Unga imon qilturguvchi halok bo'lmag'ay, balki hayat javidonini topgay.
Injil 2008 (IBT)	Zero Xudo olamni shunchalik sevdiki, O‘zining yagona O‘g‘lini berdi, toki Unga ishongan har bir kishi halok bo‘lmasin, balki abadiy hayotga ega bo‘lsin.
New Testament Uzbek 2010	
Муқаддас Китоб — Янги дунё таржимаси 2017/2018 (Jehovah's Wittneses)	Аллоҳ инсониятни шу қадар қаттиқ севдики, ҳатто улар учун ягона Ўғлини берди. Токи унга ишонган ҳар бир киши ҳалок бўлмасин, балки мангу ҳаётга эга бўлсин. Alloh insoniyatni shu qadar qattiq sevdiki, hatto ular uchun yagona O‘g‘lini berdi. Toki unga ishongan har bir kishi halok bo‘lmasin, balki mangu hayotga ega bo‘lsin.
Muqaddes Kitob 2020 (IBT/UBS)	Zero Xudo olamni shunchalik sevdiki, O‘zining yagona O‘g‘lini berdi. Toki Unga ishonganlardan birontasi halok bo‘lmasin, balki abadiy hayotga ega bo‘lsin.

== Printed Portions and dates ==
- 1981 John
- 1983 Genesis & John
- 1986 Four Gospels
- 1992 NT, Genesis, Psalms (Injil (3rd ed.). Turkija Mukaddas Kitob Djamoati. 1996. p. 950. ISBN 5-85524-025-8.)
- 1996 Children's Bible (Muqaddas Kitob bolalar uchun coddalashtirib hikoya qilingan (3rd ed.). Turkija Mukaddas Kitob Djamoati. 1997. p. 438.)
- 1998 Proverbs (Cyr/Rom) 2000, 2004 (Sulaimoning Hikmatlari Uzbekcsaga (1st ed.). Bible Society. 1998. p. 80. ISBN 978-5-89116-058-3.)
- 2001 Ruth, Esther, Jonah (Cyr/Rom), 2004
- 2003 1-2 Samuel, 1-2 Kings, Daniel (Cyr/Rom)
- 2003 Ecclesiastes (Cyr/Rom)
- 2006 Genesis, Exodus, Numbers, Joshua, Judges
- 2008 Ingil
- 2010 New Testament
- 2017 Complete Bible Cyrillic Script
- 2018 Complete Bible Latin Script
