= Bible translations into Armenian =

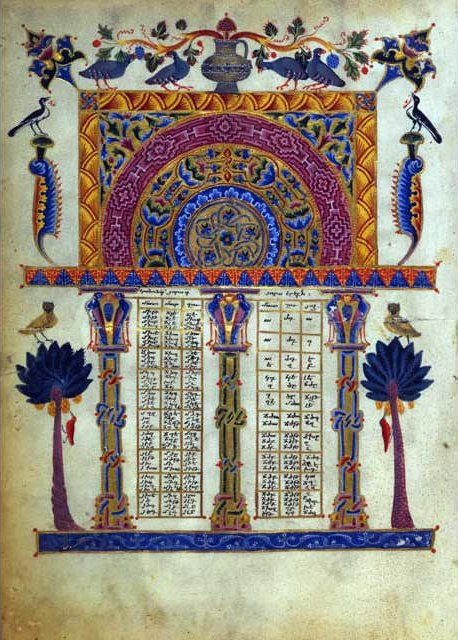
Illustrated Armenian Bible from 1256

The Bible (Armenian: Աստուածաշունչ, lit. 'Breath of God') has been translated to Armenian since the beginning of the fifth century.

The invention of the Armenian alphabet by Mesrop Mashtots and Isaac of Armenia in 405 AD for lack of an alphabet sufficient for translating Christian scripture into. The earliest translation was Mesrop's early fifth century translation. According to Moses of Chorene, Isaac of Armenia made a translation of the Bible from the Syriac text about the year 411. This work was insufficient, and soon afterwards Mesrop's pupils were sent to Edessa to translate the scriptures. They journeyed as far as Constantinople and brought back with them authentic copies of the Greek text. With the help of other copies obtained from Alexandria, the Bible was translated again from the Greek according to the text of the Septuagint and Origen's Hexapla. This version, now in use in the Armenian Church, was completed around the year 434. The decrees of the first three councils — Nicæa, Constantinople, and Ephesus — and the national liturgy (so far written in Syriac) were also translated into Armenian, the latter being revised on the liturgy of St. Basil, though retaining characteristics of its own.

The first sentence in Armenian written down by St. Mesrop after he invented the Armenian alphabet is said to be the opening line of Solomon's Book of Proverbs:

Ճանաչել զիմաստութիւն եւ զխրատ, իմանալ զբանս հանճարոյ:

Čanačʿel zimastutʿiwn ew zxrat, imanal zbans hančaroy.

"To know wisdom and instruction; to perceive the words of understanding."

— Book of Proverbs, 1:2.

These translations were translated to Classical Armenian. There have been multiple translations into Armenian since then, including into Modern Armenian.

== See also ==
- Biblical canon § Canons of various Christian traditions
- Development of the New Testament canon § Armenian canon
- List of Bible translations by language
