= Bible translations into constructed languages =

The Bible or parts thereof has been translated into conlangs (constructed languages) including Esperanto, Ido, Klingon, Láadan, LOLcat, Na'vi, Quenya, Toki Pona, Volapük, and other languages.

== Ido ==
Ido is a constructed language and an offshoot of Esperanto. Some books have been translated into Ido such as the Book of Psalms, and the Gospel of Luke.

== Klingon ==
- Klingon Bible Translation Project on KLI.org
- Religious Text Translation Project on the Klingon Language wiki

Although the Klingon language was invented for the Star Trek television and film series', Klingon characters are not seen referring to the Bible.

Co-ordinated by Melanie Roney, the KBTP has assumed the immense task of translating the books of the Bible, both the Old and New Testaments, into Klingon. Promoted by the Klingon Language Institute (whose goals do not include missionary work, but this project was considered worthy of KLI's efforts for purely secular reasons).

NSKOL has published two volumes containing several portions of the Bible translated. One can find online the following specimen:

Translation	Psalm 117
K'mel	joH'a' yInaD Hoch qorDu'pu' yIquvmoH Hoch ghotpu' numuSHa'qu'mo' 'ej reH taHtaH vItDaj. joH'a' yInaD !'

The linguist Nick Nicholas has also translated the Gospel of Mark into Klingon. Link

== Láadan ==
Láadan is a constructed women's language from Suzette Haden Elgin's Native Tongue trilogy. In a fictional future in which the United States Constitution's Nineteenth Amendment has been repealed, and women no longer have the rights of adults, a group of women has constructed a language to express women's thoughts and experiences more adeptly than can the languages of male-dominated society. In the second book of the series, The Judas Rose, the constructors of Láadan use Thursday-night women's prayer services beyond their own households. Part of this task involves translating the King James Version into Láadan. A portion of Psalm 23, verse 5 is translated with cultural shifts:

Translation	Psalm 23:5
Láadan	...Boóbin Na delith lethath oma Nathanan...
Literal translation	...Thou braidest my hair with Thine own hands...

The King James Version reads, here, "…thou anointest my head with oil…"

== LOLcat ==
The LOLCat Bible Translation Project is a wiki-based website where editors aim to parody the entire Bible in "LOLspeak", the slang popularized by the LOLcat Internet phenomenon. LOLspeak has been called "kitty pidgin" and also been likened to baby talk. The project relies on contributors to adapt passages. As of March 27, 2008, approximately 61% of the text had been adapted.

Translation	John 3:16
Various	"So liek teh Ceiling Kitteh lieks teh ppl lots and he sez 'Oh hai I givez u me only kitteh and ifs u beleeves him u wont evr diez no moar, kthxbai!'"

== Na'vi ==
Naʼvi is the constructed language of the Naʼvi, the sapient humanoid indigenous inhabitants of the fictional moon Pandora in the 2009 film Avatar and sequels. It was created by Paul Frommer, a professor at the USC Marshall School of Business with a doctorate in linguistics.

Work on the Naʼvi language has continued even after the film's release. In 2009, its creator, Paul Frommer, was working on a compendium which he planned to deliver to Fox in the near future. He think that the language "[has] a life of its own," and thinks it's "wonderful" that the language has developed a following, as is evident through the increasing learner community of the language.

- Na'vi Bible Translation Project

Translation	John 3:16
Various	Fìfya kifkey leru yawne Yawäru, alunta pol tolìng 'awa 'itanit sneyä, fte pori fratìspusaw ke tiverkup, ki fìfrapor livu tìrey frakrr.

== Quenya ==
Quenya is a fictional language devised by J. R. R. Tolkien. Various parts of the Bible have been translated into Neo-Quenya, an attempt at editing a unified Quenya from Tolkien's evolving and sometimes contradictory ideas about the language. Helge Fauskanger has translated the New Testament and is currently translating the Old Testament. Psalm 130 has also been translated by people on the website Aglardh.

Translation	John 3:16 (Yohannëo 3:16)
Fauskanger	An Eru emélië i mar tenna antië ernóna Yondorya, i ilquen ye savë sessë lá nauva nancarna, mal samuva oira coivië.

== Toki Pona ==
Toki Pona is a philosophical artistic constructed language known for its small vocabulary, simplicity, and ease of acquisition. There is an ongoing Bible translation project on GitHub and Discord.

== Volapük ==
Volapük is a constructed language created in 1879 and 1880 by Johann Martin Schleyer, a Roman Catholic priest in Baden, Germany, who believed that God told him to create an international language.

1880 Schleyer Volapük	1930 de Jong Volapük
O Fat obas, kel binol in süls,	O Fat obas, kel binol in süls!
paisaludomöz nem ola!	Nem olik pasalüdükonöd!
Kömomöd monargän ola!	Regän ola kömonöd!
Jenomöz vil olik, äs in sül, i su tal!	Vil olik jenonöd, äsä in sül, i su tal!
Bodi obsik vädeliki givolös obes adelo!	Givolös obes adelo bodi aldelik obsik!
E pardolös obes debis obsik,	E pardolös obes döbotis obsik,
äs id obs aipardobs debeles obas.	äsä i obs pardobs utanes, kels edöbons kol obs.
E no obis nindukolös in tendadi;	E no blufodolös obis,
sod aidalivolös obis de bad.	ab livükolös obis de bad!
	(Ibä dutons lü ol regän, e nämäd e glor jü ün laidüp.)
Jenosöd!	So binosös!

The New Testament (Diatek Nulik) in Volapük is available on Wikisource.

== See also ==
- I Can Eat Glass
