= William Tolfrey =

British civil servant and translator

William Tolfrey (1778 – 4 January 1817, in Colombo) was a British civil servant in Ceylon (now Sri Lanka) and translator of the Bible into Sinhalese. The BFBS revised his translation from 1895 to 1910.

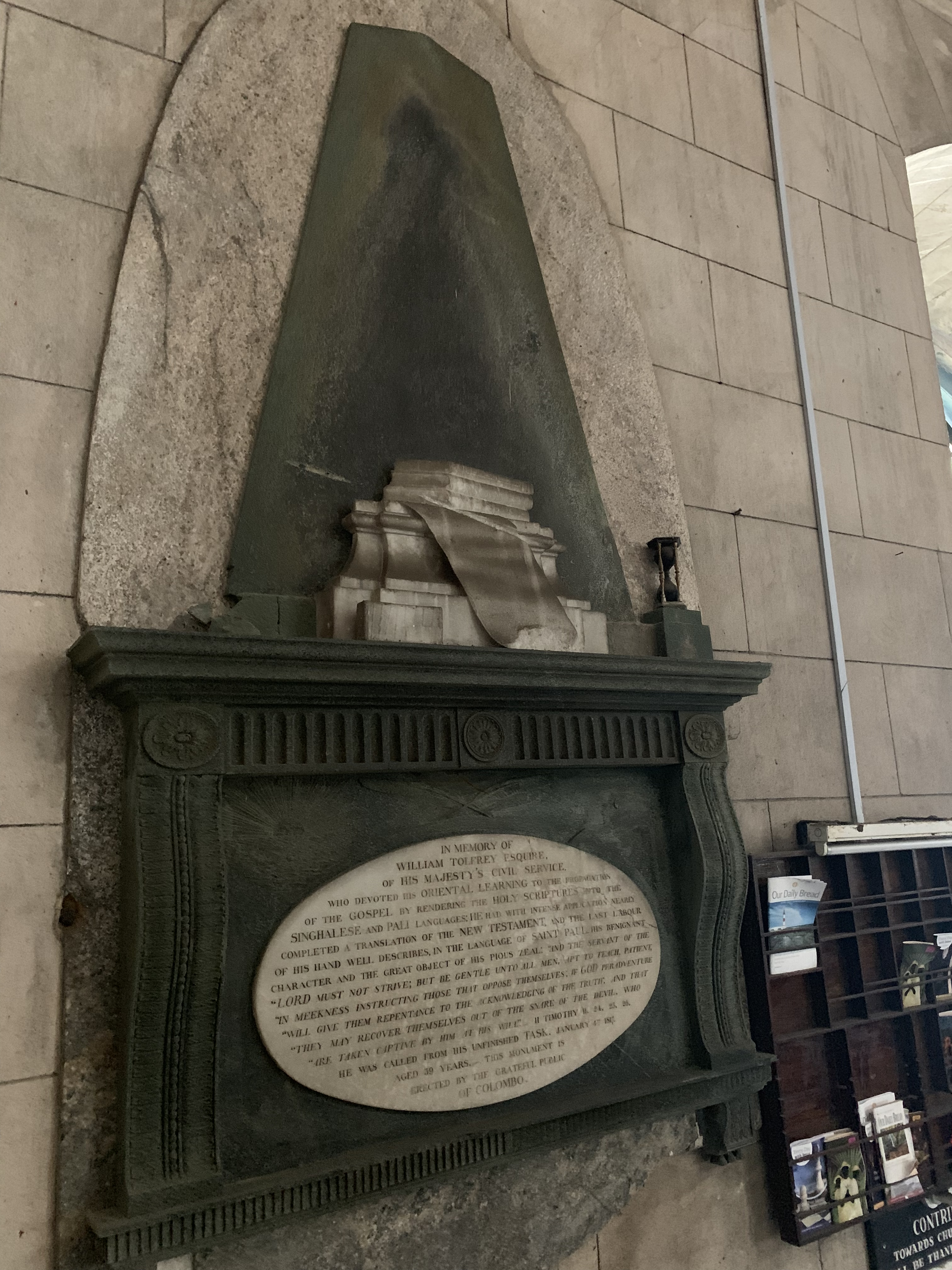

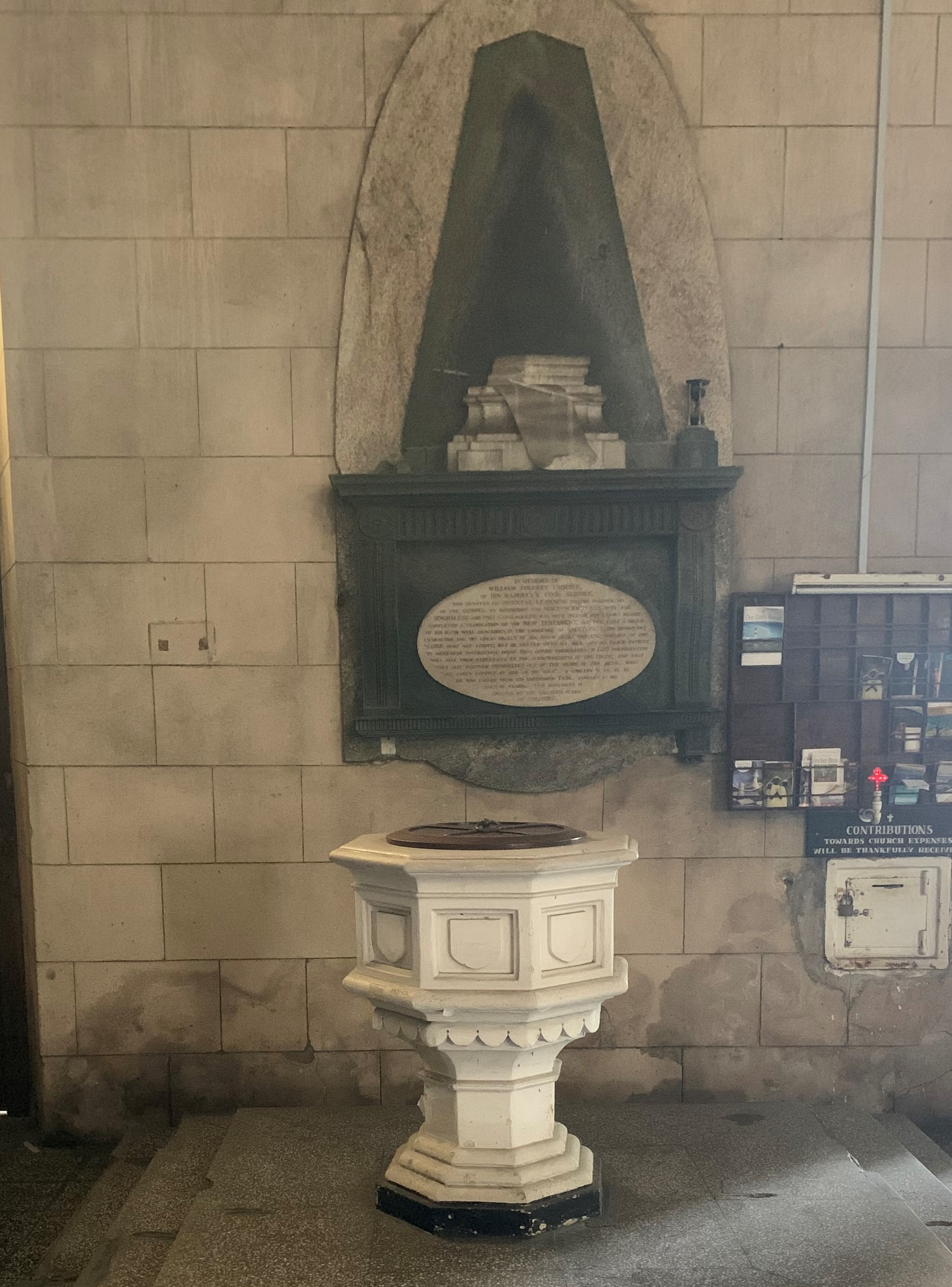

== Life ==
Born about 1778, he was educated in England. Going in 1794 to Calcutta, where his father was living, he had a subordinate post in a public official but gave it up for an ensigncy in the 76th (Foot) Regiment. Promoted into the 74th Regiment, he served in the Fourth Anglo-Mysore War under General George Harris, and in the Second Anglo-Maratha War campaigns of 1803 and 1804. He was distinguished also in the battle of Assaye.

In 1805 he sold his commission, and, visiting an uncle, Samuel Tolfrey, in Ceylon, obtained a post in the public service there in 1806. In 1813 he was assistant commissioner of revenue and commerce, and shortly afterwards proficiency in Sinhalese obtained him the post of chief translator to the resident at Kandy. On the arrival of Sir Robert Brownrigg as governor in 1812, a Bible society was started, and Tolfrey undertook the revision of the old Sinhalese translation of the Bible made by the Dutch. Tolfrey died in Ceylon on 4 January 1817.

== Works ==
An early English student of classical Pali, Tolfrey found the existing Sinhalese Bible translation too colloquial, and translated each verse into Pali as he worked. At the time of his death, he had nearly completed the translation of the New Testament into Pali, a work which was subsequently printed. Benjamin Clough used Tolfrey's materials for the compilation of his Pali grammar, produced in 1824.
