= Bible translations into creole languages =

Overview of creole language Bible translations

The creole languages include Dutch-based creole languages, English-based creole languages and French-based creole languages. Major Bible translations into creole languages include:

== Gullah ==
The effort to translate the Bible into Gullah, a creole language spoken by residents of the Sea Islands off the eastern coast of the southern United States, began in 1979 with a team of Gullah speakers from the Penn Center. They were assisted by Pat and Claude Sharpe, translation consultants for Wycliffe Bible Translators. Pat Sharpe died in 2002, and was replaced by David and Lynn Frank. The gospels of Luke and John were released in 1995 and 2003, while the New Testament was released in 2005.

Translation	John 3:16
De Nyew Testament	Cause God lobe all de people een de wol so much dat e gii we e onliest Son. God sen we um so dat ebrybody wa bleebe on um ain gwine ded. Dey gwine libe fa true faeba mo.

== Haitian Creole ==
One Haitian Creole Bible "Bib La", sponsored by the Société Biblique Haïtienne (Haitian Bible Society; part of the United Bible Societies), was published in 1985 by the American Bible Society, with an updated version in 1999. Bibles International published another translation of the New Testament in 2002, additional printings in 2007 and 2016. The Old Testament is still being translated, with an expected completion date in the 2030s.

Translation	John 3:16
1985	Paske, Bondye sitèlman renmen lèzòm li bay sèl Pitit li a pou yo. Tout moun ki va mete konfyans yo nan li p'ap pedi lavi yo. Okontrè y'a gen lavi ki p'ap janm fini an.

== Jamaican Creole ==
Di Jamiekan Nyuu Testiment, published in 2012 by the Bible Society of the West Indies, was the first translation of the New Testament into Jamaican Patois. It represented a significant break from tradition within Jamaica, where the King James Version of the Bible had long been dominant. In addition to its role as a Bible, the Society's goal with the translation was also to improve the perception of Jamaican Patois within Jamaican society.

Translation	John 3:16
2012	Kaa, yu si, Gad lov di worl so moch dat im gi op im wan dege-dege Bwai Pikni, so enibadi we chos iina im naa go ded bot a-go liv fi eva.
