= Bible translations into the languages of France =

== Arpitan ==
Peter Waldo, was the first to commission a Bible translation into a modern vernacular language in the late 1170s with his translation of the New Testament into Franco-Provençal.

== Norman ==
Portions of the Bible have been translated into the island dialects of Norman.

=== Guernésiais ===
George Métivier translated the Gospel of Matthew into Guernésiais and it was published in London in 1863. This is now available online.

Thomas Martin translated the whole Bible into Guernésiais and this has never been published.

=== Jèrriais ===
Only selected passages from the Bible have been translated into Jèrriais, the form of the Norman language spoken in Jersey, in the Channel Islands, off the coast of France, in Europe.

| Translation | John (Jean) 3:16 |
|---|---|
| Lé Nouvieau Testament | Car Dgieu aimait tant l'monde qu'i' donnit san seul Fis, à seule fîn qu'touos les cheins tchi craient en li n'péthissent pon, mais qu'il aient la vie êtèrnelle. |

=== Sercquiais ===
A translation of the Parable of the Sower (Parabol du smeaux) was transcribed and published by Louis Lucien Bonaparte in 1863.

== Occitan and Provençal ==
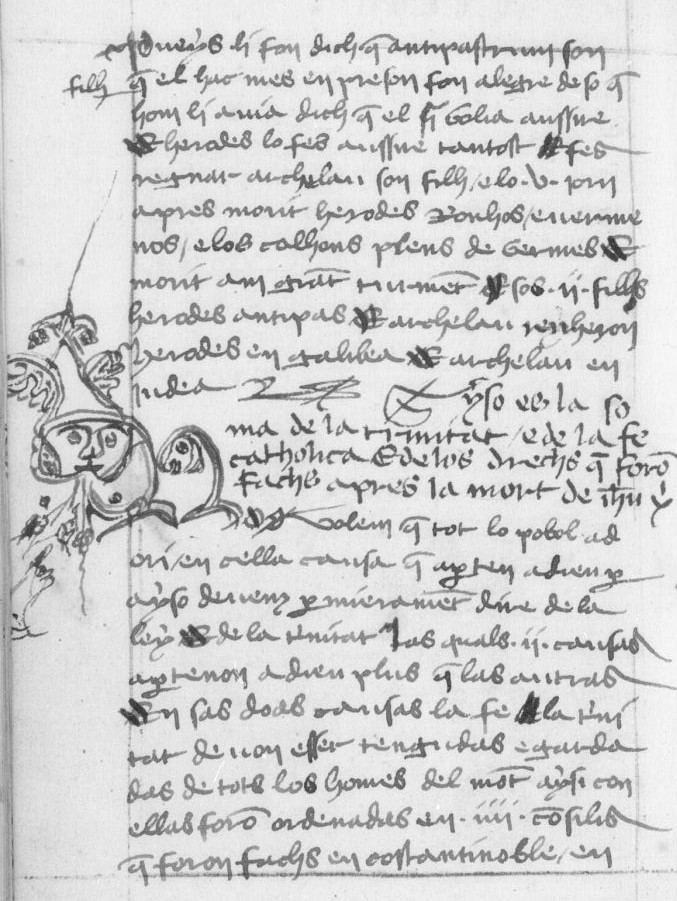
Page from a medieval Occitan Old Testament (BnF fr. 2426)

- Le Nouveau Testament traduit au XIIIe siècle en langue provençale suivi d'un rituel cathare, published manuscript of a 13th-century translation of the New Testament (Paris: Ernest Leroux, 1887)
- The Acre Bible was translated into Occitan in Paris, Bibliothèque nationale de France, MS fr. 2426
- Lou Libre de Toubìo, Provençal translation of the Book of Tobit by "lou Felibre d'Entre-Mount" (Aix: Sardat fils, 1880)
- Sants Evangèlis, translated to Occitan by Juli Cubaines (Toloza: Societat d'Estudis Occitans, 1931)
- Evangèli segon sant Mateu, Gascon translation by Miquèu Grosclaude (Pau: Per Noste, 1995)
- Nau testament, New Testament translation into Aranese dialect (Vall d'Aran: Archiprestat d'Aran-Avescat Urgelh, 2010).
- La Bíblia: Ancian Testament the Old testament translated into Occitan by fr:Joan Larzac (Toulouse: Letras d'òc, 2013).
- La Bíblia, Nouveau Testament the New Testament translated into Occitan by fr:Joan Larzac (Toulouse: Letras d'òc, 2016).
