= Bible translations into Pashto =

There are some Bible translations into Pashto, a language spoken in Pakistan and Afghanistan. Full translations were published in 1895, 1991 (by the Pakistan Bible Society), and 2019 (printed by the United Bible Societies).

== Early translation work ==
The New Testament was first published in the Pashto language in 1818 in Serampore, India. The translation process continued over may years, and the first complete Bible finally became available in 1895.

== Modern translation ==
In 1991 the Pakistan Bible Society produced a modern New Testament in a general Pashto dialect, most recently revised in 1996. The affectionately known "little blue" book was reprinted several times but a full Bible was not completed in its mixed dialect, with subsequent translation efforts instead focussing on dialects dominant in Pakistan and Afghanistan separately.

In 2019, a full Bible in Pashto was completed, in the Yusufzai dialect most commonly spoken in Pakistan. This was put into print in 2020 by the United Bible Societies.

Work on the Afghan dialects of Pashto continues, with some books being published online as the translation work proceeds.
