= Bible translations into Sorbian =

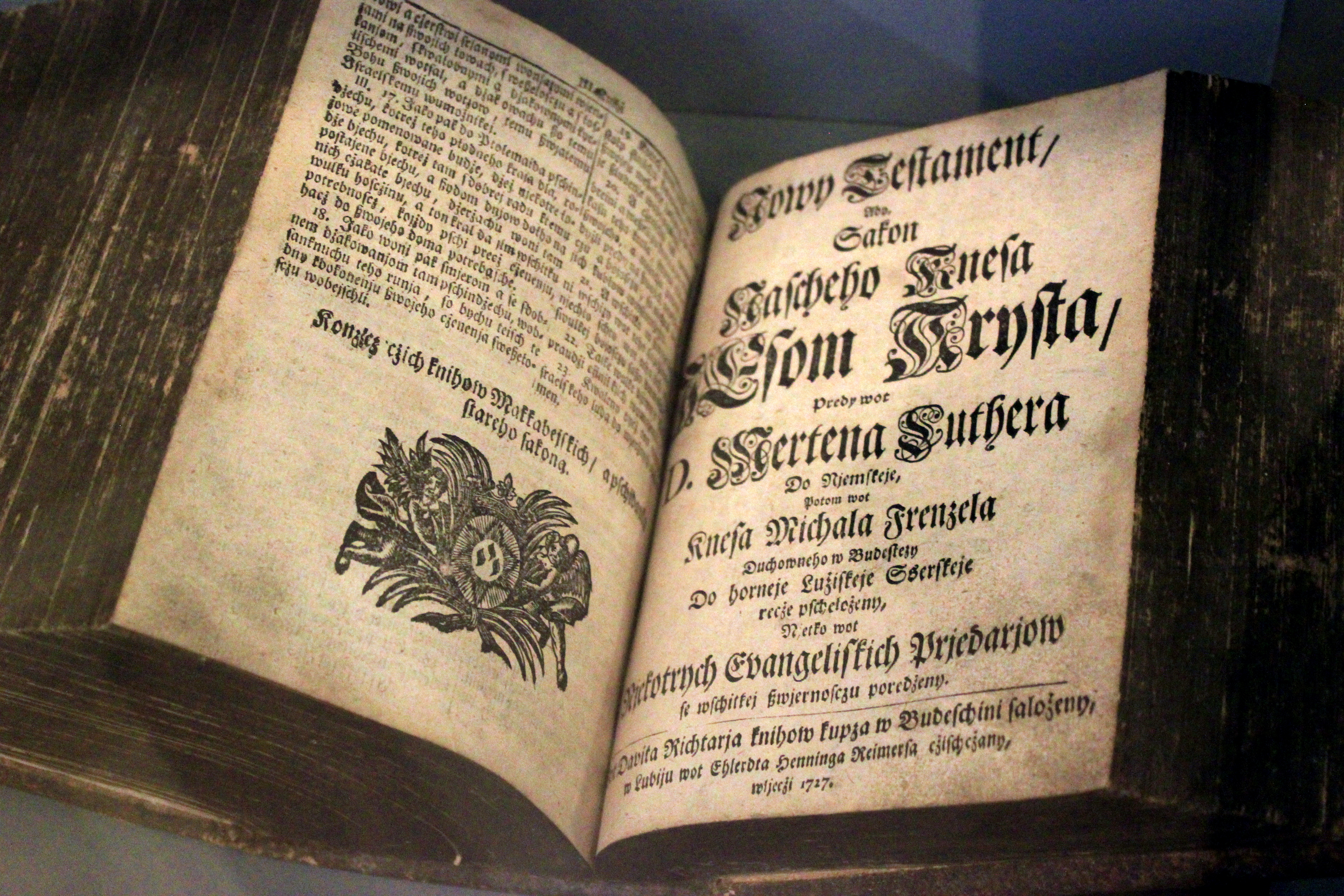
Sorbian translation of the New Testament by Michał Frencel, 1717

Bible translations into Sorbian have a long history with the oldest translation published in 1547. Martin Luther's translation of the Bible contributed to the development of a national written German language by bringing together the various German dialects. Likewise, translations of the Bible into Upper and Lower Sorbian helped preserve and develop the Sorbian language and culture, particularly through the emergence of religious literature.

The distinct characteristics of the two Sorbian languages and the differing religious affiliations among the Upper Sorbs led to the emergence of three separate Bible translation traditions after the Reformation.

== Lower Sorbian ==
The oldest Sorbian Bible version, that of the New Testament of 1547, is extant in a manuscript in the Royal Library at Berlin. In the mid-16th century, Mikławš Jakubica translated the New Testament into an eastern Lower Sorbian dialect, while an anonymous translator rendered the Psalms into a western Lower Sorbian dialect. Like another New Testament translation produced in Lower Lusatia at the end of the 17th century, both manuscripts remained unpublished. The latter was edited and published by Heinz Schuster-Šewc in 1996 as the Kraków or Berlin Manuscript. The only printed work during this period was the collectively translated Extracta aus der heiligin Schrift Alten und Neuen Testaments ("Extracts from the Holy Scriptures of the Old and New Testaments"), published in 1656 in the Electoral Brandenburg Wendish District.

It was not until the 18th century that several noblemen connected with leading Pietists at the Prussian royal court and in Halle—including Gottfried Wilhelm Leibniz, Daniel Ernst Jablonski, Philipp Jacob Spener, and August Hermann Francke—promoted the publication of theological works in Lower Sorbian.

Johann Gottlieb Fabricius, a graduate of Halle originally from Schwerin an der Warthe (today Skwierzyna, Poland), became pastor in Kahren near Cottbus in 1702. By his own admission, he knew neither Polish nor Sorbian when he arrived, and learned Lower Sorbian from Pastor Johann Korn Sr. of Papitz. Already in 1706, Fabricius published the Small Catechism in Lower Sorbian in Cottbus. He then collaborated with Christoph Ermel, archdeacon of the Cottbus monastery church, to revise an anonymous Lower Sorbian translation of the New Testament. It was printed in 1709 in a printing press specially established in Kahren and was reprinted four times in the same year. At Fabricius's request, King Frederick I of Prussia financed the printing. With the support of the Prussian Main Bible Society, several further editions of the New Testament were published.

An anonymous translation of the Book of Sirach appeared in 1754 (reprinted in 1769), followed in 1764 by an anonymous translation of the Psalms differing from Fabricius's version. The first complete Lower Sorbian translation of the Old Testament, produced independently of the earlier partial translations, was completed in 1796 by Jan Bjedrich Fryco (Johann Friedrich Fritze), pastor of Kolkwitz. His work had a decisive influence on the development of written Lower Sorbian.

After Jan Zygmunt Bjedrich Šyndlaŕ (Jan Zygmunt Friedrich Schindler) revised the Old Testament, the Holy Scriptures were first published as a complete Bible in 1824, combining Fabricius's 1822 New Testament with Fryco's Old Testament. The complete Lower Sorbian Bible was published together in a single volume only once more, in 1868.

In 2018, the Cottbus branch of the Sorbian Institute, together with the Association for the Promotion of the Wendish Language in the Church, published an online edition of the historical text in three versions.

== Upper Sorbian ==
=== Protestant translations ===
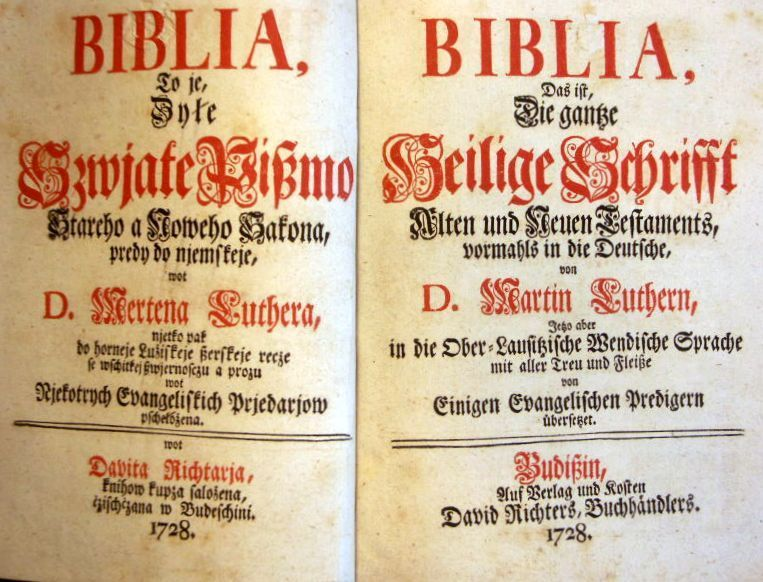
Bilingual title page of the first complete Bible translation in the Upper Sorbian from the year 1728

Michał Frencel (Michael Frenzel (d. 1706)), pastor of Großpostwitz, was the first person in Upper Lusatia to devote himself systematically to translating the Bible, thereby laying the foundation for the Upper Sorbian written language. His translations of the Gospels of Matthew and Mark were printed in 1670. Frencel's preference for Czech spelling provoked controversy among Protestant clergy influenced by Zacharias Běrlink (Zacharias Bierling), who favored the traditional orthography.

The influence of the Pietists led the estates to finance Sorbian theological publications. In 1690 they appointed a translation committee of five pastors (excluding Frencel). Soon afterward appeared an Upper Sorbian catechism (1693), a lectionary containing Epistles and Gospels (1695), and a church agenda (1696). These translations were based not only on Luther's Bible but also on the Greek original and on Slavic Bibles, including the Slovenian Bible of 1584, the Czech Bible of 1613, and the Polish Bible of 1660.

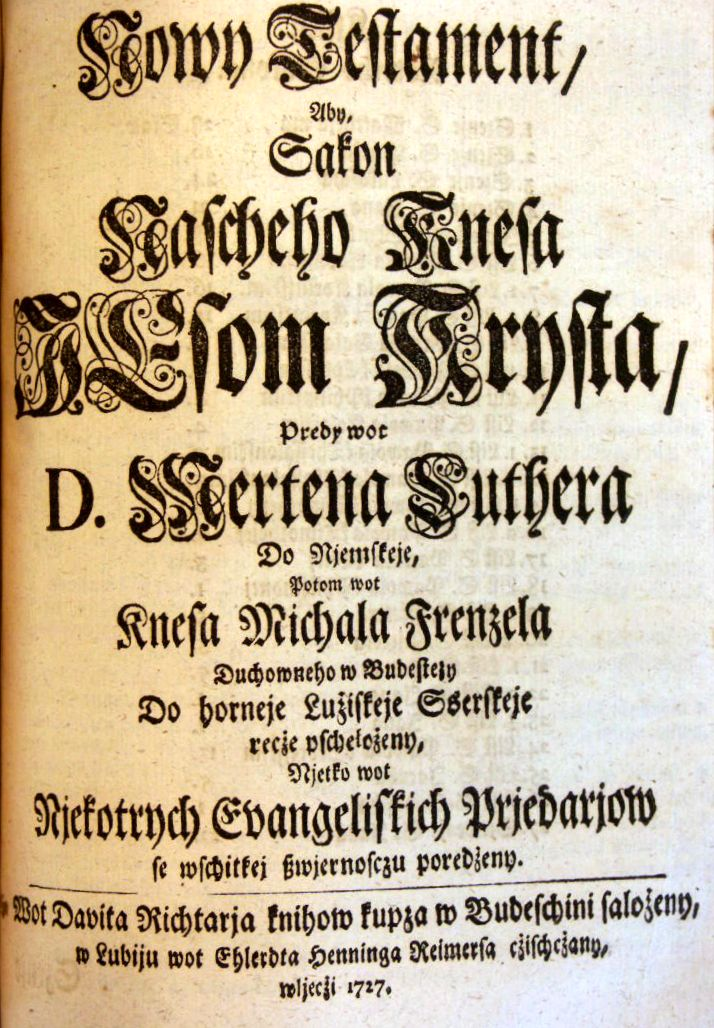
Title of the New Testament in Upper Sorbian, translated by Michael Frenzel (Bautzen 1727)

With the support of Philipp Jacob Spener, Michał Frencel sought financial assistance from Henrietta Catharina von Gersdorf to publish the New Testament. Together with Pawoł Prätorius (Paul Prätorius) and Michał Raca (Michael Rätze), Abraham Frencel published the Psalms in 1703, financed once again by Baroness von Gersdorf. Before Michał Frencel's translated New Testament was printed in 1706, following his death it was revised first by his son Abraham and then by the five-member translation committee under Prätorius's leadership.

In 1719, Jurij Matej published a partial translation of the Old Testament, namely the Book of Sirach. After eleven years of translation and revision by pastors Jan Běmar, Matej Jokuš, Jan Langa, and Jan Wawer, the complete Bible was printed in 1727–1728 in the Upper Sorbian dialect spoken around Bautzen. The Old Testament translation relied on Luther's Bible, the Greek original, and Czech, Polish, and Slovenian Bibles. The second edition appeared in 1742, while the eleventh and final complete Protestant Bible edition was published in 1905.

Since 2012, the website of the Sorbian Protestant Association (Serbske ewangelske towarstwo) has provided access to a slightly abridged electronic version of the lectionary (Serbski lekcionar. Bibliske čitanja na Božich słužbach), based on the 1997 printed edition.

=== Catholic translations ===
Jurij Hawštyn Swětlik (Georgius Augustinus Swotlik in German), a native of Wittichenau, published numerous religious works, including Swjate Sćenja, lekciony a epistle na te njedźele a swjate dny toho cyłeho lěta (1690), Serbske katolske kěrluše (1696) and Tón mały křestijanski katolski katechismus by Petrus Canisius (undated). However, his Bible translation, Swjate Biblije: To je tón stary a nowy testament božoho Swjatoho pisma, on which he worked while serving as pastor in Radibor (1688–1707), remained unpublished because too few sponsors supported the project. For more than 150 years, the frequently reprinted lectionary (1692, 1699, 1720, and 1750), together with Swětlik's other two books, served as the sole basis for Catholic worship in Upper Sorbian.

Only in the second half of the 18th century did new Bible translations begin to appear. The Gospels of Matthew and Mark translated by Jakub Buk (Jacob Buck) were printed in 1862. Ten years later, Michał Hórnik (Michael Hornig) published Jan Laras's translation of the Psalms. Hórnik himself, together with Bishop Jurij Łusčanski (Georg Wuschanski), prepared a new translation of the New Testament directly from the Greek text. It was published in parts in 1887 and as a complete volume in Bautzen in 1896. Thanks to Hórnik, it employed the standardized ("analogous") orthography.

At Hórnik's suggestion, Filip Rězak (Philipp Resak), then court preacher in Dresden, undertook a new translation of the Old Testament. He compared his translation with both the Hebrew and Latin original texts. The printed portions included the Book of Job, the Psalms, and part of the Book of Proverbs. Rězak also authored Krótke bibliske stawizny ("Short Biblical Stories") and Krótki katechismus ("Short Catechism"), published in 1887 and 1888 respectively.

Approximately 250 years after Swětlik, a group of Upper Sorbian Catholic theology students and young priests began work in 1953 on a new Bible translation. The New Testament was published by Domowina Publishing House in 1966, followed by the Psalms in 1968, the wisdom and prophetic books in 1973, and the historical books of the Old Testament in 1977. A revised complete edition of this translation was finally published by Měrćin Salowski in 2006.

== See also ==
- Jakubica, Miklawš, 1548. The Lower Sorbian Testament of Miklawuš Jakubica
- Fabricius, Gottlieb. 1709. Das Neue Testament Unsers Herrn Jesu Christi

== Bibliography ==
- Trautmann, Reinhold (1928). Der Wolfenbütteler niedersorbische Psalter. Leipzig.
- Schuster-Šewc, H. (1967). Das niedersorbische Testament des Miklawuš Jakubica 1548. Berlin.
- Lewaszkiewicz, T. (1995). Łużyckie przekłady Biblii. Przewodnik bibliograficzny. Warsaw.
- Schuster-Šewc, H. (1996). Das Neue Testament der niedersorbischen Krakauer (Berliner) Handschrift. Ein Sprachdenkmal des 17. Jahrhunderts. Bautzen.
- Udolph, Ludger (2001). "Jurij Hawštyn Swětliks Übertragungen des Neuen Testaments (1687–1711)". In Jaworski, Tomasz; Pyżewicz, Wojciech (eds.). Nowy Testament w dziejach i kulturze Europy. Zielona Góra.
- Salowski, Martin (2003). "Stawizny hornjoserbskeje katolskeje biblije". Rozhlad. 53 (11/12).
- Malink, Jan (2003). "Europske přełožki biblije - Serbja w přirunanju". Rozhlad. 53 (11/12).
- Lewaszkiewicz, Tadeusz (2017). "Die Geschichte der sorbischen Bibel / Stawizny serbskeje biblije". Fünf Jahrhunderte. Die Sorben und die Reformation / Pjeć lětstotkow. Serbja a reformacija. Bautzen.
- Hose, Susanne; Mahling, Martin; Pollack, Friedrich, eds. (2019). Reformation und Ethnizität. Sorben, Letten, Esten im 16. und 17. Jahrhundert. Bautzen.
