= Bible translations into Romansh =

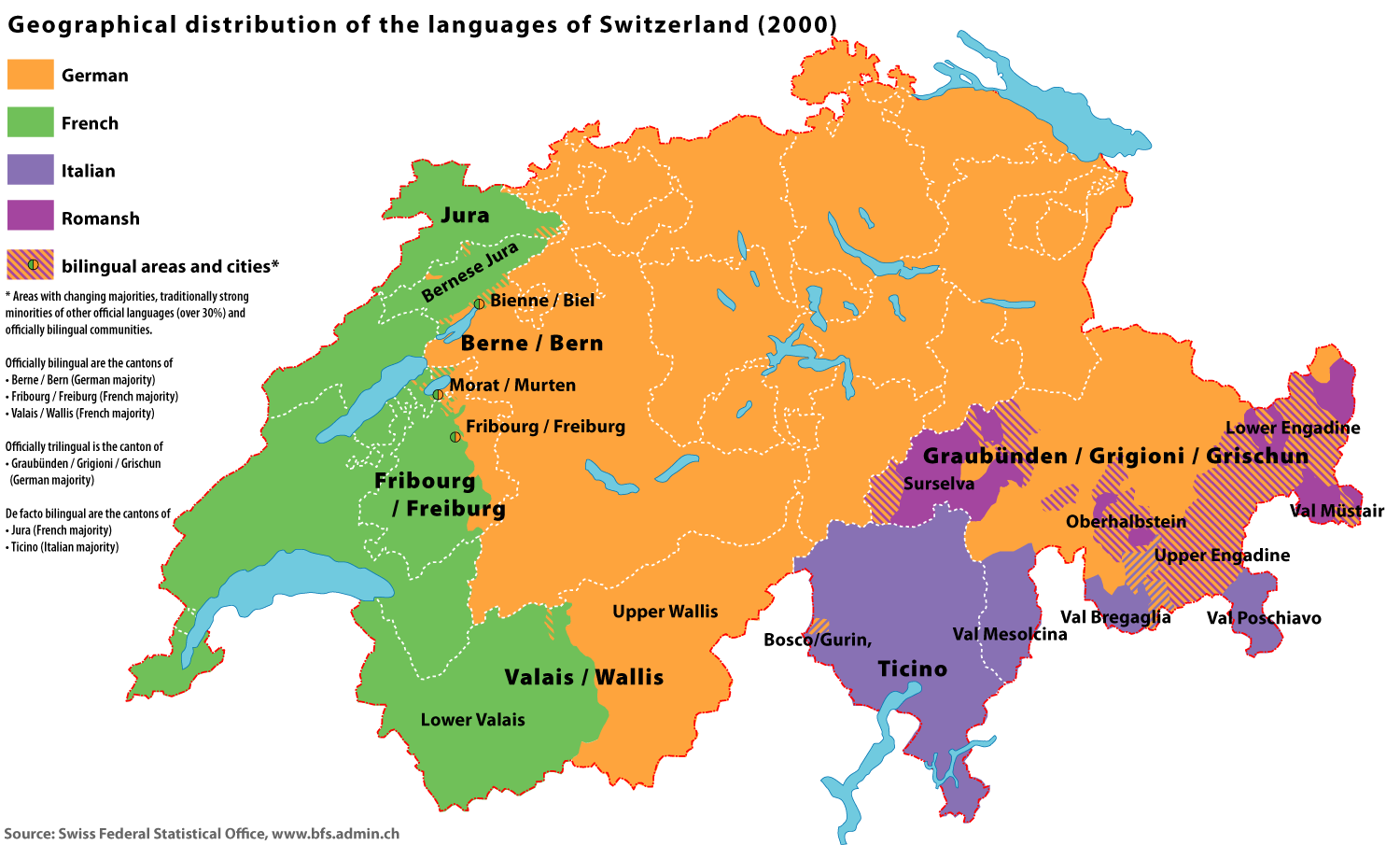
The Romansh-speaking part of Switzerland is shown in brownish purple on this map.

Bible translations into Romansh are about the translations of the Bible into Romansh, which is one of the "four approved languages" of Switzerland.

== History ==
In the 16th century, the first Romansh Bible was made. In 1560, Jachiam Tütschett Bifruns, one of the men of Romansh literature, translated the Bible into Romansh, L'g Nuof Sainc Testamaint da nos Signer Jesu Christ.

In the 17th century, Romansh literature in Sursilvan, Sutsilvan and other dialects appeared. In 1648, Luci Gabriel published the New Testament in Sursilvan dialect. One of the reasons of the emergence of Romance literature in dialects is because each district had more Protestant or Catholic believers in majority.

From 1717 to 1719, the entire Bible, Bibla da Cuera, was published.

In the latter half of the 20th century, an ecumenical effort to translate the Bible from the original Hebrew and Greek texts into modern Romansh started between the Protestant and Roman Catholic people, with a plan to publish Bibla ecumena romontscha in five volumes. The New Testament was published in 1988, the Prophets of the Old Testament in 2004, and the Psalms in 2010. As of 2014, the Psalms have just been republished together with Songs. The Pentateuch and the History Books are forthcoming.

Translation	John 3:16
Romansch Lower Engadine dialect. Unknown source.	Perche cha Deis ha tant amâ il muond, ch’el ha dat seis unigenit figl, acio cha scodün chi craja in el non giaja a perder, ma haja la vita eterna.
Romansch Upper Engadine dialect. Unknown source.	Perche Dieu ho taunt amo il muond, ch’el ho do sieu sulgenuieu Figl, acciò cha scodün, chi craja in el, nun giaja a perder, mo hegia la vita eterna.
Romansch Oberland dialect. Unknown source.	Parchei Deus ha teniu il mund aschi car, ca el ha dau siu parsulnaschiu figl, par ca scadin, ca crei en el, vomi buc á perder, mo hagi la vita perpetna.

== See also ==
- Religion in Switzerland
- Languages of Switzerland
- Canton of Grisons, the only canton where Romansh has official status
