= Charles Fraser (missionary) =

Charles Fraser was a missionary with the Scottish Missionary Society to "Russian Tatary". He was the first person to attempt translating the Bible into the Kazakh language. Matthew was printed in 1818, and the New Testament in 1820 by the Russian Bible Society, in Astrakhan.

He had no classical education.

He left Scotland for Russian Tatary in the spring of 1803.
