= Bible translations into Romani =

Romani languages are the languages spoken by the Roma people, commonly called Gypsies. The language is often called Romanes.

The first Gospel to be translated into a Romani language was the Gospel of Luke into the Caló language, spoken in Spain and Portugal. It was translated by George Borrow. This was printed by the British and Foreign Bible Society in 1837 and a revision was printed in 1872.

There are portions, and selections of the Bible in many different forms of Romani.webpage listing different Romani Scriptures

The French Romani writer and pastor Matéo Maximoff translated the Bible into Kalderash Romani. The Psalms were first printed by the French Bible Society in 1984 and the New Testament was printed in 1995.

Translation	John (Iovano) 3:16
E Lashi Viasta/Ruth Modrow (1984)	O Del drago sas e lumia, ai wo tradia peske ieke shaves, kashke kon godi kai pachalpe ande leste te na xaiil, numa te avel les o traio kai chi mai getolpe.

This is a list of key publications of the Bible and religious literature in various Baltic-Romani dialects:

- In 1933, Janis Leimanis (1886–1954), a Roma missionary, translated the Gospel of John, the Lord's Prayer, and the Ten Commandments into the Latvian Romani (Chúkhno) dialect. These translations were published in Riga.
- In 1990, religious poems reflecting biblical themes by Polish Rom Kororo Mursh (Blind Valiant) were published by Roma Publications in Chandigarh, India.
- In 1993, Dzura Makhotin, a poet and translator, published "The Story About Jesus" in the combined Northern-Russian/Vlakh Romani dialect through Dzhudes Publishing in Tver, Russia.
- In 1996, V. Kalinin and T. Voytsekhovskaya published a translation of the Book of Matthew in Balt-Slavonic Romani in Vitebsk, Belarus.
- In 1999, GBV Dillenburg, Germany, published the Gospel of Matthew in Lithuanian Romani and the Gospel of John in Balt-Slavonic Romani, both translated from the Greek originals.
- In 2000, the Latvian Bible Society (L.B.B.), Riga, published the Book of Luke in Latvian Romani. This was translated by V. Kalinin and Karlis Rudevichs, using a draft by Janis Neilands (1919–1999), who had translated it into his native Latvian Romani Kurzemiaki dialect in 1994.
- In 2001, the New Testament, along with Psalms and Proverbs, was translated into the Balt-Slavonic Romani dialect of Belarus and Lithuania by V. Kalinin and published by GBV Dillenburg, Germany.
- In 2014, DCL, Biel, and MiDi Bible, Préverenges, Switzerland, published the complete Bible, glossary and a history of Roma in Balt-Slavonic (Belarus-Lithuanian) Romani, translated by V. Kalinin.
- In 2019, the complete Bible in Baltic Romani, rendered in Cyrillic and Roman script, was added to the Digital Bible Library.
