= Bible translations into the languages of China =

The Bible has been translated into many of the languages of China besides Chinese. These include major minority languages with their own literary history, including Korean, Mongolian, Tibetan, Kazakh, Kyrgyz, Russian and Uyghur. The other languages of China are mainly tribal languages, mainly spoken in Yunnan in Southwest China.

== Jingpho/Kachin ==
The Bible was first translated into the Kachin language in Burma in 1927, by a Swedish Baptist missionary, Ola Hanson. Amity Press published the Jingpho Bible in 1989 and again in 2013.

Translation	John 3:16
Myanmar Bible Society 2006	Kaning rai nme law, Karai Kasang a Kasha hpe kam sham ai ni nlang hte gaw, hten bya n hkrum ai sha, htani htana asak lu la mu ga nga, Karai Kasang gaw shi a Kasha shingtai hpe jaw kau ai kaw du hkra, mungkan ga hpe tsaw ra wu ai.

== Lahu ==
The complete Bible was first published in Lahu in 1989.

Translation	John 3:16
Thailand Bible Society	Awˬ lawn kʼo, Gʼuiˬsha miˬguiˬ yaˇ hta‸ ha‸ jaˇ ve pa taw, yawˇ ve Yaˇ hpu tiˍ piˇ laˇ ve yoˬ. Hkʼe te leh, Yaˇ hpu hta‸ hkʼa yonˍ ve chaw hkʼa peu-eˬ maˇ gʼa luˬ maˇ gʼa sheˆ ve awˬ hkʼoˆ ka‸, co ti‸ ha ti‸ hta‸ gʼa ve yoˬ.

== Lisu ==
Lisu is part of the Tibeto-Burman family. Samuel Pollard and James O. Fraser prepared simple Christian literature while they were in the first stages of learning the Miao and Lisu languages. Upon the creation of the Fraser (Old Lisu) script in 1915, Fraser started work on translating the Bible.

In the Central Lisu dialect, Fraser first worked on Mark and John, publishing them in the 1920s. He then handed on the translation task to Allyn Cooke and his wife, Leila, coming back to help the team with revision in the mid 1930s. Isobel Miller Kuhn also worked on the translation. The New Testament was finished in 1938, and the complete Bible in 1968.

The Trinitarian Bible Society completed a translation in 1980, with some light revisions having been made in the later part of that decade. An annotated Bible in Lisu was completed in 2013 from the United Bible Societies.

Translation	John 3:16
Lisu Bible (SI XY ꓕO L⅂), Trinitarian Bible Society (1980)	ꓮꓽ ꓟ ꓥˍ ꓟꓲ ꓬꓲ ꓔꓯ ꓙꓵꓻˍ ꓠꓬ ꓟꓽ ꓟꓶꓽ ꓡꓰ ꓢꓲ꓾ ꓕꓲ ꓞꓲꓼ ꓕꓲ ꓑ ꓟ ꓢꓯꓼ ꓟꓬ ꓟꓶ ꓠꓹ ꓟ꓾ ꓪꓴ-ꓢ ꓠꓬ ꓬꓲ -ꓤ- ꓔꓲꓸ ꓖꓶ ꓗꓷ ꓗꓪ ꓛꓲ꓾ ꓟꓲ ꓠꓯ ꓞꓳ ꓤ ꓔꓯ ꓠꓲꓹ ꓠꓵˍ ꓡꓳ꓿

== Eastern Lisu/Lipo ==
Bible translation in Eastern Lisu started in the early 1900s, using an early version of the Pollard script to write the language. The Gospel of Matthew, translated by George E. Metcalf and Arthur G. Nicholls was published by the British and Foreign Bible Society as early as 1912. The New Testament in Eastern Lisu, translated by George E. Metcalf, was first published in 1951 in Hong Kong; however, no copies ever got back to Yunnan. A complete Bible in Eastern Lisu was finished in 2013, published by the United Bible Societies.

== Miao ==
Sam Pollard began work translating the New Testament into the Large Flowery Miao language of northeastern Yunnan in 1906, publishing parts of it, however died of typhoid in 1917 before he could finish it. Colleagues completed the work. The book was typeset in Japan, and eventually 85,000 copies were distributed.

In the late 1980s, Miao Christian leaders decided to finish Pollard's work and translate the Old Testament. After discussion with the Yunnan Christian Council and the Three-Self Patriotic Movement, semi-official organizations, a translation team was formed in Kunming. One question was whether to continue to use the Pollard script, which was familiar to Christians from their reading of older materials, or to use the new script promulgated by the government in 1956. In the end, a modified version of the old script was used. When Pollard's Miao characters were not yet included in Unicode, standard computer word processing programs could not handle the text. Consultants from among the missionaries created keyboard shortcuts, but their unique characters could not be copied or the text checked. The Pollard script has since been added to Unicode released in version 6.1. The new translation was launched at a ceremony in Kunming in September 2009, with an initial printing of 10,000 copies.

== Naxi ==
The Gospel of Mark was translated into Naxi, spoken in Yunnan, by Elise Schapten using the Pollard script and published by the British and Foreign Bible Society in 1932.

== Wa ==
The New Testament in Wa was translated by Vincent Young and published in 1938 by the British and Foreign Bible Society. The entire Bible was completed by Wa Christians in the nineties, and a trial version was published. Since the trial version, the Bible Society of Myanmar has been worked on a thorough revision of the text, and a finalized Wa Bible was published in April 2012. Amity Press has published the New Testament in Wa, available on YouVersion.

== Xishuangbanna Dai ==
The Bible was first translated into Xishuangbanna Dai in 1933.

== Yi ==
Amity Press has published the New Testament in Yi.

== See also ==
- Bible translations into Chinese
- Bible translations into Manchu
- Bible translations into Korean
- Bible translations into Mongolian
- Bible translations into Tibetan
- Bible translations into Uyghur
