= Bible translations into Lao =

Work on translation of the Bible (Lao: ພຣະຄັມພີ) into the Lao language was begun by Swiss Brethren missionaries in 1902, producing three Gospels in 1908, then a translation of the full Bible in 1932. The US Bible Society has recently published a modern translation of the Bible into Lao.

== Current situation ==
In 2012, a revised version of the Bible in Lao was published with the assistance of a former Buddhist who had converted to Christianity whilst in the United States. The new translation needed because the old one lacked some verses, and used an older dialect of Lao that was not commonly understood contemporarily. She was then asked in 2015 by the Lao Evangelical Church to help translate the Good News Study Bible into Lao. In 2019, the Jehovah's Witnesses released a Lao translation of the New Testament at a conference in Thailand.

Since the Communist takeover of Laos, Bible distribution is heavily restricted by the Lao People's Revolutionary Party government. Under Decree 315 issued in 2016, Laos allows Christianity to be practiced, but it is very heavily regulated by the Communist authorities: they are the sole arbiter of what is permissible. Lao Bibles may only be printed legally by the state printing presses with government approval through recognised churches, and there is a cap on how many can be printed annually. Only the Roman Catholic Church, the Seventh-Day Adventist Church and the Lao Evangelical Church are recognised by the government, but they are still restricted on importing Lao language Bibles.
