= Bible translations into Latvian =

The Lutheran pastor Johann Ernst Glück translated the Bible into the Latvian language, which was published in 1694 in Riga.

This translation was republished many times, repeatedly re-edited. Most recently a revision was begun in 1931 and printed in 1965 by the United Bible Societies, London. For this the main language editor was Professor Ernests Blese. This translation used the traditional "ch" and "ŗ" of pre-war Latvia and Latvians in exile.

In 1995 The Latvian Bible Society (LBB) began work on a new Bible translation; Gospels and Acts 1999, the whole New Testament 2007. The Publishing House "Zinātne" ("Science") has issued a number of Old Testament books in some editions, but the LBB's Old Testament translation is still being prepared for publication. In 2005 the Latvian Bible Society issued the Deuterocanonical books.
