= Bible translations into Breton =

Bible translations into the Breton language

Jean-François Le Gonidec translated the Bible into Breton language. After the Catholic Church refused its publication it was eventually published in 1827 under the auspices of the British and Foreign Bible Society, who had been lobbied to support Le Gonidec by the champion of Welsh language publications, Thomas Price (known as "Carnhuanawc"). The resulting "Protestant" translation was placed on the Index of Banned Books by the Catholic Church.

The Old Testament of Le Gonideg was edited after his death by Editions Prud'hommes (Saint-Brieuc), printer of the Diocese of Saint-Brieuc, in 1866.

A contemporary translation of the Old Testament is Testamant Kozh, 5 volumes, translated from Hebrew into Breton by Pierre Le Gall and Job Lec'hvien. Editions An Tour-Tan (1980–1986).

In June 2025, the diocese of Vannes (Brittany) published a new website containing the entire Bible translated into Breton language, the result of the work of around ten priests over several decades.

== New Testament ==
There are several translations of the New Testament in the Breton language.

- Testamant Nevez, 2 volumes, translated into Breton under the supervision of Maodez Glanndour, a Catholic priest. Editions Al Liamm, Lannion (1969–1971).
- Another modern translation of the New Testament is that of the « Kenvreuriez ar brezoneg » Eskopti Kemper ha Leon (Confraternity of the Breton language, Diocese of Quimper and Leon, a group of Breton-speaking priests from this diocese) under the supervision of Mgr Visant Favé, former auxiliary bishop of the diocese of Quimper and Leon, and a Breton writer:
  - Aviel Jezuz-Krist (the four gospels): this translation for liturgical and pastoral purposes was edited by Editions « Ar Skol dre Lizer » in 1982.
  - An Testamant Nevez (eil lodenn): The New Testament (second part), translated and edited by the «Kenvreuriez ar brezoneg» in 1988, also with a liturgical and pastoral aim.
- The Father Pierre Guichou, a catholic biblist, has published his own translation in 2002, edited by the catholic spiritual centre Minihi Levenez: An Testamant Nevez. Kelou Mad Jezuz, or Zalver (« The New Testament. Good News from Jesus our Saviour ») translated from Greek into Breton.
