= Bible translations into Estonian =

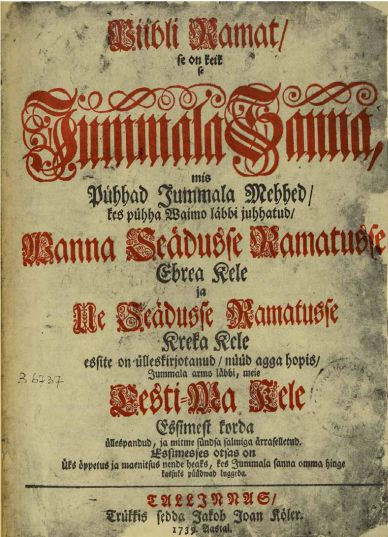
Bible (1739)

The first northern Estonian language version of the New Testament was published in 1715, with the whole Bible of Anton thor Helle appearing in Estonian in 1739.
