= Bible translations into Oceanic languages =

Bible translations into Oceanic languages have a relatively closely related and recent history.

== Futunan ==
Futunan is the language of Futuna Island. The first portions of the Bible on Aniwa Island was Mark and Matthew, translated by John Gibson Paton. These were published in Melbourne in 1877. In 1880 Acts was printed at Melbourne under the care of Mr. Paton's sons. In 1882–3 John, 1st and 2nd Timothy, Titus, Philemon, 1st, 2nd, 3rd John and Jude were printed at Melbourne. Paton's translation of the complete New Testament was published in 1899.

== Gilbertese ==
Hiram Bingham II, Congregationalist, translated at least parts of the Bible into Gilbertese.

Translation	John (Ioane) 3:16
Bingham, 1866	Ba e bati taṅiran te aomata iroun te Atua, ma ṅaia are e aṅa Natina ae te rikitemana, ba e aoṅan aki mate ane onimakina, ma e na maiu n aki toki.

== Māori ==
The Bible was translated into the Māori language in the 19th century by missionaries sponsored by the Church Missionary Society. In 1826, the Rev. William Williams started work on the translation of the Bible into the Māori language. The Rev. Robert Maunsell worked with William Williams on the translation of the Bible. William Williams concentrated on the New Testament; Maunsell worked on the Old Testament, portions of which were published in 1827, 1833 and 1840 with the full translation completed in 1857.

In July 1827 William Colenso printed the first Māori Bible comprising three chapters of Genesis, the 20th chapter of Exodus, the first chapter of the Gospel of St John, 30 verses of the fifth chapter of the Gospel of St Matthew, the Lord's Prayer and some hymns. It was the first book printed in New Zealand and his 1837 Māori New Testament was the first indigenous language translation of the Bible published in the southern hemisphere.

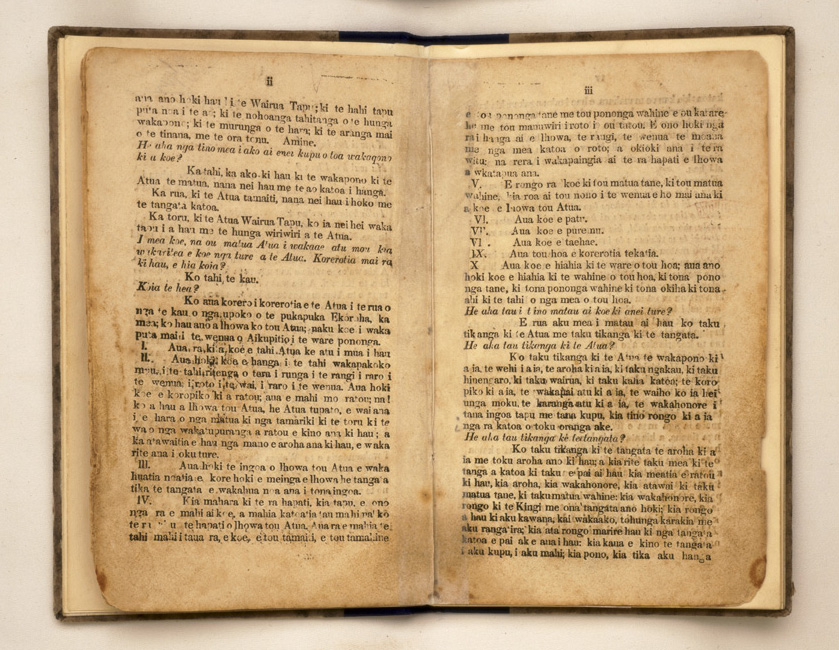
Page ii and iii of Ko te Katekihama III, printed by William Yate, 1830

In 1830, during Rev. William Yate's stay in Sydney, New South-Wales, he supervised the printing of an edition of 550 copies of a translation of the first three chapters of the Book of Genesis; the first eight chapters of the Gospel according to St. Matthew; the first four chapters of the Gospel according to St. John; the first six chapters of the Epistle of St. Paul to the Corinthians; parts of the Liturgy and the third catechism, Ko te katekihama III.

William Gilbert Puckey also collaborated with William Williams on the translation of the New Testament, which was published in 1837 and its revision in 1844.

The translation and printing of the Book of Common Prayer was completed by November 1841. The greater number of the Collects were translated by the Rev. William Williams; the Sacramental and Matrimonial Services by William Puckey; and the remaining Collects, with the Epistles from the Old Testament, Thanksgivings, and Prayers, Communion of the Sick, Visitation of the Sick, Commination, Rubrics, and Articles of Religion, by William Colenso. From May to September 1844 a committee consisted of Archdeacon William Williams, the Rev. Robert Maunsell, James Hamlin, and William Puckey revising the translation of the Common-Prayer Book. The first complete editions of the New Testament, and the revisions, were published at the expense of the British and Foreign Bible Society.

The Rev. William Williams and Rev. T. W. Meller M.A., the Editorial Superintendent of the British and Foreign Bible Society, worked to revise the translation of the New Testament. In 1853, 15,000 copies were printed in England. These copies, when circulated, made the total number of 106,221 copies of the New Testament printed in the Māori language and distributed by the CMS and Wesleyan Missionary Society in New Zealand. In the early 1860s Elizabeth Fairburn Colenso helped prepare the revised Māori Old Testament and New Testament for the press. She corrected the printed copy, sometimes suggesting alternative translations.

The first edition of the full Māori Bible was published in 1868. Since then, there have been four revisions of the full Bible at intervals of 21 years, 36 years and finally 27 years up to the 1952 edition. The New Zealand Bible Society has a vision for a new translation of the Bible into modern colloquial Māori.

Translation	John 3:16
	Koia ano te aroha o te Atua ki te ao, homai ana e ia tana Tama kotahi, kia kahore ai e ngaro te tangata e whakapono ana ki an ia, engari kia whiwhi ai ki te ora tonu.

== Rarotongan ==
Rev. John Williams with the support of Rev. Aaron Buzzacott and Rev. Charles Pittman translated the New Testament in the late 1820s through to the early 1830s. He left Rarotonga, Cook Islands in 1834 for England to conduct a series of fundraising lectures, publish his book Missionary Enterprises in the South Seas and to publish the Rarotongan Bible - New Testament. He came back to Rarotonga soon after, and left for the New Hebrides in 1839 where he was killed and eaten by cannibals at Erromanga on 20 November 1839. He was 43 years of age. The complete Bible was published in 1851. [Insert by Tangata Vainerere, 2014]

Translation	Ioane 3:16
	I aroa mai te Atua i to te ao nei, kua tae rava ki te oronga anga mai i tana Tamaiti anau tai, kia kore e mate te akarongo iaia, kia rauka ra te ora mutu kore.

== Samoan ==
Samoan language first had a Gospel of John from 1841, then a Bible from 1844, mainly the work of George Pratt.

== Tahitian ==
John Davies (1772–1855) and Henry Nott (1774–1844) translated the Bible into Tahitian.

== Tongan ==
Although parts of the Bible were first translated into Tongan in 1844, the New Testament was first published in 1849. The first complete edition of the Bible was translated into Tongan by Wesleyan missionaries; the translation was then revised and edited by Thomas West, and published in London by W. M. Watts in 1860 (New Testament) and 1862 (Old Testament). Another translation of the Bible into Tongan was completed by James Egan Moulton in 1902 after serving there as a Methodist minister for eleven years. His translation is still in use today.
