= Bible translations into Basque =

The earliest translation of the old testament into the Basque language (a fragment). By Pierre D'Urte of St. Jean de Luz, circ. 1700

Joanes Leizarraga, a Catholic priest who joined the Reformation, translated the New Testament into Basque (1571).

George Borrow translated the Gospel of Luke into Basque in 1838, but the translation were banned for personal sale, with only public libraries being permitted copies.

Jose Antonio Uriarte produced the first complete Bible translation in Gipuzkoan Basque in the mid-19th century, but this was never published. His close colleague, Jean-Pierre Duvoisin, made the first translation which was published (in Lapurdian Basque) in 1859, under the auspices of the philologist Louis Lucien Bonaparte.

The new Elizen Arteko Biblia was published in 1983 (New Testament) and completed 1994.
