= Bible translations into Khmer =

Translation of the bible into the Cambodian language

The first translation of the Bible into the Khmer language, was by the American missionary Arthur L. Hammond, who began translating the Bible in 1925. The New Testament was completed in 1934 and the entire Bible in 1954. It was revised in 1962. The UBS affiliate Bible Society in Cambodia was established in 1968.

Christianity in Cambodia was ruthlessly suppressed during the Khmer Rouge rule of Cambodia (1975–1979), then began to resurface under the People's Republic of Kampuchea government during the 1980s. New modern language versions followed in the 1990s but were initially not well received. Currently, the Bible Society in Cambodia supplies the Khmer Standard Version (2005) and the "Khmer Old Version" (Hammond Version 1954, 1962).

In 2008 the Watchtower Bible and Tract Society produced the New World Translation of the Christian Greek Scriptures in Khmer.

In 2012, Asia For Jesus produced the Khmer Christian Bible New Testament (KCB). It is currently working on completing the Old Testament. This Bible also includes some brief study notes to help new readers.

In 2018, the Cambodian Bible Society held the celebration for the printing of the Revised version of the original Khmer Old version (RKOV) (Hammond Version 1954,1962). This and all translations are available on youversion.

Also in 2018, the Global Bible Initiative produced the Global Khmer Bible (GKhB). It is also currently translating the Old Testament. Several teachers have found this Bible to be very clear and accurate to the original translations.
