= Institute for Bible Translation =

The Institute for Bible Translation (IBT) was founded in Stockholm, Sweden in 1973 by the Bosnian-Croatian poet Borislav Arapović, its main task being to publish Bibles for "non-Slavic peoples in Slavic countries," not just Bible translations into the languages of Russia but also Central Asian languages.

Eighty-five million people in non-Slavic ethnic groups living in the former Soviet Union—now CIS, including Russia—represent a tremendous diversity of languages (at least 130 different languages) and religions (Islam, Buddhism and shamanism). The Institute for Bible Translation is also a part of the Forum of Bible Agencies International.

== History of IBT ==
=== 1970s: Reprints of 19th-century translations ===
Initially IBT also republished 19thC BFBS versions which had fallen out of print, such as the Psalms in Yakut (1897, reprinted IBT 1975).

=== 1980s: new translations programme ===
The IBT office in Helsinki was opened in 1983. It coordinates the translation projects in 12 Finno-Ugric languages spoken in Russia. In 1988 IBT supplied 150,000 copies of the Lopukhin Bible free of charge to the Orthodox Patriarchate. At the time this, and an earlier shipment of 100,000 copies, almost doubled the number of Bibles in circulation in the USSR.

=== 1990s: registration in Moscow ===
Since 1995 IBT Russia/CIS (Russian: Институт перевода Библии) has been registered in Moscow. The staff members are from various Christian denominations. The current director is Dr. Vitaly Voinov. IBT's Moscow office coordinates the work of 65 translation teams, whose members may live in different areas or even in different countries. It arranges training courses for them and organizes seminars and conferences. The Bible texts are prepared there for printing. The Institute also produces Scripture books for children, Bible reference works and language-related research material. IBT in Russia/CIS cooperates with churches and religious organizations of all Christian denominations, national Bible Societies, scientific (academic) institutions and the state authorities.

== Translation programmes ==
IBT is a member of the Forum of Bible Agencies International. In some translation projects, the institute works in partnership with other international Bible agencies, such as the United Bible Societies, the SIL/Wycliffe Bible Translators and Pioneer Bible Translators.

The aim of IBT is to produce accurate and faithful translations that reveal the Bible's message to modern readers. So far IBT has translated and published the Bible, or portions of it, in more than 80 languages, including 5 (Tajik, Georgian, Tuvin, Chechen and Udmurt) complete Bibles and 31 New Testaments. IBT's Children's Bible has been published in 38 languages.

=== Languages ===
Languages in which IBT works include:

- Ibero-Caucasian: Abaza, Abkhaz, Avar, Adygei, Agul, Andi, Bezhta, Chechen, Dargin, Georgian, Kabardian, Lak, Lezgi, Rutul, Tabassaran, Tsakhur, Tsez
- Iranian language group: Baluchi, Digor, Kurdish (Kurmanji), Ossetian, Rushani, Shughni, Tajik, Tat, Wakhi, Yasgulyam,
- Isolates: Ket, Nivkh, Yukagir,
- Mongolian: Buryat, Kalmyk,
- Manchu-Tungus: Nanai, Even, Evenki
- Paleo-Asiatic: Chukchi, Itelmen, Koryak
- Samoyedic: Enets, Nenets, Nganassan, Selkup
- Sino-Tibetan: Dungan
- Turkic: Altai, Azeri, Balkar, Bashkir, Crimean Tatar, Chuvash, Dolgan, Gagauzi, Karachai, Kazakh, Khakas, Kumyk, Kyrgyz, Nogai, Shor, Tatar, Turkmen, Tuvin, Uzbek, Yakut
