= Bügsiin River =

River in Khövsgöl Province, Mongolia

- Native name: Бүгсийн гол (Mongolian)

Location
- Country: Mongolia
- Aimag: Khövsgöl

Physical characteristics
- Source
  - location: Bürentogtokh sum
  - coordinates: 49°17′N 99°26′E
- Mouth: Delger mörön
  - location: Tömörbulag sum
  - coordinates: 49°16′30″N 100°41′0″E

Basin features
- Progression: Delger mörön→ Selenga→ Lake Baikal→ Angara→ Yenisey→ Kara Sea

Bügsiin River (Mongolian: Бүгсийн Гол) is a river in the Khövsgöl aimag in Mongolia. It starts in the Bürentogtokh sum near the eastern end of Sangiin Dalai Lake, passes by the Tömörbulag sum center Jargalant and ends in the Tömörbulag sum at the Delger mörön River, very close to its confluence with the Ider River into the Selenge.

== See also ==
- List of rivers of Mongolia
