= Bible translations into Mongolian =

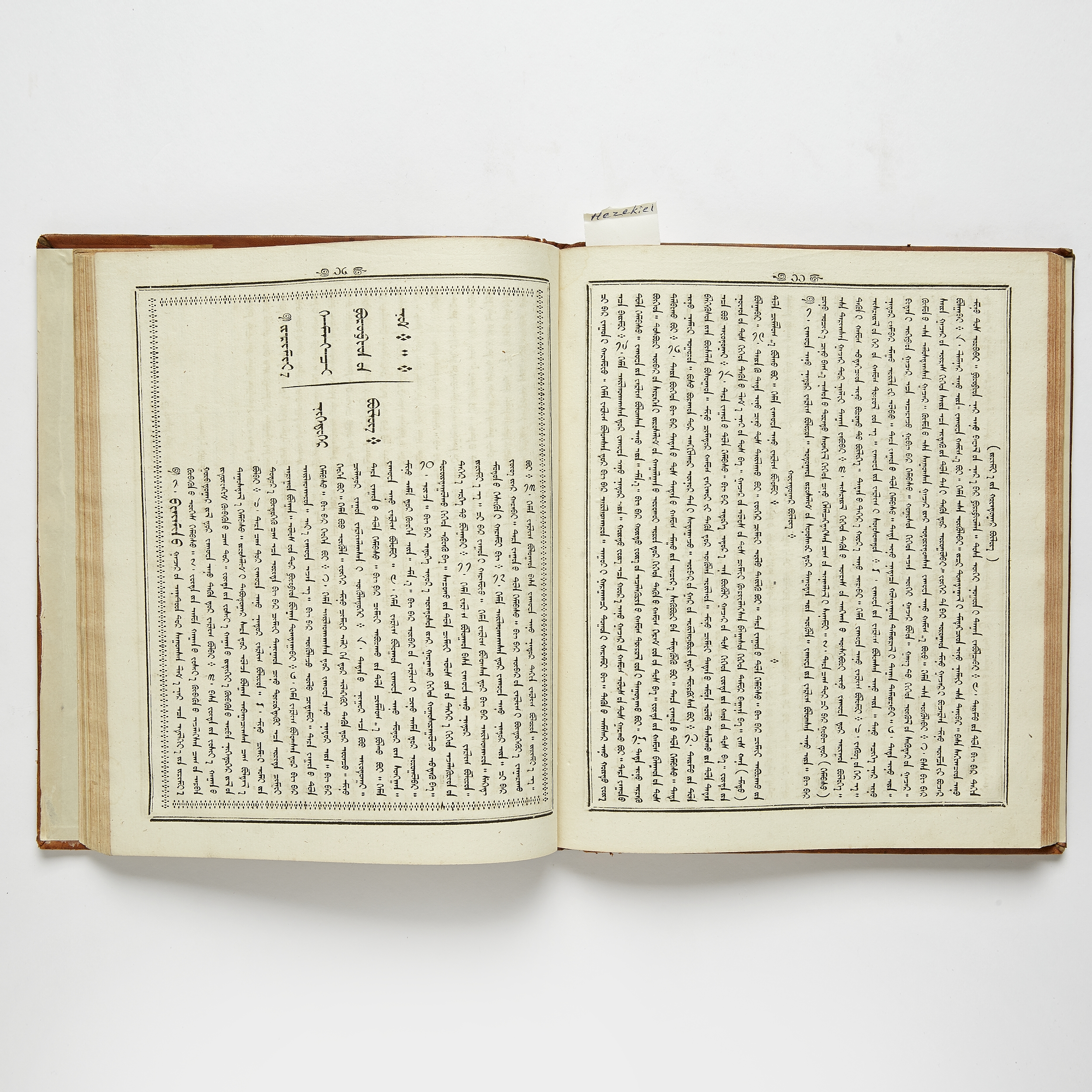
1840 printing of the Book of Jeremiah in Mongolian script

The earliest preserved translation of the Bible into the Mongolian language dates to 1827, but there is a written record of what may perhaps have been a translation existing as early as 1305. Since 1827, numerous other translations have been made.

== Early translations ==
In a letter dated from 8 January 1305, Giovanni da Montecorvino wrote that "I have got a competent knowledge of the language and character which is most generally used by the Tartars. And I have already translated into that language and character the New Testament and the Psalter, and have caused them to be written out in the fairest penmanship they have." His work however, seems to be lost, as has any other translations Nestorian missionaries or Christian Mongolian tribes may have translated. One difficulty with this is that there is scholarly uncertainty whether this translation was into Mongolian or into another language Mongols used in order to relate with other peoples. Another difficulty with this claim is lack of any other evidence that it existed.

Moravian translations into Kalmyk Mongolian

In line with the missionary movement of the Moravians in Germany, missionaries were first sent to Mongolian speakers in 1785. The first Bible translations that still exists today of the Bible into Mongolian was the work of the Moravians. Isaak Jakob Schmidt, as a Moravian missionary, is renowned still today as a scholar of Mongolian and Tibetan. He had been a merchant amongst the Mongolians and had a very thorough knowledge of the culture and language. SCHMIDT, I. J. 1827. New Testament in Kalmyk. [s.l.]: [s.n.]. This translation appearing in 1827 was based on all the years of work and study since 1785. Since the translators were accustomed to Martin Luther's translation of the Bible into German, they then produced an idiomatic translation. This version did not use terms from Buddhism or shamanism to refer to God. Schmidt's dictionary defines the term Burhan as Buddha (Schmidt, 1835: 116). Mongolians have been using this term for Buddha from at least the time of Marco Polo, who mentions it, to today. Moravian missionaries found it: very mournful and discouraging when the Kalmyk Prince Dschalzen read the Gospel of Matthew in Kalmyk seeing Jesus as their own Buddhist concept saying: This Jesus seems to me to be a Burchan, [Burhan] such as we have likewise in our religion […] In reality, we have but one Burchan (1818: 302). Missionaries said Kalmyks continually quoted: their Burchans, believing Buddhism showed how a person could become Burhan after death (1797: 197). Sodnom, one of their converts said: Burchans [Buddhist reincarnations] themselves had not known the true God (1823: 177).

=== Swan and Stallybrass ===
The second translation that still exists today of the Bible into Mongolian was the work of Edward Stallybrass and William Swan (missionary) (1791–1866) both of the London Missionary Society (LMS), who translated the Old and then the New Testament into the literary Mongolian language. STALLYBRASS, E., W. SWAN, R. YUILLE and I. J. SCHMIDT. 1840. Old Testament in Mongolian. Khodon, Siberia, STALLYBRASS, E. and W. SWAN. 1846. The New Testament of our Lord and Saviour Jesus Christ : translated out of the original Greek into the Mongolian language. London: British and Foreign Bible Society. Joseph Edkins and Joseph Schereschewsky, together with a Mongolian lama (Buddhist monk), revised Swan and Stallybrass's translation of Matthew into colloquial Khalkha Mongolian. It was published in 1894. The missionaries who worked on this translation said that they used Buddhist monks to help them in the work. The whole uses Buddhist terms for God, and God is called Burhan, the term Mongolians use for Buddha.

In 1899 the British and Foreign Bible Society agreed to bring out a revised gospel, by David Stenberg (of the Scandinavian Mission) and Mr. Netsegaard (of Urga, today called Ulaanbaatar), based on Swan and Stallybrass, which he found too classical in style to be understood by the common person. It seems that Stenberg managed to revise into colloquial Urga Mongolian at least Matthew's gospel. He was working on revising all four gospels and Acts, however his work was cut short when he was killed during the Boxer Rebellion. It is unclear if any of his work survived this.

The New Testament of Swan and Stallybrass was revised by Stuart Gunzel together with four Mongolians and 8,000 copies were printed in 1953 by the Hong Kong Bible Society (HKBS). This was reprinted in 1988 by the Hong Kong Bible Society. In 1994 Living Stream Ministry reprinted this, using the Cyrillic script instead of the classical Mongolian, but changing nothing else. All of these works retain the Buddhist word Burhan for God.

In 2009 the ABPPM foundation published a revision of the Bible as "The Classical Mongolian Bible". The old Testament is based on the 1840 British and Foreign Bible Society text, and the New Testament is based on Swanson's 1950 text. The biggest revision that was done was the substitution of the words "Yehovah Tenger" for the term Burhan.

== Translations in Inner Mongolia ==
=== Ibegeltü nom ===
Missionswerk Unerreichte Völker e.V. (M.U.V.) spent 14 years translating the New Testament into a classic literary Inner Mongolian; this was published in the classical Mongolian script as "Ibegeltü nom" in 2003 and also released on the Internet. They have also translated Psalms and Genesis, however lack of funds halted further progress. The products of MUV have consistently identified God using the Buddhist term Burhan.

In Inner Mongolia there are at least three modern Bible translations.

=== Mongolian New Translation ===
The complete Bible in the 'Mongolian New Translation' was translated and published as "Ariun Nom" in 2012. This version was printed in the classic Mongolian script, using the term Burhan for God, like majority of previous translations into Mongolian. The translation is a balance between word-for-word and dynamic equivalence.

=== Inner Mongolia 'Deed Tenger' translation ===
Another is a dynamic equivalence translation, using the word Deed Tenger, instead of the term Burhan, for God. They published the New Testament as Shine Geree in July 2007.

=== Amity Press translation ===
A third translation, sponsored by the three self Church and Amity press is being translated by Bao Xiaolin. A trial version of the four gospels was published in 2011, and a trial version of the New Testament was released on 23 September 2013. This version is being translated from Chinese, and creates a lot of non originally Mongolian expressions and vocabulary from Chinese.

== Translations in Mongolia ==
=== (Bible Society of Mongolia) ===
The scriptures produced by Bible Society of Mongolia have an important difference from other versions, in that they avoid using Mongolian key terms for God which derive from Buddhism or shamanism. The term for God Burhan was rejected because of associations with Buddhism and Tenger because of associations with shamanism. Instead they use a translation of the phrase “Lord of the universe”, yertöntsiin ezen (lord of the universe).

==== 1979 Part New Testament in Mongolian ====
This was based on the Bible text in Greek and was done mainly in Ulaanbaatar. Work on this version started in 1971. It was the first three Gospels, Acts and some epistles. It was the first part of the Bible to be translated into Mongolian in modern times. It was published in 1979.

==== 1989 book of Job (Iovyn tüüh) ====
In 1987 the Mongolian Union of Writers requested a translation of the Book of Job. The translation was published by the Union of Writers in their journal in 1989.

==== 1990 New Testament (Shine Geree) ====
The translation work carried on the work began in 1971. The New Testament in Mongolian was published on 11 August 1990 by the United Bible Societies in Hong Kong.

At that time Mongolia had no churches, the first church coming into existence only later that year. There were no books about the Bible or any form of reader helps or commentaries, and no Mongolian Old Testament available. Thus the aim was to produce a "self-interpreting" translation of the New Testament, resulting in a translation with translator-inserted explanations.

==== The Bible of 2015 ====
This is a tight meaning based translation based on the Hebrew, Aramaic and Greek Biblical texts. It is the work of a Mongolian/expatriate team working with those texts. In 2001 Wycliffe Bible Translators and United Bible Societies drew up a formal agreement with Bible Society of Mongolia to carry out a full Bible Translation Consultant check of the whole. After it had been translated into Mongolian, the Bible was back translated into English so enabling consultants of Wycliffe Bible Translators and United Bible Societies to thoroughly check it against the Biblical texts and approved it for publication.

=== Mongolia Union Bible Society (MUBS) ===
The Mongolia Union Bible Society aims to work with the Christian congregations in Mongolia, regardless of denomination. In April 2016, MUBS became a member of United Bible Societies (UBS) which represent 147 Bible Societies around the world. UBS is in the historic tradition of the British and Foreign Bible Society (BFBS), which had published the nineteenth century work of Swan and Stallybrass. The products of MUBS have consistently identified God using the widely used and understood term Burhan.

==== Ariun Bibli ====
Dissatisfaction with the explanatory aspects and the "phrase terms" of the 1990 translation caused a new translation to begin that attempted to translate the Bible more literally and to use as many natural Mongolian terms as possible.

The Mongolian Bible Translation Committee (Монгол Библи Орчуулгын Хороо) began translating the Bible in 1991. The New Testament was completed in 1996, and the complete Bible in 2000.

The Translation Committee became the Mongolian Union Bible Society (Ариун Бичээс Нийгэмлэг) and revised the Bible translations in 2000, 2008, 2011, 2013 and 2019. The 2004 and 2013 text is available on YouVersion. This has become a popular translation in Mongolia, being used by most churches there.

This translation uses traditional Mongolian terminology, and its style is more literal than other translations. For some people it is too literal — and some people complain that it is in "translated Mongolian", without native Mongolian expressions, and sometimes hard to understand.

==== Mongolian Standard Version ====
The Mongolian Union Bible Society (MUBS) has started working on a new translation from the original Greek and Hebrew called The Mongolian Standard Version. They have so far released a preliminary version of the old testament books. This translation is scheduled to be completed in 2026.

The translation team is being led by Dr. Bayarjargal Garamtseren. It is the first translation translated by Mongolians alone directly from the original languages.

=== FirstBible International ===
FirstBible International and Trinitarian Bible Society are working on a new translation of the bible. Their translation uses the Textus Receptus as the source text. The gospel of John was published in 2012. The New Testament was published in the summer of 2017

This version uses the term Burhan, which is now the most widely used term for God amongst Mongolian Christians. Main translators include Bill Paterson and Oyumaa.

=== Mongolian Bible Translators Group ===
This started work in the late 1970s, and in 1993 published Matthew, Mark and Luke, 1998 the New Testament and whole Bible in 2016, which is from the Biblical languages. The products of Mongolian Bible Translators Group have consistently identified God using the term Burhan.

=== Mongolian Mission Team ===
Since March 2009 the team has been working full-time on translating the English language historical King James Bible (first published in 1611) into the Mongolian language. As of March 2013 the New Testament has been completed. As soon as a final read through is completed the New Testament will be printed. 2018 whole Bible translated and printed. Now the Mongolian King James Version is available in RHNTBChurch /Баянзүрх Шинэ Гэрээ Баптист чуулган/. This version calls God 'Shüteen' (object of worship).

=== Catholic Bible ===
After Mongolia gave up Bolshevism in 1991, the Catholic mission managed, after great difficulty, to create the first complete Mongolian Catholic Bible, written in the traditional Mongolian script, and printed in mid-2004. This book, having the blessing of the local Catholic bishop [1] of that time, Wenceslao, includes common Catholic prayers.

== Comparison of Translations ==
Translation	John 3:16
Swan/Stallybrass 1880; Cyrillic transcription	Тэр юуны тул хэмээвээс, Бурхан нь ертөнцийг энэ мэтээр янаглавай хэмээвээс, онц төрөгдсөн хөвгүүнээ өгвэй. Тэр юуны тул хэмээвээс, аль хэн Түүн дор итгэх бөгөөс үл эвдрэн, мөнх аминыг олохын тул болой.
Bible Society of Mongolia, 1990	Ертөнцийн Эзэн хүн төрөлхтөнд үнэхээр хайртай учраас ганц хүүгээ илгээсэн юм. Учир нь, мөнхийн зовлонд орох ёстой хүмүүс хүү Есүст нь итгэвэл мөнхийн амьдралд орж чадна.
Bible Society of Mongolia, 1999	Ертөнцийн Эзэн Хишгээд үнэхээр хайртай учраас ганц хүүгээ илгээсэн юм. Учир нь Мөнхийн Зовлонд орох ёстой Хишгээ хүү Есүст нь итгэвэл Мөнхийн Амьдралд орж чадна."
Bible Society of Mongolia, 2015	Ягаад гэвэл, Ертөнцийн Эзэн хүн төрөлхтнийг тийм их хайрласандаа л цорын ганц хүүгээ өгсөн билээ. Тийнхүү түүнд итгэсэн хүн мөнхийн зовлонд орохгий бөгөөд харийн мөнхийн амьдралтай болно.
Gunzel Cyrillic, 1994	Бурхан дэлхийг ийнхүү хайрлаж ганц Хүүгээ өгсөн нь Түүнд итгэх хүн бүр үл мөхөн, мөнх амьтай болохын тулд болой.
Ibegeltü nom, MUV, 2003; Cyrillic transcription	Бурхан орчлон дэлхийн хүмүүсийг тэр мэт хайрламой, тэгэх түүниӣгээ ганц үрээ хүртэл өршөөн. Хэмээх бүхий түүнийг сүсэглэн шүтэгчийг эс сөнөөх бөгөөд харин тэд нарт мөнхийн амь насыг хүртээмой.
ABBPM, 2009; Cyrillic transcription	Ивах тэнгэр нь гагц хөвгүүнээ өгтөл ертөнцийг хайрлавай.Энэ нь хэн түүнд итгэх бөгөөс өл сөнөн, харин мөнх амьд болохын дул болой.
Ариун Библи, 2004 (АБ2004)	Бурхан ертөнцийг үнэхээр хайрласан тул цорын ганц Хүүгээ өгсөн. Ингэснээр Хүүд итгэгч хэн ч мөхөхгүй, харин мөнх амьтай болох юм.
Ариун Библи, 2011 (АБ2011)	Бурхан ертөнцийг үнэхээр хайрласандаа цорын ганц Хүүгээ өгсөн тул Хүүд итгэдэг бүхэн мөхөхгүй харин мөнх амьтай болох юм.
Ариун Библи, 2013 (АБ2013)	Бурхан ертөнцийг үнэхээр хайрласандаа цорын ганц Хүүгээ өгсөн тул Хүүд итгэдэг бүхэн мөхөхгүй харин мөнх амьтай байх болно.
Ариун Библи, 2019 (АБ2019)	Бурхан ертөнцийг үнэхээр хайрласан учраас цорын ганц Хүүгээ өгсөн. Тиймээс Хүүд итгэдэг хэн ч мөхөхгүй харин мөнх амьтай болно.
Mongolian New Translation (MNT), 2012; Cyrillic transcription	Бурхан ертөнцийг хайрлаад цорын гагц хүүгээ өгсөн, ийнхүү түүнийг итгэгч бүхэн мөхөхгүй, харин мөнх амьтай байх болно.
Shine Geree 2007; Cyrillic transcription	Дээд Тэнгэр ертөнцийг үнэхээр хайрлаж, цорын ганц Хүүгээ өгсөн. Энэ нь түүнд итгэх хүмүүн болгоныг сөнөхгүй, мөнхийн амьтай болгохийн төлөөх юм.
Mongolian Bible Translators Group 2016	Бурхан энэ дэлхийн хүмүүсийг их хайрлаж байсан учир өөрийн ганц хүүгээ тэдэнд өгсөн. Тэгээд тэр хүүд итгэгч хүн бүхэн үхэхгүй, мөнх амийг хүртэх болно.
Mongolian Mission Team, 2018	Учир нь Шүтээн дэлхийг ийн хайрласан. Ингэхдээ цорын ганц төрсөн Хүүгээ өгсөн юм. Энэ нь түүнд итгэдэг хэн боловч мөхөхгүй харин мөнхийн амьдралтай болохын тулд билээ.

Translation	"Ibegeltü nom" 2003	Swan/Stallybrass 1880	"MNT" 2013	ABPPM, 2009	Shine Geree 2007
John; 3:16					ᠳᠡᠭᠡᠳᠦ ᠲᠩᠷᠢ ᠶᠢᠷᠲᠢᠨᠴᠦ ᠶᠢ ᠦᠨᠡᠬᠡᠷ ᠬᠠᠶᠢᠷᠠᠯᠠᠵᠤ ᠂ ᠴᠣᠷ ᠤᠨ ᠭᠠᠭᠴᠠ ᠬᠦᠦ ᠪᠡᠨ ᠥᠭᠭᠦᠭᠰᠡᠨ ᠃ ᠡᠨᠡ ᠨᠢ ᠲᠠᠬᠦᠨ ᠳᠤ ᠢᠲᠡᠭᠡᠬᠦ ᠬᠦᠮᠦᠨ ᠪᠤᠯᠭᠠᠨ ᠢ ᠰᠥᠨᠥᠬᠢᠬᠦ ᠦᠭᠡᠢ ᠂ ᠮᠥᠩᠬᠡ ᠶ᠋ᠢᠨ ᠠᠮᠢ ᠲᠡᠢ ᠪᠤᠯᠭᠠᠠᠠᠣ ᠶ᠋ᠢᠨ ᠲᠦᠯᠥᠬᠢ ᠶᠤᠮ᠃

== See also ==
- Bible translations into Kalmyk
- Bible translations into Buryat
- Step by Steppe by Hugh Kemp
