= Beltes River =

River in Khövsgöl, Mongolia

- Native name: Бэлтэсийн Гол (Mongolian)

Location
- Country: Mongolia
- Aimag: Khövsgöl

Physical characteristics
- Source
  - location: Khoridol Saridag mountains, Renchinlkhümbe sum
  - coordinates: 50°37′N 99°40′E
- Mouth: Delger mörön
  - location: Bayanzürkh sum
  - coordinates: 50°08′56″N 98°52′49″E

Basin features
- Progression: Delger mörön→ Selenga→ Lake Baikal→ Angara→ Yenisey→ Kara Sea

Beltes River (Mongolian: Бэлтэсийн Гол) is a river in the Khövsgöl aimag of Mongolia.

It starts in the Renchinlkhümbe sum in the south-western range of the Khoridol Saridag mountains, about 40 km north-west of Khatgal. It ends by entering the Delger mörön in Bayanzürkh sum, shortly after passing the sum center Altraga.

== See also ==
- List of rivers of Mongolia
