= Novoselenginsk =

Rural locality in Buryatia, Russia

Coordinates: 51°06′11″N 106°41′12″E

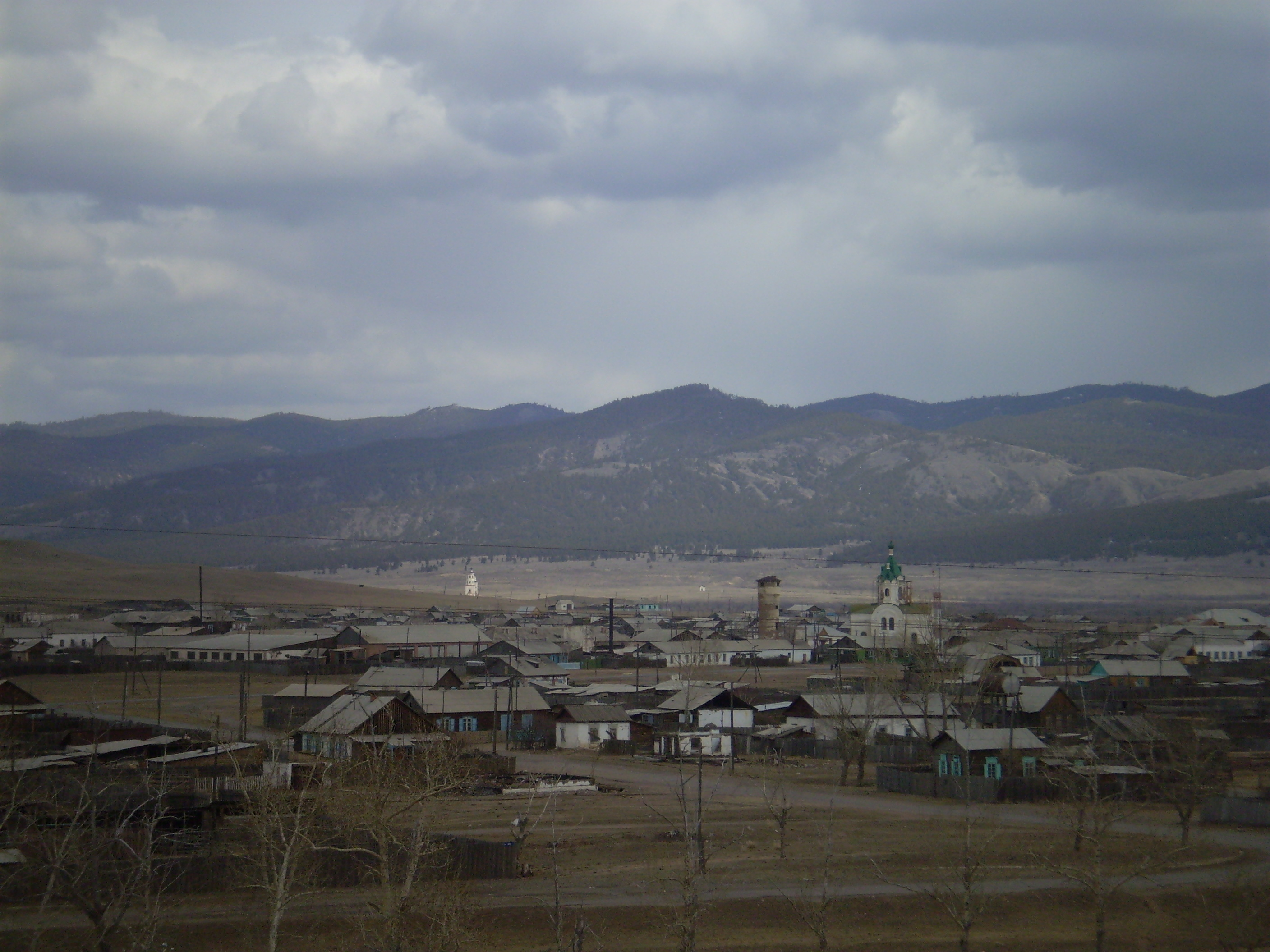
Novoselenginsk in 2010

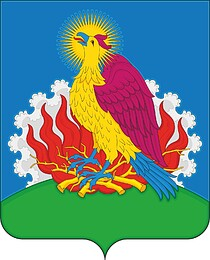
Coat of arms of Novoselenginsk

Novoselenginsk (Russian: Новоселенги́нск) is a rural locality (a settlement) in Selenginsky District of the Republic of Buryatia, Russia, located on the Selenge River south of Lake Baikal. The urban-type settlement of Selenginsk, located 115 kilometers (71 mi) to the north, is unrelated to this settlement. The Decembrist Nikolay Bestuzhev was exiled here from 1839 until his death in 1855.

== History ==
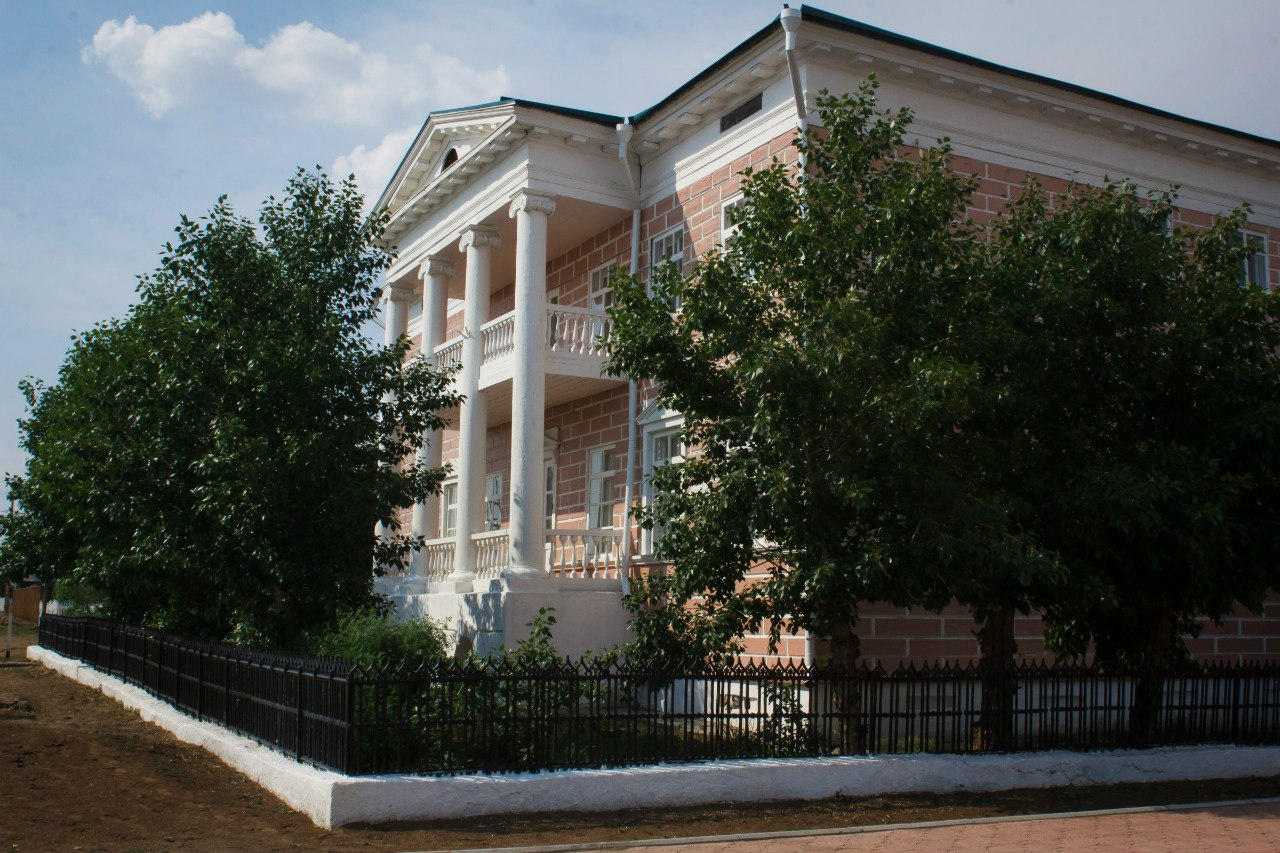
Museum of the Decembrists named after N. Bestuzhev

Prior to the arrival of the Russians, the inhabitants of the region were the Buryats, a Mongol people who still make up a sizeable part of the population. The first fortified settlement of the Russians on the Selenge River, Selenginsky ostrog was located north of the confluence of the Chikoy and Selenge Rivers on the Selenge's right bank. The ostrog was founded by Gavril Lovtsov in 1655, and was located about 20 kilometers (12 mi) southeast of Lake Gusinoye and 85 kilometers (53 mi) southeast of Lake Baikal. The Selenge River soon became part of the main Russo-Chinese trade route, which, by boat, led through Siberia to Lake Baikal, up the Selenge, and then by caravan southeast to Peking. Consequently, the ostrog soon grew and became a major administrative center of the Transbaikal region.

In 1677-1680, a secondary fort was built downriver at what later became Ulan-Ude. In 1688, the ostrog was besieged by the Khalkha Mongols for two months, but they had to withdraw when their main territory was attacked by the Oirats. The Khalkas, who at this time were vassals of the Manchus, attacked because the Russians had taken control of their kinsmen and vassals, the Buryats and because the Russians were giving asylum to fugitives. The defence was led by Demian Mnohohrishny, an exiled Cossack who had previously played an important part in Ukrainian history. He died and was buried here in 1703. Also present was Fyodor Golovin. The Treaty of Nerchinsk (1689) would have been negotiated here, but Golovin was forced to move east to Nerchinsk so that the Manchu ambassadors could avoid the fighting in Mongolia.)

In 1719, traveler John Bell said Selenginsk was a town of "two hundred houses and two churches...It is defended by a fortification of strong palisades on which are mounted some cannon."

In 1727-1730, Abram Petrovich Gannibal, Alexander Pushkin's African great-grandfather, was exiled here after Peter the Great's death. He was involved in shifting the fortress to a new location. In 1729, Selenginsk was a center for the negotiation of the Treaty of Kyakhta. This led to the foundation of Kyakhta on the Russo-Chinese border upstream which later became a more important town.

By 1745, it was the largest town east of Lake Baikal with 4,000 inhabitants. State caravans ran through here until 1755. Two large fires in 1783 left only fifteen houses and parts of the fort standing. Many merchants moved northheast to Ulan-Ude where a fair had been established in 1780.

In 1819, Selenginsk became home to Edward Stallybrass and William Swan of the London Missionary Society, who with the blessing of Alexander I of Russia sought to bring the Christian gospel to the Buryat people. The mission, which relocated to Khodon in 1828, was eventually suppressed in 1840 by the Holy Synod of the Russian Orthodox Church under Alexander I's successor, Nicholas I.

Alexander Michie passed through Selenginsk in 1863. He described it as a "small, rather pretty town" with "commodious barracks, one fine church, and some good houses." He noticed that many workmen were "mixed blood" Russians and Buryats.
