= Arbulag, Khövsgöl =

District in Khövsgöl Province, Mongolia

Coordinates: 49°54′43″N 99°26′48″E

Arbulag District Арбулаг сум ᠠᠷᠤᠪᠤᠯᠠᠭᠰᠤᠮᠤ
- District
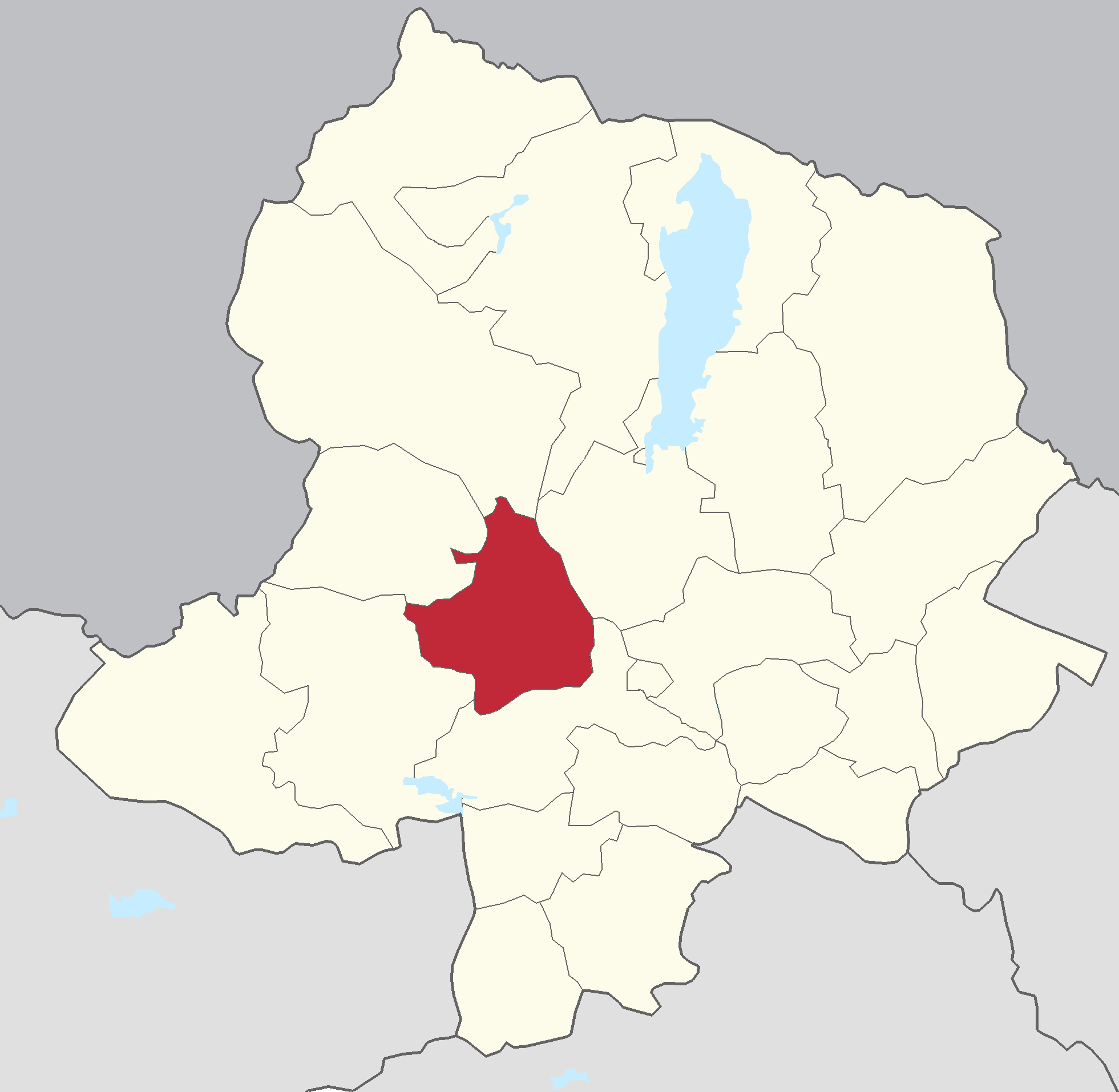
- Arbulag District in Khövsgöl Province
- Country: Mongolia
- Province: Khövsgöl Province
- Time zone: UTC+8 (UTC + 8)

Arbulag (Mongolian: Арбулаг, lit. "northern rill") is a sum of Khövsgöl aimag. The area is about 3,360 km^{2}, of which 3,120 km^{2} are pasture. In 2000, the sum had 4478 inhabitants, mainly Khotgoid and Darkhad. The center, officially named Mandal (Mongolian: Мандал) is located 75 km northwest of Mörön and 742 kilometers from Ulaanbaatar.

== History ==
The Arbulag sum was founded, together with the whole Khövsgöl aimag, in 1931. In 1933, it had about 3,200 inhabitants in 911 households, and about 106,000 heads of livestock. In 1959, areas from Arbulag and Alag-Erdene sum were joined the new Sümber sum, but this sum soon was joined to Arbulag again. The local negdel was founded in 1939, under the name Sörtiin negdel. Later the name was changed to Mandal.

== Administrative divisions ==
The district is divided into six bags, which are:

- Bel Bulag
- Bor Gol
- Khavtaga
- Sumber
- Targan nuur
- Urt bulag

== Economy ==
In 2004, there were roughly 135,000 heads of livestock, among them 58,000 sheep, 58,000 goats, 9,700 cattle and yaks, 9,300 horses, and 200 camels. There are some phosphorite and bauxite reserves in the area.

== Interesting Places ==
In 1953/56, remains of a palace and a stele from the time of Mönkh Khaan were discovered near the border to Bürentogtokh. About 10 km east of the sum center is a large Ovoo known as Tsagaan chuluutyn ovoo that, according to local folklore, might be the grave of Chingünjav.

== Literature ==
M.Nyamaa, Khövsgöl aimgiin lavlakh toli, Ulaanbaatar 2001, p. 18f
