= Stallybrass =

Stallybrass is an English surname. Notable people with the surname include:

- Anne Stallybrass (1938–2021), English actress
- Edward Stallybrass (1794–1884), British Congregational missionary
- William Stallybrass (1883–1948), British barrister
