= Ider River =

River in Mongolia

Ider River Ider gol
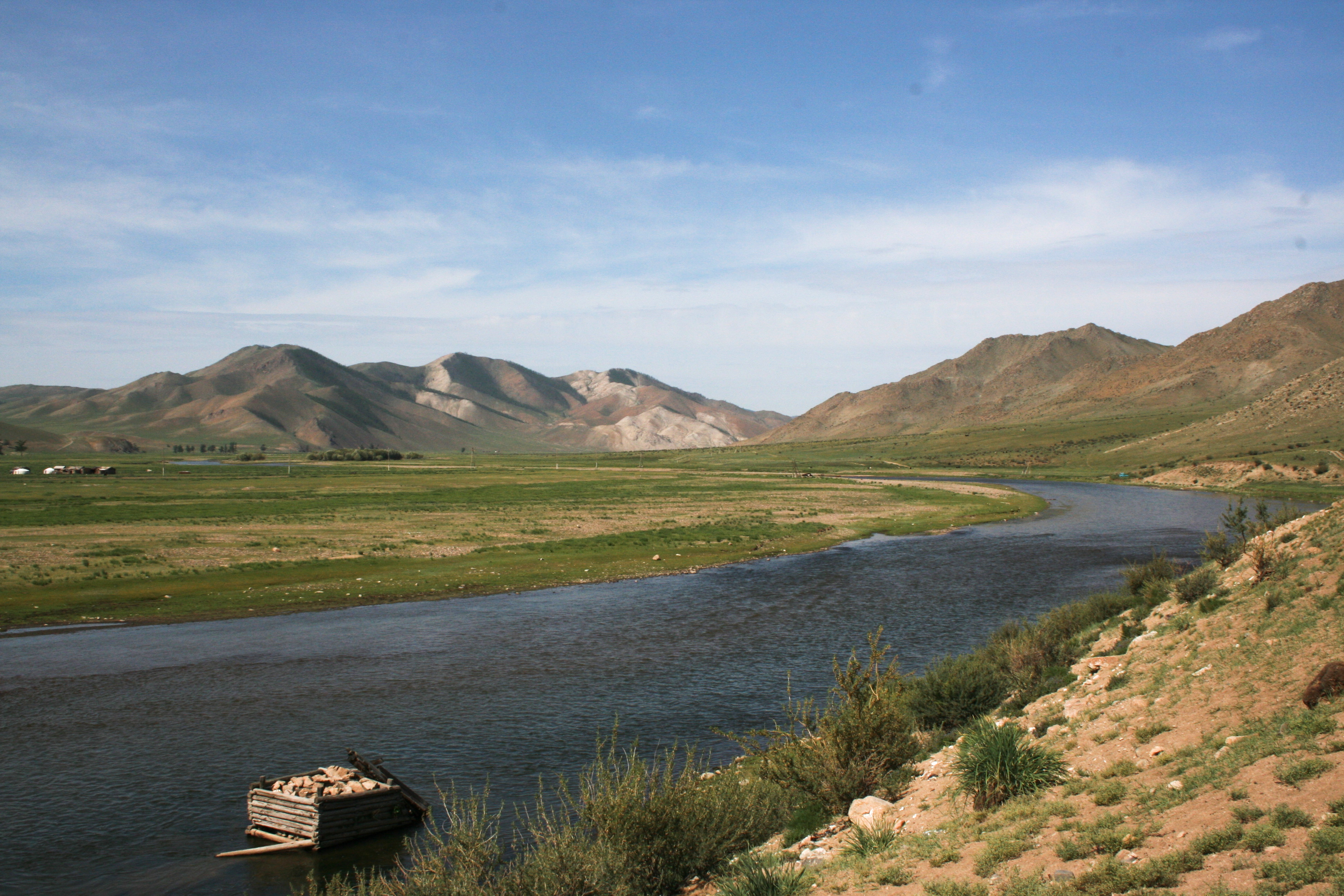
- Ider River near Jargalant, Khövsgöl
- Etymology: Mongolian: Ider, "young, youthful")
- Native name: Идэр гол (Mongolian)

Location
- Country: Mongolia
- Aimags: Zavkhan, Khövsgöl

Physical characteristics
- Source
  - location: Khangai Mountains
  - coordinates: 47°54′47″N 97°57′1″E (approximately)
  - elevation: 2850 m (approximately)
- Mouth: Selenge
  - location: Olon golyn bilchir
  - coordinates: 49°15′40″N 100°40′45″E
- Length: 452 km (281 mi)
- Basin size: 24,555 km^{2} (9,481 sq mi)
- Discharge
  - average: 57 m^{3}/s (2,000 cu ft/s)

Basin features
- Progression: Selenga→ Lake Baikal→ Angara→ Yenisey→ Kara Sea
- Tributaries
  - right: Chuluut River

The Ider River (Mongolian: Идэр гол, Ider gol, or Идэрийн гол, Ideriyn gol, "Young River") is a river in the Khövsgöl and Zavkhan aimags in northwestern Mongolia and is, together with the Delger mörön river, one of the sources of the Selenga river. It is 452 kilometres (281 mi) long, and has a drainage basin of 24,600 square kilometres (9,500 sq mi). The source is in the Khangai range, the confluence with the Delgermörön is in Tömörbulag. The river is frozen 170–180 nights per year. There is a wooden bridge, which was built in 1940, near Jargalant and a concrete bridge in Galt.

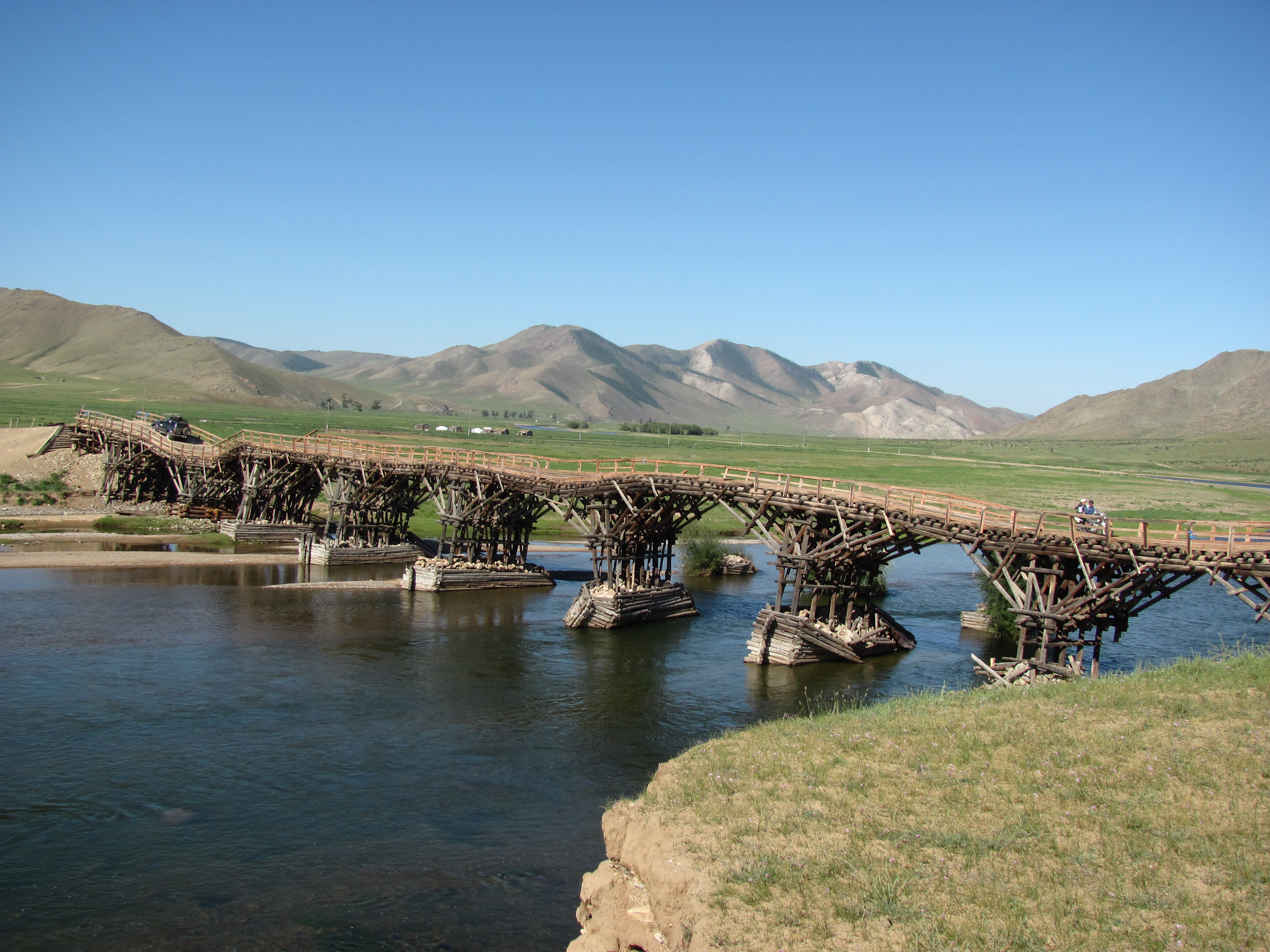
Wooden bridge near Jargalant.

== Usage ==
In 2014, around 0.5 million m^{3} of water was withdrawn from the river for domestic, livestock, cropland and industrial use.

== See also ==
- List of rivers of Mongolia
