= Chingünjav =

Khalkha prince (1710–1757)

- ᠴᠢᠩᢉᠦᠨᠵᠠᠪ
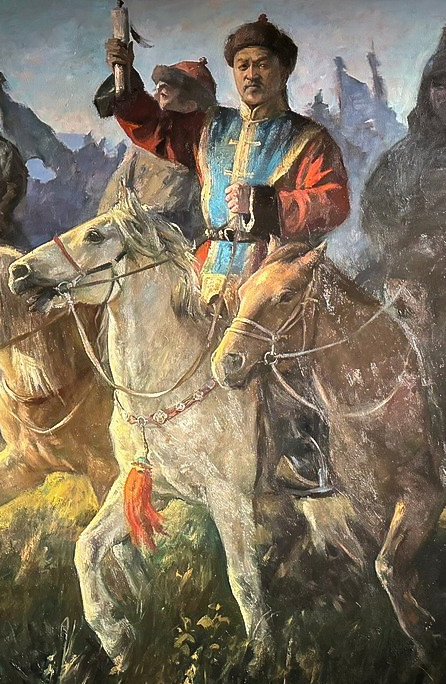
- Modern depiction of Chingünjav at the Chinggis Khaan National Museum
- Born: 1710; Erdeni Degüregchi Wang, Zasagt Khan, Outer Mongolia
- Died: 11 March 1757 (aged 47); Peking, Qing China
- Cause of death: Execution
- Occupations: Noble, general
- Title: Shadar Wang of Khotgoid

Chingünjav (Mongolian: Чингүнжав, Classical Mongolian: ᠴᠢᠩᢉᠦᠨᠵᠠᠪ, Chinese: 青袞雜卜), also known as Commander Chingünjav (Mongolian: Жанжин Чингүнжав, 1710–1757), was the Khalkha prince ruler (Shadar Wang) of the Khotogoids and one of the two major leaders of the 1756-57 rebellion in Outer Mongolia. Although his rebellion failed, he is nowadays often hailed as a fighter for Outer Mongolia's independence from the Manchu-led Qing dynasty of China.

== Early life and career ==
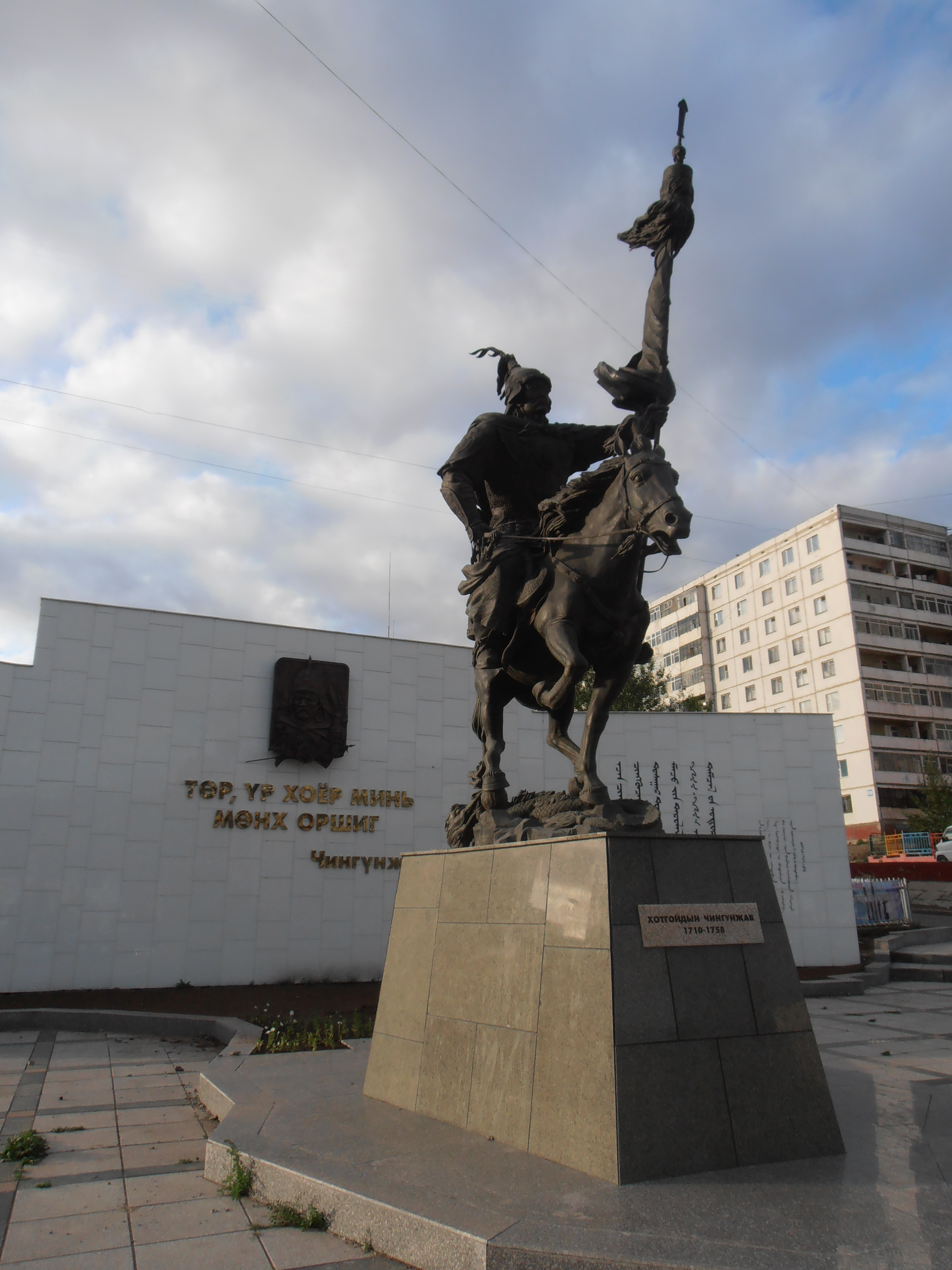
Monument to Chingünjav in Ulaanbaatar

Chingünjav was born in 1710 at the shore of Sangiin Dalai Lake, in the Khotogoid's Erdeni Degüregchi Wang khoshuu (banner) of Zasagt Khan aimag, or today's Bürentogtokh sum of Khövsgöl aimag.

Chingünjav's grandfather, Büübei, voluntarily accepted Manchu citizenship and conquered the territory of the modern Russian Republic of Tuva for the Qing Empire. For his faithful service to the Manchus, he received the rank of а "Gun", and then а "Beile". Chingünjav's father, Bandi, was the khoshuu's Zasag Noyon between 1730 and 1737. In 1737, Chingünjav succeeded his father. Chingünjav made a career in the Manchu military and eventually reached the rank of an assistant general of Zasagt Khan aimag.

== Conspiracy with Amursana ==
During the 1755 Manchu campaign against the Dzungar Khanate, Chingünjav and Amursana conspired to start a rebellion in the autumn of the same year; however, their seniors discovered their plans and separated them. Chingünjav was sent to fight in Uriankhai, and Amursana was summoned to Beijing after disputing the Qing settlement of the Dzungar territories; on the way to Beijing, Amursana escaped from his escort. The escape led to the trial and execution of the commander of Amursana's escort, an event that alarmed the Khalkha nobility.

== Rebellion ==
In the summer of 1756, Chingünjav left his post, gathered troops in his home area, and sent a petitionary letter to the Qianlong Emperor announcing his grievances and intentions. Unrest spread throughout Khalkha, where Mongolian rebels attacked the Qing garrisons and robbed Chinese merchants, causing desertion of army posts and disruption of relay services. However, support from other nobles and even from the 2nd Jebtsundamba Khutughtu did not materialize, and Chingünjav never commanded more than about 1,000–2,000 men.

By the time Manchu forces, reinforced by loyal Outer Mongolian banners and detachments from Inner Mongolia, moved against him, Chingünjav had been unable to draw a large coalition and did not confront the Qing in a pitched battle.

He retreated north toward the Darkhad area, losing men to desertion; when he was captured at a place now called Wang Tolgoi (about 10 kilometres from Khankh) in January 1757, only some fifty of his followers reportedly remained with him.

== Aftermath ==
Chingünjav, together with almost his whole family, was brought to Beijing and executed on 11 March 1757. However, Chingünjav's five-year-old son was pardoned because of the faithful service of Chingünjav's grandfather and father to the Manchu. The Manchus, although not as brutal as they had been towards the Dzungars, sent punitive units to Mongolia to deal on the spot with all those rebels they could find; nobles who were suspected of having sympathized with Chingünjav were also executed. The second Jebtsundamba Khutugtu Luvsandambiydonmi "died" in January 1757 at the age of 34, and the Tüsheet Khan shortly afterwards in 1759. The Qianlong Emperor was involved in the recognition of the third Jebtsundamba Khutugtu, Ishdambiynyam, found in Tibet, thus he was able to demonstrate his authority to the gathered Mongol nobles.

== Legacy ==
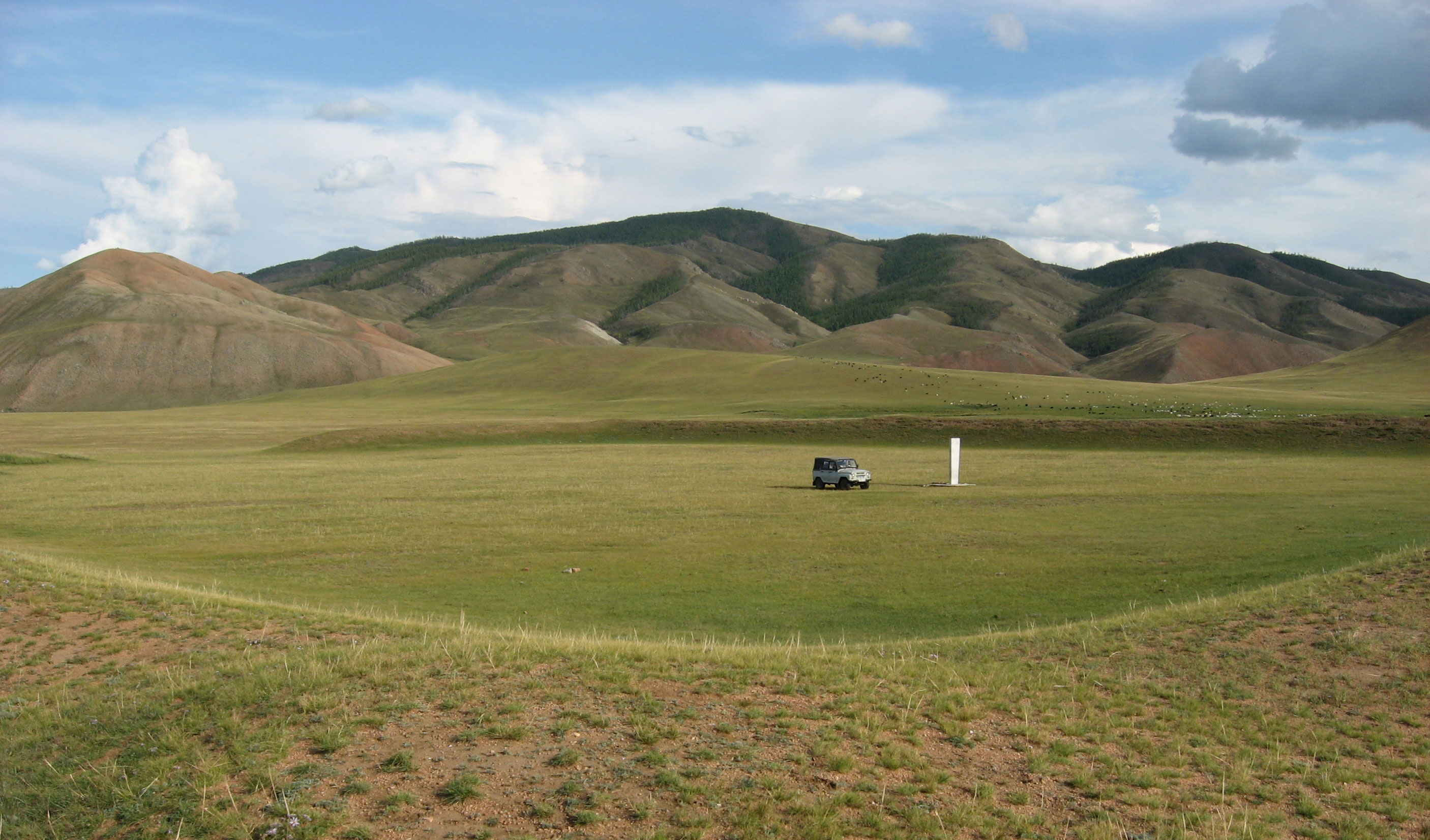
Remains of a fort attributed to Chingünjav, at the Zagzuu creek, some kilometers south of Bürentogtokh

Although never having had a realistic chance to succeed, Chingünjav passed into the realm of folklore. A statue of him was erected in Mörön. In 2012, Mongolian Bronze Foundry created a monument in his honor in Ulaanbaatar, inscribed, "May my state and children live eternal" (Mongolian: Төр, үр хоёр минь мөнх оршиг).

== Literature ==
- Charles R. Bawden, The Modern History of the Mongols, London 1968, p. 114 - 134
