= Delger mörön =

River in Mongolia

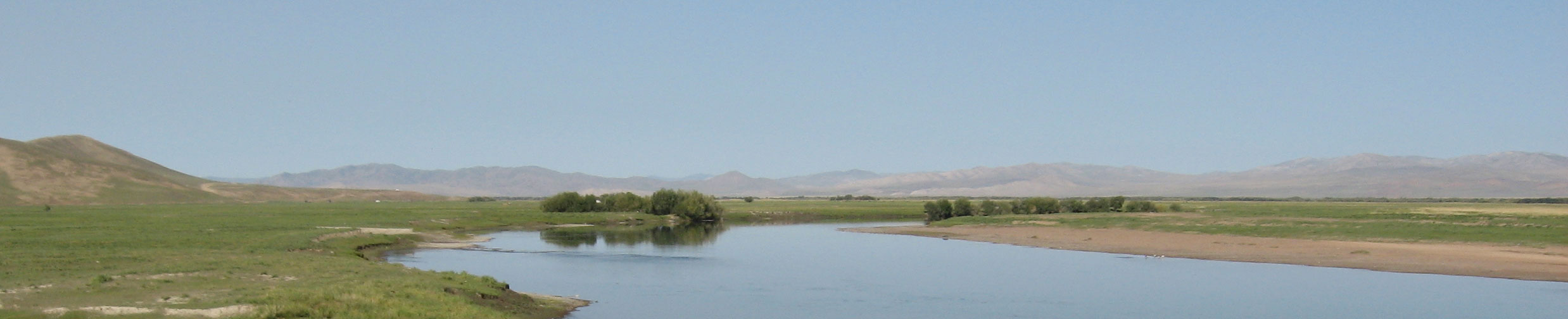
- Etymology: Mongolian: Delger mörön, "wide river")
- Native name: Дэлгэр мөрөн (Mongolian)

Location
- Country: Mongolia
- Aimags: Khövsgöl
- Major city: Mörön

Physical characteristics
- Source
  - location: Ulaan Taiga range
- Mouth: Selenge
  - location: Olon golyn bilchir
  - coordinates: 49°15′40″N 100°40′45″E
- Length: 445 km (277 mi)
- Basin size: 26,640 km^{2} (10,290 sq mi)

Basin features
- Progression: Selenga→ Lake Baikal→ Angara→ Yenisey→ Kara Sea
- Tributaries
  - left: Beltes River
  - right: Bügsiin River

The Delger mörön (Mongolian: Дэлгэр мөрөн, lit. 'wide river') is a river in the Khövsgöl aimag in northern Mongolia. It rises in the Ulaan Taiga range close to the Russian border. It is 445 kilometres (277 mi) long, and has a drainage basin of 26,600 square kilometres (10,300 sq mi).

Together with the Ider River, it is the headwaters of the Selenge River. It meets with the Ider at Tömörbulag, thereafter becoming the Selenge.

The Delger mörön is frozen for 128–175 days through the year. There is a ferry in Bayanzürkh, and a concrete bridge just south of Mörön.

== See also ==
List of rivers of Mongolia
