= Khudan (river) =

- Mouth location in Buryatia, Russia

Location
- Country: Russia
- Federal subject: Buryatia

Physical characteristics
- Source: Khudan Range; Selenga Highlands
  - coordinates: 52°03′54″N 111°41′44″E
  - elevation: 1,140 m (3,740 ft)
- Mouth: Uda
  - coordinates: 52°07′25″N 109°40′54″E
  - elevation: 649 m (2,129 ft)
- Length: 66 km (41 mi)
- Basin size: 787 km^{2} (304 sq mi)
- Discharge
  - average: 12.7 m^{3}/s (450 cu ft/s)

Basin features
- Progression: Uda→ Selenga→ Lake Baikal→ Angara→ Yenisey→ Kara Sea

The Khudan (Russian: Худан, also: Худун, Кудун, Кодун) is a river in Buryatia, southern East Siberia, Russia. It is 252 kilometres (157 mi) long, and has a drainage basin of 7,820 square kilometres (3,020 sq mi).

Its average flow rate at the mouth is 12.7 m³/s.

== Course ==
The Khudan is a left tributary of the Uda, of the Selenga basin. The river has its sources in the Khudan Range by the junction with the Tsagan-Khurtei range, 5 km (3.1 mi) to the northwest of 1,554 m (5,098 ft) high Mount Khudan, about 120 km (75 mi) west of Chita. The Khudan flows roughly in a WNW direction and meets the Uda 200 kilometres (120 mi) from its mouth in the Selenga. The river is generally frozen from mid-October or early November until April or May.

== See also ==
- List of rivers of Russia
