= Uda (Selenga) =

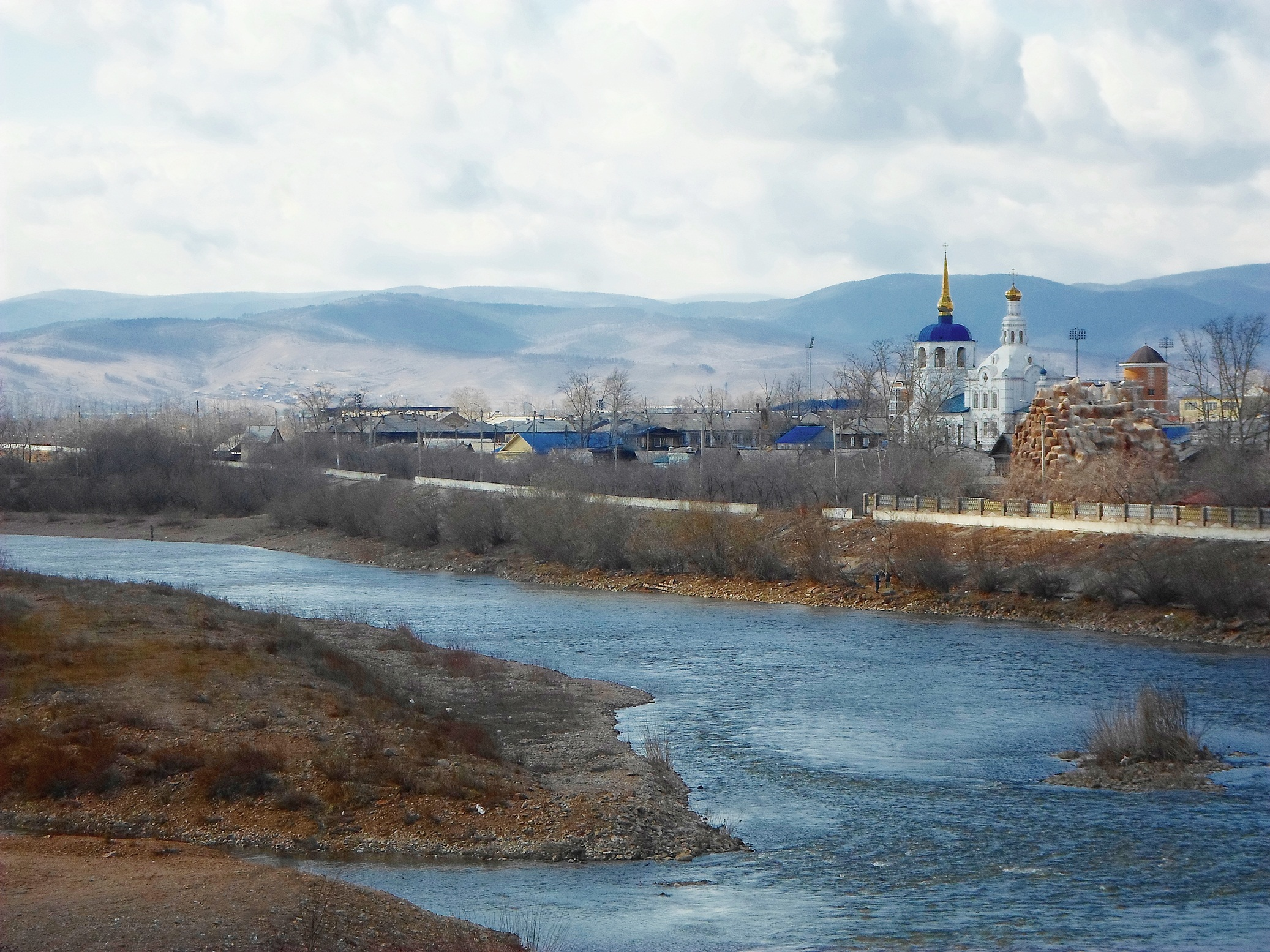
- The Uda river near Ulan-Ude

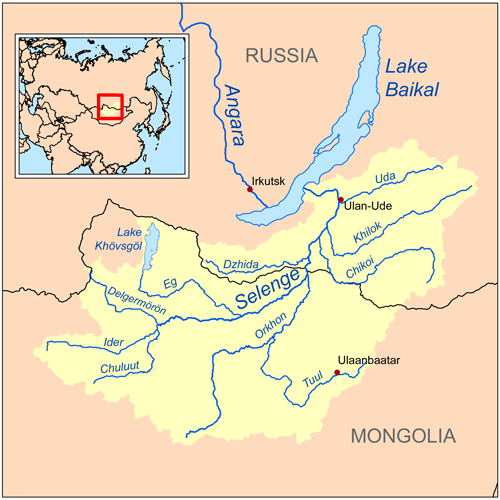
- The Uda as an east tributary of the Selenga
- Native name: Уда́ (Russian); Үдэ (Buryat)

Location
- Country: Russia
- Region: Buryatia
- Districts: Yeravninsky DistrictKhorinsky DistrictZaigrayevsky DistrictUlan-Ude

Physical characteristics
- Source
  - location: Vitim Plateau
  - coordinates: 52°33′03″N 112°11′37″E
- Mouth: Selenga
  - coordinates: 51°49′57″N 107°34′16″E
- Length: 467 km (290 mi)
- Basin size: 34,800 km^{2} (13,400 mi^{2})
- Discharge
  - average: 69.8 m^{3}/s (2,460 cu ft/s)

Basin features
- Progression: Selenga→ Lake Baikal→ Angara→ Yenisey→ Kara Sea
- Tributaries
  - left: Khudan

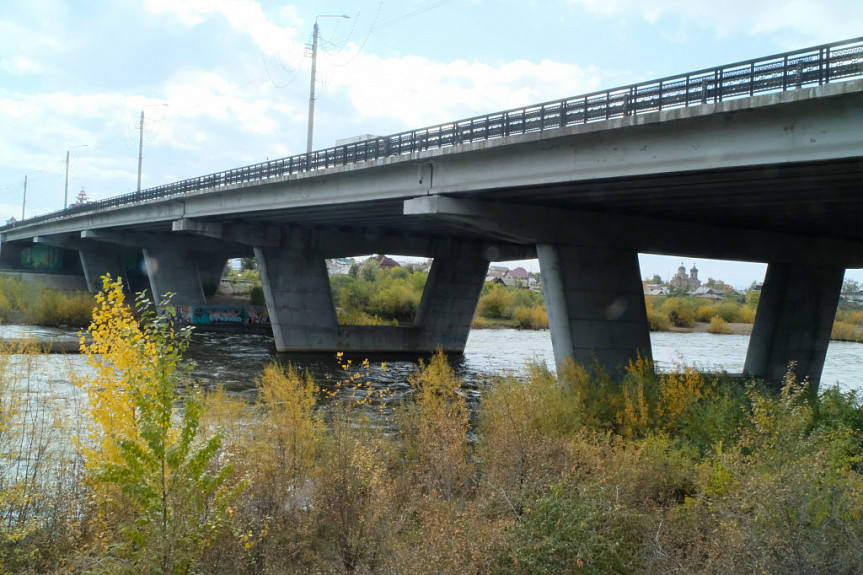
Bridge across the river Uda in the city of Ulan-Ude

The Uda (Russian: Уда́ [ʊˈda]; Buryat: Үдэ гол, romanized: Üde gol) is a river in the Buryat Republic, Russia. It is a right tributary of the Selenga, which it meets near the city Ulan-Ude. Its length is 467 kilometers (290 mi), and it has a drainage basin of 34,800 square kilometres (13,400 sq mi).

The Uda basin lies in the Tuguro-Chumikanskiy region. The word Uda is derived from the Yakut word üüt, meaning "milk". The name was conferred on the river owing to a nearby milk-colored lake.

== Fish ==
The Uda is a prime habitat for the pink, chum, red, and coho salmons. Other fish species found in the Uda include the Siberian taimen, two forms of lenok, and Amur grayling. The river is especially important as it remains one of the last strongholds of taimen, which have dwindled in other Siberian rivers. Taimens grow to huge sizes here; specimens weighing 95 kilograms (209 lb) have been caught here.

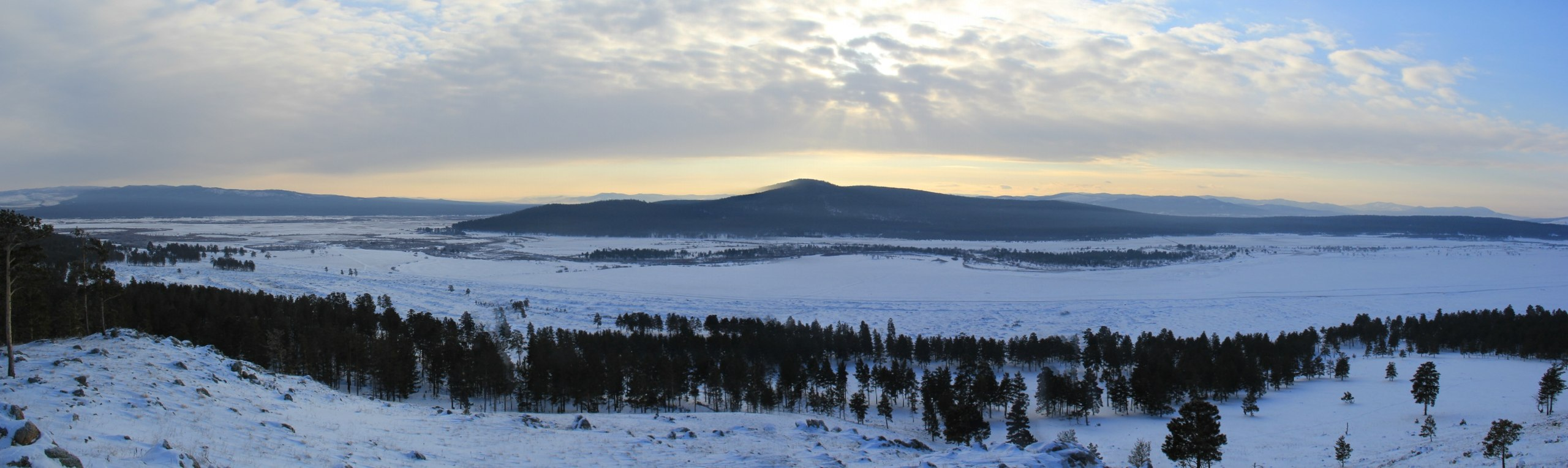
Valley of the Uda river near the village of Khorinsk the first of January

== See also ==
- Selenga Highlands
- List of rivers of Russia
