= Bible translations into Kalmyk =

== Conrad Neitz ==
The first Bible translation into the Kalmyk language was about 1750 by Conrad Neitz, Morovian missionary at Sarepta.

== Schmidt ==
Isaac Jacob Schmidt, a Moravian, translated the gospels, publishing Matthew in St. Petersburg in 1815. This was the first book to be printed in the Kalmyk language. The remaining gospels and Acts were published by 1821, and the whole New Testament by 1827.

== Pozdneev ==
In 1880 Aleksei Matveevich Pozdneev (1851–1920) and Archpriest Smirnoff were employed to translate Matthew. Prof. Pozdneev made two journeys to Astrakhan to work at the translation among the people; and in 1884 2,000 copies of the four gospels were authorised, new type being cut at the British and Foreign Bible Society's expense: the number was increased to 4,000 with 1,000 additional of each Gospel, and Gospels published in 1887.

On the death of Smirnoff, M. D. Kutusov, a native speaker of Kalmyk and lecturer in St. Petersburg University, assisted Pozdneev (1887). In 1887 Pozdneev visited Astrakhan, correcting his Acts and distributing Gospels; he also visited nomadic camps and read to all, including Buddhists. After three more journeys to the steppes he completed the New Testament, Acts to Revelation (Dordzhe Kulusoff assisted Pozdneev for this part of the translation). Printing was delayed by his having to undertake an expedition to Chinese Turkestan in 1893; but with the aid of Docent Pussell printing was completed in 1895. The individual gospels were reprinted again in 1896 by the British and Foreign Bible Society in Shanghai.

== Mather ==
Percy Mather also worked on Kalmyk Bible translation in Xinjiang, but his work seems to have been lost.

== IBT ==
The Institute for Bible Translation is working on a translation into modern Kalmyk. The New Testament is complete, and was published in 2002 as Шин Бооцан.

Translation	John (Йохан) 3:16
IBT, 2002	Юнгад гихлә, Бурхн орчлнд дегд хәәртә болад, Исуст иткдг күн үкл уга, мөңк җирһл эдлтхә гиҗ ор һанцхн Көвүһән өгсн мөн.
Transliteration	Yungad gixlә, Burxn orčlnd degd xәәrtә bolad, Isust itkdg kün ükl uga, möŋk ǧirhl edltxә giǧ or hantsxn Kövühәn ögsn mön.
Pozdneev 1885	ᡐᡄᠷᡄ ᡕᡇᡇᠨᡅ ᡐᡈᠯᡈᡃᡑᡉ ᡎᡄᡍᡉᠨᡄ ᠃ ᡋᡇᠷᡍᠠᠨ ᡅᠨᡇ ᡕᡅᠷᡐᡅᠨᡔᡉᡅᡎᡅ ᡕᡄᡍᡄᡑᡄ ᡐᠠᡃᠯᠠᡓᡅ ᡄᠨᡄᠷᡅᡎᠰᡄᡃᠷ ᡆᠨᡔᡆ ᡐᡈᠷᡈᡎᡑᡄᡎᠰᡄᠨ ᡍᡈᡋᡉᡉᡎᡄᡃᠨ ᡈᡎᡋᡈᡅ ᠃ ᡄᠨᡄ ᡎᡄᡍᡉᠯᡄᡃ ᠠᠯᡅ ᡍᡄᠨ ᡐᡈᡉᠨᡑᡉ ᡅᡐᡄᡎᡄᡎᡔᡅ ᡋᡉᡎᡉᡑᡄ ᡅᠨᡇ ᡉᠯᡉ ᡉᠷᡄᠨ ᡍᠠᠷᡅᠨ ᡏᡈᡊᡎᡉ ᠠᡏᡅᠨᡅ ᡆᠯᡍᡇᡅᠨ ᡐᡈᠯᡈᡃ ᡋᡉᠯᠠᡅ᠃
Transliteration	Tere yuuni tölöödü geküne, Burhan inu yirtincüigi yekede taalaji enerigseer onco törögdegsen köbüügeen ögböi. Ene gekvlee ali ken tüündü itegegqi bügüde in ülü üren harin möŋgü amini olhuin tölöö bolai.

== See also ==
Bible translations into the languages of Russia
