= Tömörbulag, Khövsgöl =

District in Khövsgöl Province, Mongolia

Coordinates: 49°17′57″N 100°15′39″E

Tömörbulag District Төмөрбулаг сум ᠲᠡᠮᠦᠷᠪᠤᠯᠠᠭᠰᠤᠮᠤ
- District
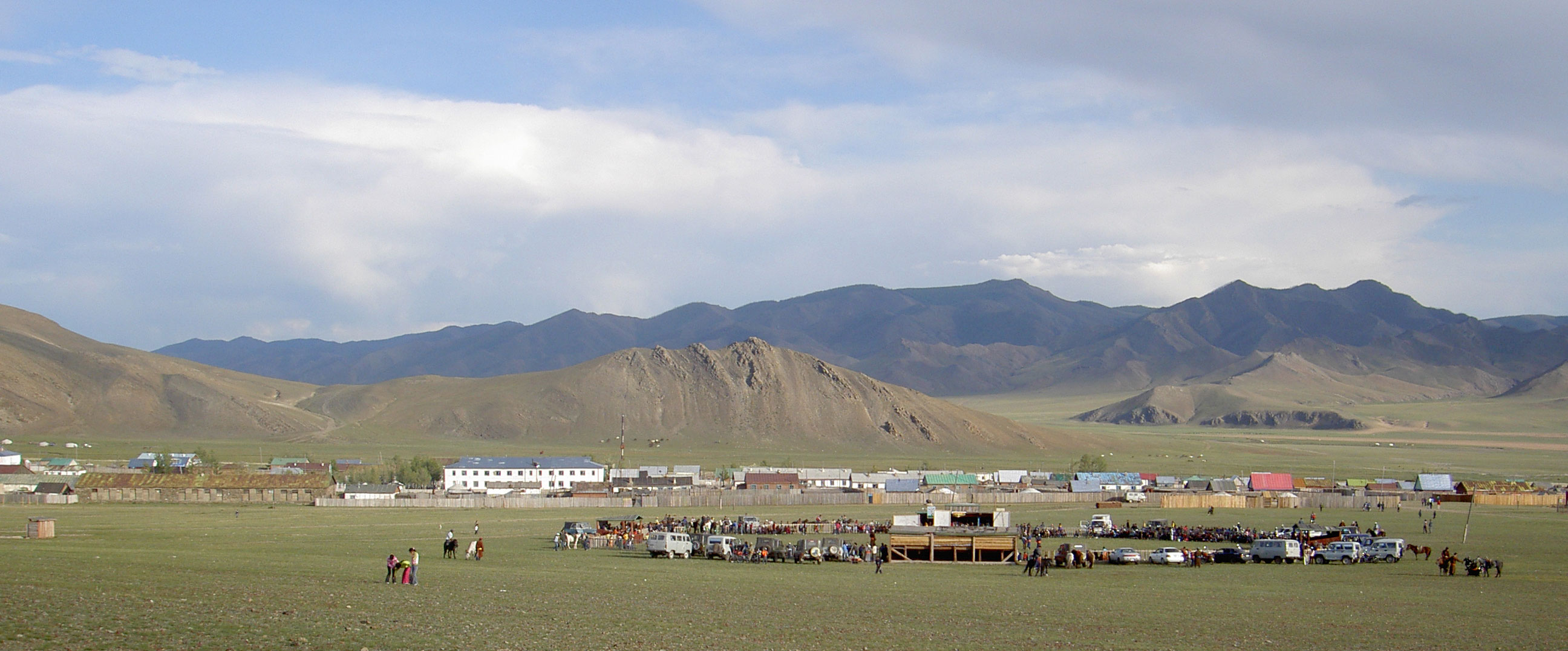
- Small naadam in Tömörbulag sum center, September 2007

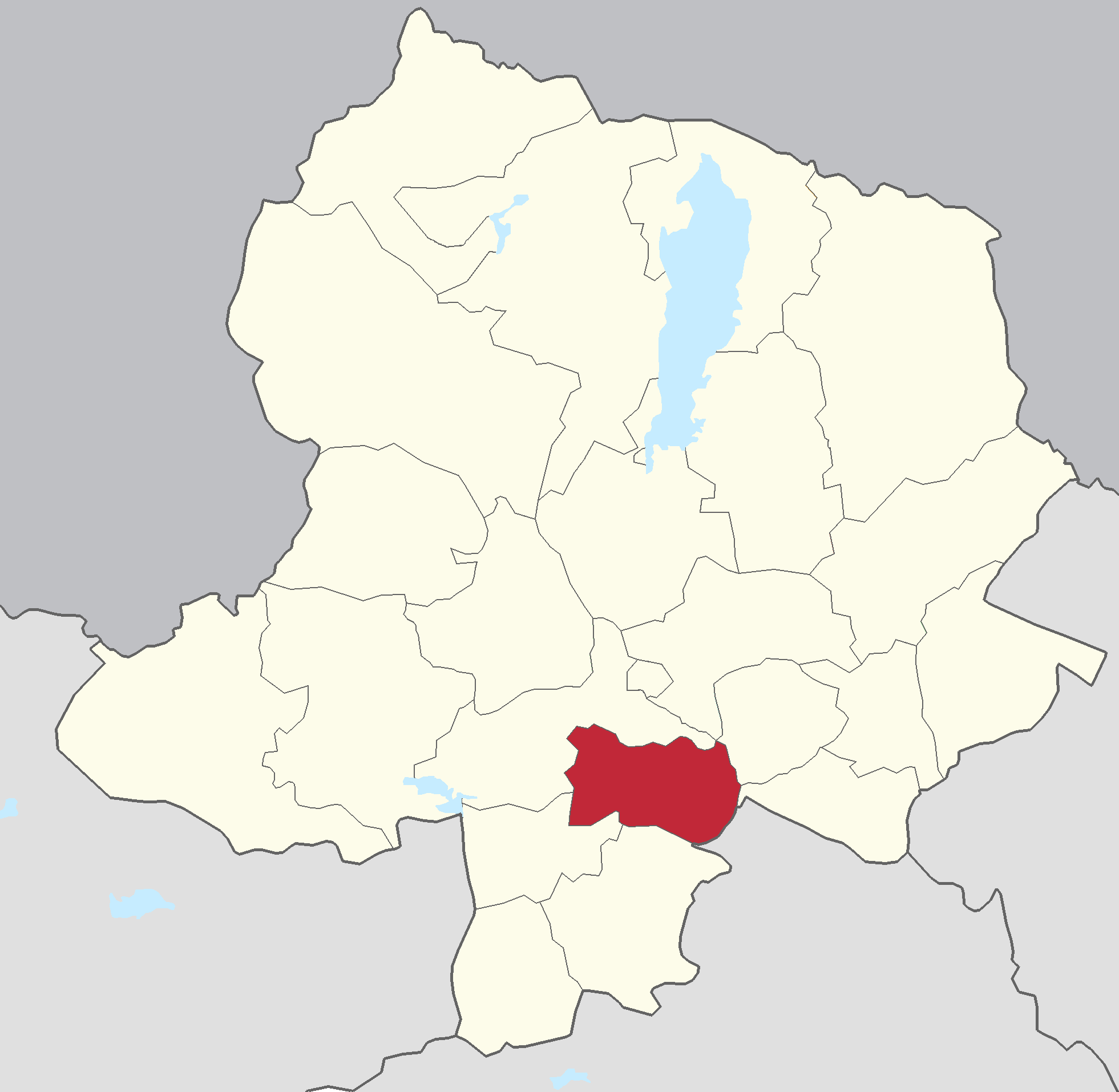
- Tömörbulag District in Khövsgöl Province
- Country: Mongolia
- Province: Khövsgöl Province
- Time zone: UTC+8 (UTC + 8)

Tömörbulag (Mongolian: Төмөрбулаг, iron spring) is a sum of Khövsgöl aimag. The area is 2,510 km^{2}, of which about 1,950 km^{2} are pasture. In 2000, Tömörbulag had a population of 4,174 people, including some Khotgoid. The sum center, officially named Jargalant (Mongolian: Жаргалант), is located near the Bügsiin River, 75 south of Mörön and 714 km from Ulaanbaatar.

== History ==
The Tömörbulag sum was founded, together with the whole Khövsgöl aimag, in 1931. In 1933, it had 3,000 inhabitants in 880 households, and about 96,000 heads of livestock. In 1956, it became part of Bürentogtokh sum, but was separated again in 1959. The local Dabshilt negdel was founded in 1934.

== Administrative divisions ==
The district is divided into five bags, which are:

- Jargalant
- Nariin
- Sumiin Tuv
- Tariat
- Teel

== Economy ==
In 2004, there were about 133,000 heads of livestock, among them 76,000 goats, 44,000 sheep, 6,700 cattle and yaks, 6,200 horses and 41 camels. The sum is especially known for a local breed of goats. A coal mine has opened in 1999. As of 2007, the sum center is neither connected to the electric power grid nor to cell phone services.

== Literature ==
M. Nyamaa, Khövsgöl aimgiin lavlakh toli, Ulaanbaatar 2001, p. 134f
