= Edward Stallybrass =

British Congregational missionary

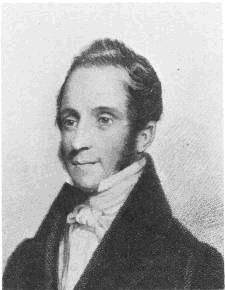
- Edward Stallybrass
- Born: 8 June 1794; Royston, Hertfordshire
- Died: 25 July 1884 (aged 90); Kent
- Occupations: Missionary, translator
- Spouses: Sarah Robinson; Charlotte Ellah

Edward Stallybrass (8 June 1794 in Royston, Hertfordshire – 25 July 1884) was a British Congregational missionary to the Buryat people of Siberia. He translated the Bible into Mongolian.

== Biography ==
A Congregationalist, Edward Stallybrass trained at Homerton College in London, a college for Free Church men who were at that time still barred from Oxford and Cambridge Universities. He was ordained at Stepney in 1816, and in the same year became engaged to Sarah Robinson (1789–1833). In 1817, they were married and both left for Russia the same year under the auspices of the London Missionary Society (LMS).

=== Mission in Russia ===
When Stallybrass arrived in Saint Petersburg in 1817, he was joined by Cornelius Rahmn (born 1785) from Gothenburg. Both men studied Russian, and in January 1818, having received authorisation to begin their missionary work, began the 4000-mile sledge journey to Irkutsk. On the way, they stopped in Moscow and were granted an audience by Alexander I of Russia, who told them that "he had given most positive orders...that every facility should be afforded" to the missionaries.

Arriving in Irkutsk, they soon found the area unsuitable; Stallybrass visited various places before setting up a mission station in Selenginsk (modern-day Novoselenginsk) in 1819, among the Buryat people; he was joined by two Scotsmen, William Swan (born 1791) and Robert Yuille (born 1786). Rahmn's wife was unable to handle the Siberian climate, and the Rahmns moved to Sarepta. Stallybrass and his company moved their mission to Khodon in 1828, where Sarah died and was buried in 1833. In 1835 Stallybrass returned to England via Denmark. In Copenhagen he married Charlotte Ellah; afterward, he returned to Siberia, where Charlotte died in 1839.

Work at the mission consisted of preaching, tract distribution, schools work and the translation of the Scriptures into the Buryat language. The mission was suppressed in 1840 by the Holy Synod of the Russian Orthodox Church under Alexander's successor, Nicolas I. (The mission was later re-opened in 1870 with Scottish missionary James Gilmour, but was now based in Beijing.) Stallybrass returned to England in 1841 and left the LMS.

=== Return to England ===
After his return, Stallybrass was headmaster of the Boys' Mission School, Walthamstow, and pastor at Hampden Chapel, Hackney. From 1858 to 1870 he was a pastor at Burnham, Norfolk. He died on 25 July 1884 in Kent, and is buried in Abney Park Cemetery in Stoke Newington.

== Translations ==
Translating scripture into the local languages was an important task for the LMS missionaries. From 1836 to 1840, they worked on translating scripture and publishing it at a mission press. In 1838, William Swan reported that the work on these translations was progressing. In 1840, the Mongolian translation of the Old Testament was published, and in 1846, Stallybrass republished his and Swan's Mongolian translation of the New Testament, a revision of an 1824 translation, in London.

== Bibliography ==
- Stallybrass, Edward; William Swan; Robert Yuille (1840). The Old Testament. British and Foreign Bible Society.
- Stallybrass, Edward; William Swan (1846). The New Testament of Our Lord and Saviour Jesus Christ. William Watts.
- Stallybrass, Edward (1836). Memoir of Mrs. Stallybrass. London: Fisher, Son, & Co.
