= William Swan (missionary) =

Scottish missionary

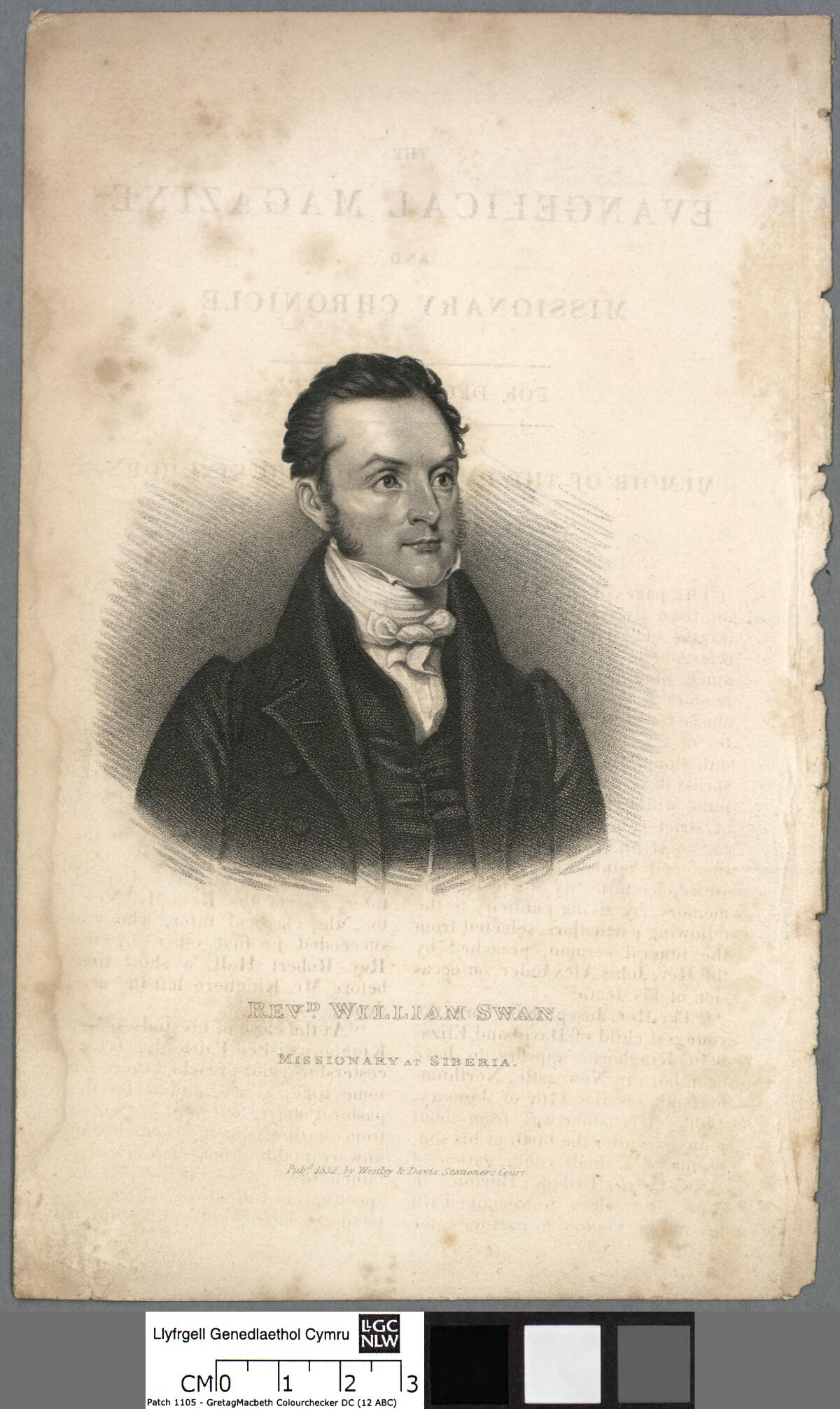
Shown circa 1832.

William Swan (21 June 1791, in Leven, Fife – 18 January 1866) was a Scottish Congregational missionary to the Buryat Mongols in Siberia for the London Missionary Society from 1820 to 1840. Along with Edward Stallybrass he translated the Bible into the Mongolian language.

== Early life ==
Little is known of Swan's parents who died before he became a missionary. Swan was born at Milton of Balgonie, near Leven, Fife in Scotland. He was talented at languages from an early age. He became an accountant or a lawyer (accounts differ) and worked in Kirkcaldy and Edinburgh. He became a fervent Christian and gave up worldly pleasures, such as boating, and his career in business. In 1816, he entered the Theological Academy in Glasgow and in 1817 applied to become a missionary with the London Missionary Society (LMS). His interest was in translating the Bible and he studied Biblical languages. He wanted to go to China, but instead was assigned to Siberia. Swan was accepted as a missionary on 16 March 1818, ordained on 3 June, departed for Russia, and was in St. Petersburg by 22 July.

Swan's essay in applying to become a missionary was a model of argument, exposition, and facility of language. He was described by author and traveler George Borrow as "one of the most amiable and interesting characters he had ever met."

== Russia and Siberia ==
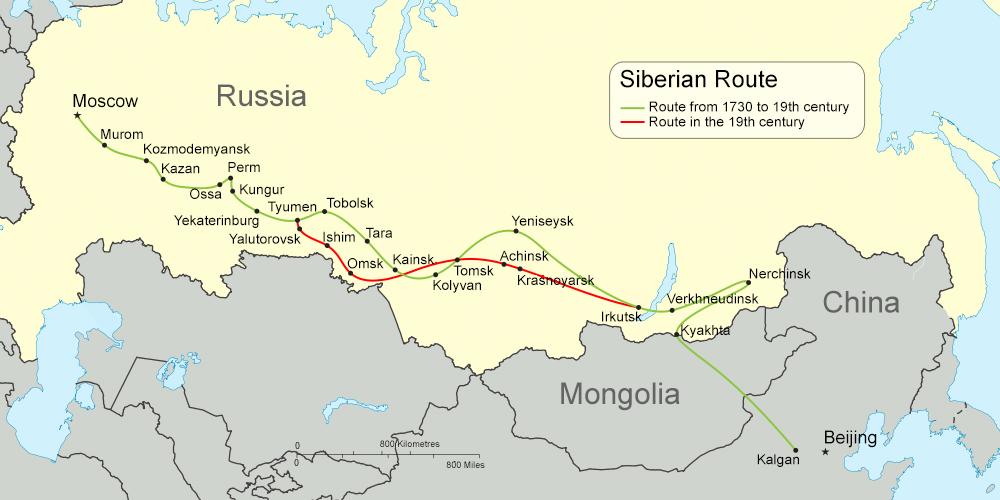
Swan followed the Siberian Route from Moscow to Irkutsck.

Swan stayed in St. Petersburg more than one year, studying the Russian and Mongol languages. He was joined there by Robert Yuille (b. 1786, Scotland). Swan and Yuille, accompanied by Yuille's wife, Margaret Cowie, left St. Petersburg. Winter was considered the best time to travel in Russia. Travel was by sleigh, first to Irkutsk, about 3,300 miles (5,300 km) by road (a journey of some 60 days using the Russian system of relay stations, changing horses every few miles) from St. Petersburg, and then onward another 200 miles (320 km) by a poor road to Selenginsk, now Novoselenginsk, in the territory of the Buryat Mongols, where Edward Stallybrass had founded a mission on 19 July 1819. Swan and the Yuilles arrived there in February 1820.

Buryatia at the time was the home of four competing religions: Orthodox Christianity, introduced by the Russians; Shamanism, the traditional religion of the Buryats; Tibetan Buddhism, growing in influence; and the Protestant Christianity of Stallybrass and Swan. The British missionaries had the approval of Tsar Alexander I of Russia, although they were forbidden to baptize Mongols. That was the prerogative of the official Russian Orthodox Church. (Most Mongols would become Buddhists during the 19th century.)

Stallybrass and Swan's principle task was to translate the Bible into the literary Mongol language rather than one of the many Mongol dialects. Initially they were well accepted by the Buryats and the Russians living in the region, but Alexander I, their patron, died in 1825. His successor, Czar Nicholas I, was less favorable to them. Moreover, there was dissention among the members of the mission although Swan and Stallybrass remained collaborators. In 1828, however, they moved to different locations.

In 1831, Swan returned to Scotland on home leave and while there married Hannah Cullen. When the couple returned to St. Petersburg they were unexpectedly detained by Swan's desire to acquire for the LMS a translation of the Bible into Chinese and Manchu. Swan spent several months transcribing the manuscript of the translation and the couple did not leave St. Petersburg to return to Buryatia until 15 December 1833.

Back in Buryatia, Swan and Stallybrass continued to seek permission to publish their Bible translation. The Russian government and the Orthodox Church were increasingly opposed to their presence and suppressed the Siberian mission in 1840, expelling the Swans and other missionaries. Their translation was not published until 1846.

== Later life ==
Back in Scotland in July 1841, Swan resigned from the London Missionary Society, foregoing a claim to expenses during his Siberian residence and donating to the society. IN 1844, he was teaching at the Glasgow Theological Academy and from 1845 to 1855 he became Secretary of the Scottish Congregational Union and edited the Scottish Congregational Magazine He retained his interest in Mongolia as a mission field. He died on 1 January 1866. His wife, Hannah, died in Edinburgh in 1890.
