= Bürentogtokh, Khövsgöl =

District in Khövsgöl Province, Mongolia

Coordinates: 49°37′02″N 99°35′28″E

Bürentogtokh District Бүрэнтогтох сум ᠪᠦᠷᠢᠨᠲᠣᠭᠲᠣᠬᠤᠰᠤᠮᠤ
- District
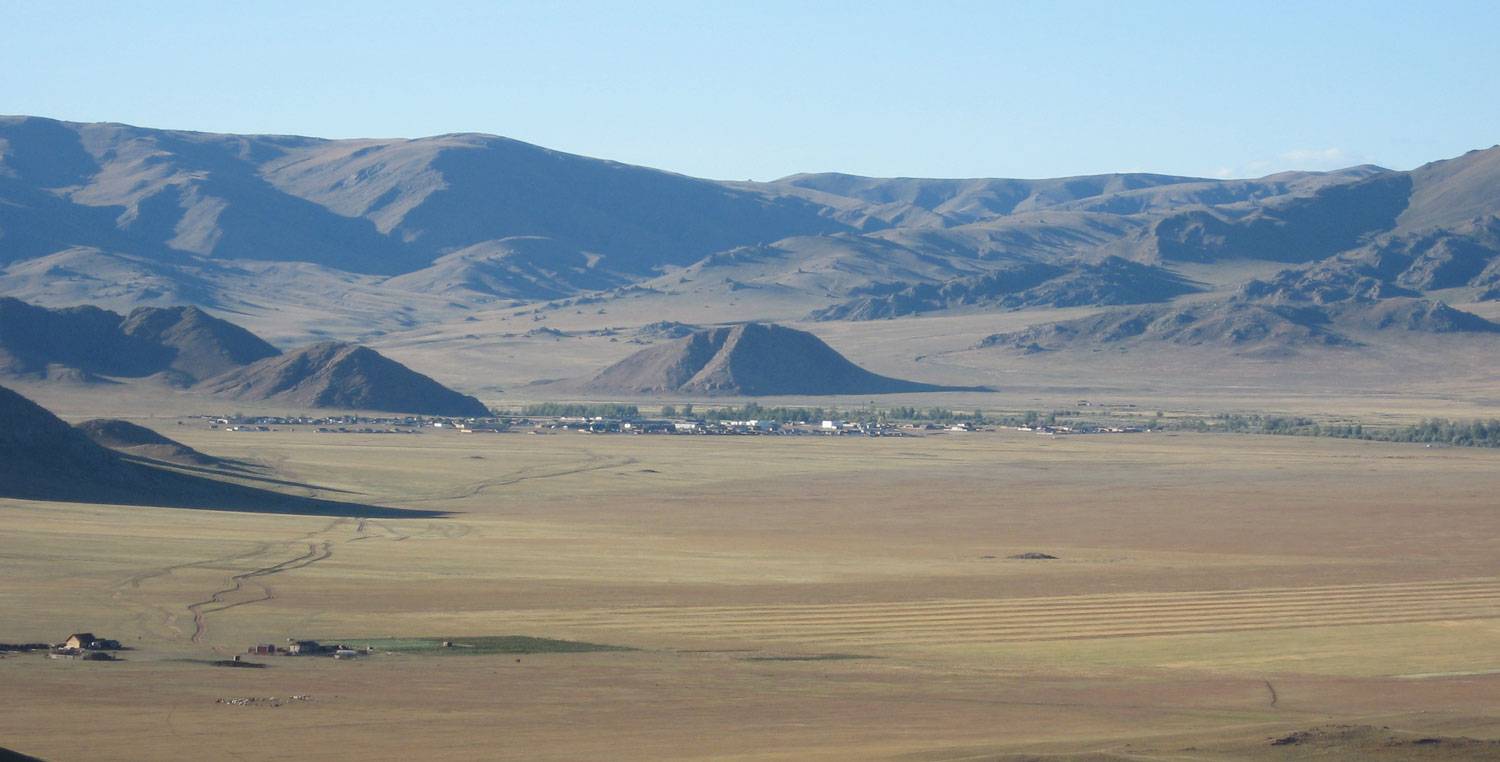
- Bürentogtokh sum center, September 2006

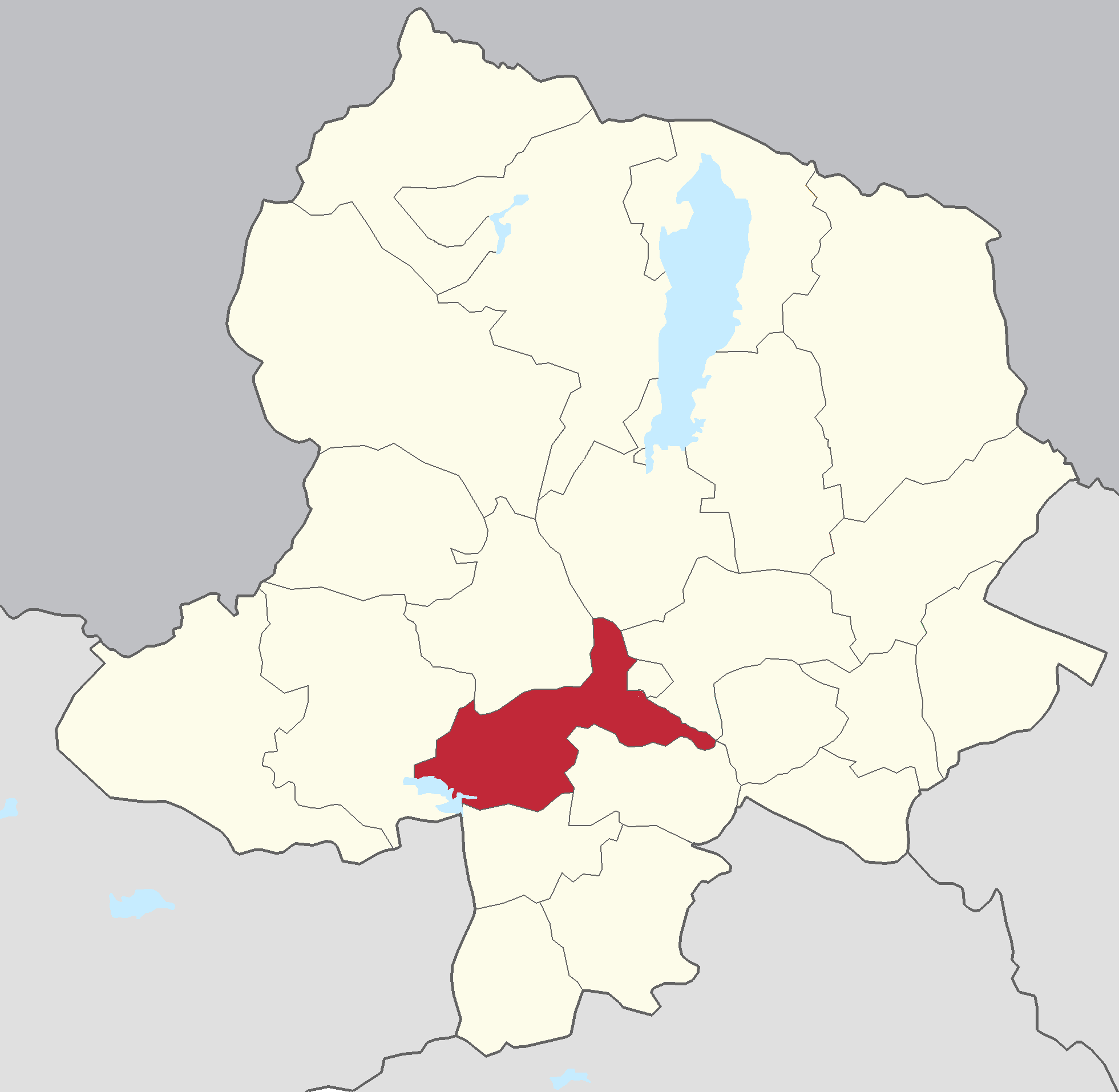
- Bürentogtokh District in Khövsgöl Province
- Country: Mongolia
- Province: Khövsgöl Province
- Time zone: UTC+8 (UTC + 8)

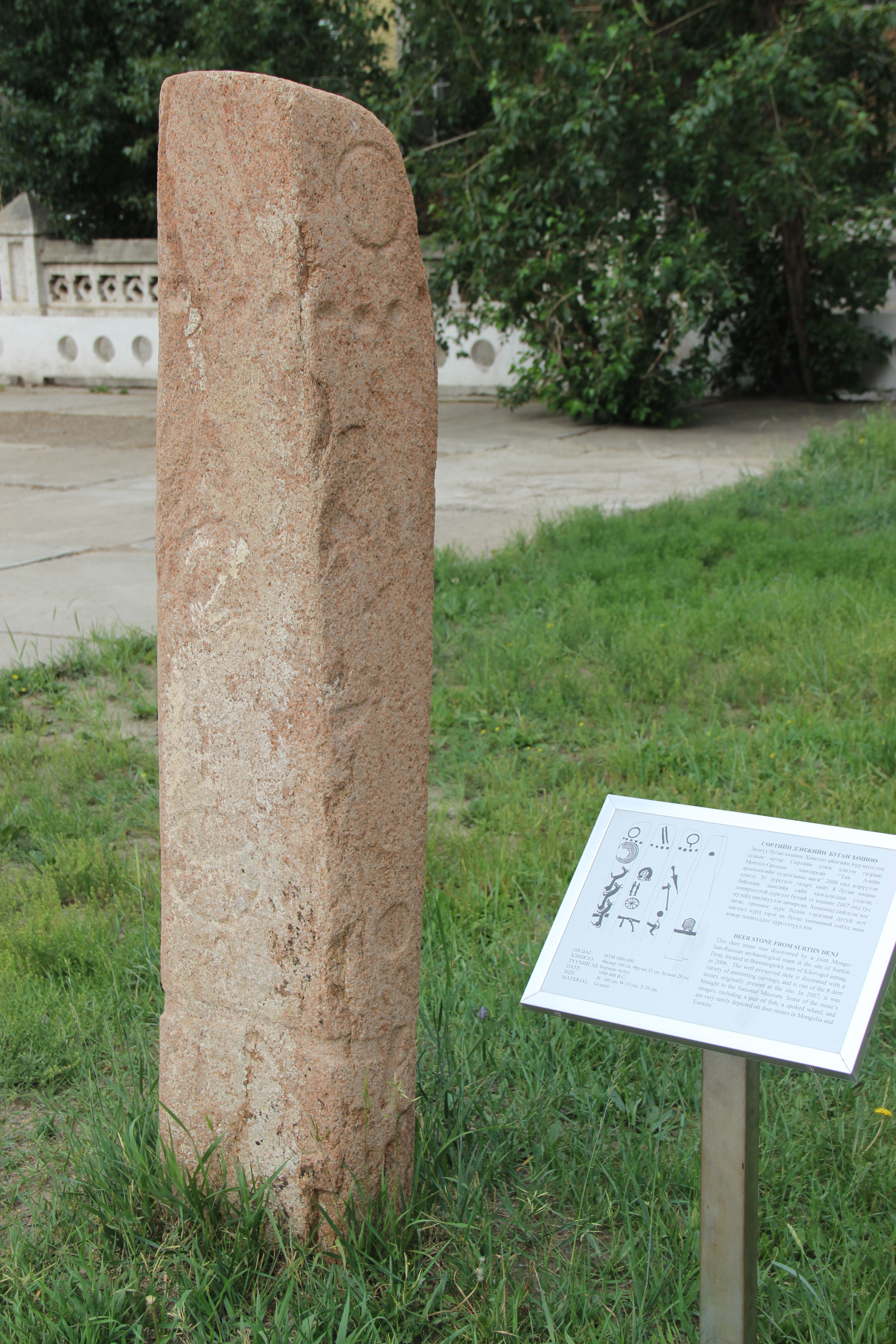
Deer stone from Surtiin Denj, Bürentogtokh, Khövsgöl

Bürentogtokh (Mongolian: Бүрэнтогтох, lit. "to set completely") is a sum (district) of Khövsgöl aimag (province of Mongolia). The area is about 3,760 km², of which 2,870 km² are pasture. In 2005, the sum had 4251 inhabitants, mainly Khalkha and Khotgoid. The center, officially named Bayan (Mongolian: Баян) is situated on the banks of the Delgermörön river, 51 km west of Mörön and 722 kilometers from Ulaanbaatar.

== History ==
Marshal Chingünjav, one of the two major leaders of a failed rebellion against the Manchu in 1755/6, was born at Sangiin Dalai nuur. The remains of his fort can still be seen a few km south of the sum center.

In 1877, Sodnomyn Damdinbazar was inaugurated as Jalkhanz Khutagt at Jalkhanzyn Khüree, located on the territory of what is now Bürentogtokh sum. He served as Prime Minister twice, 1921 in Baron Ungern's puppet government, and 1922/23 under the MPRP.

The Bürentogtokh sum was founded, together with the whole Khövsgöl aimag, in 1931. In 1933, it had about 2,600 inhabitants in 752 households, and about 90,000 heads of livestock. In 1973, the Büren and Bürenkhaan sums were dissolved and partially joined to Bürentogtokh sum. Between 1952 and 1990, Bürentogtokh was the seat of the Delgermörön negdel.

== Administrative divisions ==
The district is divided into six bags, which are:

- Bayankhoshuu
- Burenkhaan
- Erchim
- Ikh-Uul
- Sangiin Dalai
- Tuyaa

== Economy ==
In 2004, there were roughly 145,000 heads of livestock, among them 66,000 sheep, 63,000 goats, 8,500 cattle and yaks, 7,800 horses, and 190 camels. There is some coal mining in the area, as well as some (unused) phosphorite reserves. Around 2005, the sum center has been connected to the Mongolian Central Power grid via Mörön.

== Archaeology ==
The Uushigiin Uvur deer stones are located about 20 km west of Mörön and date to 1200-700 BCE. In 1953, the remains of a palace and a stele from the time of Mönkh Khaan were discovered on the border with Arbulag.

The sum borders Sangiin Dalai Lake.
