= Sangiin Dalai Lake =

Lake in Mongolia

- Mongolian: Сангийн далай нуур ᠰᠠᠩ ᠤ᠋ᠨ ᠳᠣᠭᠤᠳᠤ ᠨᠠᠭᠤᠷ
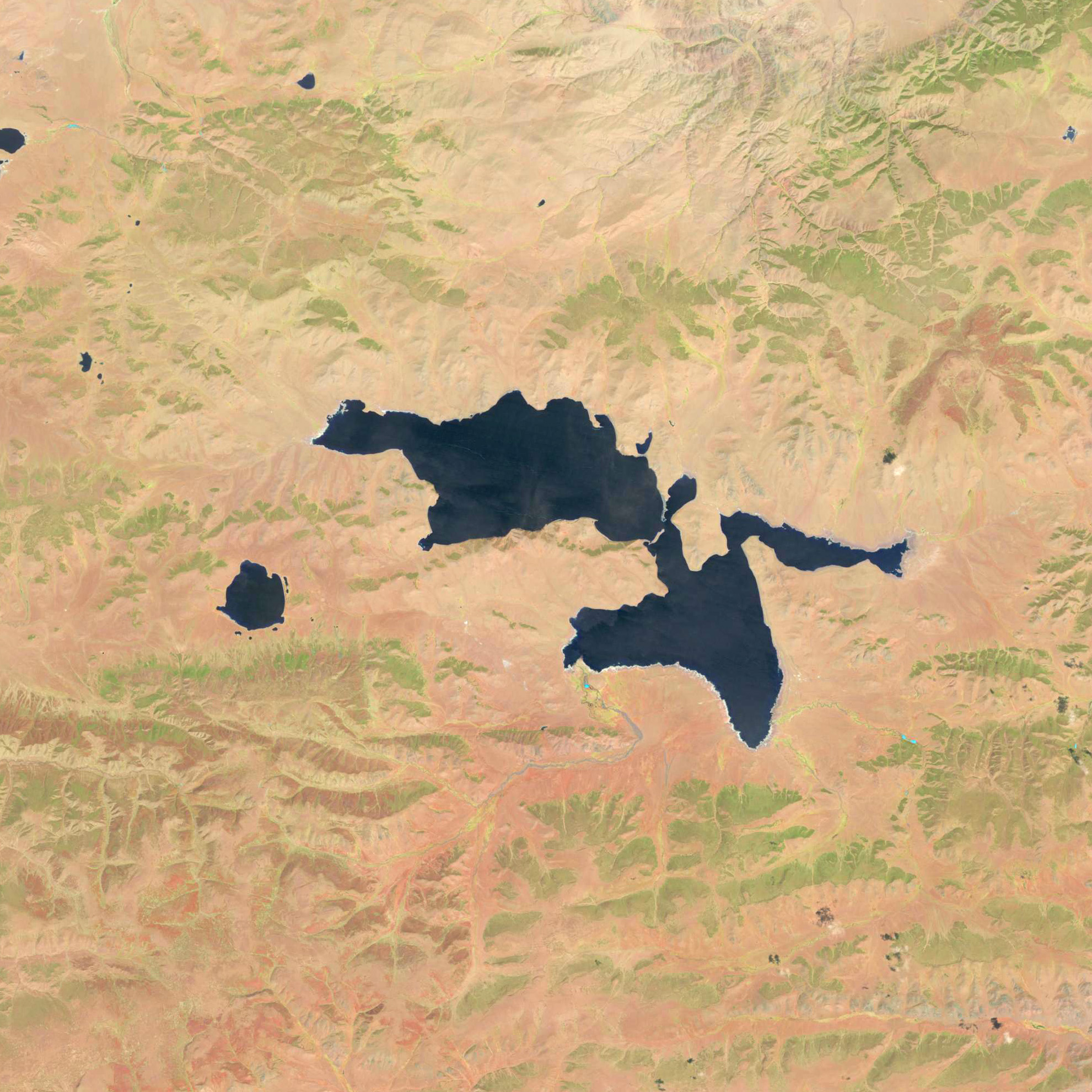

- Location within Mongolia
- Location: between Khövsgöl and Zavkhan aimags
- Coordinates: 49°15′N 99°00′E
- Type: salt water lake
- Primary outflows: none
- Basin countries: Mongolia
- Max. length: 32 km (20 mi)
- Max. width: 12 km (7.5 mi)
- Max. depth: 30 m (98 ft)
- Surface elevation: 1,988 m (6,522 ft)

Sangiin Dalai Lake (Mongolian: Сангийн далай нуур) is a salt water lake in northern Mongolia, located at the border between the Tsagaan-Uul, Shine-Ider, and Bürentogtokh sums of Khövsgöl aimag, and the Ikh-Uul sum of Zavkhan aimag. It is surrounded by mountains, hills, and rocks. The 8.4 M_{w} Bolnai earthquake occurred nearby on July 23, 1905.
