= Selenga =

River in Mongolia and Russia

Selenga Selenge
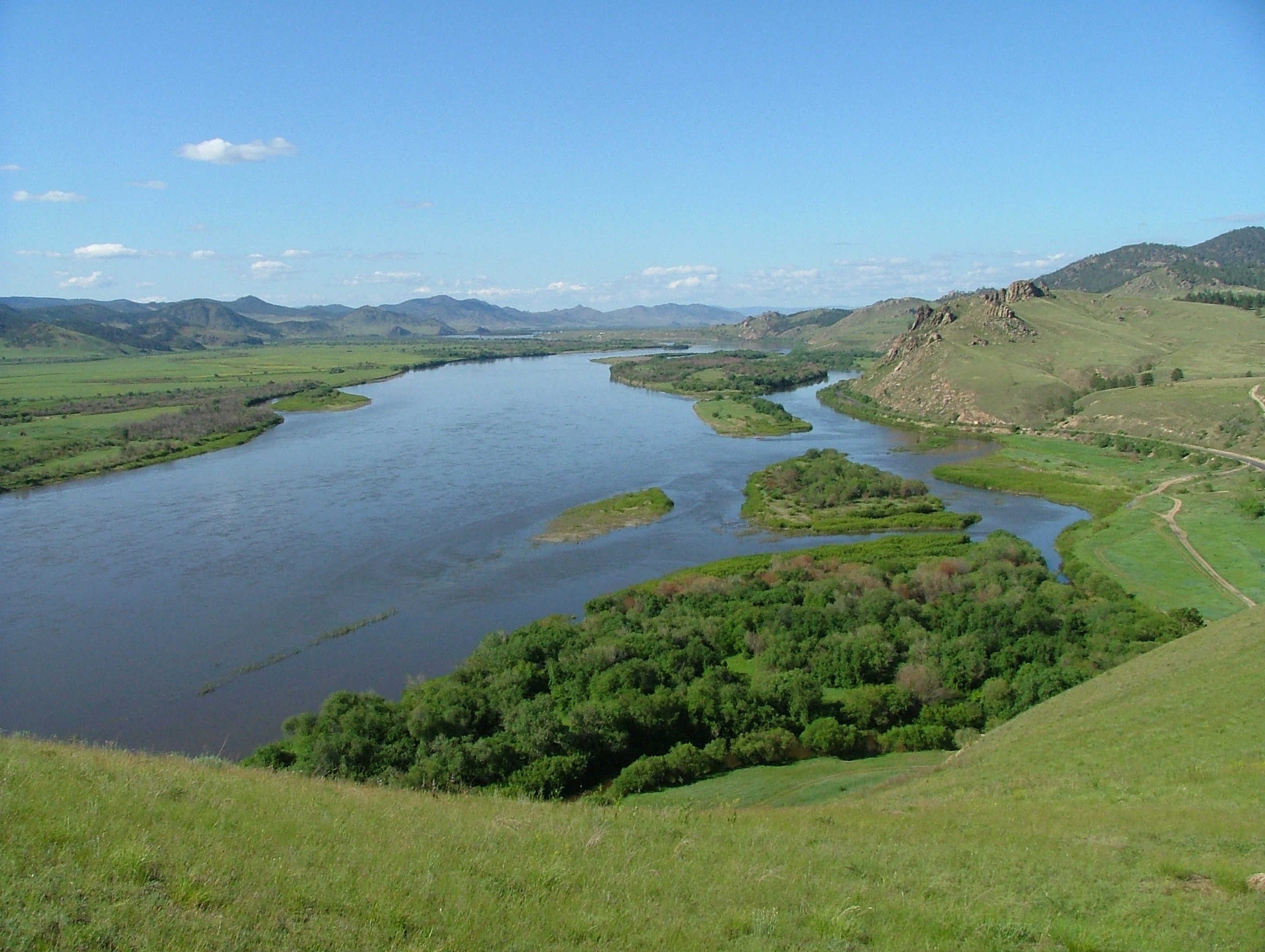
- Selenga River in Russia

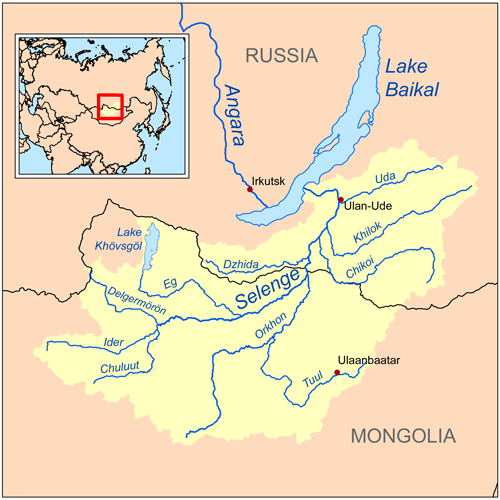
- Native name: Селенга (Russian); Сэлэнгэ (Mongolian)

Location
- Country: Russia, Mongolia
- Cities: Ulan-Ude

Physical characteristics
- Source: Delgermörön
- 2nd source: Ider
- Source confluence: Olon Golyn Bilchir
  - location: Khövsgöl, Mongolia
  - coordinates: 49°15′40″N 100°40′45″E
- Mouth: Lake Baikal
- Length: 992 km (616 mi)
- Basin size: 447,000 km^{2} (173,000 sq mi)
- Discharge
  - location: Ust-Kyakhta
  - average: 284 m^{3}/s (10,000 cu ft/s)
  - minimum: 23 m^{3}/s (810 cu ft/s)February
  - maximum: 601 m^{3}/s (21,200 cu ft/s)August

Basin features
- Progression: Lake Baikal→ Angara→ Yenisey→ Kara Sea
- Tributaries
  - right: Uda
- Basin coordinates: 46-52 degrees N 96-109 degrees E

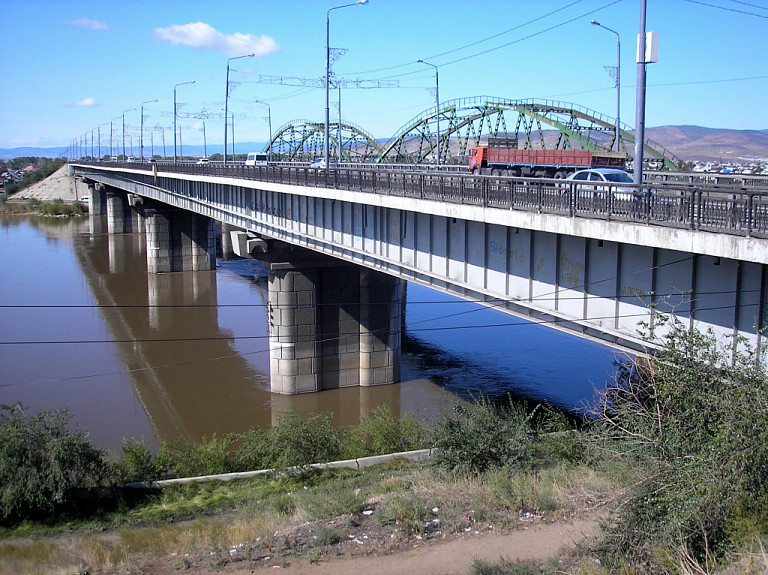
Bridge over the Selenga River in Ulan-Ude

The Selenga (/ˌsɛlɛŋˈɡɑː/ SEL-eng-GAH) (Note: Russian: Селенга, IPA: [sʲɪlʲɪnˈɡa]) or Selenge (Note: Mongolian: Сэлэнгэ мөрөн, romanized: Selenge mörön, IPA: [síɮiŋkɘ mɵ́rʉɴ]; Buryat: Сэлэнгэ мүрэн, romanized: Selenge müren, IPA: [ˈsɯləŋɡə ˈmurʉɴ], Old Turkic: 𐰾𐰠𐰭𐰀, romanized: Seleŋe) is a major river in Mongolia and Buryatia, Russia. Originating from its headwater tributaries, the Ider and the Delger mörön, it flows for 992–1,024 kilometres (616–636 mi) before draining into Lake Baikal. The Selenga therefore makes up the most distant headwaters of the Yenisey-Angara river system.

Carrying 935 cubic metres per second (33,000 cu ft/s) of water into Lake Baikal, it makes up almost half of the riverine inflow into the lake, and forms a wide delta of 680 square kilometres (260 mi^{2}) when it reaches the lake.

Periodic annual floods are a feature of the Selenga River. The floods can be classified as “ordinary”, “large” or “catastrophic” based on the degree of impact. Of the twenty-six documented floods that occurred between 1730 and 1900, three were “catastrophic”. The three “catastrophic” floods were the floods of 1830, 1869 and 1897.

The Selenga River basin is a semi-arid region occupying 280,000 square kilometres (110,000 mi^{2}). It is part of the Arctic Ocean Basin and mainly located in northern Mongolia. Stone implement artifacts found on the Selenga River at the end of the 19th century have been used to form a link between Native Americans and their ancestors in East Asia. The climate of the Selenga basin is influenced by the Siberian High, a powerful anti-cyclone, and consists of harsh winters, with the river freezing from November to April, and warm summers.

The Selenga River delta is a Ramsar site, surrounded by marshlands. Found in the administrative region of the Republic of Buryatia, the wetlands are the habitat of a large number of threatened and endemic species, including the Siberian Baikal sturgeon and over 170 species of birds. The Selenge-Orkhon forest steppe includes the areas of the Orkhon and Selenge river basins. The region has scattered forests and extensive mountain ranges.

River modifications like the Irkutsk Hydroelectric Power Station have affected the environment of the Selenga Delta, causing it to become waterlogged. Activities including mining, agriculture, breeding and dumping of wastewater have also affected the environment of the river. There has been an observed degradation of water quality from these anthropogenic factors. Natural factors like erosion processes and weathering have also contributed to the decline in water quality.

The proposed Shuren Hydropower Plant Project was protested against by environmental groups because of the potential ecological ramifications it would have on the Selenga Delta. The reasons cited included potential disruption to the flow of the river and the breeding grounds of endemic fish species in Lake Baikal.

== Name ==
The name Selenge comes from Mongolian seleh, which means "to swim". 'Selenga' is the russified version of the same.

An alternate source believes the name originated with the Evenki word sele ("iron") to which the possessive nge suffix was added.

The Selenge Province of Mongolia is named after the river.

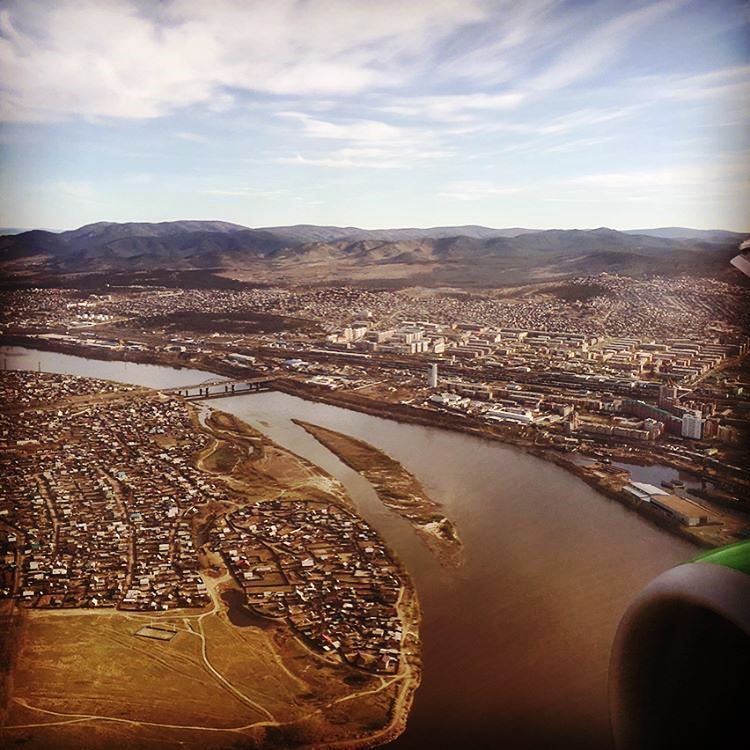
Automobile bridge over the Selenga River in the city of Ulan-Ude

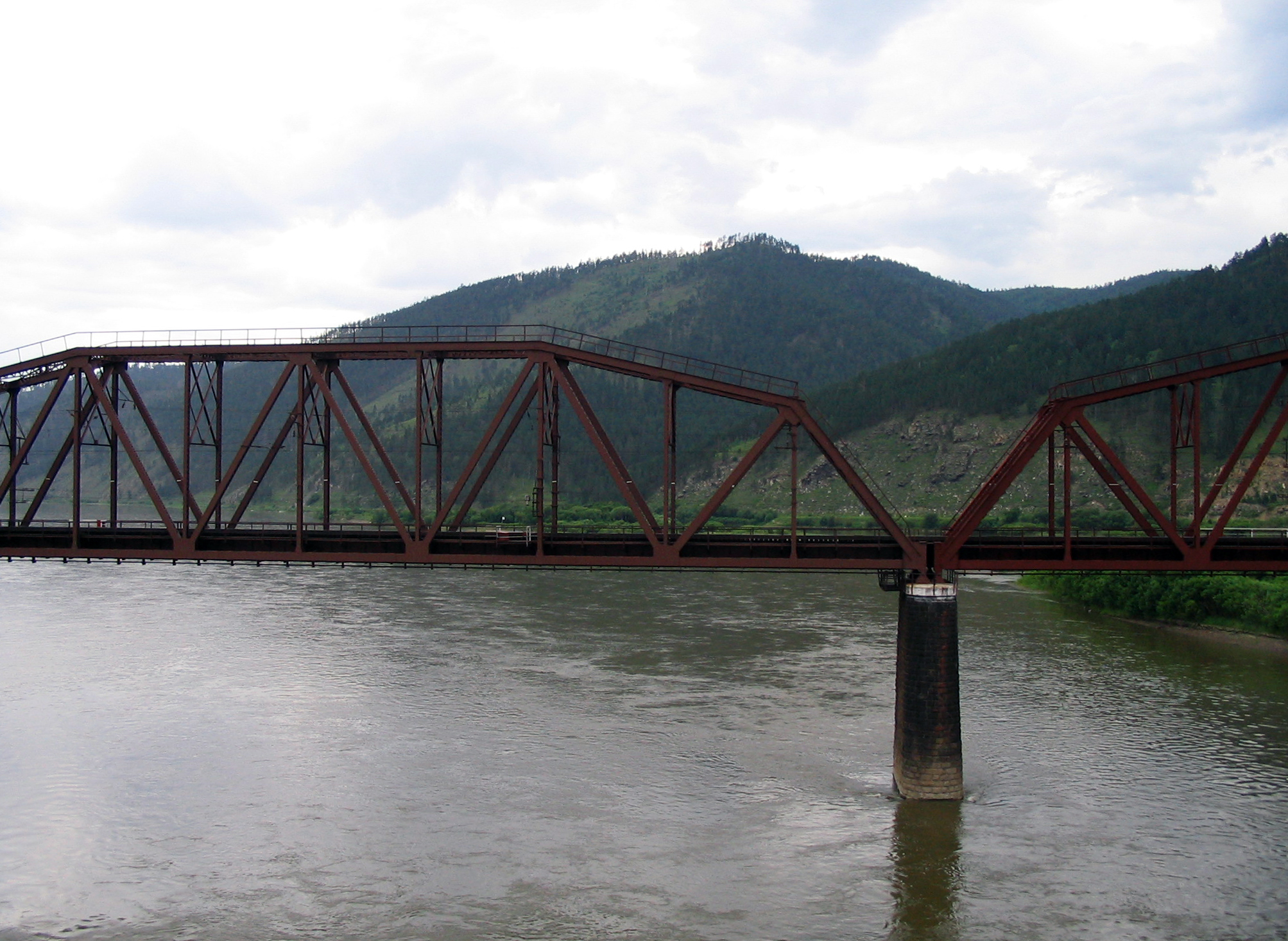
Railway bridge over the Selenga River outside of Ulan-Ude, Russia

== History ==
=== Archaeology ===
At the end of the 19th century, evidence of Paleolithic culture was discovered in the Selenga River basin. The artifacts found were collections of stone implements. During 1928 and 1929, G. P. Sosnovskii, under the purview of the Academy of Sciences of the U.S.S.R., directed an archaeological Stone Age study in the Selenga Valley near Kiakhta. In this expedition, Sosnovokii discovered remains of local Paleolithic culture in an area that stretched from "the valley of the Selenga River from the Mongolian Frontier down to Selenginsk."

The "Buriat-Mongol Archaeological Expedition from the Institute for the History of Material Culture, Academy of Sciences of the U.S.S.R and the Institute of Culture of the Buriat-Mongol A.S.S.R", undertook a Paleolithic study in the Trans-Baikal region from 1947 to 1958. Directed by A. P. Okladnikov, the study uncovered 30 new sites, including one that covered the area from Selenginsk to the Selenga River mouth, which provided evidence of a Paleolithic-type culture. Among these 30 sites was one called Ust-Kyakhta-3. While Ust-Kyakhta-3 was discovered in 1947, it was only later excavated in 1976 and 1978, yielding "more than 40,000 stone artifacts [and] abundant faunal remains". Further archaeological work in 2012 at the site found two human tooth fragments.

In a study published in volume 181 of the journal Cell, the link between Native Americans and their ancestors in East Asia was established using one of the tooth fragments found at the Ust-Kyakhta-3 site.

=== Floods ===
Periodic floods are characteristic of the Selenga River, with small flooding events observed annually. There have been four periods of high-flooding: 1902–1908, 1932–1942, 1971–1977 and 1990–1998. The floods of the Selenga River can be classified based on the degree of impact. "Catastrophic" floods refer to floods that cover the majority of the river basin and cause flooding of whole settlements. These floods included the possibility of human casualties, and are estimated to occur three or four times per century. Twenty-six floods occurred between 1730 and 1900, and of these 26, three floods were "catastrophic".

The flood of 1830 is the first flood that was recorded in some detail. On August 1, 1830, the Selenga River and its tributaries, the Chikoy, Dzhida, Khilok and Temnik Rivers, burst their banks. The flood plains and the islands in the Selenga River were completely flooded. On August 16, Verkhneudinsk, the city now known as Ulan-Ude, was flooded and the water level in the city reached 420 centimetres (13.8 ft). The flood destroyed fifty-four buildings in Selenginsk. After the flood, the town was moved to higher ground on the left bank of the Selenga River. There were also heavy losses in agriculture, with the flood making some pastures and hayfields unusable for an extended period after the flood. The river retreated to its banks by September 27.

Water levels began to rise on July 24, 1869, but slowly decreased from August 5, 1869, The water level began to rise again on August 22, only beginning to decline from September 3. In Verkhneudinsk, the water level reached 386 centimetres (12.66 ft), and in Lake Baikal, the water level rose by more than 2 metres (6.6 ft). The water level in the Angara River also rose and did not return to its pre-flood levels by January 1870.

The flood of 1897 began on August 11, when water levels started to rise in the middle and lower reaches of the Selenga River and reached its peak on August 14. The water level then proceeded to decrease gradually over ten days. On the first day of the flood, the water level rose by 4 metres (13 ft) in three hours. The water level in the Selenga River was over 350 centimetres (11.5 ft) near Verkhneundinsk. The flood did not heavily impact settlements on the banks of the Selenga River, but there were reports of bridge and telegraph pole destruction between the towns of Selenginsk and Verkhneundinsk. The volume of water inflow into Lake Baikal during the 1897 flood is estimated to have been approximately 22.2 cubic kilometres (5.3 mi^{3}). Flooding from the Selenge River can affect the environment of Lake Baikal. It can also cause an increase in runoff from the Angara River.

== River course ==
The Selenga River is 1,480 kilometres (920 mi) long and is formed from the convergence of the Ider and Delger rivers. It flows from Mongolia and into east-central Russia, acting as the main tributary of Lake Baikal. The Delger River flows from the Sangilen Mountains, "found on the border between Mongolia and the Russian republic of Tyva", while the Ider's headwaters are located in the Hangyn Mountains in central Mongolia. Upon the meeting of the Delger and Ider Rivers, the Selenga River moves northeast from Mongolia and joins with the Orkhon River at Suhbaatar. The river then continues north into Russia. Once in Russia, the river turns eastward towards Ulan-Ude, the capital of Buryatia and then goes northwards to Tataurovo. The Selenga proceeds to move westwards and then "flows through a delta into Lake Baikal."

=== Climate ===
A powerful Siberian anti-cyclone is the major influence on the climate of the Selenga basin. It is formed in September and October and disappears in April and May. Due to the anti-cyclone, the 448,000 square kilometres (173,000 mi^{2}) basin has a climate of harsh winters, which consist of sunny days and low air temperatures, and warm summers. The river experiences "...extended summer floods and short occasional (event-driven) floods in the other seasons."

The section of the Selenga River from Suhbaatar to its mouth is ice-free from May to October. Travel across the river is possible during this period. From November to April, the river is covered with ice. The ice drift lasts from 3–6 days. From May to September, in spring and early summer, snowmelt enables maximum discharge.

For 80–90 days, starting in mid-June, the basin area experiences the summer season with precipitation totaling 250–300 millimetres (9.8–11.8 in). This is in contrast to autumn and winter, in which rainfall is typically 150–200 millimetres (5.9–7.9 in). In mid-September, autumn begins, lasting for about 65 days.

== Tributaries ==
The largest tributaries of the Selenga are, from source to mouth:

- Ider (right)
- Delger mörön (left)
- Khanui (right)
- Egiin Gol (left)
- Orkhon (right)
- Dzhida (left)
- Chikoy (right)
- Khilok (right)
- Uda (right)

== Watershed ==
The Selenga River basin is part of the larger international Arctic Ocean Basin and is located in northern Mongolia. A semi-arid region and Mongolia's largest basin, the basin occupies 280,000 square kilometres (110,000 mi^{2}). The basin has two main rivers: the Selenga and its chief tributary, the Orkhon. The "major sub-basins are the Egiin, Ider, Orkhon and Tuul river basins" with Lake Baikal occupying 47% of the Selenga River basin. The terrain of the basin is dominated "by forest or grassland and is underlain by permafrost" according to an article published in 2003 by Ma et al.

Lobate shaped and 40 kilometres (25 mi) wide, the Selenga River delta is surrounded by marshlands. The formation of the delta is dependent on the sediment load carried by the river, with the lake tides having little impact in terms of geographical change. The sediment balance of the delta is dependent on physical processes, and this, in turn, affects the geochemical barrier functions of the area. During the period of the Irkutsk dam construction (1950–56), there was "increased sediment delivery to the delta" according to an article published in 2017 by Chalov et al. The wetlands of the Selenga River delta are classified as a Ramsar site and are found within the administrative region of the Republic of Buryatia. The wetlands support a large number of threatened and endemic species, including over 170 species of bird. The area has mean air temperatures of 14 °C (57.2 °F) in July and −19.4 °C (−2.9 °F) in January, with floods often occurring in summer after heavy rains.

The Selenge-Orkhon forest steppe is a palearctic ecoregion that is a medium between steppe and taiga. The region includes the Orkhon and Selenge river basins, and features scattered forests as well as extensive mountain ranges. The mean altitude of the landscape is 800 to 1,200 metres or 2,600 to 3,900 feet, with flora like Rosa acicularis found at lower altitudes. The area has a dry climate influenced by warm winds from the northeast steppe regions.

== River modifications ==
The construction of Irkutsk Hydroelectric Power station began in spring of 1950 and was completed on December 29, 1956. Built on the Angara River, the station was designed to raise the water level of the Angara River to match the water level of Lake Baikal. It would then raise the water level of Lake Baikal by 1.5 metres or 4.9 feet. The power plant causes water-level fluctuations in Lake Baikal, which in turn causes part of the Selenga Delta to become waterlogged. The delta is drained in response to activities at the power station.

In 2015, Mongolia was reported to be planning the construction of a dam, named the Shuren Hydropower Plant, on the Selenga River. Environmental groups protested this plan, as they were concerned with the potential ecological ramifications, building a hydroelectric plant on the Selenga River, would have on the ecosystem of Lake Baikal. Disrupting the flow of the river would disturb the breeding grounds of many endemic fish species in Lake Baikal. This would have a flow-on effect on the rare birds and aquatic species that inhabit the area. The Shuren Hydropower Plant Project was proposed in 2013 and was under the review of a World Bank-funded environmental and social impact assessment. On September 27, 2017, the World Bank froze its tender process on the Shuren Hydropower Plant Project.

== Natural history ==
=== Fish ===
Leocottus kesslerii gussinensis and Leocottus kesslerii arachlensis are endemic subspecies of fish that are found in the Selenga River headwaters and the upper Khilok River. Lake Baikal is the habitat of the Siberian Baikal sturgeon. The Selenga river is a breeding ground for the sturgeon, with migration taking place within the river system. The fish has two migration periods, which occur during the warmer part of the year. The first migration period begins in the second half of April when the water temperature is 3 to 5 °C or 37 to 41 °F, and finishes in approximately mid-June. The second migration of the Baikal sturgeon is the main migration period. It coincides with the summer floods of the Selenga. When the water temperature begins to cool, this signals the end of the migration. There is also a non-migrating species of sturgeon that inhabits the Selenga catchment.

=== Birds ===
Large populations of migrating, breeding and moulting waterbirds assemble at the wetlands in the Selenga Delta, which has been recognised as an Important Bird Area by BirdLife International. Migratory species include:

- Siberian crane, Grus leucogeranus
- Black stork, Ciconia nigra
- Bewick's swan, Cygnus bewicki
- Swan goose, Anser cygnoides
- Imperial eagle, Aquila heliacal
- Golden eagle, A. chrysaetos
- Peregrine falcon, Falco peregrinus
- Gyr falcon, F. gyrfalco
- Saker falcon, F. cherrug

Breeding species include:

- White-tailed eagle, Haliaeetus albicilla
- Snipe-billed godwit, Macrorhamphus semipalmatus
- Whooper swan, Cygnus Cygnus
- Spotbill duck, Anas poecilorhyncha
- Falcated duck, A. falcata
- Bittern, Botaurus stellaris
- Baillon's crake, Porzana pusill
- Water-rail, Rallus aquaticus
- Corncrake, Crex crex
- Short-eared owl, Asio flammeus
- Azure tit, Parus caeruleus

=== Other fauna ===
The Selenga delta also supports the following species:

- Baikal grayling, Thymallus arcticus baicalensis infrasubspecies brevioinnis
- Mongolian toad, Bufo raddei
- Rana terrestris
- Ikonnikov's bat, Myotis ikonnikovi
- Brown long-eared bat, Plecotus auritus
- Parti-coloured bat, Vespertilio murinus
- V. nilssoni

== Water quality ==
Before the turn of the millennium, the Selenga River and Lake Baikal had rich aquatic ecosystems nearly untouched by human influence. Since the collapse of the Soviet Union in the 1990s, the basin, which contains vast plains, has been affected by agricultural, climatic and economic factors. This includes changes like forest losses, urbanization and a growth in farming and mining activities.

Factors that affect the water quality of the Selenga River can be classified as either anthropogenic or natural factors. Anthropogenic factors include mining activities, agriculture, breeding, dumping of wastewater into water bodies and water use. Natural factors include erosion processes and weathering. The escalation of anthropogenic factors can be correlated with pollution by "potentially toxic elements, including metals and persistent organic pollutants." Mongolia has had rapid growth in GDP since 1999, fueled by agriculture, mining and light industry. These activities, particularly mining, have threatened the surface water quality of the Selenga River and adjacent groundwater.

A study published in volume 12 of the journal Water, found that based on the Mongolian National Standard, "the main pollutants of the Selenga River are Zn ... As ... and Pb ..." They also found that metal content in the river water was tens or hundreds of times higher in sites closer to urban and mining areas. Based on data observing toxicological and bioaccumulation effects on aquatic biota, the contamination has been shown to have an ecological impact.

== Human use ==
The Selenga River has an influential role in managing the economic futures of Mongolia and Russia. It is used extensively for activities that include hay harvesting, mining, grazing, commercial and sport fishing. Many of these uses contribute to the degradation of the river's water quality, with the main Mongolian sources of pollution, including the Zaamar gold placer, the Shar River gold mining, settlements and agriculture.

The city of Ulan-Ude uses the Selenga River as its primary source of water for its municipal water supply, using 60 wells with submersible pumps to withdraw water. The total pumped water in 2009 was 56.68 million cubic metres (14.97 billion US gallons). There are ten large-scale wastewater treatment plants in the Selenge River basin in Mongolia. These wastewater treatment plants are located in the Mongolian cities of Tsetserleg, Bulgan, Darkhan City, Uliastai, Erdenet City, Arvaikheer, Sukhbaatar, Zuunmod, Murun and Ulaanbaatar.

== See also ==
- Baikal sturgeon
- Irkutsk Hydroelectric Power Station
- List of rivers of Mongolia
- List of rivers of Russia
- Selenga Highlands
- Ulaanbaatar
