= La Loma Cemetery =

Cemetery in Manila and Caloocan, Philippines

La Loma Catholic Cemetery
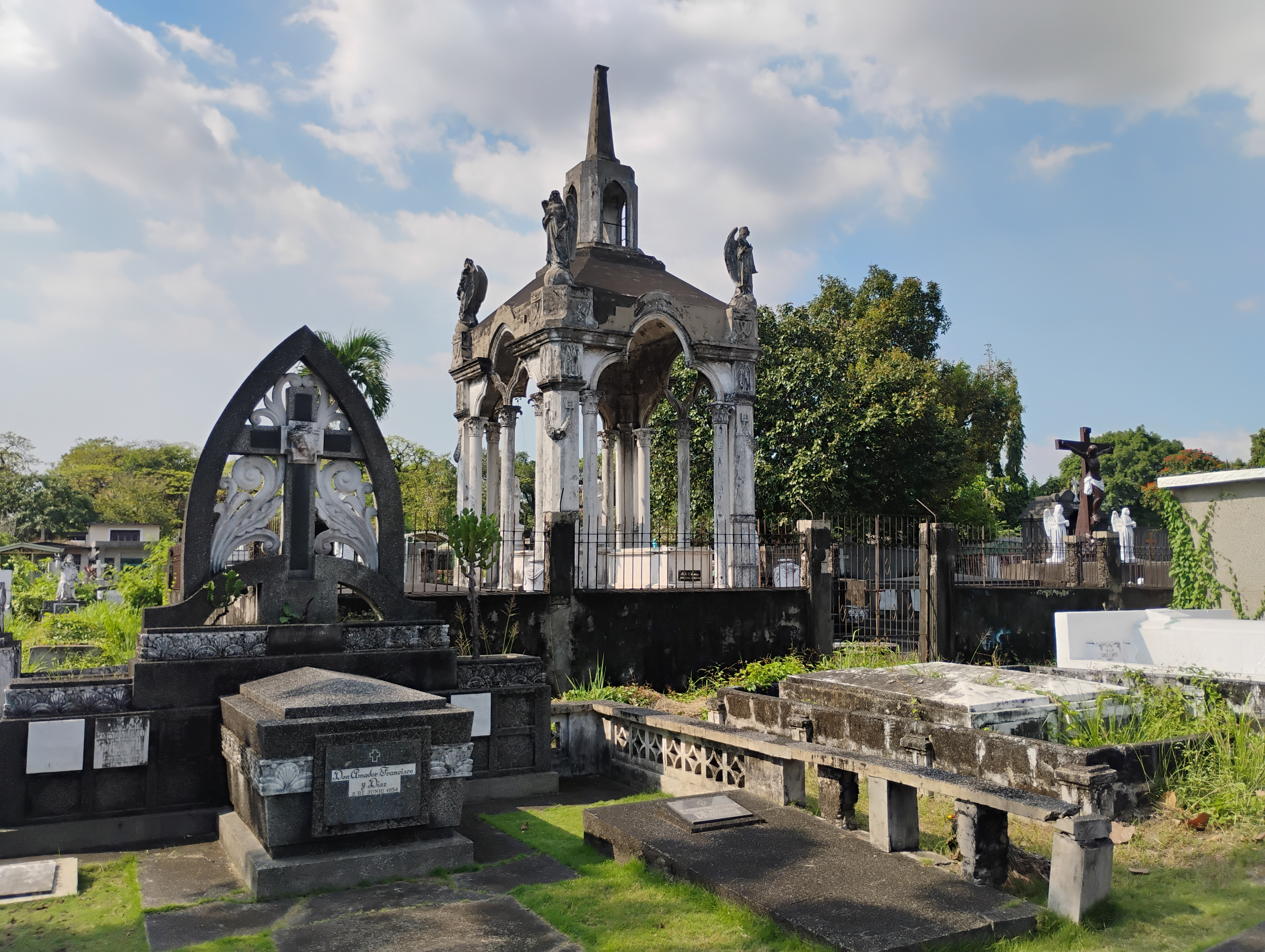
- Interactive map of La Loma Catholic Cemetery

Details
- Established: 1884
- Location: Manila and Caloocan, Metro Manila
- Country: Philippines
- Coordinates: 14°38′36″N 120°59′17″E
- Type: Catholic
- Owned by: Diocese of Kalookan and Archdiocese of Manila
- Size: 54 hectares (130 acres)

The La Loma Catholic Cemetery (Spanish: Campo Santo de La Loma) was opened in 1884 and is largely located in Caloocan, Metro Manila. A portion of the southern part of the cemetery is located in Manila.

== History ==
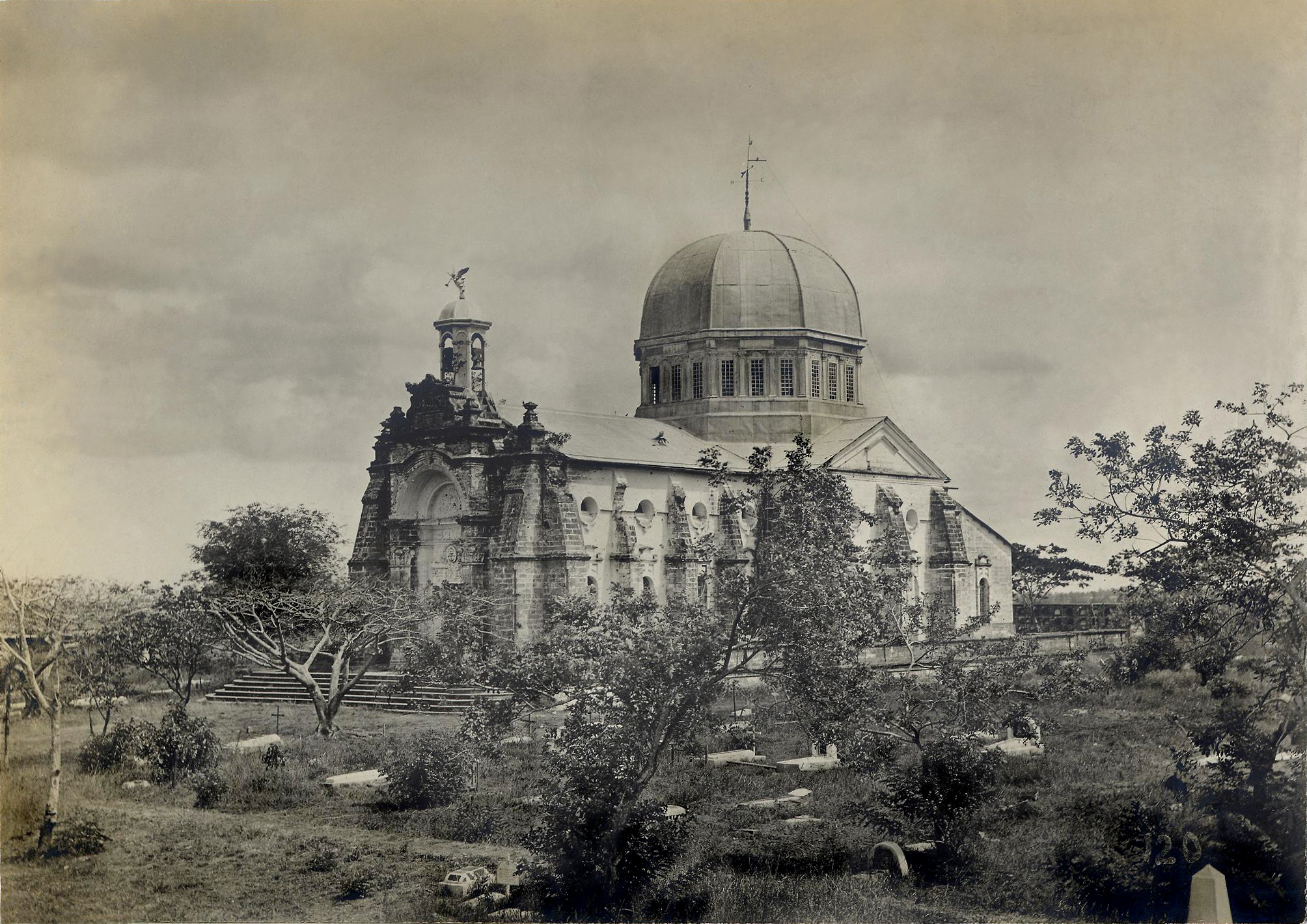
La Loma Cemetery in 1900

The La Loma Cemetery is one of the oldest cemetery in Manila with an area of slightly less than 54 hectares (130 acres). After an earthquake struck Manila in 1863, the Spanish authorities saw the need to find a new cemetery for the city as Paco Cemetery was already running at full capacity. The task was given to Vicente Carranceja, the Inspector General for Public Works. With a budget of P30,000 from the Ayuntamiento he worked with Marcelo Ramirez and began the project on August 3, 1864. The cemetery opened in 1884 and was originally known as Cementerio de Binondo (Binondo Cemetery) as the area was then under the jurisdiction of Santa Cruz during the Spanish Colonial Period.

Spanish officials warned Filipino rebels that once they joined the uprising, they can no longer be buried in Catholic cemeteries on the consecrated ground like La Loma and thus denied of what then was considered a "decent" burial in their time of death.

During the early phases of the Philippine-American War, the cemetery's chapel was the focal point of the Battle of Caloocan. Gen. Arthur MacArthur and his forces occupied the chapel and Blockhouse 2, while Filipino forces under Gen. Antonio Luna were on the northern end of the cemetery.

Campo Santo de La Loma is one of the few sites that escaped ruin during World War II in the 1945 Battle of Manila where most of the city's collection of architecture was destroyed. That leaves it as a crucial piece of the country's historical heritage of architecture. An anti-aircraft mortar launcher can even be seen in the cemetery grounds as well, that still stands today.

== Notable burials ==
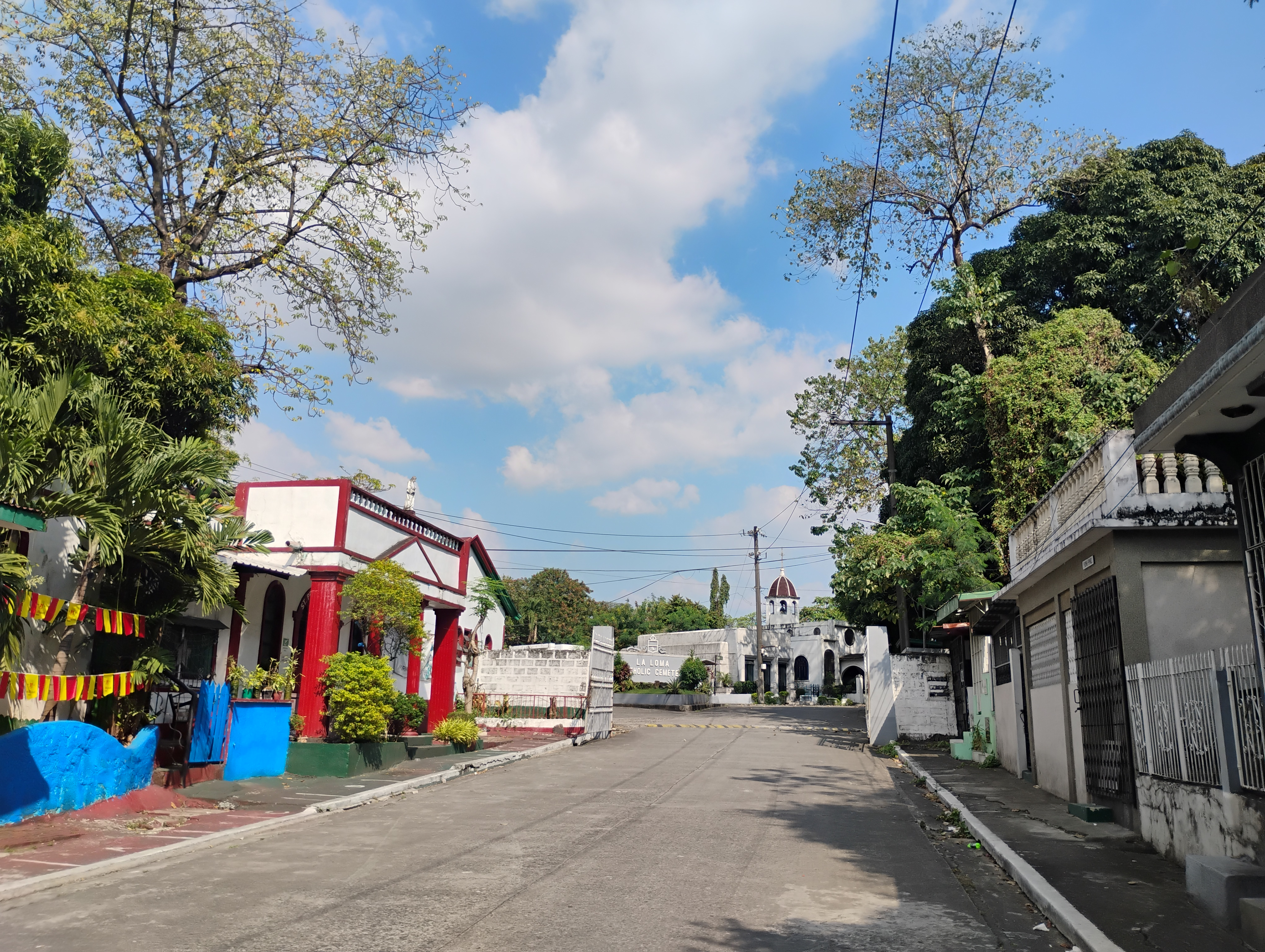
Inside the cemetery

- Jose C. Abriol (1918–2003), Filipino catholic priest known for as the translator of Catholic Bible into Tagalog, as well as the first translation of the Roman Missal to Tagalog. Buried in the Archdiocese of Manila clergy plot.
- Maria Carpena (1886–1915), Filipina stage actress and soprano singer, also 1st Filipina recording artist.
- Anscar Chupungco, O.S.B. (1939–2013), Benedictine monk, priest, liturgist, theologian and educator. Buried in the Benedictines monks plot.
- Carmelino G. Alvendia (1906–1982), a former justice of the Court of Appeals
- Cayetano Arellano (1847–1920), 1st Chief Justice of the Philippine Supreme Court. Arellano is buried in Cayetano Arellano Mausoleum, beside wife Rosa Bernart (died on April 7, 1929), Asunción Arellano de Singian (1881-September 4, 1923) beside the tomb of Gregorio O. Arellano (September 6, 1921 – January 19, 1943) and Josefa Arellano.
- Josefa Llanes Escoda (1898–1945), women's rights advocate and founder of the Girl Scouts of the Philippines; in an unmarked grave.
- Vicente Lava (1894–1947), Communist Leader before and during the Second World War
- Victorino Mapa (1855–1927), 2nd Chief Justice of the Philippine Supreme Court
- Pablo Ocampo (1853–1925), resident commissioner to the US Congress
- Fernando Ocampo (1897–1984), Filipino architect and civil engineer.
- Josephus Stevenot (1888–1943), Founder of the Boy Scouts of the Philippines
- Ignacio Villamor (1863–1933), Delegate of Ilocos Sur at the Malolos Congress (1889); First Filipino President of the University of the Philippines (1915); Associate Justice of the Philippine Supreme Court (1918).
- Tomas Mapua (1888–1965), 1st Registered Architect of the Philippines, founder of Mapua Institute of Technology
- Ricky Belmonte (1947–2001), actor and father of Sheryl Cruz.
- Maria Lorena Barros (1948–1976), founder of the Malayang Kilusan ng Bagong Kababaihan (Free Movement of New Women) (MAKIBAKA)
- Kian Loyd delos Santos (2000–2017), a senior high school student fatally shot by police officers conducting an anti-drug operation in Caloocan.
- Pedro Adigue, Jr. (1943–2003), boxer
- Potenciano Gregorio (1880–1939), composer and musician
Notable internments

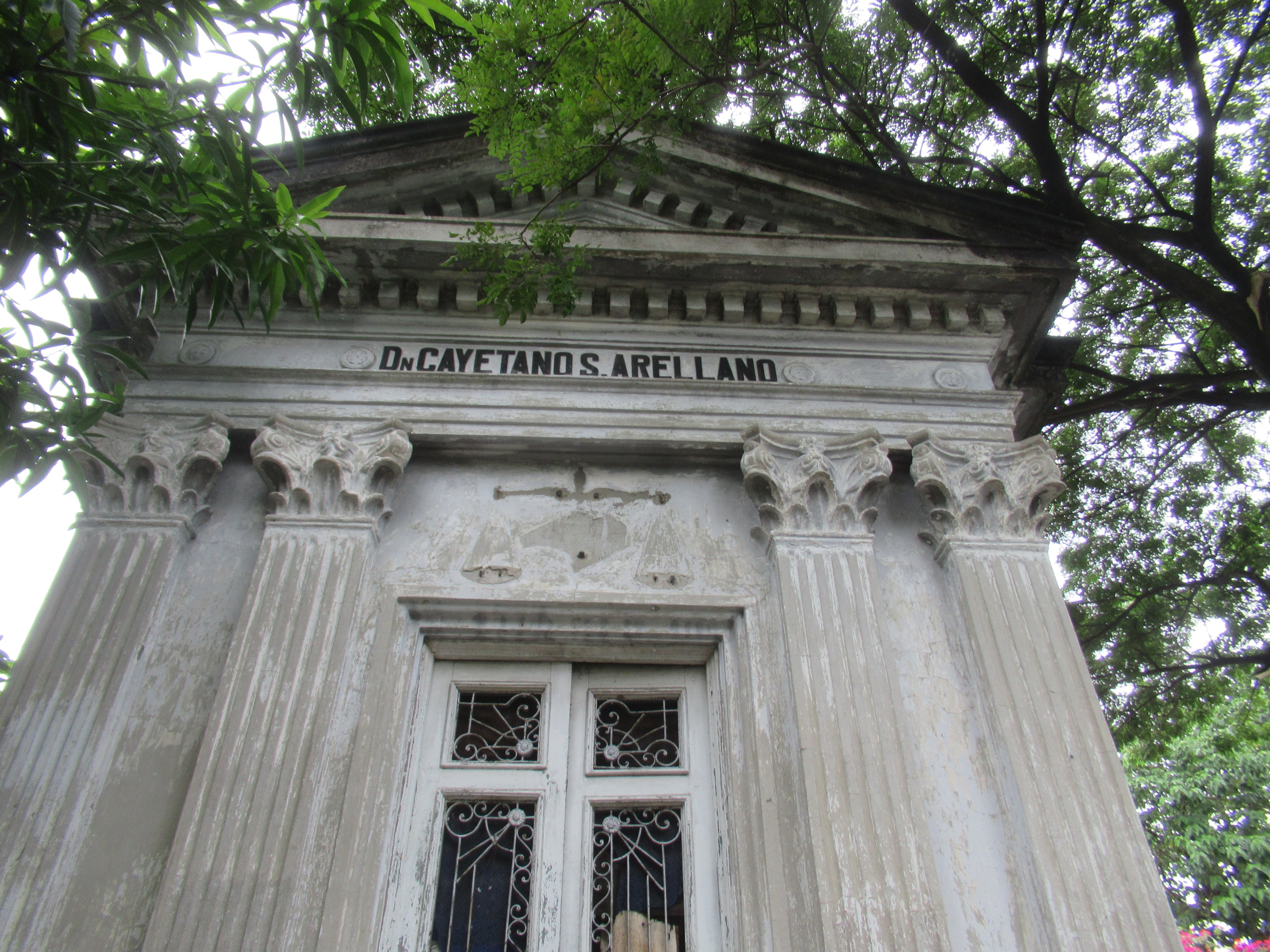
Cayetano Arellano mausoleum

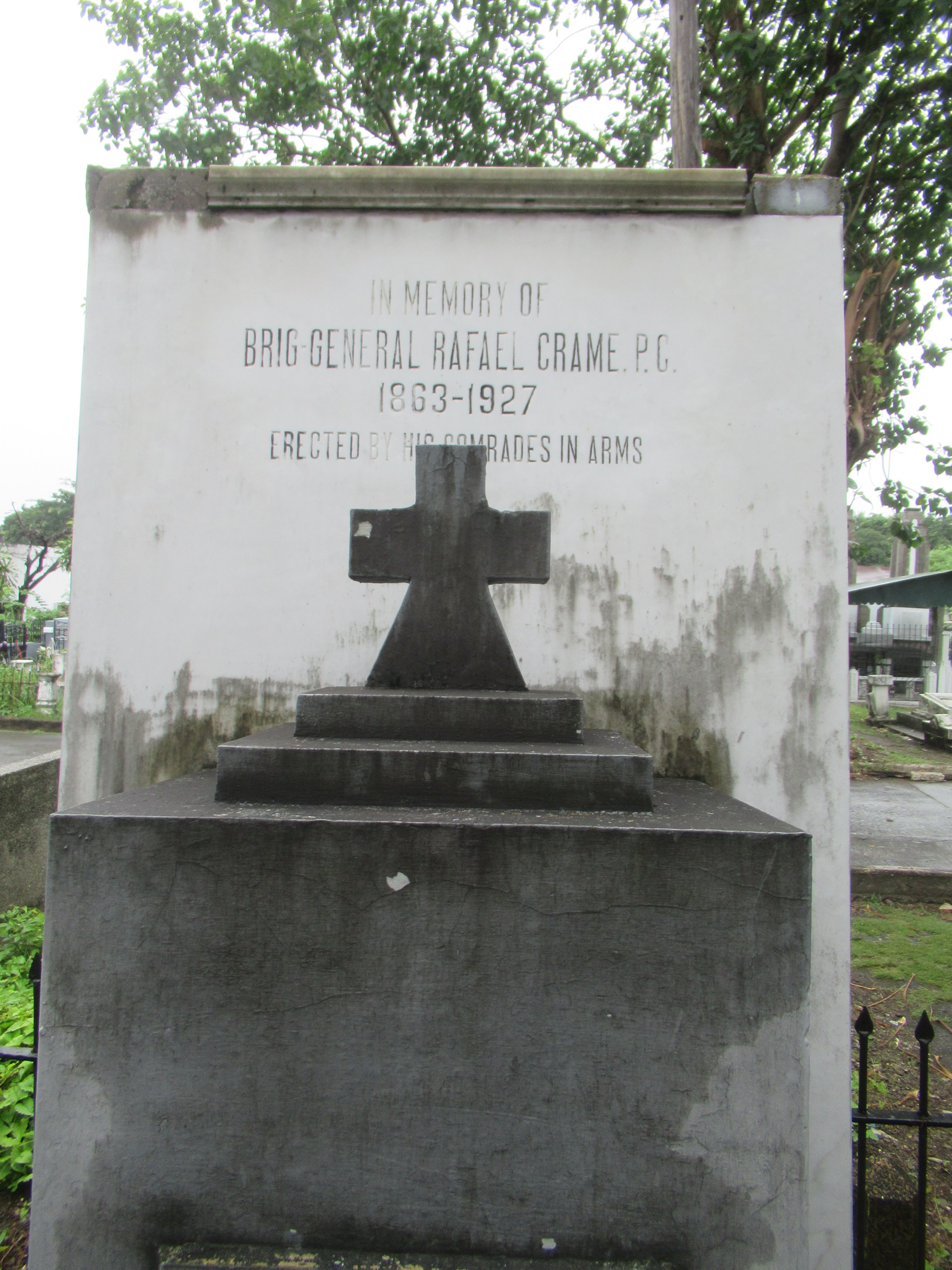
Grave of BGen. Rafael Crame

Tomás Bautista Mapúa mausoleum

Former interments

- Felipe Agoncillo (1859–1941), First Filipino Diplomat, now buried in the Santuario del Santo Cristo Cemetery
- Marcela Agoncillo (1860–1946), wife of Felipe and creator of the national flag of the Philippines, along with their daughter and Delfina Herbosa in Hong Kong, now buried in the Santuario del Santo Cristo Cemetery
- Lorenza Agoncillo (1890–1972), daughter of the principal seamstress of the first and official Philippine flag, now buried in the Santuario del Santo Cristo Cemetery
- BGen. Rafael Crame (1863–1927), 1st Chief of the Philippine Constabulary. Crame was first buried at his Family grave at La Loma Cemetery. Remains have been exhumed on August 7, 2003, and transferred to Libingan ng mga Bayani.
- Librada Avelino (1873–1934), founder of Centro Escolar University. Buried in the Centro Escolar University Catholic Chapel, San Miguel, Manila.
- Brother Hyacinth Gabriel Connon (1911–1978) FSC, onetime president of the De La Salle University. Formerly buried in the De La Salle brothers' plot, his remains and the remains of his fellow De La Salle Brothers were transferred to the Brothers’ Memorial Cloister in the vicinity of De La Salle Lipa in Lipa City.
- De La Salle Martyrs of 1945, members of the De La Salle brothers who died during the Battle of Manila 1945. Formerly buried in the De La Salle brothers' plot, most of their remains were transferred to the Brothers’ Memorial Cloister in the vicinity of De La Salle Lipa in Lipa City. Some were returned to their respective families to be buried in their own family plots.
- Jaime C. de Veyra (1873–1963), former Resident Commissioner of the Philippines. His remains were interred in Basilica of the National Shrine of Our Lady of Mount Carmel Crypt, Quezon City.

== Gallery ==
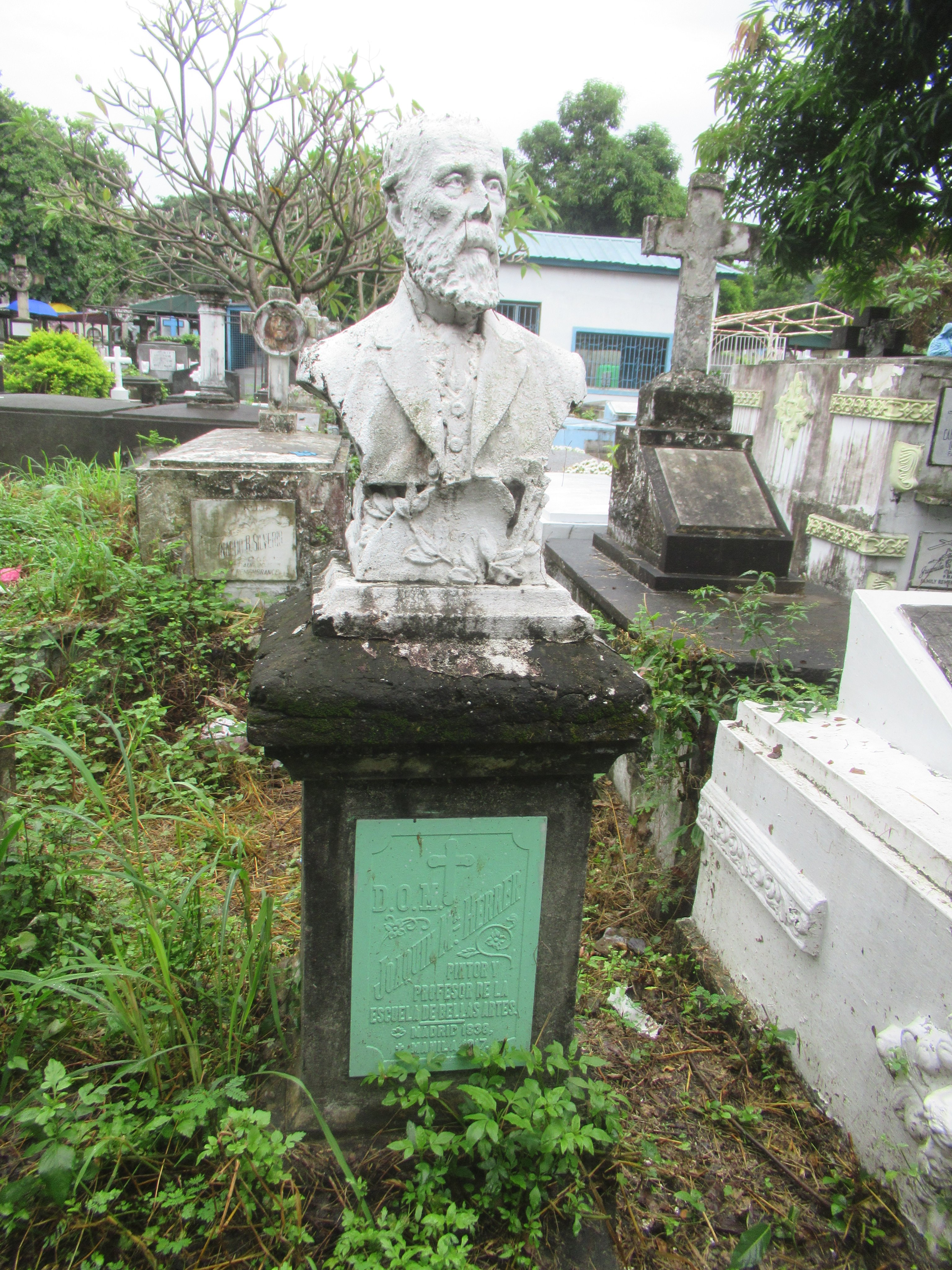
Burial site of Joaquín María Herrer y Rodríguez

Navarro mausoleum

Various old graves and mausolea inside the cemetery

Old La Loma Chapel arch ruins

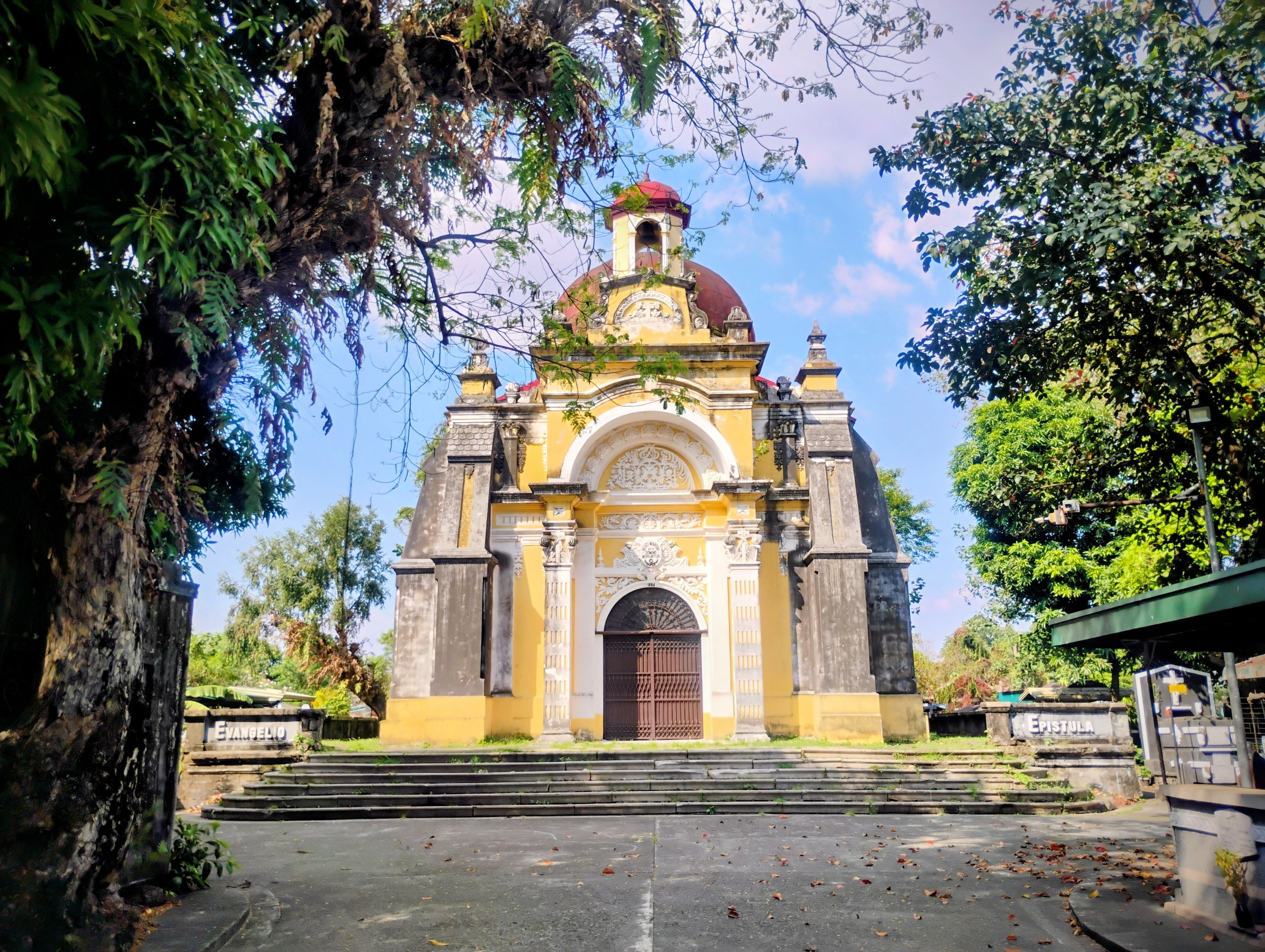
Chapel of St. Pancratius in 2026

== See also ==
- Manila North Cemetery
- Manila Chinese Cemetery
- Libingan ng mga Bayani
- Manila American Cemetery and Memorial
