= Scouting in the Philippines =

The Scout movement in the Philippines is served by

- The Boy Scouts of the Philippines organization, the recognised member of the World Organization of the Scout Movement.
- The Girl Scouts of the Philippines organization, the recognised member of the World Association of Girl Guides and Girl Scouts. These scouting movements contribute to gender equality, camaraderie between scouts, and bringing scouts where they wouldn't have gone.

== International Scouting units and associations ==
- There are two organizations focused on serving children of American families living in the Philippines and elsewhere in eastern Asia and the western Pacific: Boy Scouts of America serviced by the Philippine District of the Far East Council, and USA Girl Scouts Overseas. These councils serve BSA and GSUSA units made up of children of diplomatic, business and military personnel, and international units run under their auspices.
- Traditional Scouts: Rover Scouts Association who serve both male and female 18-above for those who want to be Rover Scouts and follow to the traditional Scouting program as laid out by Baden-Powell during his time. Thus U.S.R. and R.S.A have a Crew in the Philippines. The Baden-Powell Movement of Australia has a branch in Philippines and serve members of the LDS Church.
- In the past, Scouts in Chinese schools registered with the Boy Scouts of China (in Taiwan). With the Filipinization of Chinese schools during the regime of Pres. Marcos, these shifted registration to the BSP and GSP.
- During the existence of the Philippine Refugee Processing Center in Bataan (1980–93), refugee Vietnamese formed unregistered co-ed Huong Dao Viet Nam units of Cubs, Scouts, and Senior Scouts.
- Also at the PRPC, a unit composed of Viet and Lao boys was organised by American supervisors Thomas Rogers and Joseph Reeves Locke and Filipino teachers Lawrence Ong and Samuel Salter. It was registered as Troop 315 of the Boy Scouts of America.
- United States Army centers, such as Fort McKinley has been organizing boy scouts since 1910.
