= Bible translations into the languages of the Philippines =

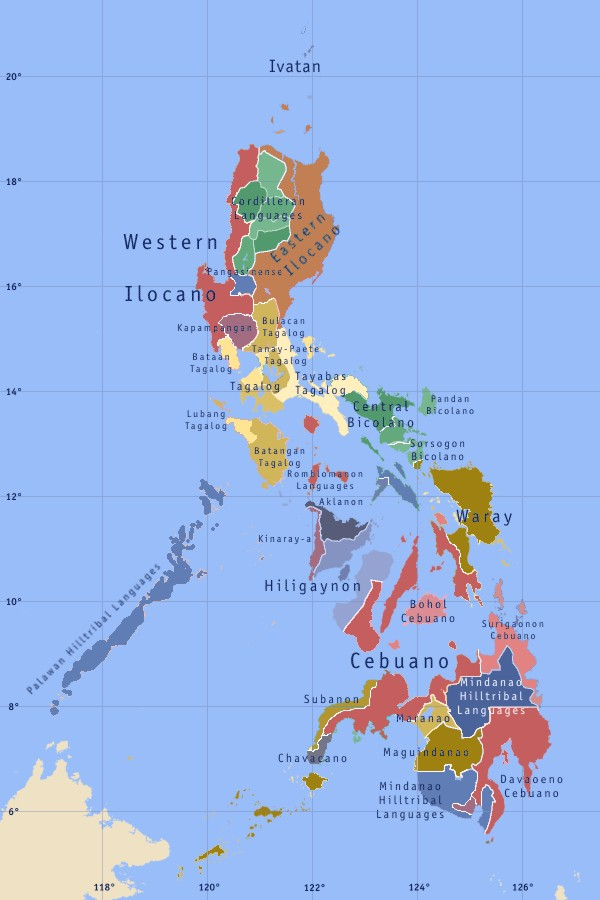
Languages of the Philippines

The Bible has been translated into multiple Philippine languages (with regional languages colloquially referred to as dialects), including Filipino language, based on the Tagalog (the major language), the national language of the Philippines.

== Tagalog ==
Portions of the Bible were first translated by Spanish friars into Philippine languages by the 16th century for the catechisms and prayer materials they produced. The Doctrina Cristiana (1593) was the first book published in the Tagalog baybayin script.

Protestants published Ang Biblia (American Standard Version) in 1905 in Tagalog, based on the Spanish version of the Protestant canon. Most Protestant denominations use the New International Version of the Bible.

However, mainline Protestant denominations in the Philippines tend to prefer the Magandang Balita Biblia (Good News Bible). The Iglesia ni Cristo also uses the same translation. Jehovah's Witnesses use their own translation of the Bible, the Bagong Sanlibutang Salin (New World Translation) which is published in Tagalog, 2000 edition, 2019 revision.

=== Versions ===
- Ang Biblia, 1905, a formal Protestant translation equivalent to the American Standard Version published by the Philippine Bible Society and revised in 2001.
- Ang Banal na Biblia, 1997 NT/2000 OT, a dynamic Catholic translation of the Latin Vulgate with the original Hebrew and Greek texts translated by Msgr. José C. Abriol from 1953 to 1963. It is published by the Daughters of St. Paul and is a semi-study bible.
- Ang Bagong Tipan ng Ating Mananakop at Panginoong Jesucristo, 1952, a Catholic translation of the New Testament from the Latin Vulgate translated by Fr. Juan T. Trinidad and published by Sacred Hearts Publication.
- Ang Salita ng Buhay and Ang Buhay na Salita, twin translations of the New Testament translated by Dr. Faustino C. Ruivivar. Ang Salita ng Buhay was produced by Living Bibles International in 1977 while Ang Buhay na Salita was produced by Biblica in 2010.
- Ang Biblia - New Pilipino Version, 1986, a Protestant translation equivalent to the New International Version produced by Manila International Bible Society (now Biblica).
- Ang Bagong Tipan: Salin sa Pagbabawi, 1991, Filipino translation of the New Testament of The Recovery Version of the Bible by Witness Lee. The translation was made possible by The Editorial Section of Living Stream Ministry.
- Ang Salita ng Diyos, 1998, a translation of the New Testament produced by Bibles International. Full text
- Ang Salita ng Diyos para sa mga Pilipino, 2003, a translation of the New Testament produced by OMF Literature, Inc.
- Salita ng Diyos para sa Pilipinas, 1993, 2022, a Tagalog translation of the New Testament based mainly from the King James Bible and the Textus Receptus produced by Bearing Precious Seed Ministries. Their editions available in Tagalog-only format, and a parallel edition with the English King James Bible.
- Ang Banal na Kasulatan ng Dios or Tinapay ng Buhay Version, 2023, a Tagalog revision of the Ang Biblia New Testament to conform and match the readings of the King James Bible. This work was attributed to a certain MG Bueno. Full text
- Magandang Balita Biblia or Tagalog Popular Version, 1973 NT/1980 OT, a dynamic ecumenical Bible equivalent to the Good News Bible published by the Philippine Bible Society. The 1980 edition is still used in the Tagalog liturgy of the Catholic Church. It is revised in 2005, 2012 (New Testament only) and 2018 (Old Testament only). The 2018 revision is only available as a Catholic edition (no Protestant edition) published as May They Be One Plus(+) Catholic Edition and it is the first Filipino Bible printed in one-year Bible format. Full text
- Ang Biblia ng Sambayanang Pilipino, 1990, a dynamic Catholic translation equivalent to the Christian Community Bible published by Claretians and is a semi-study bible. Full text
- Ang Salita ng Dios, 2010, 2015, a dynamic Protestant translation equivalent to the New International Version produced by Biblica.
- Ang Bibliyang Tagalog King James Bible, 2014, a translation of the 14 epistles of Paul by blogger "tagahabagatan" of Pliroma Revelation Bible Ministry translated directly from the King James Version.
- Greek-Tagalog Interlinear, 2015, a formal ecumenical translation of the New Testament interlined with Greek text published by the Philippine Bible Society. It is side-by-side with the Ang Biblia 2001 as its guide text.
- Filipino King James Bible, 2016, 2017, a Baptist translation of the New Testament, Psalms and Proverbs published by Send the Light Ministries translated directly from the King James Version using English-Filipino/Tagalog (and vice versa) dictionaries.
- Tagalog Unlocked Literal Bible and Tagalog Unlocked Dynamic Bible, 2017, twin Protestant public domain translations by Door43.
- Tagalog Unbound Bible, a public domain translation of John and James.
- Ang Bible: Pinoy Version, 2018, a dynamic ecumenical New Testament translation written in contemporary Filipino language or Taglish published by the Philippine Bible Society. It caters for millennial Filipino youths and it is the first Filipino bible printed in journalling bible format. While written in Taglish, the vocabulary is intermediate between colloquial and formal, as the vocabulary excludes slangs to cater for all groups of millennial youths.
- Filipino Standard Version, 2009, 2018, a dynamic translation of the New Testament, Psalms and Proverbs published by the Philippine Bible Society. It is a very unpopular translation compared to the other two 2018 publications of Philippine Bible Society (MTBO+ MBB and NT:PV). Full text
- Ang Malayang Biblia New Testament, a modern Filipino translation based mainly on the Textus Receptus. The text is licensed under Creative Commons Attribution-ShareAlike 4.0. Full text
- Bagong Sanlibutang Salin ng Banal na Kasulatan, 2000, 2019, 2020 (for Study Edition), a Jehovah's Witnesses translation equivalent to the New World Translation of the Holy Scriptures. It is produced by Watch Tower Bible and Tract Society of Pennsylvania and published by Watchtower Bible and Tract Society of New York, Inc. Full text (for Study Edition: Full text)

== Regional languages ==
The Philippine Bible Society has translated the Bible into other major Philippine languages, namely: Ilocano, Pangasinan, Kapampangan, Bicolano, Hiligaynon, Waray, Zamboangueño and Cebuano. Each of these languages has at least two Bible versions published by the society: one formal equivalence translation (mainly used among conservative Protestants), and one dynamic equivalence translation (available with or without the deuterocanonical books).

In addition to the Tagalog translation of Jose Abriol, the Catholic Church, through the Daughters of St. Paul, publishes Catholic Bibles in Kapampangan, Bicolano, and Waray. Moreover, derivative translations of the Christian Community Bible published by the Claretians are also available in Hiligaynon (Biblia sang Katilingban sang mga Kristiano) and Cebuano (Biblia sa Kristohanong Katilingban).

The Jehovah's Witnesses also translate their Bible, the New World Translation of the Holy Scriptures, into several regional languages such as Cebuano (2000 edition, 2019 revision); Hiligaynon (2007, 2014 edition); Iloko (2000 edition, 2018 revision); Pangasinan (2009, 2015 edition); Bicol (2016 edition); and Waray-Waray (2012, 2019 edition).

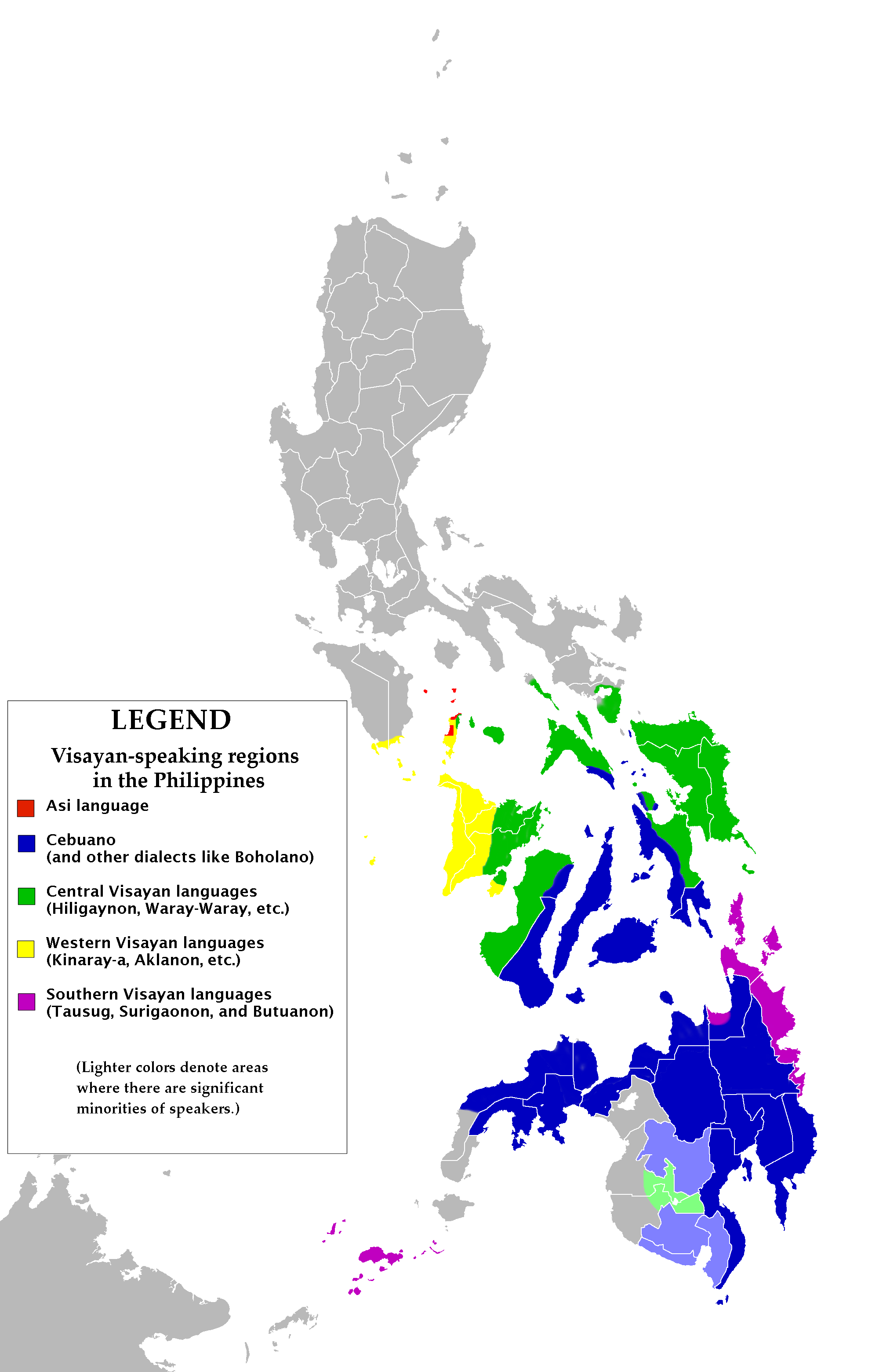
Regions in the Philippines where Visayan languages are predominantly spoken.

Other languages of the Philippines:

- Asi – spoken in towns on Tablas Island as well as the islands of Banton, Simara, and Maestro de Campo in Romblon province. It is known officially as Bantoanon language.
- Cebuano – includes Boholano, Leytehanon, Mindanao Cebuano and Mindanao Visayan dialects. - New World Translation; 2000 edition, 2019 revision.
- Surigaonon (including Jaun-Jaun). May be closest to Cebuano.
- Central Visayan – includes:
  - Waray - two modern Bible translations; New World Translation; 2012, 2019 edition.
  - Romblomanon which includes Sibuyan various dialects of Cajidiocanon, San Fernando-Azagra Sibujanon and the Magdiwang-Espana Sibuyanon variety, Ati, Capiznon, Masbatenyo, Porohanon, the Bisakol languages of Sorsogon and Northern Samar, and others.
- Western Visayan – includes:
  - Hiligaynon - New World Translation; 2007, 2014 edition.
  - Kinaray-a (the major language of Antique),
  - Aklan languages (Aklanon, Malaynon),
  - Onhan or Loocnon (Tablas)- Eldon Leano Talamisan, 1999 (New Testament), Philippines, into the Onhan language or Bisaya-Inunhan
  - Caluyanon,
  - Cuyonon,
  - Ratagnon,
  - and others.
- Tausug – spoken in Jolo, Sulu; Palawan; Basilan; Tawi-Tawi; and Zamboanga City and environs. Also spoken in Indonesia (Kalimantan), and Malaysia (Sabah). It has been suggested to be more closely related to the Mansakan languages than to Visayan.
