= Philippine Islands Council (Boy Scouts of America) =

Local council of Scouting America

Philippine Islands Council (545)
- Owner: Boy Scouts of America
- Headquarters: Manila, Philippines
- Country: United States
- Founded: 1938

The Philippine Council was founded in 1923 by the Rotary Club of Manila to organize Scouting activities in the Philippines. The founding/charter members were all prominent figures in the commercial, political, social, and cultural scene of Manila. Most held simultaneous memberships in a number of organizations, such as the YMCA, the American Chamber of Commerce of the Philippine Islands, the Masons, the Elks, the Army and Navy Club, etc. The Council was disbanded when the Boy Scouts of the Philippines was inaugurated in 1938.

== Historical highlights ==
In 1927, the BSA's Boys' Life magazine, reported:

Most interesting reports are received of the growth of Scouting which was recently organized in the Philippine Islands. There are 112 Troops with about 2,400 registered Scouts. The Scout Executives who help the Movement in the Philippines, were sent by the Boy Scouts of America, and Mr. A. S. Macfarlane, who is in charge, has sent some very interesting evidence of the real understanding with which the Philippine boy takes the Scout Oath and Law and does his Daily Good Turn. ... We are publishing on page 23 a photograph of the boys in the Leper Hospital, taking the Scout Oath. These boys are extremely poor and Mr. Macfarlane suggests that because it is impossible for these boys to earn any money toward their uniforms, it would be fine if some of our Troops, as well as individual scouts, would send old uniforms which could be used by members of this Troop. Parcels should be addressed to the Boy Scouts of America, Supply Dept., 121 West 19th Street, New York, N. Y. Please be sure to mark your parcels "For Philippine Scouts."

In 1931, Boys' Life magazine, reported:

that three Eagle Scouts of the Philippine Islands Council were among the 52 BSA Eagle Scout recipients of the Harmon Foundation Scholarship:

- Antonio F. Garcia, 18, of 42 San Marcelino Street, Manila (Troop 19, Manila)
- Leonardo Osorio Jr., 18, of De La Salle College, Manila (Troop 20, Manila)
- Moises P. Rulloda, 19, of 141 Arquiza Street, Ermita, Manila (Troop 53, Manila)

In 1932, The heroism of Scout William Warmsley of Tuguegaráo in 1931 was mentioned by BSA Chief Scout Executive James West inBoys' Life. Also in the same year, three Scouts of the Philippine Council were awarded the Gold Medal for saving life, the BSA Shanghai District was placed under the jurisdiction of the Philippine Council, and the award of the Silver Buffalo was given to Dwight Filley Davis for active "support of Scouting in the Philippines while Governor General of the Islands", 1929–32.

In 1933, the Philippine Council delegation of 6 Scouts and 1 Scouter joined the Boy Scouts of America contingent to the 4th World Scout Jamboree in Gödöllő, Hungary. The Council also qualified for the President Roosevelt Award.

In 1934, Arthur Frederick Fischer, Director of the Bureau of Forestry, issued Special Order No. 52, March 27, 1934, directing Forestry staff to prepare a Boy Scout forestry handbook. In the same year, the Rover scheme was introduced.

In 1935, the first National Jamboree of the BSA, scheduled for 21–30 August in Washington, D.C., was cancelled due to a polio outbreak. The Philippine Council contingent of 32 boys and 3 men toured the US making presentations of Philippine culture. James West, in words and photographs, reported on the tour and exhibitions by the Philippine Council contingent.

In 1936, the Boy Scouts of the Philippines organization was founded through the efforts of Philippine Council President Josephus Stevenot, supported by the vital roles played by Tomás Confesór and Manuel L. Quezon. Stevenot, the actual Founder, performed the actual organizational work of establishing the BSP. He prepared the draft document for the BSP's establishment and lobbied the proposal at the National Assembly.

In 1937, the Philippine Council officials met on 11 October and resolved to transfer the Council's jurisdiction, authority, and assets to the Boy Scouts of the Philippines organization. The Council turned over its assets and its jurisdiction for Filipino boys to the Boy Scouts of the Philippines on 31 December.
