= Magandang Balita Biblia =

Filipino translation of the Bible

- Full name: Magandang Balita Biblia
- Abbreviation: MBB
- Complete Bible published: 1973
- Textual basis: OT: Biblia Hebraica (Kittel), Alfred Rahlfs' edition of the Septuagint (deuterocanonical); NT: Novum Testamentum Graece
- Publisher: Philippine Bible Society
- Genesis 1:1–3 Nang pasimula ay nilikha ng Diyos ang langit at ang lupa; ang lupa ay walang hugis o anyo. Dilim ang bumabalot sa kalaliman at kumikilos ang Espiritu ng Diyos sa ibabaw ng tubig. Sinabi ng Diyos: “Magkaroon ng liwanag!” At nagkaroon nga. John 3:16 Sapagkat gayon na lamang ang pag-ibig ng Diyos sa sangkatauhan, kaya't ibinigay niya ang kanyang kaisa-isang Anak, upang ang sinumang sumampalataya sa kanya ay hindi mapahamak, kundi magkaroon ng buhay na walang hanggan.

The Magandang Balita Biblia (lit. 'Good News Bible') is a translation of the Bible in the Tagalog language, first published by the Philippine Bible Society in 1973. It follows the tradition of the Good News Bible; however, it is not a direct translation but rather only a parallel translation of it.

== Sources and bases ==
According to the Philippine Bible Society, the translators used the Masoretic Text, particularly the third edition of Biblia Hebraica edited by Rudolf Kittel (published in 1937), as the main basis of their Old Testament. However, when there was no satisfactory text that could be used as a basis, the PBS opted to use any of the oldest versions available. These versions are those written in Greek, Syriac or Latin. However, when there still was no other version available, the committee opted to use a modern translation that they deemed suitable.

For the Deuterocanonical Books, the translators used the Septuagint, particularly the edition of Alfred Rahlfs (published in 1949). However, for comparative purposes, the PBS used the first critical edition of the Biblia Sacra prepared by Robert Weber (published in 1969).

When it comes to the New Testament, the translators used the third edition of the United Bible Societies Greek New Testament (UBS3, published in 1975), save for some parts that were based on a variant reading supported by one or more Greek manuscripts.

== See also ==
- Bible translations into the languages of the Philippines
