= Josephus Stevenot =

Josephus H. Stevenot
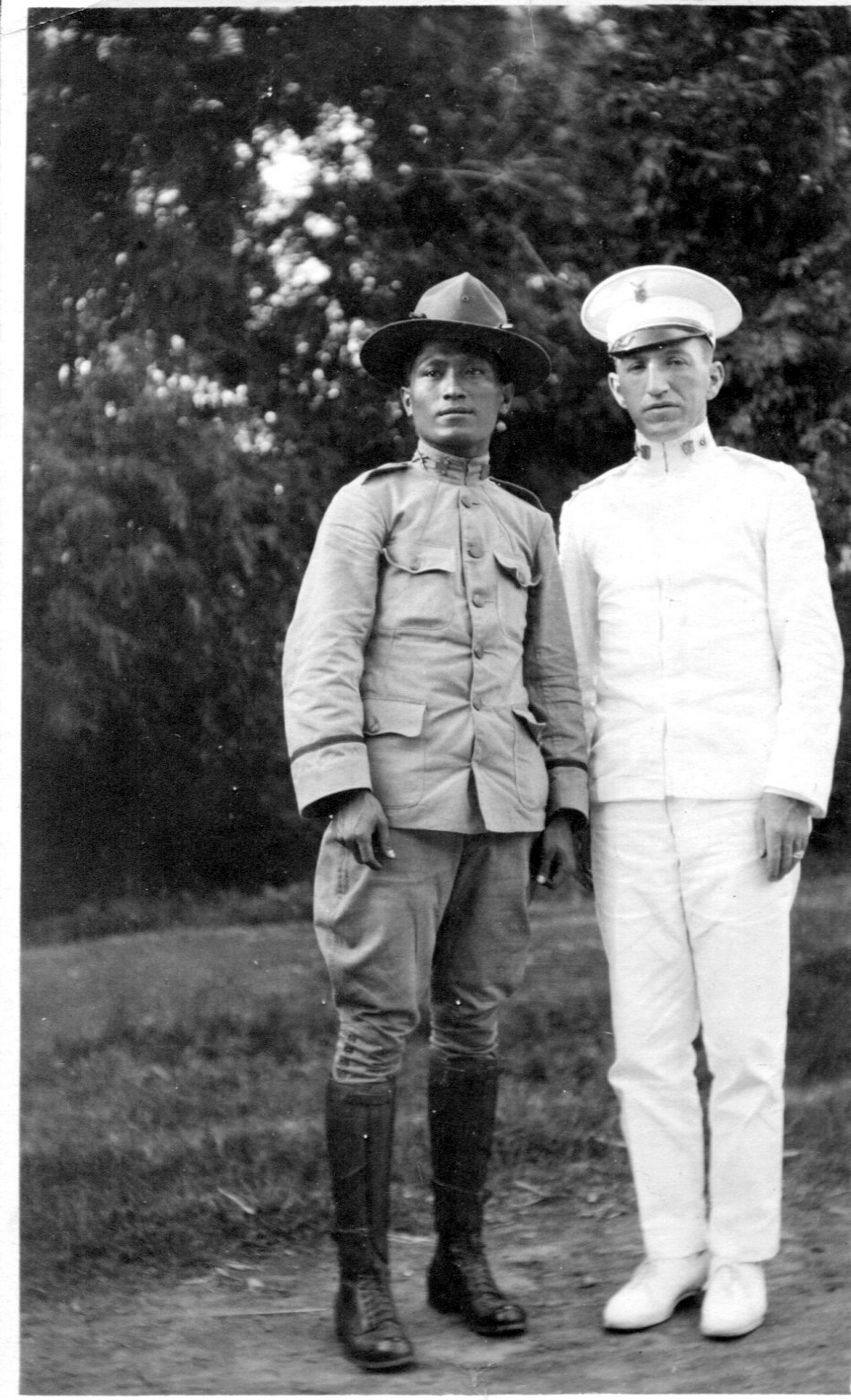
- Lt. Miguél Aguinaldo (Left) and Maj. Josephus Stevenot (Right) on the road to Cavite, 1917
- Born: Josephus Emile Hamilton Stevenot; December 23, 1888; Melones, California, United States
- Died: June 8, 1943 (aged 54); New Hebrides
- Resting place: La Loma Cemetery, Philippines
- Other name: Joe
- Known for: Charter member of the BSP; PLDT Co-Founder
- Spouse: Elma Lovisa Kimball Stevenot
- Parent(s): Emile Knoepffler Stevenot (father); Sarah Elisabeth Hamilton Stephens Stevenot (mother)

Josephus Hamilton Stevenot (December 23, 1888 – June 8, 1943) was an American entrepreneur and U.S. Army officer in the Philippines with many accomplishments, but today mostly remembered in the Boy Scouts of the Philippines as a co-founder.

== Background and career ==
Josephus Emile Hamilton "Joe" Stevenot was born in Melones, California to Emile Knoepffler Stevenot (1846–1906) and Sarah Elisabeth Hamilton Stephens Stevenot (1855–1928). Emile Knoepffler Stevenot was born in Alsace-Lorraine, trained as a mining engineer, and migrated to the USA to join his father Jean Dieudonne Gabriel Knoepffler Stevenot (1813–1885), a California miner.

Joe had eight siblings. Joe and his three brothers, Fred, Archibald, and Casimir, were involved in various enterprises, and set up their Stevenot Corporation which had mining interests in California and the Philippines. Casimir also founded the California Philippine Corporation for import and export. Joe based himself in the Philippines to attend to their business concerns in the islands.

Josephus Stevenot served as Director of the Philippine Trust Company, President and General Manager of the Philippine Long Distance Telephone Company (PLDT), Director of the Bank of the Philippine Islands (BPI), Director of Philippine Milling Company, Director of Philippine Realty Corporation, and Director of Fidelity & Surety Company.

At the same time, Stevenot was involved in military matters as a major in the active reserves. An Army pilot, he was appointed to the command of the aviation unit of the Philippine National Guard (which had been planned to be involved in World War I but never saw action). Stevenot recruited his flying instructor Alfred John Croft (1887–1970), and together they established the Curtiss School of Aviation (called the Curtiss Flying School, after the original Curtiss Flying School) in Camp Claudio, Parañaque, Rizal, where they trained the first 25 Filipino pilots. They subsequently organised an air show by their students, held on 21 June 1921.

In June 1941, in Washington DC with Secretary of War Henry Lewis Stimson, Stevenot urged closer cooperation between Philippine Army Field Marshall Douglas MacArthur and U.S. Army Philippine Department Commander Maj. Gen. George Grunert.

As portents of war became more pronounced, Stevenot became more active in intelligence work. It was while working for Allied intelligence in the South West Pacific Area in World War II that Col. Stevenot died in a plane crash in Vanuatu. After an initial burial, his remains were later transferred to La Loma Cemetery, allegedly by request of the Boy Scouts of the Philippines.

== Scouting involvement ==
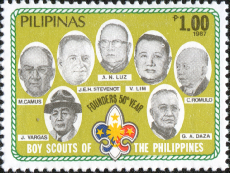
Stevenot (third from the left) Founders of the Boy Scouts of the Philippines. Stamp for National Boy Scout Movement 50th Anniversary, 28 Oct 1987.

Stevenot's involvement in Scouting in the Philippines started with the Boy Scouts of America Philippine Islands Council No. 545, as Chairman of the Finance Committee. The Council was financially unstable and he was invited by West Pointer Gen. Vicente Lim, a Boy Scouting supporter. The Council improved considerably under Stevenot's guidance, and in 1934 he was elected the last President of the BSA Philippine Islands Council No. 545.

With the imminent granting of independence to the Philippines by the United States in 1946, Stevenot worked for the establishment of a Philippine Boy Scout organization. "Almost single-handed, President Stevenot worked for the gradual grant of autonomy to our Boy Scout Organization,..." (— Scouting for Filipino Boys, page 11). He performed the paper work, obtained the support of six prominent national personalities to lend their names as incorporators, and lobbied the Philippine National Assembly for a legal charter, imitating the Congressional charter obtained by the Boy Scouts of America from the United States Congress. His efforts resulted in a legislative bill sponsored by Assemblyman Tomás Valenzuela Confesór (1891–1951) and signed into law as Commonwealth Act 111 by Pres. Manuel L. Quezon on October 31, 1936. As founder of the Boy Scouts of the Philippines, Stevenot became both the first President (the corporate head of the organization) and the first Chief Scout (patterned after Baron Baden-Powell of Gilwell and Ernest Thompson Seton, to act as the focus of the youth's inspiration which had fueled the entire Scout Movement globally).

In 1937, in his letter "To the People of the Philippine Islands," dated October 28, 1937, Theodore Roosevelt Jr. commended Stevenot: "In Major Stevenot you have an exceptionally able and public spirited man."

In 1939, Stevenot supported the establishment of a Girl Scout organization by sending Josefa Llanes Escoda to the United States and Britain for training. Upon Escoda's return to the Philippines, he assisted her in setting up the Girl Scouts of the Philippines.

In 1941, by request of the BSP, the BSA recognized Stevenot's service to youth with the award of the Silver Buffalo.

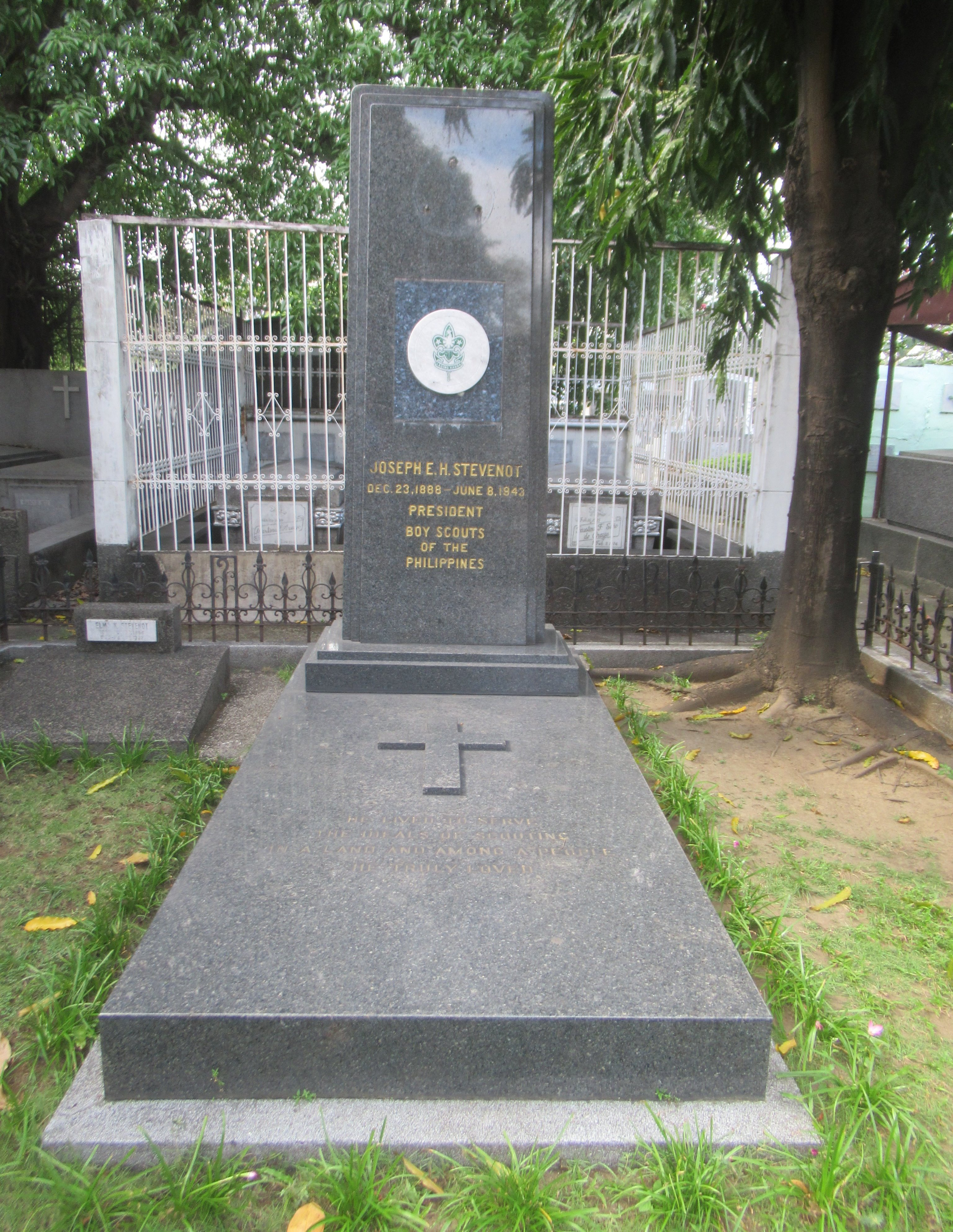
Stevenot's grave at La Loma Cemetery.

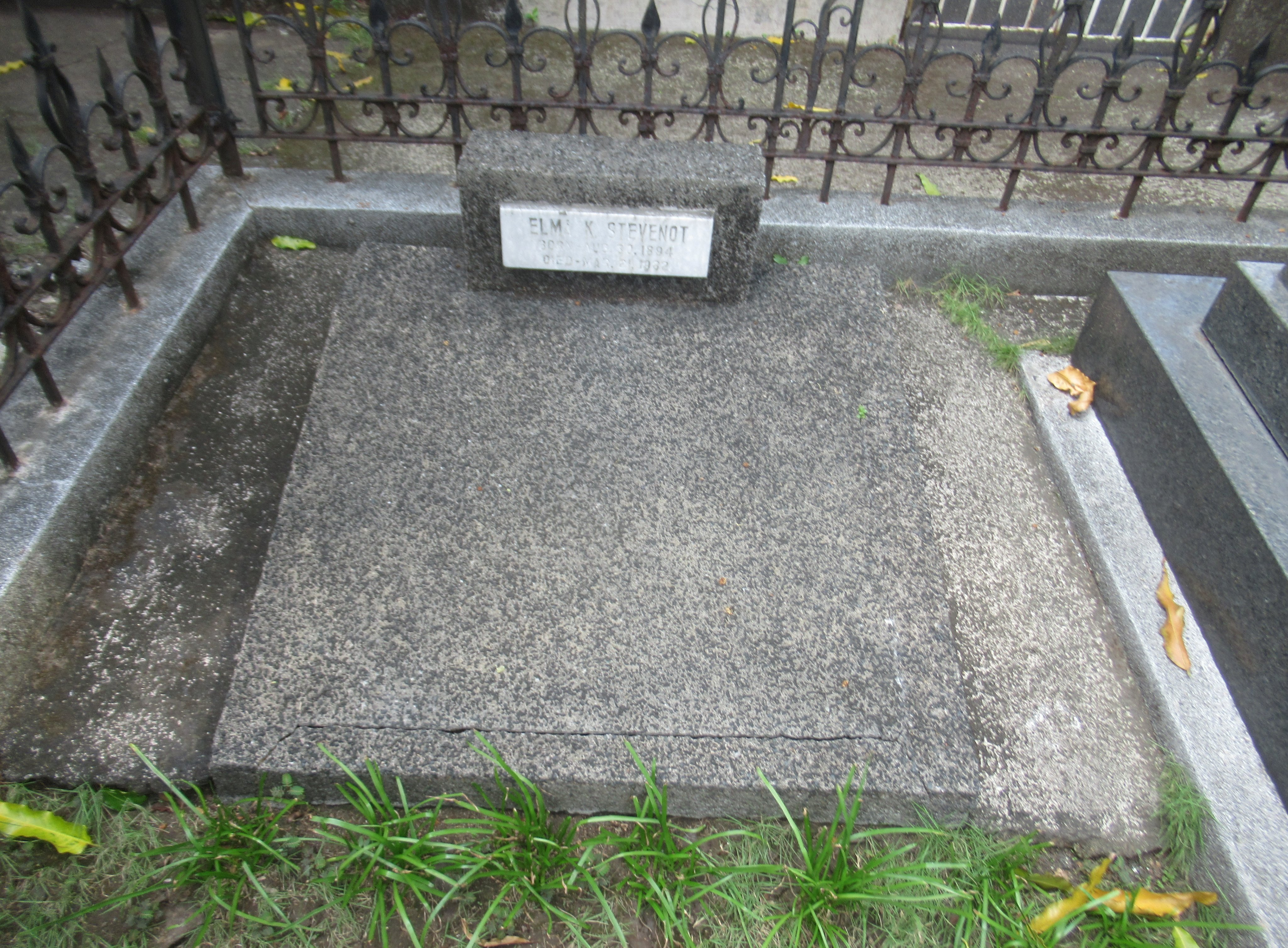
Elma Lovisa Kimball Stevenot's grave at La Loma Cemetery.

== Death ==
Stevenot died in 1943 at just 54. He was buried in New Caledonia but was later exhumed by the US Army and his friend fellow Boy Scouts of the Philippines charter member Don Gabriel Daza, and his remains were later buried with full Scouting honours at La Loma Cemetery in the Philippines. Forty years later, Stevenot's wife passed in California and one of Stevenot's daughters and Daza brought the ashes to the Philippines to be buried along with her husband.

== The Stevenot Family Tree ==
The nine offspring, and some descendants, of Emile and Sarah Stevenot included:

- Marie Felice Stevenot Gericke (1873–1967) + James Robert Gericke (1865–1931)
- Margaret Stevenot (1875–1905)
- Ferdinand Gabriel Stevenot (1877–1963) + Evelyn Rose Stevenot (1882-1967)

Ferdinand Gabriel Stevenot (1877–1963) + Adelaide Julia DeLuca Stevenot (1876–1968)

- Natalie Stevenot Hildebrand (1879–1961)
- Leona Stevenot Christianson (1881–1963)
- Archibald Douglas Stevenot (1882–1968) + Adeline A. Airola Stevenot (1897–1916)

Archibald Douglas Stevenot (1882–1968) + Katherine Carmelita Costa Stevenot (1886–1941)
Archibald Douglas Stevenot (1882–1968) + Rose Costa Stevenot (1876–1969)

- Alice Florence Stevenot (1885–1889)
- Josephus Emile Hamilton Stevenot (1888–1943) + Elma Lovisa Kimball Stevenot (1894–1982)

- Myra Eugenie Stevenot Cabella (1928–2007) + Louis George Cabella

- Joelle Cabella

- Trina Seiber

Myra Eugenie Stevenot Taylor (1928–2007) + Dory Taylor

- Shirley Joanne Stevenot Lawder (1931–2006) + J. William Lawder (1929–2004)

- Kathryn Marie Lawder (1954– )
- Kim Lawder Triller
- Deborah Lawder Sullivan
- William Lawder

- Casimir Michael Stevenot (1892–1968) + Mary Agnes O'Connor Stevenot (1894–1966)

== Standard sources ==
The following five books are the major sources for the history of Boy Scouting in the Philippines. These present a standard, almost uniform, write-up about Stevenot. Virtually all Philippine Boy Scouting websites and web pages present only a rewrite of information from these works:

- Scouting for Filipino Boys, Volume 1, Manila: Boy Scouts of the Philippines, 1949.
- Diamond Jubilee Yearbook, Manila: Boy Scouts of the Philippines, 1996, one edition, one printing.
- Boy Scout Book, Volume 1, Manila: Boy Scouts of the Philippines, several editions; last edition 1972.
- On My Honor: Stories of Scouts in Action, Manila: Boy Scouts of the Philippines, one 1st-edition printing; one 2nd (corrected) edition printing.
- Good Morning!, Manila: Boy Scouts of the Philippines, 2012, one edition, one printing.

== See also ==
- Girl Scouts of the Philippines
