= Jose C. Abriol =

Filipino Catholic priest (1918–2003)

The Reverend Monsignor José C. Abriol P.A.

Personal life
- Born: February 14, 1918 Manila, Philippines
- Died: July 6, 2003 (aged 85)
- Resting place: La Loma Cemetery
- Notable work(s): Ang Banal na Biblia (The Holy Bible, in Filipino)

Religious life
- Religion: Roman Catholic
- Profession: Priest, Bible translator
- Ordination: May 14, 1942

José C. Abriol (February 4, 1918 – July 6, 2003) was a Filipino priest, linguist, and prelate of the Catholic Church. He was the first to translate the Catholic Bible into Tagalog, one of several major Philippine languages.

== Biography ==
Abriol was ordained to the priesthood on May 14, 1942. He translated the Holy Bible from the original Hebrew and Greek. Apart from this, he also became rector of Manila Cathedral from 1962 to 1975, and at the same time was the chancellor of the Archdiocese of Manila. He was fluent in nine languages, namely Spanish, Latin, Greek, Hebrew, Italian, English, German, and Filipino (Tagalog). He served as a priest for sixty years and died at the age of 85. He is regarded as one of the "great intellectuals of the Philippine Church and the world."

== As a translator ==
As a priest who yearned to propagate the Roman Catholic faith in the Philippines, Abriol wrote and translated hundreds of books and novenas into the Filipino language. Among his works are the very first translation of the complete books of the Catholic Bible into Tagalog (also known as Pilipino), literature on the Catechism, the Order of Mass and the rest of the Roman Missal, and the Lectionary. He translated the Holy Bible from the original Hebrew and Greek while serving as rector of the Cathedral of Manila, a period encompassing ten years of his life. From 1953 to 1963, he allotted five hours a day for this task. Among the 69 to 70 books he authored – excluding his other translation works – were lives of saints, prayers to the Virgin Mary, Sunday missals, the Via Crucis (Way of the Cross), and the Siete Palabras (Seven Last Words of Christ). Before 2000, he was also able to finish his translation of Pope John Paul II's encyclical Fides et Ratio (Faith and Reason), which became Pananampalataya at Katwiran in Tagalog.

== Priesthood ==
Apart from being rector of the Manila Cathedral and chancellor for the Archdiocese of Manila from 1962 to 1975, Abriol served as parish priest for the parishes of St. Michael the Archangel at Jala-Jala, Rizal (1947–1951), of San Rafael, Balut, Tondo in Manila (1951–1962), and of the Minor Basilica of the Black Nazarene at Quiapo, Manila (1976–1993). He was also a member of the Manila Archdiocesan Commission for the Conservation of the Patrimony of the Art and History of the Church, from 1993 through 1999. He was the Vicar General for the Archdiocese of Manila for 38 years from 1965 to July 2003. He was also the first director of Manila's Archdiocese Museum which houses his own "personal collections and church treasures" formerly safeguarded inside a bank vault.

While serving as a parish priest at the Basilica of the Black Nazarene in Quiapo, Manila, Abriol established the St. Peter’s Men Society, a group that "defended Catholicism in Plaza Miranda against anti-Catholics and employed radio technology to communicate and explain the Biblical foundation of the Catholic faith" to the Filipino people. Abriol did not retire from the priesthood, nor from his translation and research activities, when he reached the mandatory age of 75. He died of cardiac arrest at the Cardinal Santos Memorial Hospital on July 6, 2003. His wake was held at the Arzobispado de Manila (the Archbishopric of Manila) inside Intramuros, while the requiem mass was held on July 10, 2003, at the Manila Cathedral, with Cardinal Jaime Sin as the main celebrant of the Mass. Abriol was the friend and confessor of Cardinal Sin. He was interred in the burial plot of the Archdiocese of Manila in La Loma Cemetery.

== Awards and recognitions ==
=== In the Philippines ===
In the Philippines, Abriol received the Gawad Bukas Palad (literally, the "Open Palm [ of the hand ] Award") in 1999 from the Ateneo de Manila University, the Outstanding Manilan Award in 2000 from the government of the City of Manila, and the Gawad ng Pagkilala (or "Recognition Award") in 2000 from the Commission on the Filipino Language (formerly known as the National Language Institute) of the Philippines for the "propagation and development of the Filipino language".

On October 3, 1999, Abriol – then 81 years old – also became a recipient of the Ten Outstanding Elderly of the Philippines Award (Sampung Ulirang Nakatatanda) for his religious work and writings that were offered "for the use and edification of the ordinary faithful". The award was given to Abriol at St. Paul’s College - Quezon City.

== Works ==
The translation works of Abriol include the following:

- Ang Bagong Tipan [The New Testament] (translator, 1997)
- Ang Lumang Tipan [The Old Testament] (translator)
- Ang Banal na Biblia [The Holy Bible] (translator, 2000), ISBN 971-590-107-7

== See also ==
- Catholic Church in the Philippines
