= Pasonanca Park =

Public park in Zamboanga City, Philippines

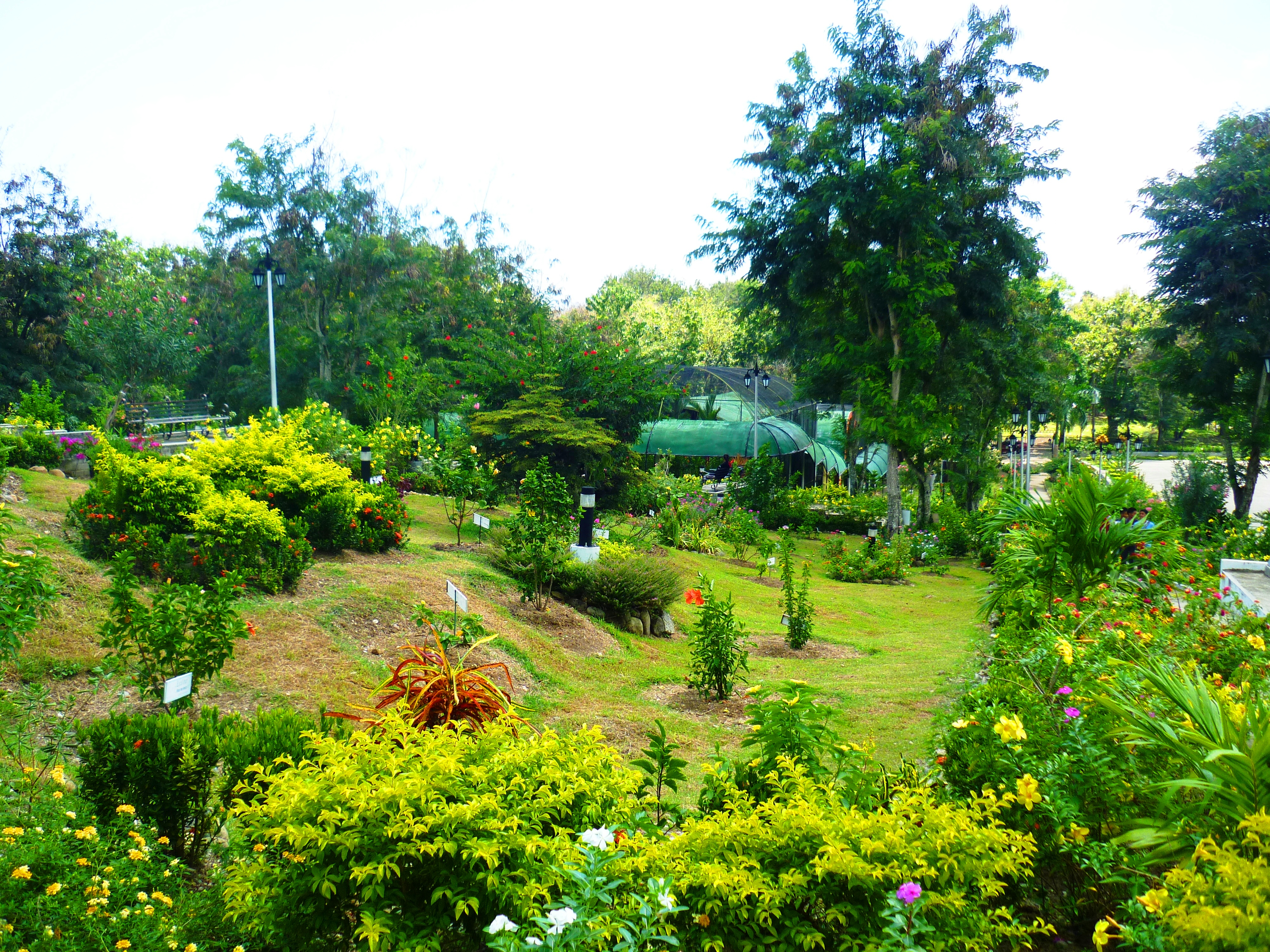
- Flower Garden in the park

General information
- Location: Brgy. Pasonanca, Zamboanga City, Philippines
- Coordinates: 6°57′12″N 122°04′23″E
- Owner: Philippine Government

Pasonanca Park is a public park located in Pasonanca in Zamboanga City, Philippines.

== History ==
Construction of the park was started in 1912 by General John J. Pershing, Governor of the Moro Province, and completed during the administration of the Frank W. Carpenter, Governor of the Department of Mindanao and Sulu (1914-1920). Thomas Hanley, a marksman, arrived in 1912 from the United States at the request of Pershing to serve the same post at Pasonanca, and was responsible for the original layout of the park.

The park also has separate campsites for males and females, an amphitheatre, and a convention center, among other facilities.

== Pasonanca Park Swimming Pools ==
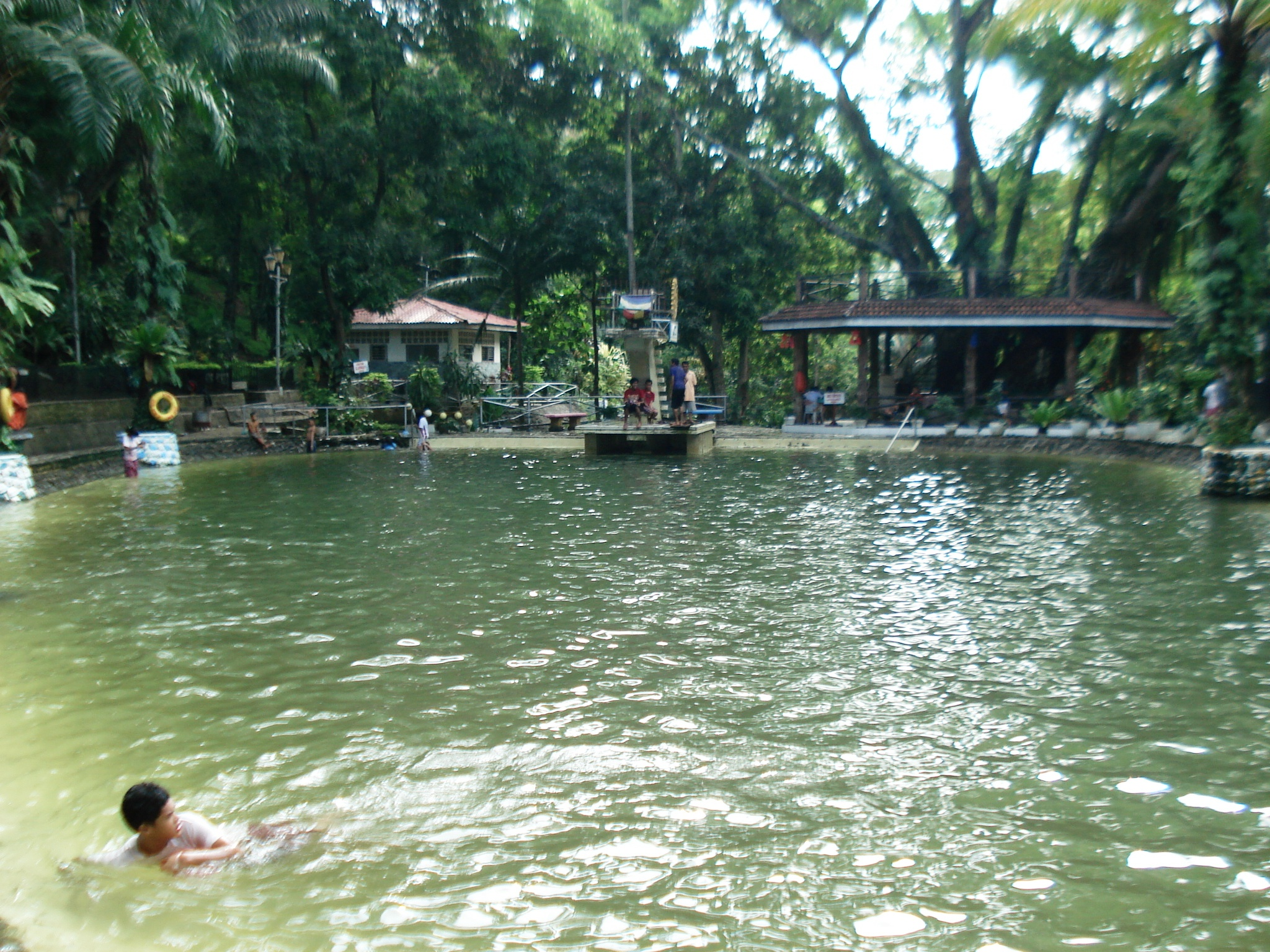
Pasonanca Main Pool 1

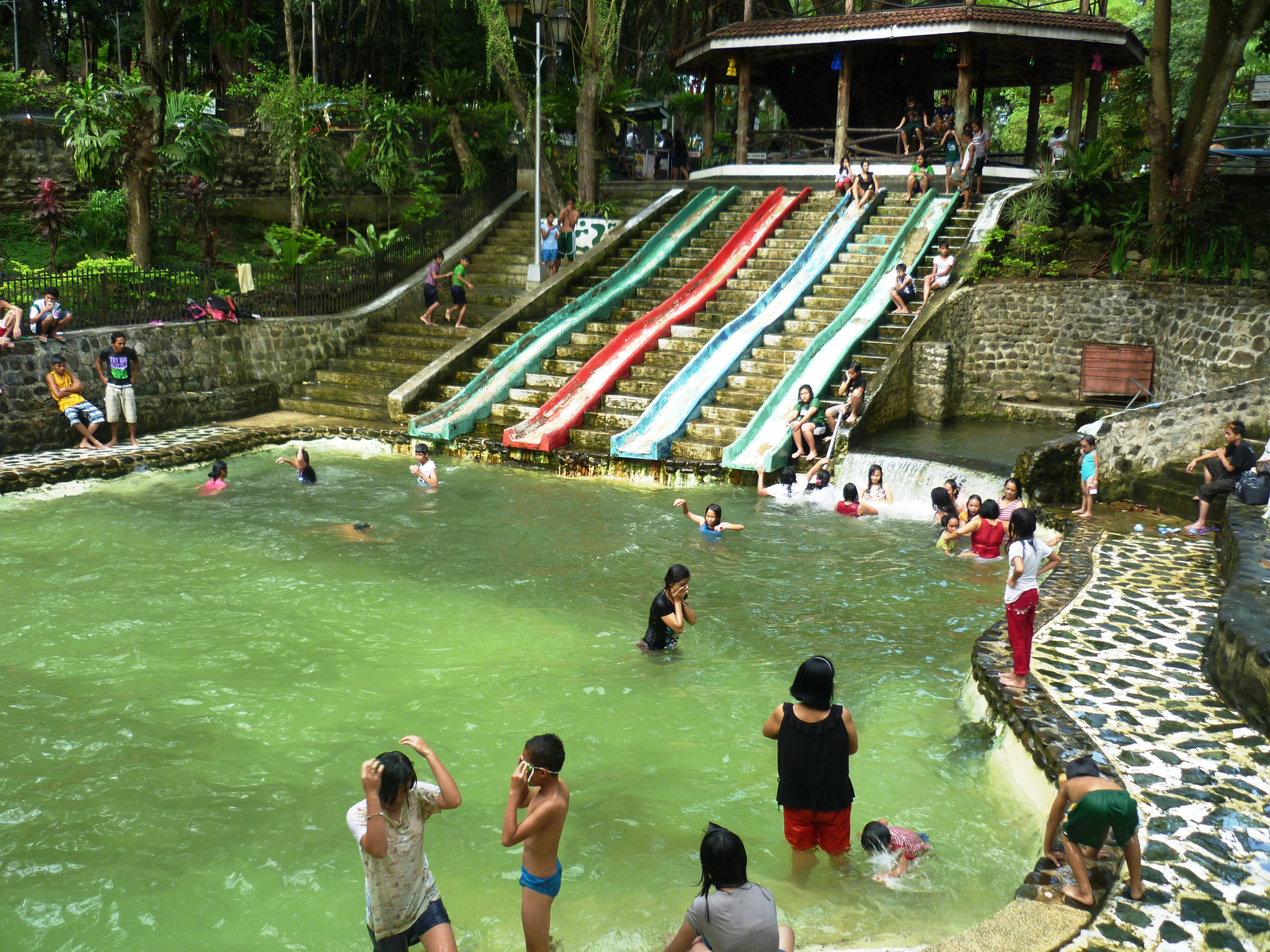
Pasonanca Main Pool 2

The park has three public pools. It boasts an Olympic-size swimming pool, a natural flowing pool and a children's pool with water slides. There are also many picnic areas.

Pictured here is the Pasonanca Kiddie Pool, designed for children's safety. There are four water slides. The slide furthest to the right is for beginners. The one furthest to the left is the fastest and for more skilled swimmers.

The water in the pool is not stagnant. It is constantly replenished by a surge of water naturally drained into the pool by gravity. As the water fills the pool, it is also immediately drained to create a natural creek that flows down the hill. The kiosks are available for rent for the whole day.

== Pasonanca Tree House ==
Originally constructed to be the "Youth Citizenship Training Center" in April 1960 with the generous assistance of the city council, the Pasonanca Tree House is visited by thousands of people each year. It can also be rented for a minimum fee, and has all the amenities of a small motel room.

== Pasonanca Park La Jardin de Maria Clara Lobregat and Butterfly Park ==
This is a garden park named after the late mayor Maria Clara Lobregat. The park consists of floral and butterfly species such as orchids, roses and colorful butterflies surrounding the garden. It also has an aviary park for species such as parrots, turkeys and eagles.

The entrance fee is much cheaper than other parks in Zamboanga.

=== Gallery ===
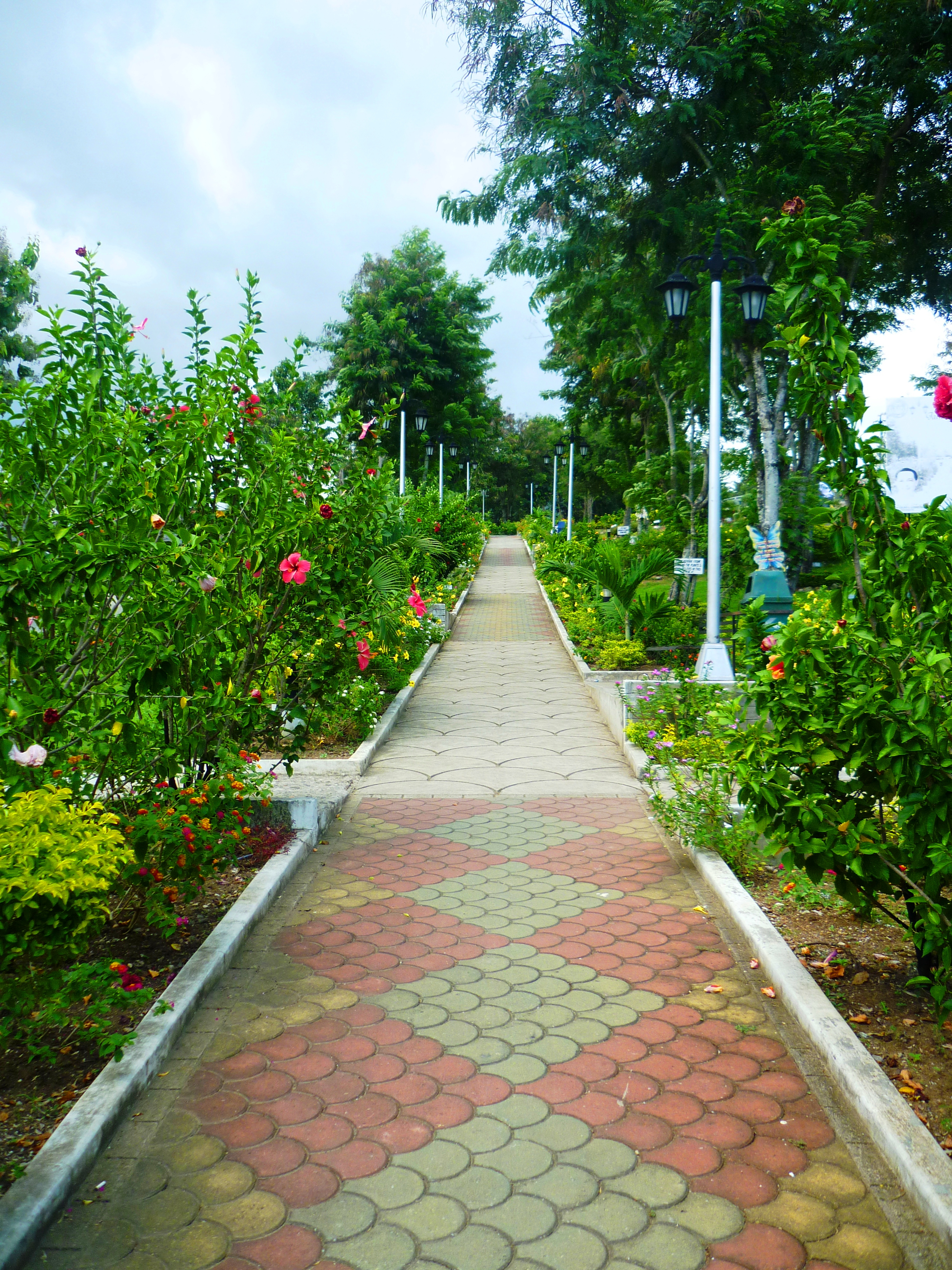
Main Entrance of La Jardin Maria Clara Lobregat

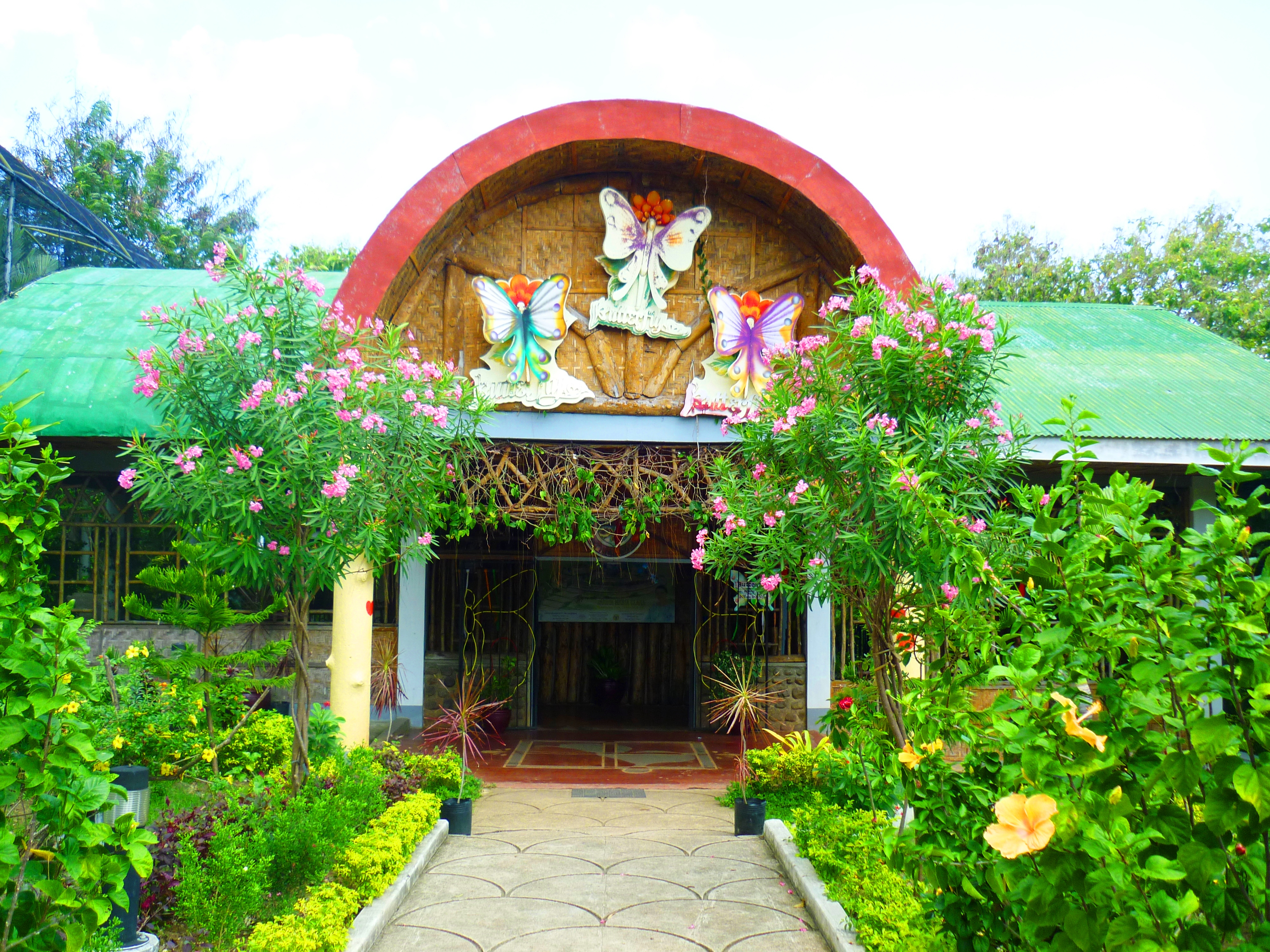
Butterfly Park in La Jardin Maria Clara Lobregat

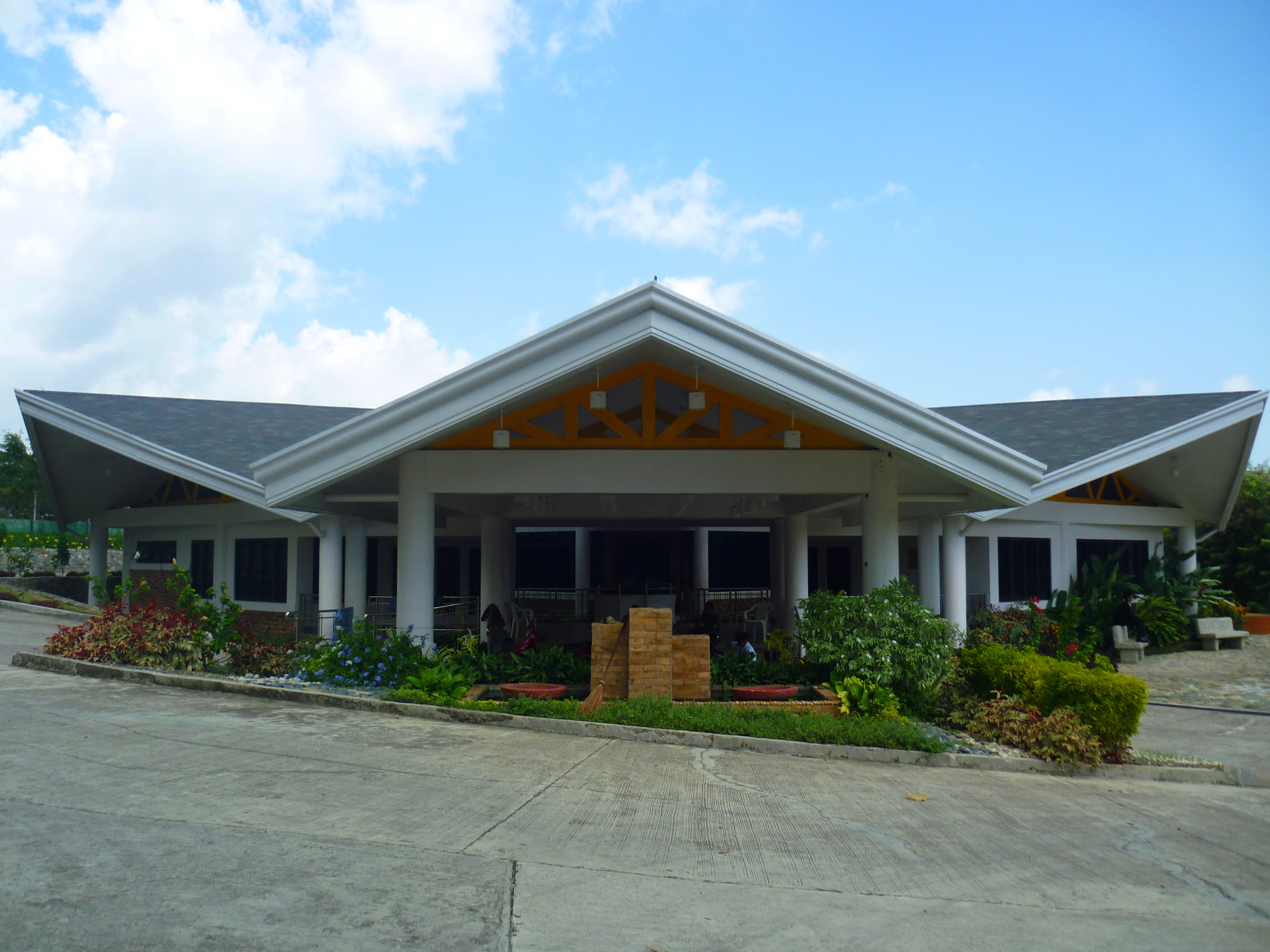
Zamboanga City Museum

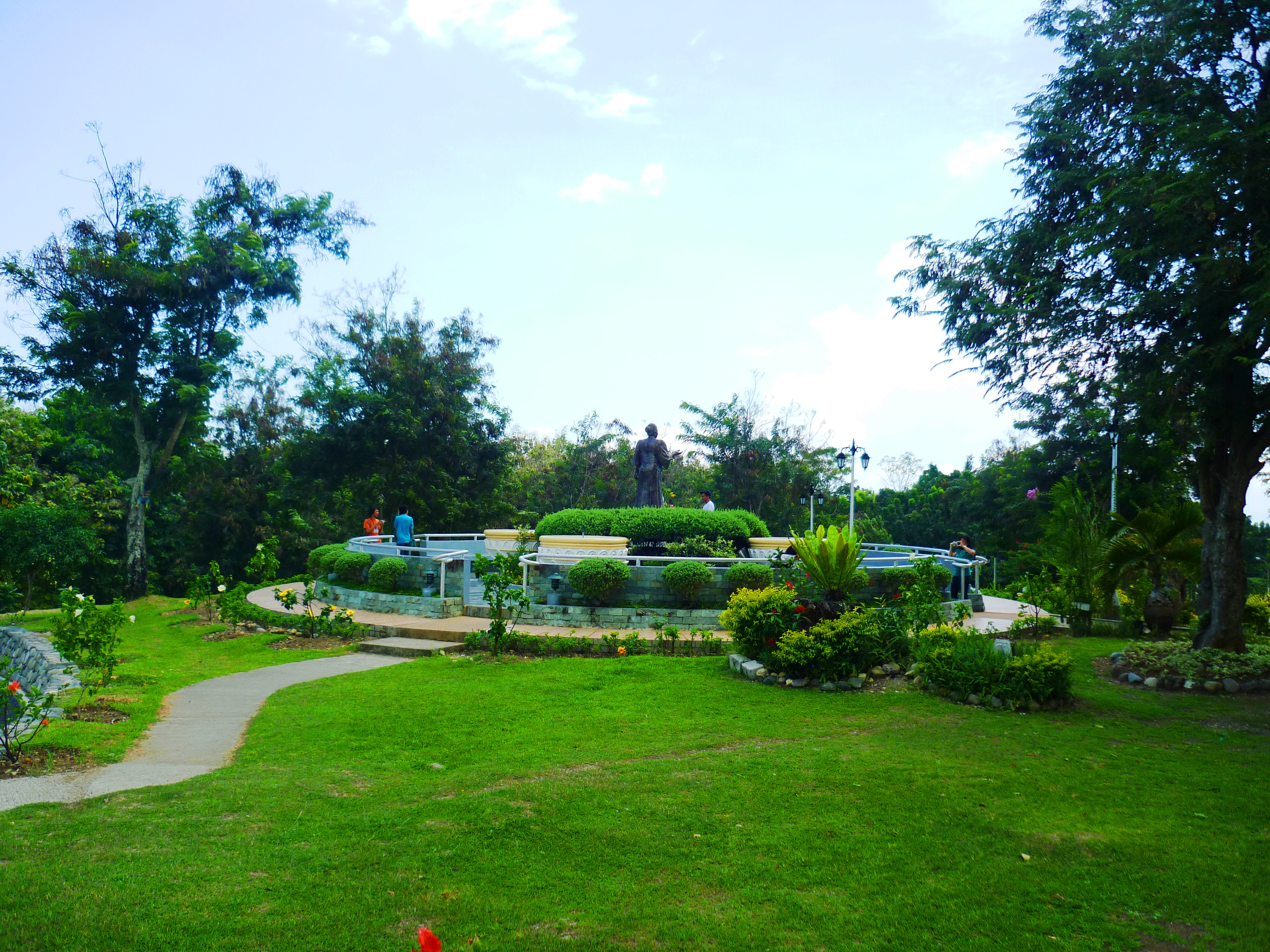
Maria Clara Lobregat Statue

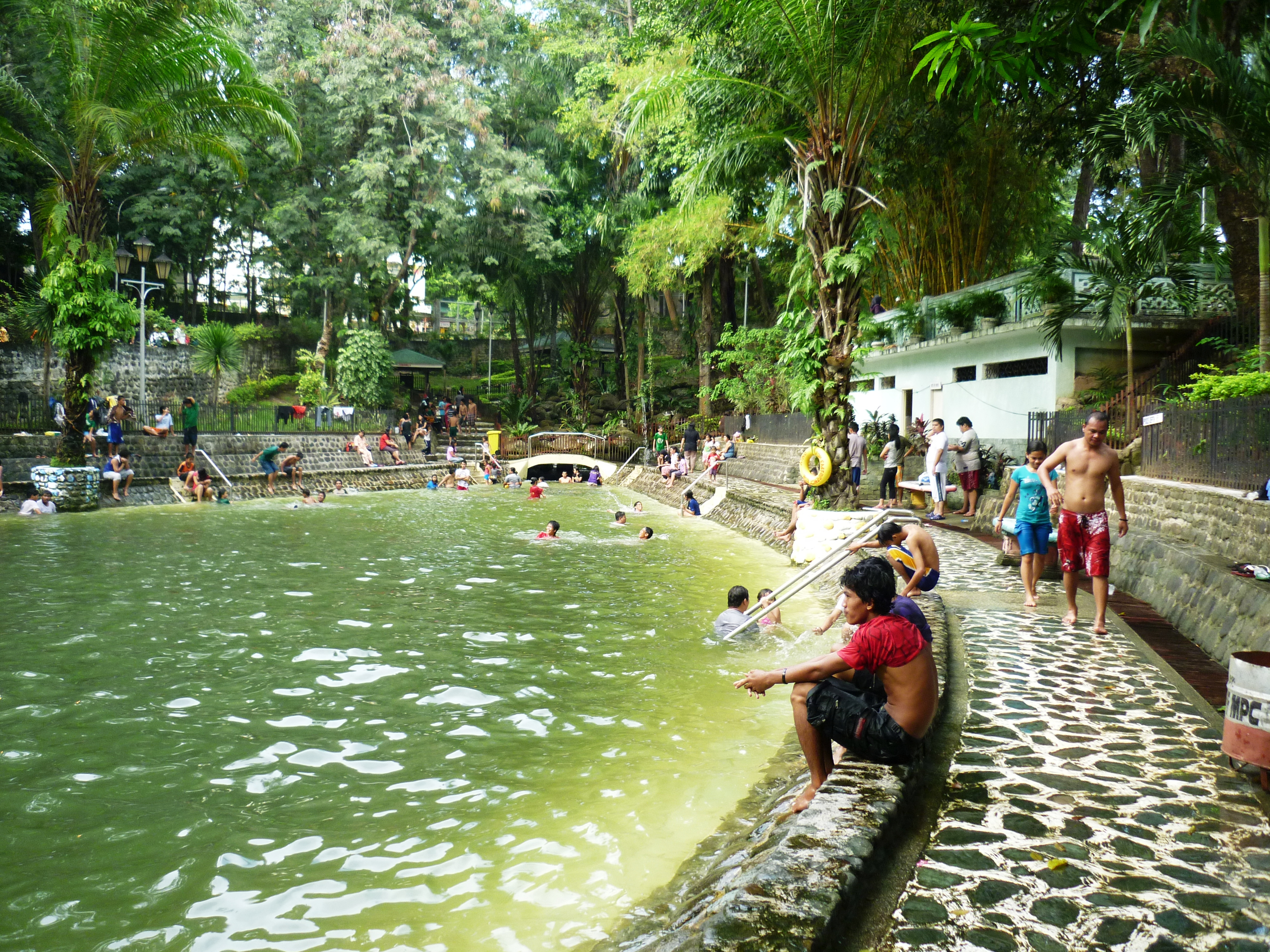
Pasonanca Main Pool 3

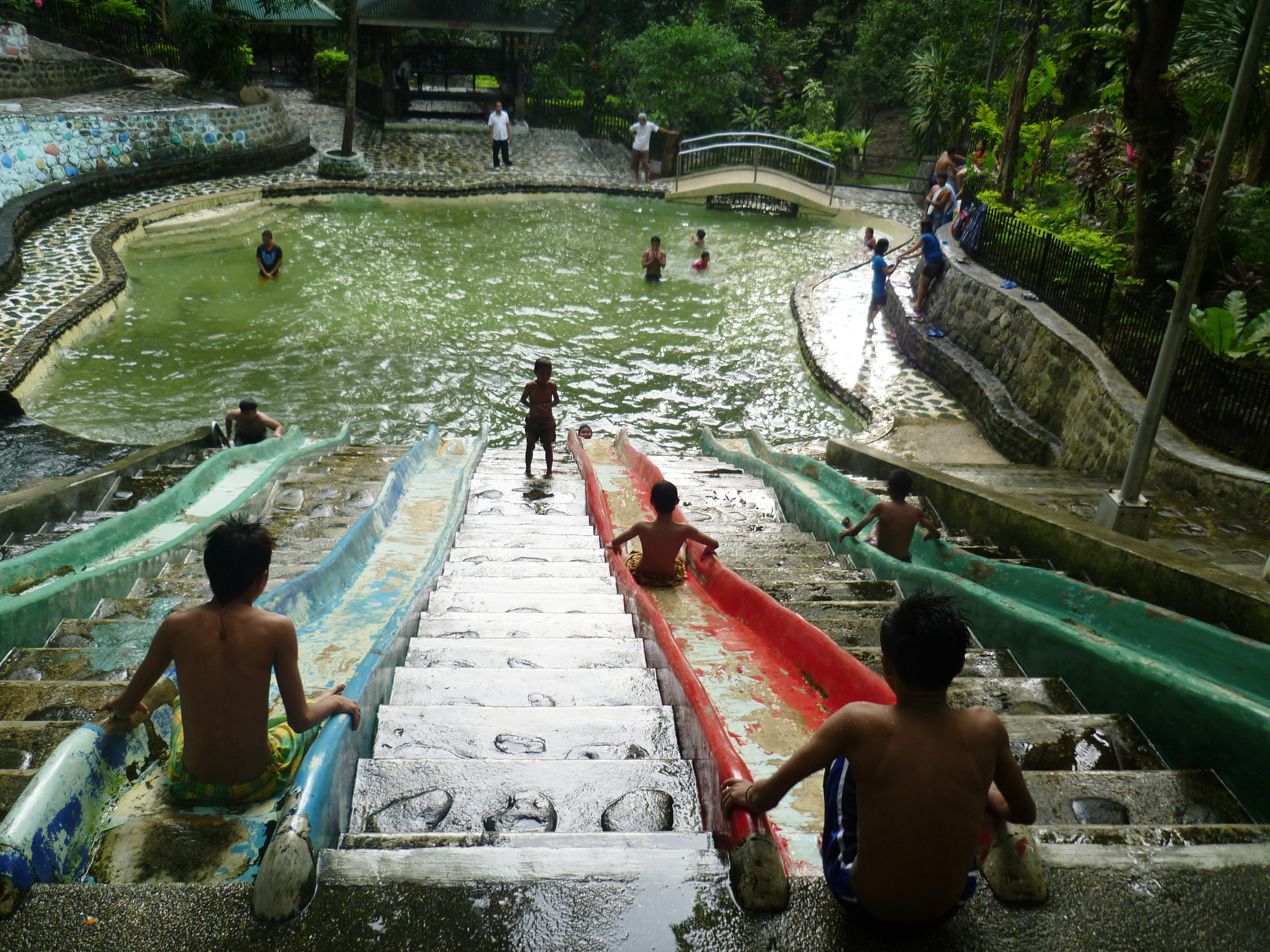
Pasonanca Main Pool 4

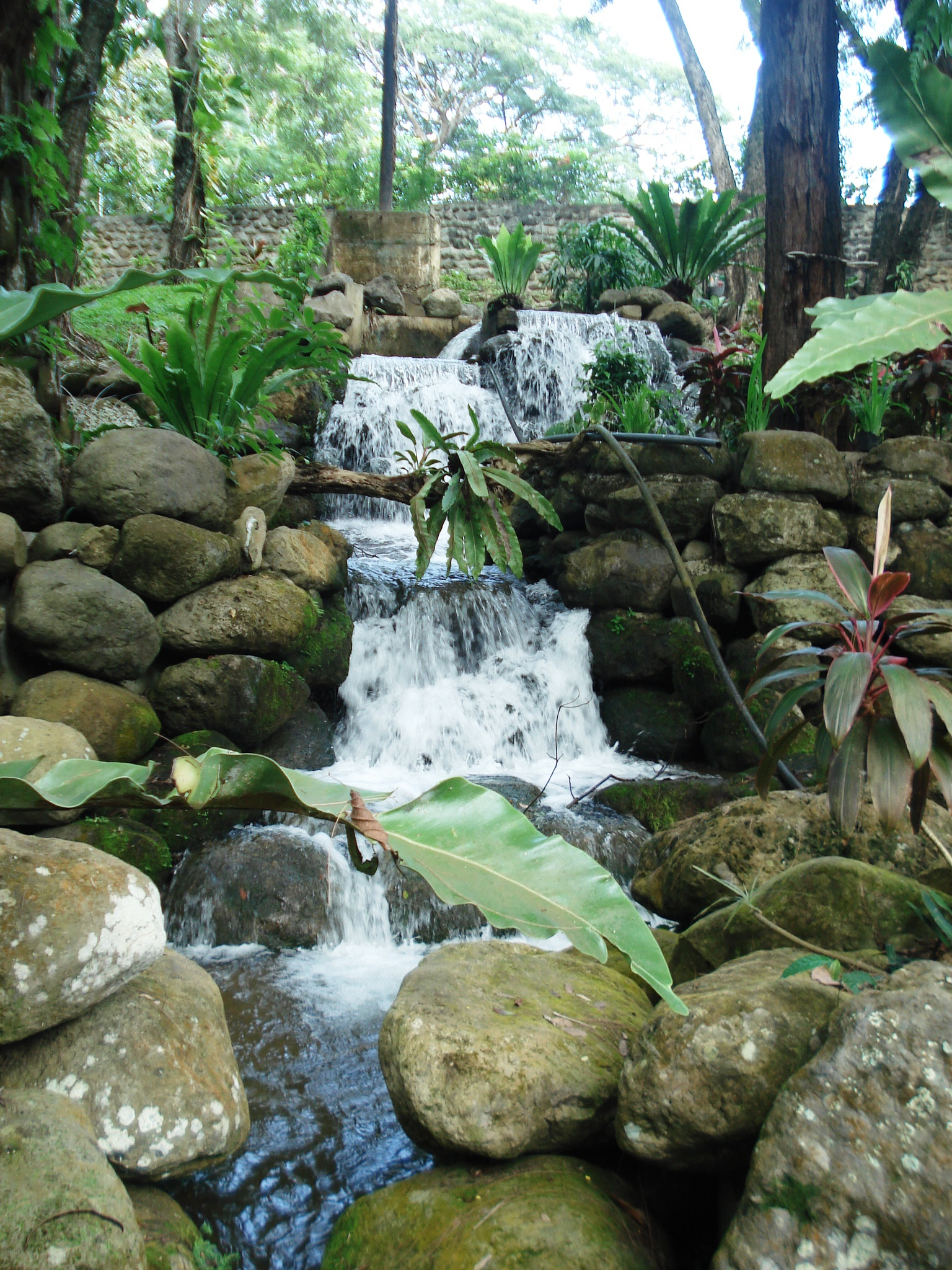
Pasonanca Waterfalls
