= Boy Scouts of the Philippines =

Scouting organization in the Philippines

- Age range: KID Scout: 4–6 (Light blue Neckerchief); KAB Scout: 6–9 (Yellow Neckerchief); Boy Scout: 9–12 (Green Neckerchief); Senior Scout: 13-18 (Red Neckerchief); Rover Scout: 18–26 (Navy blue Neckerchief)
- Headquarters: Natividad Lopez St., Ermita, Manila
- Country: Philippines
- Founded: October 31, 1936; 89 years ago
- Founders: Josephus Emile H. Stevenot; Manuel R. Camus; Vicente P. Lim; Carlos P. Romulo; Jorge B. Vargas; Arsenio Luz; Gabriel A. Daza
- Membership: 3,344,799 (2023)
- Chief Scout: President Bongbong Marcos
- National President: Emilio B. Aquino
- Secretary General: Cedrick G. Train
- Affiliation: World Organization of the Scout Movement; Asia-Pacific Scout Region; ASEAN Scouts Association for Regional Cooperation
- Website scouts.gov.ph

Boy Scout	Senior Scout	Rover Scout

The Boy Scouts of the Philippines (BSP) is the national Scouting organization of the Philippines in the World Organization of the Scout Movement (WOSM). The Boy Scouts of the Philippines is currently the second-largest scouting organization in the world with 3,344,799 members as of 2023.

The Scout movement was first introduced in the Philippines in 1910 during the American occupation period. The BSP was later recognized as a Member Organization of the Boy Scouts International Conference on October 31, 1936.

== History ==
The first Boy Scout troops in the Philippines were organized in 1910 by Elwood Brown, the Physical Director of the YMCA in Manila. This development came just three years after the founding of the Scout Movement and two years after the establishment of the Boy Scouts of America (BSA). Robert Baden-Powell, founder of the Boy Scouts Association in the United Kingdom, later recognized Brown as "Chief Scoutmaster."

Additional troops were formed in 1913 by Mark Thompson, Antonio Torres, Domingo Ponce, and Francisco Varona. In November 1914, Sherman L. Kiser organized the Lorillard Spencer Troop in Zamboanga City, the first troop established on the southern island of Mindanao.

Scouting activities expanded further in 1922. In January of that year, Silliman Institute began a program under the auspices of its church, applying for registration with the BSA National Headquarters in New York. The registration was granted in January 1923, predating the establishment of the BSA Philippine Islands Council No. 545 by several months. On April 19, 1922, a troop known as the Boy Scouts of Calivo was organized in Calivo, Capiz (now Kalibo, Aklan). Governor-General Leonard Wood acknowledged the group in an official letter dated January 2, 1923.

In October 1923, the Rotary Club sponsored the creation of the BSA Philippine Islands Council as a territorial council overseeing Scout troops across the country. Initially intended to cover Manila and nearby areas, the council soon extended nationwide. Scouting programs diversified during the following decade: Sea Scouting and Cub Scouting were introduced in 1931, while Rover Scouting followed in 1934.

The Philippines made its first appearance at an international Scouting event in 1933, when the Philippine Islands Council delegation joined the BSA contingent to the 4th World Scout Jamboree in Budapest, Hungary. The BSA Shanghai District was later placed under the supervision of the Philippine Islands Council.

=== Establishment of the BSP ===
On October 31, 1936, the Boy Scouts of the Philippines (BSP) was officially chartered under Commonwealth Act No. 111. US Army officer and entrepreneur Josephus Stevenot was appointed as the organization’s first president and Chief Scout. In October 1937, the BSA Philippine Islands Council voted to transfer its properties and responsibilities to the newly formed Boy Scouts of the Philippines.

The BSP was formally inaugurated on January 1, 1938, by President Manuel L. Quezon. Exequiel Villacorta became the organization’s first Chief Scout Executive, a role modeled after the Boy Scouts of America. Scouting activities were disrupted during the Second World War. Under the Japanese-sponsored Second Philippine Republic, many activities were either abolished or absorbed into paramilitary-style programs of the Scout Association of Japan. Scouting in the Philippines was revived after the war, resuming nationwide by late 1945.

=== Independence era ===
Following full Philippine independence in July 1946, the BSP began to participate more actively in international Scouting. In 1947, it sent a contingent to the 6th World Scout Jamboree in Moisson, France, marking its first international appearance as a full member of the World Organization of the Scout Movement. The Asia-Pacific Scout Region was later established in 1956.

In 1953, the first Wood Badge course in the Philippines was held at BSP Camp Gre-Zar in Novaliches, Quezon City. A year later, the BSP hosted its first National Scout Jamboree at Rolling Hills, Balara, Quezon City. Mariano Villarama de los Santos became the first Filipino to serve on the World Scout Committee, from 1957 to 1959. In 1959, the 10th World Scout Jamboree was held at the National Scout Reservation in Los Baños, Laguna, the first World Jamboree staged outside Europe and North America.

The 1960s saw efforts to indigenize Scouting programs. In 1960, the Cub Scout program replaced American symbols (such as Bobcat, Wolf, and Lion) with Philippine motifs (such as Kawan, Usa, Lauan, Molave, and Narra). In 1961, similar changes were made to the Boy Scout program, including replacing the Eagle Scout rank with Maginoo and Jose Rizal Scout.

In 1963, 24 members of the BSP delegation to the 11th World Scout Jamboree in Marathon, Greece, died in a plane crash in the sea off the coast of Mumbai, India. Streets in the South Triangle District of Quezon City were later named in their memory. In 1968, Boy Scouts, Rovers, and Scouters joined in the search-and-rescue operations for victims of the Ruby Tower collapse in August. For the services rendered by the Scouts, the BSP organization was awarded by President Ferdinand Marcos with a Presidential Gold Medal the following year.

In 1970, Senior Scouting was officially launched as part of the BSP program. It has three sections: Air (grey uniform), Land (dark green), and Sea (white). In 1971, Ambassador Antonio C. Delgado was elected Chairman of the World Scout Conference, becoming the first Filipino to hold this position. In 1972, BSP membership hit the one-million mark nationwide.

The Philippines hosted the Golden Jubilee Jamboree in 1973 at Los Baños, Laguna, which also served as the first Asia-Pacific Scout Jamboree. The jamboree song, Kapatirang Paglilingkod ("Brotherhood of Service"), reflected the themes of the Bagong Lipunan regime. During 1974–75, the Cub Scout program was renamed Kab Scout, as the Pilipino alphabet of the time did not include the letter C. “Kab” was created as an acronym for Kabataan Alay sa Bayan (“Youth Offered to the Nation”).

Between 1975 and 1986, following orders from President Marcos, the organization was renamed Kapatirang Scout ng Pilipinas (“Scout Brotherhood of the Philippines”). The number of age groups was reduced from four to two, and both the Scout Oath and Scout Law were revised. A new Scout badge was also introduced. During this period, President Marcos assumed the title of Chief Scout, becoming the first Philippine head of state to hold the position.

=== Post-1986 developments ===
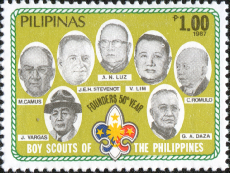
Founders of the Boy Scouts of the Philippines. Stamp for National Boy Scout Movement 50th Anniversary, 28 Oct 1987.

In 1986, the Boy Scouts of the Philippines marked its Golden Jubilee. Following the People Power Revolution, the organization abandoned the name Kapatirang Scout ng Pilipinas and reverted to its original name. Then-President Corazon Aquino, serving as the country’s first female Chief Scout, oversaw the change.

In 1990–1991, the BSP introduced a program for pre-school boys called KID Scouting. Since the English word “kid” did not align with Filipino terminology, it was reinterpreted as an acronym for Kabataang Iminumulat Diwa (“Youth with Awakened Spirit”), written in all capital letters. The 12th Asia-Pacific Jamboree took place in 1991 at the University of the Philippines Los Baños. The following year, the BSP reinstated its original badge design.

The Philippines went on to host a series of regional and international Scouting events. In 1993, it organized the first ASEAN Scout Jamboree. Manila hosted the 2nd World Scout Parliamentary Union in 1997, and in 1999, the first Venture Scout Jamboree was held at Ilian Hills, Iriga City, Camarines Sur.

In 2006, the Boy Scouts of the Philippines issued National Office Memorandum No. 47, S. 2006, which formally allowed girls aged 13 to 17 years old to join the BSP Senior Scout Program. Girls who wish to join the BSP are required to register first with the Girl Scouts of the Philippines and secure parental and guardian consent to join the BSP.

The BSP joined the worldwide centennial celebration of the Scout Movement in 2007. From December 28, 2009 to January 3, 2010, the Philippines hosted the 26th Asia-Pacific Scout Jamboree, the third held in the country. The BSP commemorated its 75th anniversary in 2011 and organized the National Peace Jamboree in 2013, held simultaneously at Mount Makiling in Laguna, Capitol Hills Scout Camp in Cebu City, and Camp Malagos in Davao City.

In 2014, the BSP marked the centennial of the Lorillard Spencer Troop, the first official Scout troop in the Philippines. A Centennial Jamboree was held across three sites: Marikina (Luzon), Cebu City (Visayas), and Zamboanga City (Mindanao).

The centennial of the BSA Philippine Islands Council was celebrated in 2023, marking the beginning of preparations for the BSP’s own centennial observances in 2036.

== Programs ==
=== KID Scout Program ===
KID Scouting (Kabataang Iminumulat Diwa) is for boys 4 to 6 years old in pre-school. They wear a light blue neckerchief.

=== KAB Scout Program ===
KAB Scouting (Kabataan Alay sa Bayan) is for boys 6 to 8 years old or Grades 1-3. They wear a yellow neckerchief. The one thing unique about the KAB scout program is that their program is based on "The Jungle Book" Because the moral lesson about the story is about Family or in the story are the wolves. Where the KAB Scouts follow the Law The aspects of survival and character.

=== Boy Scout Program ===
Boy Scouting is for boys 9 to 12 years old. They wear a green neckerchief. They are the one who help Elderly people cross the road, the experts of camping and always prepared. The Boy scout program is for Grades 4-6. The Boy Scout program focuses on "Learning by doing"

=== Senior Scout Program ===
Senior Scouting is for boys and girls 13 to 19 years old. They wear a red neckerchief. Scouts who complete the Senior Scout advancement program are awarded the Eagle Scout rank and medal, the highest rank awarded to a Senior Scout.

=== Rover Scout Program ===
Rover Scouting is for young men 16 to 26 years old. Rovers aged 24 and above are called Rover Peers. They wear a navy-blue neckerchief.

All ranks wear the organizational badge, with elements from the Flag of the Philippines (the national flag forms the basis of the trefoil colors) and the green neckerchief below the trefoil, in their uniforms.

== Legal classification and status ==
For much of its history, the Boy Scouts of the Philippines was regarded as a private organization. This status, however, has been the subject of several legislative acts and judicial rulings that have progressively defined it as a government-controlled entity:

- The BSP was first established under Commonwealth Act No. 111 on 31 October 1936, signed by President Manuel L. Quezon, which created it as a public corporation.
- Presidential Decree No. 460 (1974), issued by President Ferdinand Marcos, amended the BSP charter and designated the President of the Philippines as the Chief Scout.
- In Boy Scouts of the Philippines v. National Labor Relations Commission (G.R. No. 80767, 22 April 1991), the Supreme Court declared the BSP a government-owned or controlled corporation (GOCC) and a government instrumentality.
- Executive Order No. 509 (1992), issued by President Corazon Aquino, revoked an earlier conversion of the BSP into a private corporation.
- Republic Act No. 7278 (1992) further amended the charter to reorganize the BSP and emphasize its volunteer and democratic character.
- In Resolution No. 99-011 (1999), the Commission on Audit subjected the BSP to government audit.
- In Boy Scouts of the Philippines v. Commission on Audit (G.R. No. 177131, 7 June 2011), the Supreme Court en banc ruled that the BSP is a public corporation and that its funds are subject to COA jurisdiction.
- In Memorandum Order No. 2013-42 (2016), the Office of the President, through the Governance Commission for GOCCs, classified both the BSP and the Girl Scouts of the Philippines as sui generis GOCCs.

== Notable members and officials ==
Name	Notability	References
Valeriano Abello	Philippine Legion of Honor awardee	
Wendel Avisado	Former Secretary of Budget and Management and BSP National President	
Jejomar Binay	Former Vice President of the Philippines and BSP National President	
Elwood Brown	Physical education director of YMCA Manila and first scoutmaster of the Philippines	
Manuel Roxas Camus	Former senator and co-founder of the BSP	
Tomas Confesor	Former senator and Secretary of the Interior, Philippine Legion of Honor awardee	
Gabriel Daza	First Filipino electrical engineer	
Antonio C. Delgado	Former ambassador of the Philippines to the Vatican	
Roilo Golez	Former Philippine Navy captain, National Security Adviser and member of the House of Representatives	
Vicente Lim	First Filipino West Point graduate and World War II hero	
Ferdinand Marcos	Former President of the Philippines	
Roberto Pagdanganan	Former Secretary of Tourism and Secretary of Agrarian Reform	
William H. Quasha	US Army lieutenant colonel and former president and chairman of St. Luke's Medical Center	
Manuel L. Quezon	Former President of the Philippines	
Fidel V. Ramos	Former President of the Philippines and five-star general of the armed forces	
Hermenegildo Reyes	Co-founder of the University of the East	
Francisco S. Román	Former chairman of the World Scout Committee, and former BSP National President	
Carlos P. Romulo	Former President of the United Nations General Assembly, former Minister of Foreign Affairs, former Ambassador of the Philippines to the United States, former President of the University of the Philippines and co-founder of the Boy Scouts of the Philippines	
Samuel Stagg	Former Special Field Scout Commissioner of the Boy Scouts of America. and co-founder of the Cosmopolitan Church (United Church of Christ in the Philippines)	
Josephus Stevenot	US Army officer, co-founder of Boy Scouts of the Philippines and co-founder of Philippine Long Distance Telephone (PLDT)	
Jorge B. Vargas	First Executive Secretary of the Philippines, former presiding officer of the Philippine Executive Commission, first Filipino member of the International Olympic Committee	

== Jamborees ==
=== National Jamborees ===
Number	Host Island Group	Host city/Municipality	Date	Theme
1	Luzon	Balara, Quezon City	April 23–30, 1954	"To Strengthen National Consciousness and Foster National Unity"
2	Mindanao	Pasonanca Park, Zamboanga City	May 2–8, 1961	
3	Nationwide	Mount Makiling, Capitol Hills Scout Camp, Camp Malagos	June 12–19, 1965	
4	Luzon	Palayan City, Nueva Ecija	May 10–18, 1969	
5	Luzon	Los Baños, Laguna	December 28, 1973 – January 4, 1974	
6	Nationwide	Isabela, Cebu, Davao City	December 28, 1977 – January 5, 1978	"Jamboree for Development"
7	Nationwide	Goa, Cebu, North Cotabato	April 13–21, 1983	
8	Luzon	Baguio City	February 21–27, 1987	
9	Luzon	Los Baños, Laguna	January 21–27, 1991	
10	Mindanao	Surigao City	July 10–16, 1995	
11	Luzon	Clark Field, Angeles City	January 5–11, 1998	"Scouts: Mga Bayani sa Kinabukasan"
12	Visayas	Palo, Leyte	December 27, 2001 – January 2, 2002	
13	Luzon	Los Baños, Laguna	December 27, 2004- January 3, 2005	"Scouting: A Brotherhood for Peace and Unity"
14	Luzon	Los Baños, Laguna	October 23–29, 2007	"Isang Mundo, Isang Pangako"
15	Luzon	Los Baños, Laguna	May 26–31, 2011	"Scouts: Building Tomorrow Today"
16	Mindanao	Tagum City, Davao del Norte	October 24–30, 2015	"Peace and Development Through Scouting"
17	Luzon	Botolan, Zambales	December 1–7, 2019	"Saving Lives"
18	Visayas	Passi City, Iloilo	December 11–17, 2023	"Youth Engagement: Sustaining Relevance and Strengthening Resilience"
19	Mindanao	Tupi, South Cotabato	April 11-17, 2027	TBA

=== Special Jamborees ===
Name	Host city/Municipality	Date	Theme
10th World Scout Jamboree	Los Baños, Laguna	July 17–26, 1959	"Building Tomorrow Today"
1st Asia-Pacific Scout Jamboree	Los Baños, Laguna	July 17–26, 1959	"Building Tomorrow Today"
BSP Golden Jubilee Jamboree	Los Baños, Laguna	December 28, 1973 – January 4, 1974	
12th Asia-Pacific Scout Jamboree	Los Baños, Laguna	January 21–27, 1991	
1st ASEAN Scout Jamboree	Los Baños, Laguna	December 28, 1993 – January 4, 1994	
World Centennial Scout Jamboree	Los Baños, Laguna	October 23–29, 2007	"Isang Mundo, Isang Pangako"
26th Asia-Pacific Scout Jamboree	Los Baños, Laguna	December 28, 2009 – January 3, 2010	"Scouts: Creating A Better World"
National Peace Jamboree	Mount Makiling	February 22–28, 2013	"Scouts: Messengers of Peace"
National Peace Jamboree	Capitol Hills Scout Camp	February 23-March 1, 2013	"Scouts: Messengers of Peace"
National Peace Jamboree	Camp Malagos	February 24-March 2, 2013	"Scouts: Messengers of Peace"
Philippine Scouting Centennial Jamboree	Marikina City	November 4–8, 2014	"Peace and Development Through Scouting"
Philippine Scouting Centennial Jamboree	Capitol Hills Scout Camp	November 7–11, 2014	"Peace and Development Through Scouting"
Philippine Scouting Centennial Jamboree	Zamboanga Freeport Zone	November 9–13, 2014	"Peace and Development Through Scouting"
6th ASEAN Scout Jamboree	Tagum City, Davao del Norte	November 27-December 2, 2017	"Growth and Stability"
33rd Asia-Pacific Scout Jamboree	Kainomayan Scout Camp	December 14–21, 2025	"Be Prepared: Scouts for Peace and Sustainable Development"
