= Girl Scouts of the Philippines =

Philippine girls' association

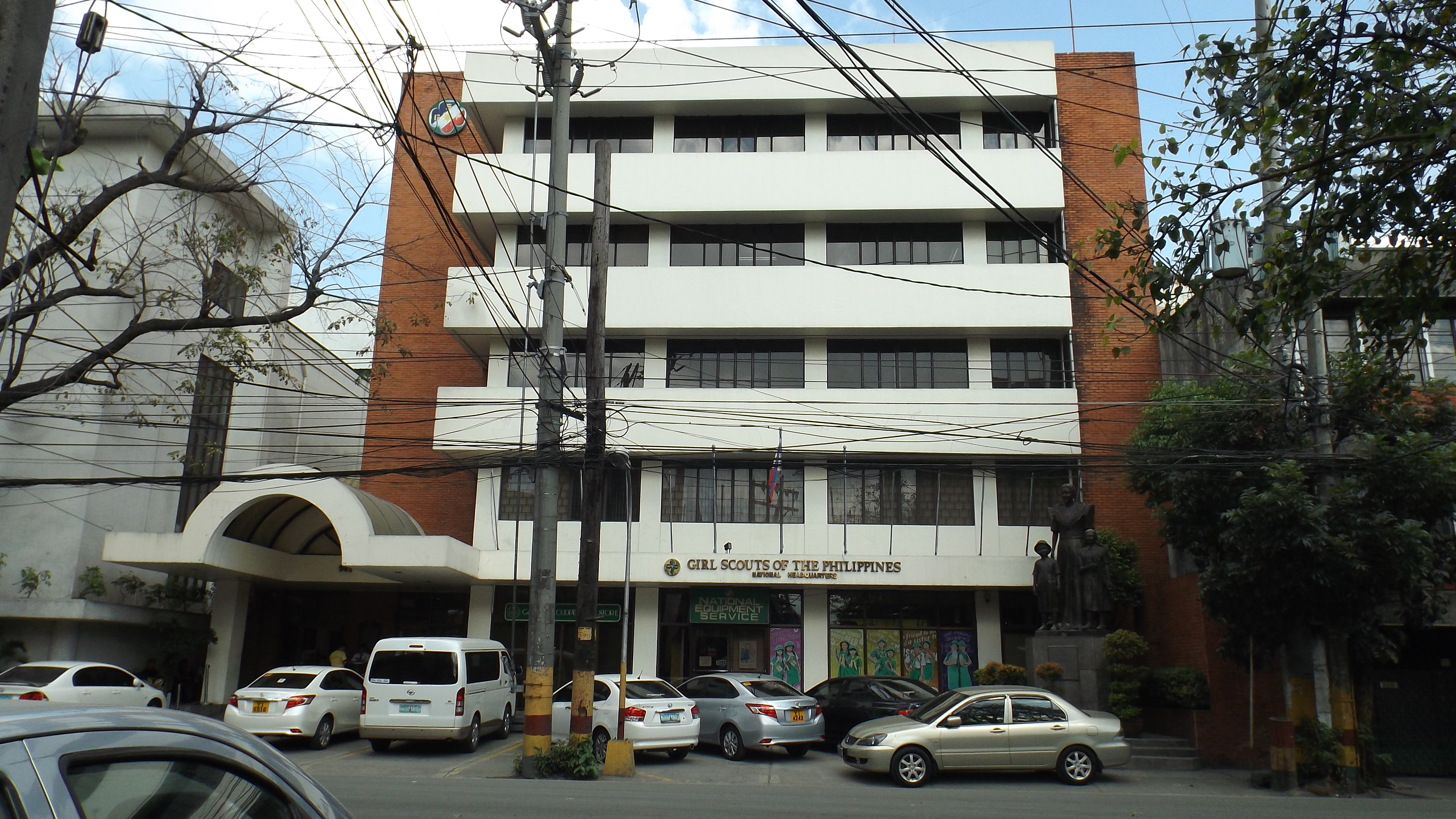
- Facade of the National Headquarters Padre Faura Ermita Manila

- Official emblem

- Location within Metro Manila
- Age range: Twinkler Scout: 4–6; Star Scout: 6–9; Junior Girl Scout: 9–12; Senior Girl Scout: 12-15; Cadet Girl Scout: 15–26
- Location: 901 Padre Faura Street, Ermita, Manila
- Country: Philippines
- Coordinates: 14°34′51″N 120°59′16″E
- Founded: May 26, 1940
- Founder: Josefa Llanes Escoda
- Membership: 800,000 (2017)
- National President: First Lady Liza Araneta Marcos
- Affiliation: World Association of Girl Guides and Girl Scouts
- Website www.girlscouts.org.ph

| Star Scout | Scout |

The Girl Scouts of the Philippines (GSP) is the national Girl Scouting association for girls and young women in the Philippines. Its mission is "to help girls and young women realize the ideals of womanhood and prepare themselves for their responsibilities in the home, to the nation, and to the world community". The girls-only association serves 800,000 members, as of 2017.

The first Girl Scout troops were organized in the Philippines as early as 1918 by American missionaries and servicemen. These Scout troops were directly registered with the Girl Scouts of the USA.

Pilar Hidalgo-Lim and Josefa Llanes Escoda spearheaded the organization of a Scout movement for girls, and requested the assistance of the Boy Scouts of the Philippines (BSP). In 1939, Mrs. Escoda was sent to the United States and Britain for training through the help of Joseph Stevenot of the BSP. Upon her return to the Philippines, she immediately started setting up the GSP with the help of other civic organizations.

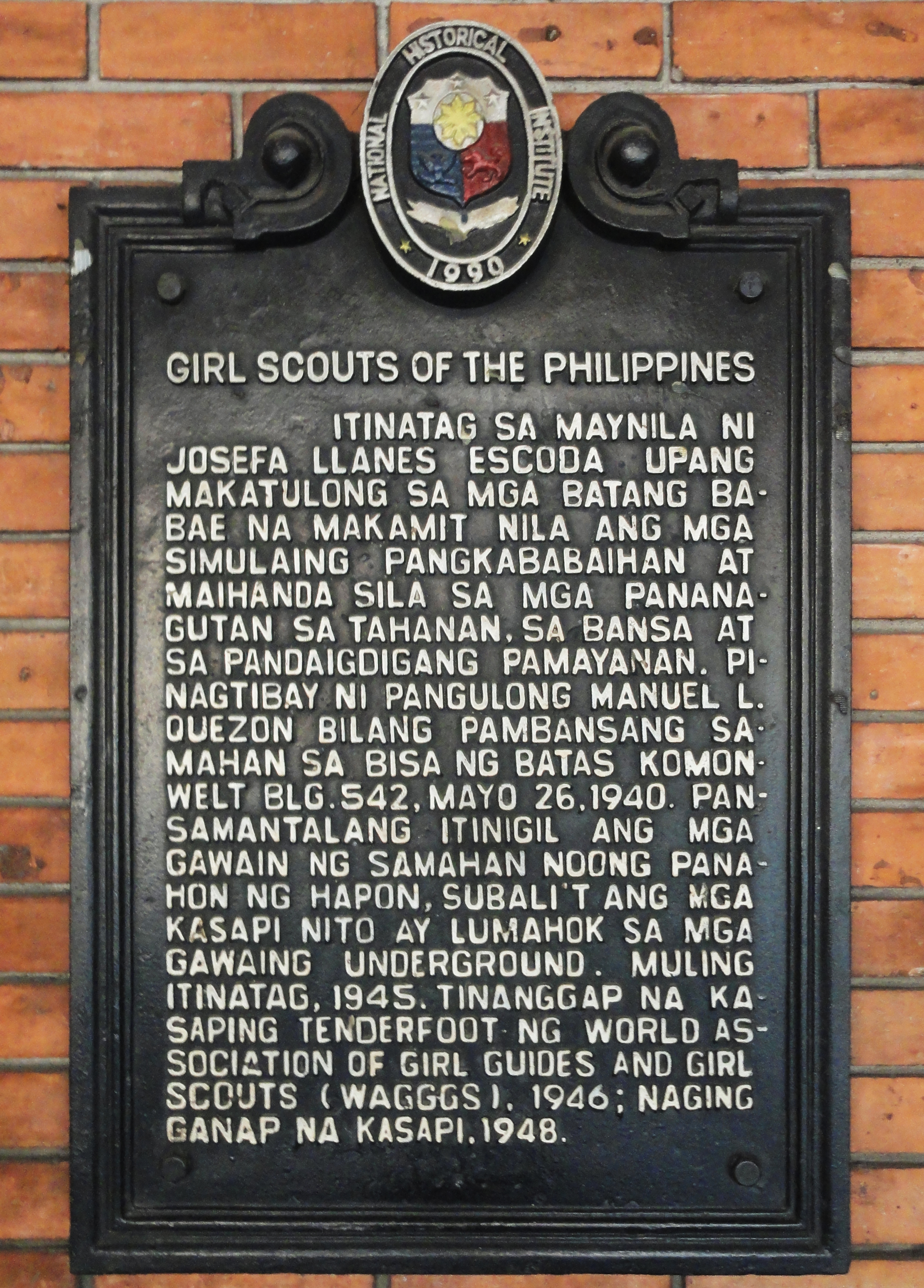
Historical marker

On May 26, 1940, the GSP was chartered under Philippine Commonwealth Act No. 542.

In 1946, the GSP was accepted as a tenderfoot member of the World Association of Girl Guides and Girl Scouts (WAGGGS) during the 11th World Conference held at Evian, France. In 1948, the GSP became a full member of WAGGGS during the 12th World Conference held at Cooperstown, New York.

Old GSP official logo (1940–2010)

Since 1995, the organization lost nearly half of its members; the membership number decreased from 1,275,113 in 1995 to 671,267 in 2003.

== Program ==
The GSP's program focuses on "well-being, family life, heritage and citizenship, world community, preparedness, economic self-sufficiency, arts and environment". Center of the program is the "eight-point challenge", a merit-badge program. The highest award is the "Chief Girl Scout Medal" which was introduced in 1976.

=== Sections ===
The association is divided in five sections according to age:

- Twinkler Scout – ages 4 to 6 (Pre-school), they wear a pink neckerchief
- Star Scout – ages 6 to 9 (Grades 1–3), they wear a yellow neckerchief
- Junior Girl Scout – ages 9 to 12 (Grades 4–6), they wear a golden-yellow neckerchief
- Senior Girl Scout – ages 12 to 15 (Grades 7–9), they wear an orange neckerchief
- Cadet Girl Scout – ages 15 to 26 (Grades 10–12 and college), they wear a purple neckerchief

=== Girl Scout Promise ===
On my honor, I will do my duty:
to God and my country;
to help other people at all times;
and to live by the Girl Scout Law.

=== Girl Scout Law ===
1. A Girl Scout's honor is to be trusted.
  Ang Girl Scout ay mapagkakatiwalaan.
2. A Girl Scout is loyal.
  Ang Girl Scout ay matapát.
3. A Girl Scout is helpful.
  Ang Girl Scout ay matulungín.
4. A Girl Scout is a friend to all and a sister to every other Girl Scout.
  Ang Girl Scout ay kaibigan ng lahát at kapatíd ng bawat Girl Scout.
5. A Girl Scout is courteous.
  Ang Girl Scout ay mapitagan.
6. A Girl Scout respects all living things.
  Ang Girl Scout ay magalang sa lahát na may buhay.
7. A Girl Scout is disciplined.
  Ang Girl Scout ay disiplinado.
8. A Girl Scout is self-reliant.
  Ang Girl Scout ay may sariling paninindigan.
9. A Girl Scout is thrifty.
  Ang Girl Scout ay matipíd.
10. A Girl Scout is clean in thought, word, and deed.
  Ang Girl Scout ay malinis sa isip, sa salitâ at sa gawâ.

The old emblem used until 2010 had features from the Flag of the Philippines. The current emblem only uses the 3 stars from it in a green trefoil.

== See also ==
- Estefania Aldaba-Lim
- Boy Scouts of the Philippines, helped in the foundation of the GSP in 1940
