= Rescue of Armenians during the Armenian genocide =

Individuals and groups who aided Armenians in escaping massacres

During World War I and until 1923, individuals and groups aided (or attempted to aid) Armenians in escaping the Armenian genocide perpetrated by the Young Turk government and later by Mustafa Kemal Atatürk. Since the end of the USSR and the independence of Armenia, research has increasingly focused on Ottoman individuals (Turks, Kurds, Arabs) and Western individuals (missionaries, ambassadors, etc.) who opposed the genocide during their time. It is generally acknowledged that such individuals or groups may have also assisted the victims of the Assyrian and Greek genocides, which occurred roughly around the same period.

== Ottoman civilian authorities ==
Several civilian officials opposed the genocide and sometimes went as far as saving Armenians. One such case is Hasan Mazhar, the governor (vali) of Ankara, who refused to participate in the genocide, was dismissed, and later returned to lead the Istanbul trials that sentenced the most obvious culprits of the genocide to death. Another example is Suleyman Nazif (governor of Baghdad) and his brother, Faik Ali Ozansoy, whom the perpetrators referred to as the "governor of the infidels" due to his rescue of over three thousand Armenians from the massacre and deportation.

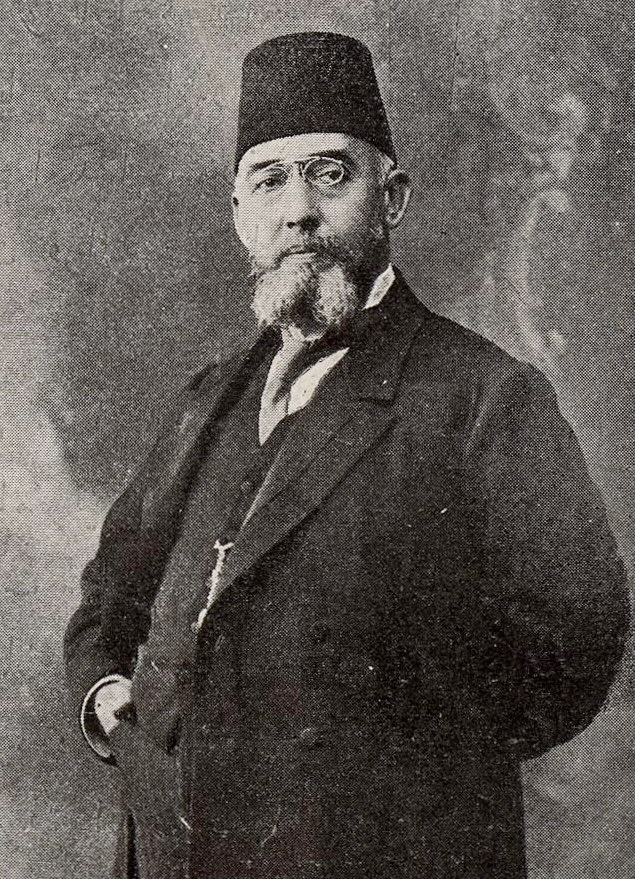
Mehmet Celal Bey in 1914

Mehmed Celal Bey, governor of Aleppo, refused to carry out deportations, leading to his transfer to Konya, where he once again rejected deportation orders; he became known as the Turkish Oskar Schindler. Confronting the ongoing genocidal policy, he traveled to Constantinople to seek explanations at the party headquarters. Upon his return to Konya, he found the entire Armenian population had been deported in his absence. He later said about his actions during the genocide:

"I was a person sitting by the edge of a river, with no means to save anyone. Blood was flowing in the river, and thousands of innocent children, blameless elders, defenseless women, strong young men, were cascading down that river into oblivion. All those I could save with my bare hands, I saved, and the rest, I believe, went down that river never to return."

Certain Ottoman governors opposing the state's intent of exterminating Armenians were executed or assassinated. Hüseyin Nesimi, the prefect of Lice, refused to obey oral orders and demanded a written directive; he was dismissed, summoned to Diyarbakır, and assassinated on the road by Mehmed Reshid. Alongside him, Ferit, the governor of Basra, Bedri Nuri, the lieutenant governor of Müntefak, Sabit, the deputy of Beşiri, and Ismael Mestan, a journalist, were also murdered.

The prefect of Midyat was also assassinated by the forces of Mehmed Reshid, nicknamed the "butcher of Diyarbakir," as reported in a telegram by the German consul in Mosul, Holstein: "The prefect of Midyat defied orders to kill Christians in his region; very swiftly, he was assassinated on the orders of the general governor of Diyarbakır."

== Muslim and other religious leaders ==
=== Muslim religious leaders ===
Some Ottoman religious leaders, like the Grand Mufti Mustafa Hayri Efendi, the second most important figure in Sunni Islam after the Ottoman Caliph, openly opposed the genocide as well. Mustafa Hayri Efendi was arrested, tried, and executed by the Young Turks.

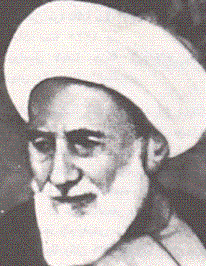
The Grand Imam of Al-Azhar, Salim al-Bishri

In 1909, in response to a Turkish sheikh calling for the massacre of Armenians during the Adana massacre, Sheikh Salim al-Bishri, the Grand Imam of al-Azhar University issued a fatwa against anyone participating in the Armenian massacres. In it, he said, among other things:

We have come across, through the local newspapers, saddening news and despicable reports about Muslims in some of the Anatolian provinces of the Ottoman realms. These include reports that they have transgressed against the Christians by attacking and brutally murdering them. We were shocked by such reports and hoped that they would prove to be false because Islam, as a general principle, absolutely forbids acts of unjustified aggression and forbids oppression, bloodshed and harming others, irrespective of whether they be Muslim, Christian or Jewish.

==== Hussein bin Ali ====
The most significant Muslim figure to have been involved in saving Armenians during the genocide is probably Hussein bin Ali, who proclaimed the Sharifian Caliphate in 1924 in replacement of the Ottoman Caliphate, after it was destroyed by Mustafa Kemal Atatürk. First, he condemned the genocide publicly as early as 1916, stating "We specifically bring to the world's condemnation the atrocities committed against the Greeks and Armenians, atrocities that our holy law can only disapprove of." In 1917, he made decisions to protect the Armenian refugees and those residing in his lands from the Armenian genocide. In this regard, he promulgated the same year, in a decree: "In the name of Most Merciful Allah and our prophet Muhammad, we are addressing our Arab brothers (...) to take Armenian refugees in their families, to share with them their belongings – camels, food, shelter, blankets – and share everything that you have in excess, and everything that you can give to people."

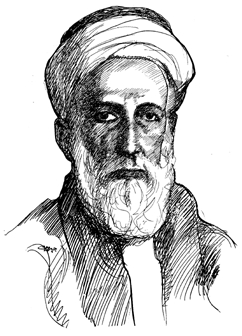
Hussein bin Ali drawn by Khalil Gibran, 1916

In April 1918, as part of his conquest of the Syrian territories in which the Armenian genocide took place, he issued a decree to protect Armenians from persecution and allow them to settle in peace, in which he ordered :

"What is requested of you is to protect and to take good care of everyone from the Jacobite Armenian community living in your territories and frontiers and among your tribes; to help them in all of their affairs and defend them as you would defend yourselves, your properties and children, and provide everything they might need whether they are settled or moving from place to place, because they are the Protected People of the Muslims (Ahl Dimmat al-Muslimin) – about whom the Prophet Muhammad (may Allah grant him His blessings and peace) said: "Whosoever takes from them even a rope, I will be his adversary on the day of Judgment." This is among the most important things we require of you to do and expect you to accomplish, in view of your noble character and determination."

The Armenian National Institute considers it to be the oldest declaration by a head of state to recognize the Armenian genocide. Alongside this, he gave citizenship to his Armenian subjects. According to survivors of the Armenian genocide, such as Levon Yotnakhparian, Hussein personally received him and was shocked by the news of what was happening. He also supported Armenian survivors and provided men and protection for expeditions in the Syrian desert aimed at rescuing Armenian deportees. According to testimonies, this method is said to have saved up to 4,000 people from the genocide, in collaboration with Hussein al-Attrache, a Druze chieftain who then disguised the refugees as Druzes. His son, Faisal, provided free transportation to all Armenian refugees for their trip towards the British refugee camp in Damascus and free use of the Hejaz railway; even if that meant impeding on the war effort.

=== Christian missionaries ===
During the Armenian genocide, numerous Western Catholic or Protestant missionaries became actively involved in attempting to save Armenians on-site. Among the missionaries, it is noteworthy that a significant proportion were women, who primarily cared for orphans and through these orphanages, managed to save Armenian, Greek, and Assyrian children from deportation. Some notable figures include Mary Louise Graffam, Grace Knapp, Nellie Miller-Mann, Maria Jacobsen, Anna Hedwig Büll, who saved thousands of Armenian children, Susan Wealthy Orvis, who rescued up to 4,000 Armenian and Greek children, Karen Jeppe, known as the Mother of the Armenians, Alma Johansson, Edwin Munsell Bliss, and Maria Gerber.

Missionary organizations, such as the German Society for the Assistance of Armenians and the American Board of Commissioners for Foreign Missions, were able to save thousands of Armenian victims, or at least attempt to, during the genocide.

== Diplomats, international organizations ==
The Armenian Red Cross of Constantinople, founded in 1913 by Zaruhi Bahri, whose own family perished in the deportations, became involved in the rescue of surviving children of the genocide.

== Various individuals ==
In the region of Deir ez-Zor, a major destination for many deportations, numerous Arab tribes, both Muslim and Eastern Orthodox, extended humanitarian assistance to the deportees. In Aleppo, Arab families were able to provide shelter to Armenians, both children and adults, in order to protect them from the genocide.
