= KSS =

KSS may refer to:

== Education ==
- Kelowna Secondary School, in British Columbia, Canada
- Kibuli Secondary School, in Uganda
- Kingsmill Secondary School, a former high school in Etobicoke, Ontario
- Kingston Secondary School, in Kingston, Ontario, Canada
- Klahowya Secondary School, in Silverdale, Washington
- Knightswood Secondary School, in Glasgow, Scotland
- Kranji Secondary School, in Choa Chu Kang, Singapore
- Kwalikum Secondary School, in British Columbia, Canada

== Entertainment ==
- Kalyana Samayal Saadham, a 2013 Indian film
- Kirby: Squeak Squad, a 2006 Nintendo DS game
- Kirby Super Star, a 1996 SNES game
- Kirby's Star Stacker, a 1997 Game Boy game

== Other ==
- Basketball Federation of Serbia (Serbian: Кошаркашки Савез Србије/ Košarkaški Savez Srbije)
- Communist Party of Slovakia (since 1992) (Slovak: Komunistická strana Slovenska)
- Communist Party of Slovakia (1939) (1939–1990) (Slovak: Komunistická strana Slovenska)
- Kata'ib Sayyid al-Shuhada, an Iraqi Shia militia
- Kearns–Sayre syndrome, a disease caused by mitochondrial DNA deletion
- Key Safety Systems, now known as Joyson Safety Systems
- Keystone State Skinheads, a white nationalist group in Pennsylvania
- Khitan small script, an partly undeciphered Chinese script
- Khwarizmi Science Society, a scientific society in Pakistan
- Kinetic Style Sheets, an AJAX framework for the software Plone
- Kirtland Safety Society, a defunct Mormon bank in Kirtland, Ohio
- Kissi language (ISO 639 code: kss)
- Kristiania Sporveisselskab, a defunct tram company in Oslo, Norway
- KSS (company) (ケイエスエス), a Japanese anime studio
- KSS Design Group, an architecture design group
- Kudumbi Seva Sanghom, an Indian organisation; see Kudumbi
- The postnominal letters for a papal Knight of the Order of St. Sylvester
- Sikasso Airport (IATA airport code: KSS) in Mali
- Velocette KSS, a British motorcycle
- Kurdish Sorani Standard Bible
- Kochi Sun Sun Broadcasting, a television station in Kochi Prefecture, Japan
- KSS, the Korean Attack Submarine program
