= Anna Klindt Sørensen =

Danish artist

Anna Klindt Sørensen (9 August 1899 – 28 July 1985) was a Danish painter and illustrator. She is now remembered as a strong, self-assured woman who practised French Expressionism on her own terms in Denmark.

== Biography ==
Born in Ry in central Jutland, Anna Klindt Sørensen came from a well-to-do family who owned a large estate. She received private painting lessons at home from the landscape painter Pauline Thomsen, a pupil of Vilhelm Kyhn. After schooling in Silkeborg and at Askov Folk High School, she entered Albertine Wesenberg's school for porcelain decoration in Copenhagen but soon left to concentrate on painting, producing Udsigt over Øm Kloster (1918) in Thomsen's Naturalist style. After a short period at another folk high school, Borups Højskole, she prepared to enter the Royal Danish Academy of Fine Arts by studying under Viggo Brandt. She spent only three semesters at the Academy (1919–20) as she was not happy with Valdemar Irminger's approach to modern art. Instead, in 1923, she went to Paris where she studied under Marcel Gromaire, Fernand Léger and André Lhote, acquiring a good basis for creating her Expressionist works. In 1935, she returned to Denmark to spend another year at the Academy, this time studying sculpture under Einar Utzon-Frank. In 1936, she exhibited her sculptures, paintings, decorated glass and textiles at a private exhibition in Aarhus.

During the Second World War, she went to the island of Bornholm where, together with Olga Lau, Ebba Schou, Ellen Fisher and Asta Ring Schultz, she created an artists colony for women. She then lived partly in Copenhagen and partly in her home town in Jutland, where she painted warm landscapes of Djursland and Ry in addition to exotic scenes of foreign countries. Her portraits also exhibit personal vitality as can be seen in those of the artists Holger J. Jensen (1939) and Jeppe Vontillius (1944) and, above all, those of her mother.

Anna Klindt Sørensen died in Ry on 28 July 1985. Her work has been widely exhibited across Denmark, most recently in Næstved's Rønnebæks Holm.

== Awards ==
In 1963, Klindt Sørensen was awarded the Eckersberg Medal and, in 1976, the Thorvaldsen Medal.
