= Kurdish Christians =

Kurds who follow Christianity

Kurdish Christians کوردێن خرستیان, Kurdên Xirîstiyan
Regions with significant populations
- Kurdistan and Kurdish diaspora

Religions
- Catholicism, Eastern Orthodoxy, Protestantism Historically: Church of the East, Syriac Orthodox Church

Scriptures
- Bible

Languages
- Kurdish; Zaza–Gorani

Kurdish Christians (Note: Kurmanji: کوردێن خرستیان, Kurdên Xirîstiyan; Sorani: کوردە مەسیحییەکان, Kurde Mesîḧîyekan) refers to Kurds who follow Christianity. Some Kurds had historically followed Christianity and remained Christian when most Kurds were converted to Islam, however, the majority of modern Kurdish Christians are converts. Historically, Kurdish converts to Christianity came from diverse backgrounds, including Ancient Iranian religion, Zoroastrianism, Islam, and Yazidism.

== History ==
The westernmost Kurds in Anatolia converted to Christianity before the 7th century, which contributed to their gradual Hellenization by the 12th century. In contrast, the Kurds of eastern Anatolia largely resisted conversion and faced punitive measures from the Byzantines. At the advent of Islam in the 7th century, most of southern Kurdistan was predominantly Christian.

Nasr, later known as Theophobos and suggested to be of Kurdish origin, converted to Christianity after entering Byzantine service under Emperor Theophilus (829–842) and became a close friend and trusted military commander.

In the 10th century AD, the Kurdish prince Ibn ad-Dahhak, who possessed the fortress of al-Jafary, converted from Islam to Orthodox Christianity and in return the Byzantines gave him land and a fortress. In 927 AD, he and his family were executed during a raid by Thamal al-Dulafi, the governor of Tarsus.

In the late 11th and the early 12th century AD, Kurdish Christians made up a minority of the army of the fortress city of Shayzar, near Hama, Syria.

The Zakarids–Mkhargrdzeli, an Armenian–Georgian dynasty of Kurdish origin, ruled parts of northern Armenia in the 13th century AD and tried to reinvigorate intellectual activities by founding new monasteries.

Marco Polo, in his book, stated that a minority of the Kurds who inhabited the mountainous part of Mosul were Christians, while the rest were Muslims.

Kurdish Christian converts usually were a part of the Church of the East. In 1884, researchers of the Royal Geographical Society reported in Sivas about a local Kurdish tribe, likely of Armenian origin, which retained some Christian observances and sometimes identified as Christian.

== Contemporary Kurdish Christians ==
=== History and background ===
The first translation of a part of the New Testament into the Kurdish language was made available in 1856. The region has also historically been home to communities of "Kurdish Christians" who were not ethnic Kurds, but Armenians and Assyrians who lived in Kurdistan and spoke Kurdish. Additionally, some Hidden Armenians, ethnic Armenians who had been Kurdified and Islamized, later converted to Christianity as part of reconnecting with their Armenian heritage.

=== Post-Soviet conversions ===
Madai Maamdi, a Georgian Yazidi convert to the Georgian Orthodox Church, was ordained a priest in February 2023 by the North American Diocese of the Georgian Orthodox Church, becoming the first ethnic Kurd to be ordained as an Orthodox Christian priest.

=== Modern Iraq ===
The Kurdzman Church of Christ (Kurdophone Church of Christ) was established in Hewlêr (Erbil) by the end of 2000, and has branches in the Silêmanî, Duhok governorates. This is the first evangelical Kurdish church in Iraq. Its logo is formed of a yellow sun and a cross rising up behind a mountain range. In a 2007 interview with The New Humanitarian, Sabeer Ahmed, a Kurdish convert to Christianity and worker at Christ Church in Pishdar, claimed that about 500 Kurdish Muslim youths had converted to Christianity since 2006 throughout Kurdistan. In the same article, a Muslim community elder attributed the conversions to economic hardship and the desire to go abroad, a claim a local priest denied.

=== Conversions in Syria ===
In 2019, some 80–100 Kurds converted to Christianity in the city of Kobanî. An Evangelical pastor from Aleppo attributed the conversions to disgruntlement with Islam because of the Anti-Kurdish policies of Recep Tayyip Erdoğan who promoted Islamism and Turkish nationalism, as well as the atrocities committed against Kurds in Syria by Turkish-backed Islamists during the Syrian civil war.

=== Yazidi genocide and missionary controversy ===
Following the 2014 Yazidi genocide by the Islamic State, some Western evangelical groups identified the influx of displaced Yazidis as a "golden opportunity" for conversion, as Yazidis had previously been isolated in remote areas and difficult for missionaries to access. According to Christian Aid Mission's own reporting, by mid-2015 about 70 percent of displaced people reached through one ministry's outreach in Irbil and Dohuk were Yazidis, and the group claimed to have converted around 80 families, suggesting as many as 800 individuals.

The conversion efforts drew criticism from Yazidi officials. Vian Dakhil, a Yazidi member of the Iraqi parliament, alleged that Christian missionaries were exploiting the trauma of refugees by distributing Bibles and pamphlets alongside humanitarian aid. She urged the Kurdistan Regional Government to ban missionary activities in the camps. The KRG's office of Christian affairs responded that most established Christian aid groups and churches in the region behaved ethically and were not pushing conversion, attributing problems to newer, unestablished missions. Another Yazidi official, Khairy Bozani, described the conversion effort as a "threatening phenomenon" and alleged that some missionaries had offered cash to young Yazidis to convert.

== See also ==
- Bible translations into Kurdish
- Kurdish people
- Religion in Kurdistan

=== Other Christian minorities ===
- Berber Christians
- Arab Christians
- Azerbaijani Christians
- Turkic Christians
- Punjabi Christians
- Bengali Christians
