= Bodil Katharine Biørn =

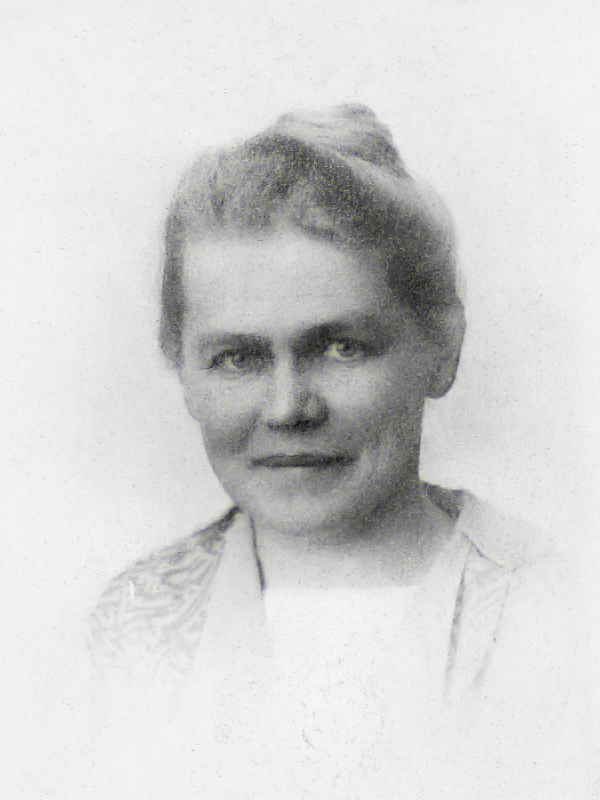
Bodil Biørn

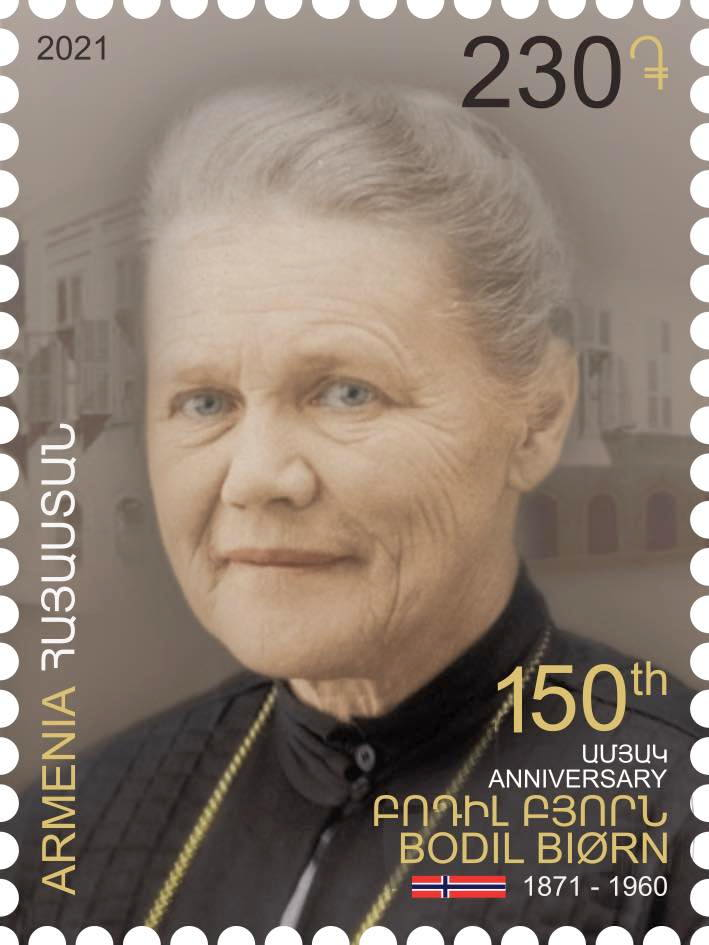
Biørn on a 2021 stamp of Armenia

Bodil Katharine Biørn (27 May 1871 – 22 July 1960), also known as Mother Katharine, was a Norwegian missionary.

== Biography ==
Biørn was born on 27 January 1871 in Kragerø, Norway, to the family of a wealthy ship owner. In 1905, after studying nursing in Germany, she was sent by the Women's Missionary Organization to the Ottoman Empire and worked as a missionary nurse in Mezereh, Kharberd Province and later in Mush. In cooperation with German missionaries, she opened schools and a clinic for widows and orphans. A witness of the Armenian genocide, she and her colleagues saved the lives of many homeless women and children. She also documented the horrifying and tragic events she witnessed through her testimonial diary and her photography. In the Near East, Biørn took care of Armenian orphans in Syria, Armenia and Turkey. In 1922 she founded an orphanage named "Lusaghbyur" in Alexandropol, Soviet Armenia. She continued her work by helping Armenian refugees in Syria and Lebanon. She died in Oslo on 22 July 1960.

At the initiative of the Armenian community of Aleppo, a statue honoring Bodil Biørn was created and shipped to the city of Kragerø and erected there in 2004. A delegation from Aleppo headed up by Jirair Reisian attended the ceremony.

She is the subject of the movies Map of Salvation (2015) and They Call Me Mother (2008).

== See also ==
- Witnesses and testimonies of the Armenian genocide
