= Nellie Miller-Mann =

American missionary

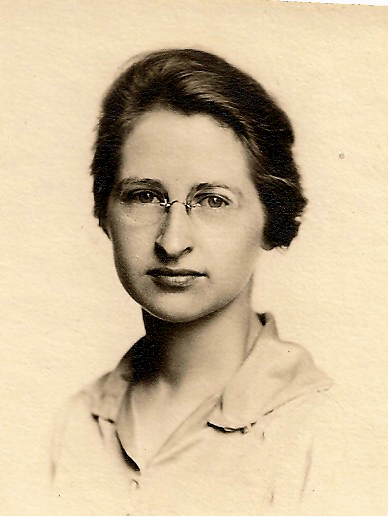
- Passport photograph of Nellie Miller-Mann
- Born: March 27, 1897; Elkhart, Indiana
- Died: February 2, 1997 (aged 99); Goshen, Indiana
- Occupations: Member of Near East Relief and witness to the Armenian Genocide

Nellie Miller Mann (March 27, 1897 – February 2, 1997) was an American secretary in the Near East Relief (1921–1923), and a Sunday school teacher in a Mennonite Church in Indianapolis.

During her time in the Near East Relief (now Near East Foundation), Nellie Miller Mann was instrumental in caring for hundreds of Armenian refugees who had survived the Armenian genocide. During her time working with the refugees, Miller Mann wrote and photographed much of what she experienced. Her writings and photographs have been recently been published in a book entitled, Letters from Syria 1921-1923.

== Early life ==
Nellie Miller Mann was born to parents Abram Rohrer and Selena Bell (Wade) Miller in Elkhart, Indiana, on March 27, 1897. During her early life, she became a member of the Mennonite Church. Mann then went to Goshen, Indiana, where she attended Goshen College. She studied there from 1918 to 1921. While studying there, she had overheard of the situation regarding the Armenians in the Ottoman Empire. Having been motivated to help, Orie Miller, the leader of the Mennonite Relief Commission, which later became known as Mennonite Central Committee, arranged for a number of Mennonite young men to go to Russia, Turkey and Syria under the Near East Relief Foundation to assist the refugees and orphans. After joining the Near East Relief, she immediately set sail to Syria where she was to assist Armenian refugees who have been deported outside of the Ottoman Empire as a result of the Armenian genocide.

== Near East Relief (1921-1923) ==
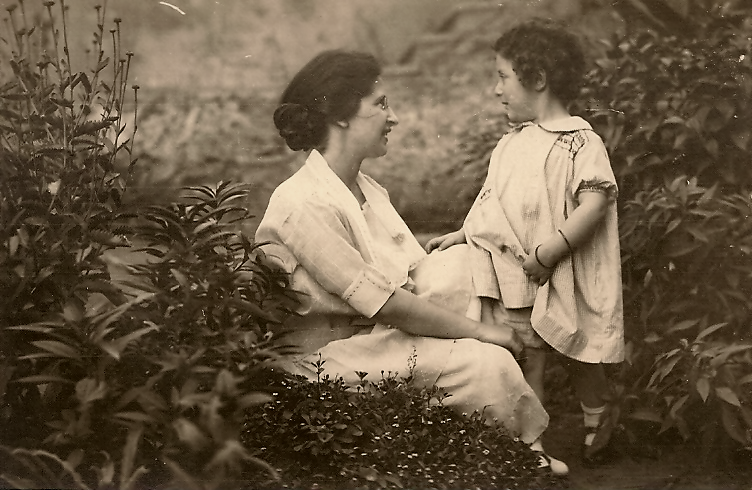
Nellie Miller Mann with a child at the Bird's Nest orphanage in Beirut

It was decided by the committee that Miller-Mann was to be shipped to Beirut where she was to serve as secretary to Ray Bender, the treasurer of the Near East Relief in the Beirut headquarters. She left from the New York City harbor on August 20, 1921, on the S.S. Patria, a French ocean liner, taking four weeks for her to cross the ocean, change ships, and stop at numerous ports in Italy, Greece, Egypt and Palestine, before arriving in Beirut on September 20, 1921. Earlier, in January 1920, as the Turkish War of Independence took hold, Mustafa Kemal advanced his troops into Marash where the Battle of Marash ensued against the French Armenian Legion. The battle resulted in a Turkish victory alongside the massacres of 5,000 – 12,000 Armenians spelling the end of the remaining Armenian population in the region. Upon her arrival in Beirut, she noted that in addition to the Armenian refugees who escaped in 1915, there was continuous influx of refugees as a result of the circumstances for the Armenians in Cilicia. She described the situation as follows:

The Near East Relief was organized at the close of the World war to take care of war orphans. This work was done and the Near East Relief still has many children to care for. Mustafa Pasha, head of the Turkish Nationalist government, has caused all of the trouble, by ordering that all Christians evacuate Turkey. Armenians in thousands who were living in Turkey have been forced to move. They did not have time to sell their land, their goods, or to realize on any of the products of their work, but had to leave when the order was first issued. They could not even retain ownership of their homes, because it is a law in Turkey when a person once leaves Turkey the land and home become the property of the government.

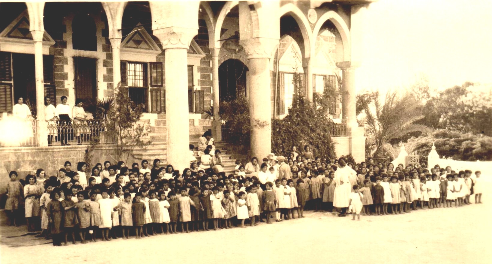
The Bird's Nest Orphanage with hundreds of children gathered in front. Miller-Mann provided relief to many of the children in this orphanage.

While in Beirut, Miller-Mann went beyond her duties as a secretary and assisted as many orphans as possible in the surrounding area. The orphans by this time had reached an estimated 130,000. Throughout this period, Mann kept a diary where she wrote extensively about the plight of the orphans and her service to various orphanages. She notes that when many of the orphaned children arrived in Syria, they were placed in one of the 18 or 20 orphanages in the vicinity, where they were fed, clothed, given medical care and given a vocational education.

Miller-Mann first worked with the orphanage of Antilyas, which, as she noted in a December 6, 1921, entry of her diary, was filled with Armenian orphaned girls:

The girls at Antilyas are all Armenian refugees, who were driven from their homes by the Turks and made to walk and walk and walk, they knew no where, and they got lost or separated from their mothers or their mothers died and then they were found and put into the orphanage.

Nellie Miller-Mann was instrumental in helping Danish missionary Maria Jacobsen with her orphanage called "The Bird's Nest". In January 1922, Jacobsen transferred many orphans to Beirut. After moving to Zouk Michail in July 1922, she established an orphanage which sheltered 208 Armenian children from Cilicia. Through the efforts of the Danish missionary, an Armenian orphanage that had previously been owned by the Near East Relief was acquired by The Women's Missionary Workers (K.M.A.) in 1928. The orphanage, which was located in Byblos, became known as the "Bird's Nest" and was to eventually help 400 orphaned children who were aged from infants to up to nine years old. In January 1922, while Jacobsen was occupied transferring the orphans to Beirut, Miller-Mann visited the orphanage when it was under Near East Relief supervision. At the time of her initial visit, she noted that there were 600 Armenian orphans stationed at the orphanage and that they arrived about a year ago from Marash (now Kahramanmaras) and Aintab (now Gaziantep).

While in the Middle-East, Miller-Mann toured the region and visited several sites including Baalbeck, Damascus, and Aleppo.

Miller-Mann continued assisting the orphaned refugees until retired from her tours of duty in 1923.

== Ministry ==
Nellie Miller married to Cleo Mann on August 25, 1924. She eventually taught at a local Sunday school. Cleo and Nellie Mann moved to Indianapolis where they were instrumental in the founding of the first Mennonite church in the city.

She died on February 2, 1997, at the age of 99 in Goshen, Indiana.

== Legacy ==
Upon her return to the United States, Nellie Miller Mann was awarded the Near East Relief Service medal by the national field director of the Near East Foundation for her significant contributions to the Foundation and the relief effort.

Her writings and photographs have been recently published in a 226-page book entitled Letters from Syria 1921-1923: A Response to the Armenian Tragedy, Including Stories, Travel and Reports.
