= Ry, Denmark =

Ry
- Town
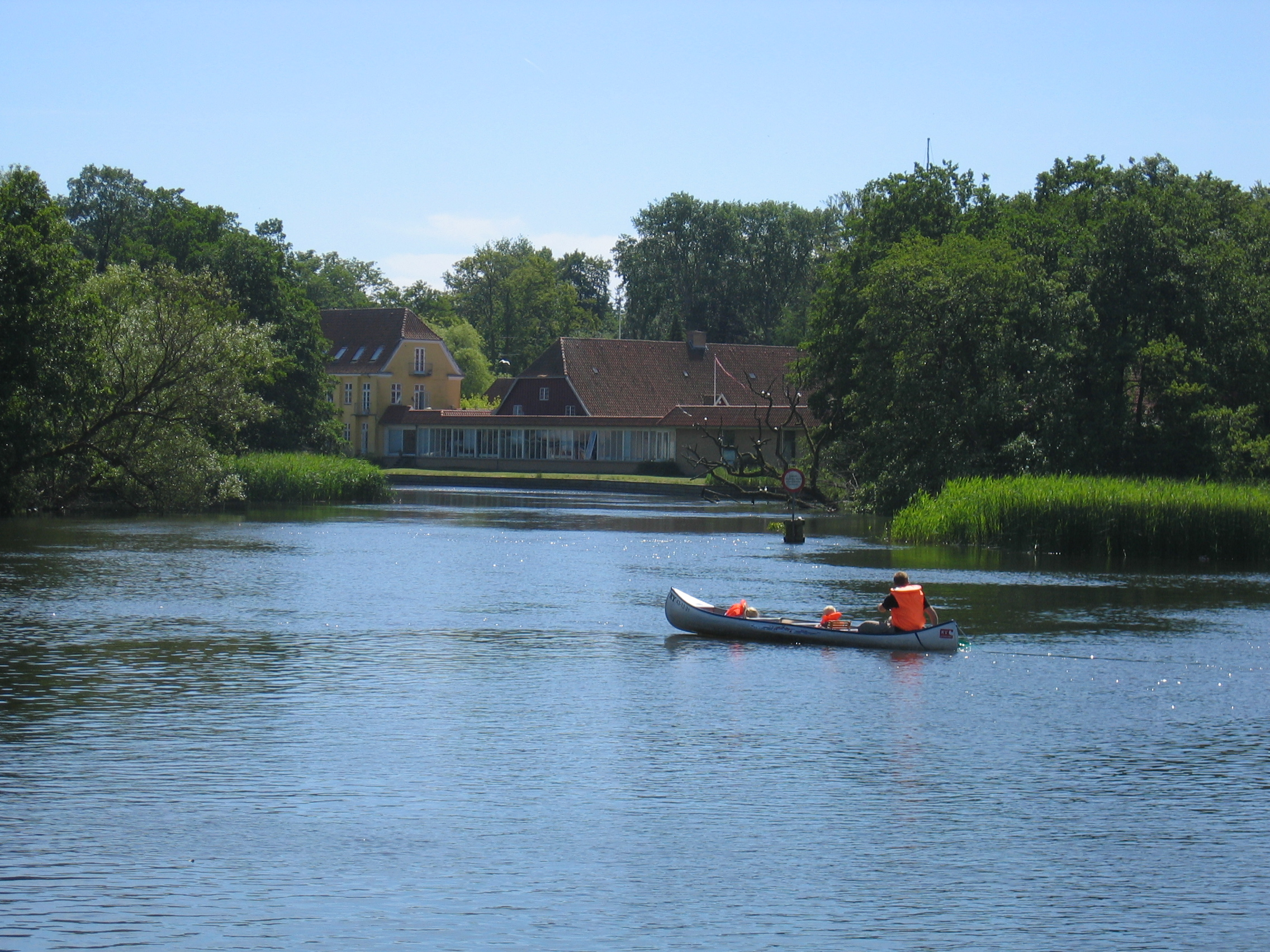
- Lillesø seen from Ry Marina

- Coat of arms

- Location in Denmark Ry (Central Denmark Region)
- Coordinates: 56°05′32″N 09°45′29″E
- Country: Denmark
- Region: Central Denmark (Midtjylland)
- Municipality: Skanderborg

Area
  - Urban: 4.3 km^{2} (1.7 sq mi)

Population (2026)
  - Urban: 7,750
  - Urban density: 1,800/km^{2} (4,700/sq mi)
  - Gender: 3,780 males and 3,970 females
- Time zone: UTC+1 (CET)
  - Summer (DST): UTC+2 (CEST)
- Postal code: DK-8680 Ry

Ry (Danish: [ˈʁyˀ]) is a town with a population of 7,750 (1 January 2026) in central Denmark, located in Skanderborg municipality in Jutland. The town sprouted up around a railway station 5 km east of the older town of Rye which is now much smaller than Ry.

== History ==
In 1879, the town was described as follows: "Ry with a church, parsonage, school, and inn."

Around the turn of the century, it was described as: "Rye (1401: Rydhæ, 1486: Ryde, 1495: Ryæ) with a church, parsonage, school, temperance home with assembly hall (built in 1899), savings bank (established in 1876; as of 31 March 1900, deposits totaled 33,948 kr. at 4% interest, reserve fund of 2,611 kr., and 323 accounts), inn, and telephone station." Likely compare the archaic Swedish word ryd, meaning "clearing", also the name of a few villages in Sweden.

== Geography ==
Ry is located along the Gudenå (River Guden) between the lakes Gudensø, Birkesø, Vessø, Lillesø, Rye Møllesø and Knudsø.

Ry is known for Himmelbjerget one of the highest natural points in the Danish landscape. It is 147 m (482 ft) high.

== Education ==
Ry continuation school has won the girls school football tournament in Denmark 2005 and 2006. In 2006 Gudenå School, Ry held Smallschool Festival with more than 1,500 participants.

== Notable people ==
- Pauline Thomsen (1858 – 1931 in Ry) a Danish painter and art teacher; lived in Ry
- Maria Jacobsen (1882 in Siim near Ry – 1960) a Danish missionary and a key witness to the Armenian genocide
- Anna Klindt Sørensen (1899 in Ry – 1985) a Danish painter and illustrator, a strong, self-assured women who practised French Expressionism
- Ebbe Nielsen (1950 in Ry – 2001) a Danish entomologist, influential in systematics and Lepidoptera research
- Peter Sommer (born 1974) a Danish singer and songwriter, lives in Ry
- Jette Hansen (born 1987 in Ry) a female former Danish handball player
- Lars Frederiksen & The Bastards (active years 2000–2005) an American street punk band, Lars Frederiksen lives in Ry
- Carsten Pedersen (Former cricket player) a male former cricket player for The Danish national team, lives in Ry
- Julie Scaglione (born 2004) Danish handball national team player
