= Map of Salvation =

- This is a poster for Map of Salvation.
- Directed by: Aram Shahbazyan
- Screenplay by: Anna Sargsyan
- Produced by: Manvel Saribekyan
- Narrated by: Svante Lundgren
- Cinematography: Arthur Gharayan
- Music by: Vig Zartman
- Production company: Man Pictures Production
- Release dates: 22 April 2015 (Yerevan, Armenia)
- Running time: 88 minutes
- Country: Armenia
- Language: English
- Budget: $ 380 000

Map of Salvation is a feature-length docudrama film made to commemorate the 100th anniversary of the Armenian genocide.

The film tells about five European women, Maria Jacobsen (Denmark), Karen Jeppe (Denmark), Bodil Biørn (Norway), Alma Johansson (Sweden), Anna Hedvig Büll (Estonia), who were witnesses to the Armenian Genocide and subsequently founded shelters for Armenian children and women.

Film production was in 29 cities of 9 countries.
