= Isaac Grout Bliss =

American missionary (1822–1889)

Isaac Grout Bliss (1822–1889) was a missionary and agent of the American Bible Society (ABS) in the Near East. He made the first of the Bible translations into Kurdish.

Bliss was born in Springfield, Massachusetts. He attended Andover and graduated from Amherst College in 1844. He married Eunice Day. Their son was missionary and author Edwin Munsell Bliss.
