= Bible translations into Kurdish =

Part of the Bible was first available in the Kurdish language in 1856. Modern translations of the whole Bible are available in standard Kurmanji and Sorani, with many portions in other dialects.

== Kurmanji ==
=== Early translations ===
Part of the Bible was first available in the Kurdish language in 1856 in the Kurmanji dialect. The Gospels were translated by Stepan, an Armenian employee of the American Bible Society and were published in 1857. Isaac Grout Bliss, of the ABS, translated the rest of the New Testament, and the entire NT was published in Istanbul by A.H. Bohajian in 1872 in the Armenian Alphabet.

A new translation of the New Testament and Psalms, still in Armenian script was published in 1891.

Another translation of the Gospel of Matthew in Arabic letters was published by the American Bible Society in 1922.

=== Kamiran Alî Bedirxan ===
Proverbs in 1947, and Luke in 1953 were prepared by Kamuran Alî Bedirxan with assistance from a Dominican priest Thomas Bois. Luke was published in both Arabic and Latin scripts. These were published by the Bible Society in Lebanon. This edition of Proverbs was republished in Istanbul in 2014 by Avesta.

=== Komela Hêvî û Jiyanê ===
Komela Hêvî û Jiyanê released a translation of the whole Bible as "Kitêba Pîroz". This was translated into Kurmanji Kurdish by Resûlê Qereqoçanî and Seîdê Dewrêş. It was first published in Germany in 2004 by GBV-Dillenburg, and laterin Turkey by GDK (Gerçeğe Doğru Kitapları).

=== Bible Society in Turkey ===
The Bible Society in Turkey published the New Testament in modern Kurmanji in 2005. The Psalms were added in a subsequent printing (2015). Since then, translation of Old Testament books has been continuing and translations that have been consultant-checked are uploaded to Bible.com (Also referred to as the YouVersion app). As of March 2021, 21 of the 39 books of the Old Testament are available for reading there. Audio readings of those books have been made available on SoundCloud to help oral learners, and to garner feedback on the translations for eventual printing of the whole Bible.

=== Institute for Bible Translation ===
Institute for Bible Translation is translating the Bible for Kurds in the post Soviet Union. The New Testament was completed in 2000 and a revised edition was released in 2011. There is ongoing work on the Old Testament. There work is published in both Cyrillic and Latin editions.

=== Kurdish Literature Association ===
Portions of the Bible have been translated into Behdini (Kurmanji of South Kurdistan): first John's Gospel, Luke/Acts and in 2019, the whole New Testament. This translation of the New Testament was completed by KLA (Kurdish Literature Association) and published by Biblica.

=== Jehovah's Witnesses ===
On July 2, 2023, The Bible—The Good News According to Matthew was released in two Kurdish languages at two separate events. In Germany, the book was released in Kurdish Kurmanji. It was also released in Kurdish Kurmanji (Caucasus) in Georgia. Approximately 750 people attended the events.

Since these events Jehovah's Witnesses have released several books of the New Testament digitally in Kurdish. The books released are Matthew thru Colossians.

=== Comparison of translations ===
Translation	John 3:16
American Bible Society (1857)	Զըմա քօ խօտէ վուսան հուպանտ տընէ, հաթա քօ եէքզա Գուռէ խօ տա, Քը հէր քի քօ ժէ ռա իման պինա վունտա նա պա, լէ ժը էպէտի հայաթ ռա մալիք պըպա :
American Bible Society (1857, 1872) (transliterated)	Çimkî Xwedê wusan heband dinyayê, heta ko yekza Kurê xwe da, ku her kê ko jê re îman bîne winda nebe, lê ji abadî heyat ra melik bibe.
Komela Hêvî û Jiyanê	Ji ber ku Xwedê evqas pirr ji dinê hez kir ku, Lawê xwe yê tekane da; wisa ku, bila tu kes, ji yên bawerî bi wî bîne helaq nebe, lê bila jiyana wî ya abadîn hebe.
Kitab-i Mukaddes şirketi (Bible Society in Turkey)	Çimkî Xwedê wusa ji dinyayê hez kir ku Kurê xwe yê yekta da, da her kesê ku baweriyê bi wî bîne helak nebe, lê jiyana wî ya herheyî hebe.
Institute for Bible Translation (cyrillic alphabet)	Чьмки Хwәде ӧса дьнйа һ'ьз кьр, кӧ Кӧр'еф хwәйи тайе т'әне бәрва да, wәки һәр кәсе кӧ wи баwәр бькә ӧнда нәбә, ле жийина wийә һ'әта-һ'әтайе һәбә.
Institute for Bible Translation (latin alphabet)	Çimkî Xwedê usa dinya h'iz kir, ku Kur'ê Xweyî tayê t'enê berva da, wekî her kesê ku bawerîya xwe Wî bîne unda nebe, lê jîyîna wîye h'eta-hetayê hebe.
Kurdish Literature Association, 2019	خودێ هۆسا حەز ژ جیهانێ كر، كو وی كوڕێ خۆ یێ ئێكانە دایێ، داكو هەر كەسێ باوەریێ پێ بینیت ژ ناڤ نەچیت، لێ ژیانا هەروهەر هەبیت.
Kurdish Literature Association, 2019 (transcribed)	Xwedê wusa hez ji cîhanê kir, ku wî Kurê xwe yê êkane dayê, da ku her kesê baweriyê pê bînît ji nav neçît, lê jiyana heruher hebît.
New World Translation	Xwedê ji dinyayê ew qas hez kir ku wî Kurê xweyî yekta da, da ku her kesê ku baweriya xwe bi wî tîne, helak nebe, lê jiyana herheyî bi dest bixe.

== Sorani ==
P. von Oertzen translated the New Testament into Mokri dialect of Sorani Kurdish. The gospel of Mark was published in Bulgaria in 1909 in Arabic letters and the rest of this translation was never published.

In 1919, Ludvig Olsen Fossum of the United Norwegian Lutheran Church of America finished the whole New Testament and it was published in Arabic script under the title Injil Muqqades.

Kurdish Sorani Standard Bible (KSS) is a recent translation of the complete Bible in Sorani Kurdish by Biblica (International Bible Society). It was released in Arabic script version in April 2017.

=== Comparison of translations ===
Translation	John 3:16
Fossum translation - Sorani (Mukri), 1919	چونکه خڵا دنيايی وھا حُباند که کوری تاقانی خوی دا ھتاکو ھر کس که به وی ايمان بينی ھلاك نبی بڵا ژيانی ابدي ببی.
IBS Modern - Sorani	چونكه‌ خودا به‌م جۆره‌ جیهانی خۆشویست، ته‌نانه‌ت كوڕه‌ تاقانه‌كه‌ی به‌ختكرد، تاكو هه‌ر كه‌سێك باوه‌ڕی پێ بهێنێت له‌ناو نه‌چێت، به‌ڵكو ژیانی تاهه‌تایی هه‌بێت.
Biblica - Kurdi Sorani Standard	لەبەر ئەوەی خودا ئەوەندە جیهانی خۆشویست، تەنانەت کوڕە تاقانەکەی بەختکرد، تاکوو هەرکەسێک باوەڕی پێ بهێنێت لەناو نەچێت، بەڵکوو ژیانی هەتاهەتاییی هەبێت،
Bible Society in Lebanon - Sorani, 2017	چونكه‌ خودا وه‌ها جیهانی خۆشویست، ته‌نانه‌ت ڕۆڵه‌ تاقانه‌كه‌ی به‌ختكرد، تاكو هه‌ر كه‌سێک باوه‌ڕی پێ بهێنێت له‌ناونه‌چێت، به‌ڵكو ژیانی جاویدانیی هه‌بێت.

== Zaza ==
The gospel of Luke has been translated into Zazaki Kurdish.

== Southern Kurdish ==
The gospel of John was translated into Kermanshahi Kurdish in 1894. It was translated by Yahya Khan Kirmanshahi from Persian. Later this translation was revised and the rest of the gospels were translated by W. Claire Tisdall and Mirza Ismail. This was published in 1900 by the British and Foreign Bible Society.

== See also ==
- Kurdish Christians
