= Zaruhi Bahri =

Zaruhi Shahbaz Bahri
- Զարուհի Շահբազ Պահրի
- Born: May 31, 1880; Constantinople, Ottoman Empire
- Died: May 13, 1958 (aged 77); Paris, France
- Resting place: Père Lachaise
- Known for: writer, social worker, and community activist
- Spouse: Hagop Bahri
- Children: Krikor, Zhirayr, Anahid, and Noyemi
- Relatives: Parsegh Shahbaz (brother)

Zaruhi Shahbaz Bahri (Armenian: Զարուհի Շահբազ Պահրի; 31 May 1880 – 13 May 1958) was a prominent Armenian writer, social worker, and community activist. In 1913, she was one of the founding members of the Armenian Red Cross of Constantinople. In the aftermath of the Armenian Genocide, and having lost several family members, Bahri remained in the Ottoman Empire to assist in the relief effort for those who survived the genocide. She eventually fled to Romania and ultimately to France in 1928 where she remained the rest of her life. While in France, she wrote six novels and continued to engage with the local Armenian community.

== Life ==
Zaruhi Shahbaz Bahri was born in Constantinople, Ottoman Empire on 31 May 1880 to a family of ethnic Armenians. She started to become active in the local Armenian community after the Adana massacre of 1909. She also taught Armenian orphans how to sew and embroider. During the Balkan Wars of 1912–13, she was instrumental in providing aid and assistance to ethnic Armenians that served the Ottoman army.

During the Armenian Genocide, Bahri lost several of her family members including her brother and sister. Her sister, Adrine, was deported from the town of Amasya and was ultimately killed. Her brother, Parsegh Shahbaz, a prominent member of the Armenian intellectual community of Constantinople and member of the Armenian Revolutionary Federation, was deported as part of the deportation of Armenian intellectuals on 24 April 1915 and was ultimately killed.

After the genocide, Bahri remained in Constantinople and assisted in the relief effort of those who survived given that many Armenians sought refuge in the capital after the deportations. Bahri eventually became the head of the Şişli branch of Armenian Red Cross in 1918. During this time, she also became a member of the Armenians Women's Association (AWA) and contributed to the Armenian Women's Journal called Hay Gin. At the request of the Armenian Patriarch of Constantinople, Bahri became the director of the Neutral House (Chezok Dun), an organization that was established to determine if surviving children of the genocide were Armenian or Turkish. Due to her involvement with the organization, Turkish authorities suspected her of "Armenianizing Turkish children". As a result, Bahri and her husband and four children fled to Romania where they believed they can easily return to Constantinople once tensions eased. However, they were denied reentry into the country and their assets and property were confiscated. Bahri and her family then moved to France. Her husband, Hagop Bahri, was a prominent lawyer but he couldn't find employment in Paris. Given the difficult financial situation, Bahri started to work as a seamstress and ultimately stopped sending articles to Hay Gin. However, she did continue to write on her own and managed to published several works including her memoirs.

She died in Paris on May 13, 1958, and was buried in Père Lachaise Cemetery. In accordance to her wishes, her children took her ashes to Armenia and buried them on the premises of Etchmiadzin Cathedral, the Mother Church of the Armenian Apostolic Church in 1987.

== Works ==
- Parantsem: Jampanerun Yergaynkin (Paris: Der Hagopian, 1946)
- Dakre: Vospori Aperun Vra 1875–1877 (Paris: Der Hagopian, 1941)
- Dayyan Kevork Bey gam Badriarkarani Poghotsin Pnagichnere: Vospori Aperun Vra 1895-1898 (Paris: Le Solei, 1952)
- Muygerun Dag (Beirut: Madensashar “Ayk,” 1956)
- Louisette ou Osmose (serialized in Aysor: 1952)
- Ambrob (serialized in Azad Khosk, Paris: 1940)
- Bahri also edited and wrote the introduction of the book that her son Gerard Bahri wrote, Vahan Maleziani Gyankn u Kordse: Hushamadyan Ir Utsunamyagin Artiv (1871-1951) (Paris: Le Solei, 1951)
