= Alma Johansson =

Swedish missionary (1880–1974)

- Born: Alma Viktoria Leontina Johansson; 29 October 1880; Stockholm, Sweden
- Died: 31 December 1974 (aged 94); Stockholm, Sweden
- Resting place: Skogskyrkogården
- Occupation: Missionary

Alma Viktoria Leontina Johansson (29 October 1880 – 31 December 1974) was a Swedish missionary who worked in the city of Mush in the Ottoman Empire at the beginning of the 20th century.

== Life ==
In 1901, the Missionary Society of Swedish women sent Johansson to Mush (Western Armenia), where she stayed until December 1915. There she worked for the German Hilfsbund-Orphanage for Armenian children. On the outbreak of World War I, the atrocities against the empire's Christian minorities escalated and she became an eyewitness to these crimes against humanity. She wrote about her experiences in a book called Ett folk i landsflykt: Ett år ur armeniernas historia ("A People in Exile: One Year in the Life of the Armenians", Stockholm: Kvinnliga missions arbetare, 1930), both of which were translated into Armenian and French.

She also made testimonies to German and American diplomats who published them later. Alma told about how women took poison so they would not be captured by the Turks, and how the soldiers transported bloody, wounded women and children through the city while other soldiers fired at them. When the wounded fell to the ground, the soldiers would hit them with the butt ends of their rifles. "I can never forget the sight. And nothing could you do for them!" she wrote. She gave information about how children at the orphanage were handed over to a Turkish officer, who then took them to a building outside the city where they all were executed.

In 1923 Johansson moved to Salonika, and established a factory for more than 200 Armenian refugee women. She also founded an Armenian kindergarten and primary school in Charilaos (Greece).

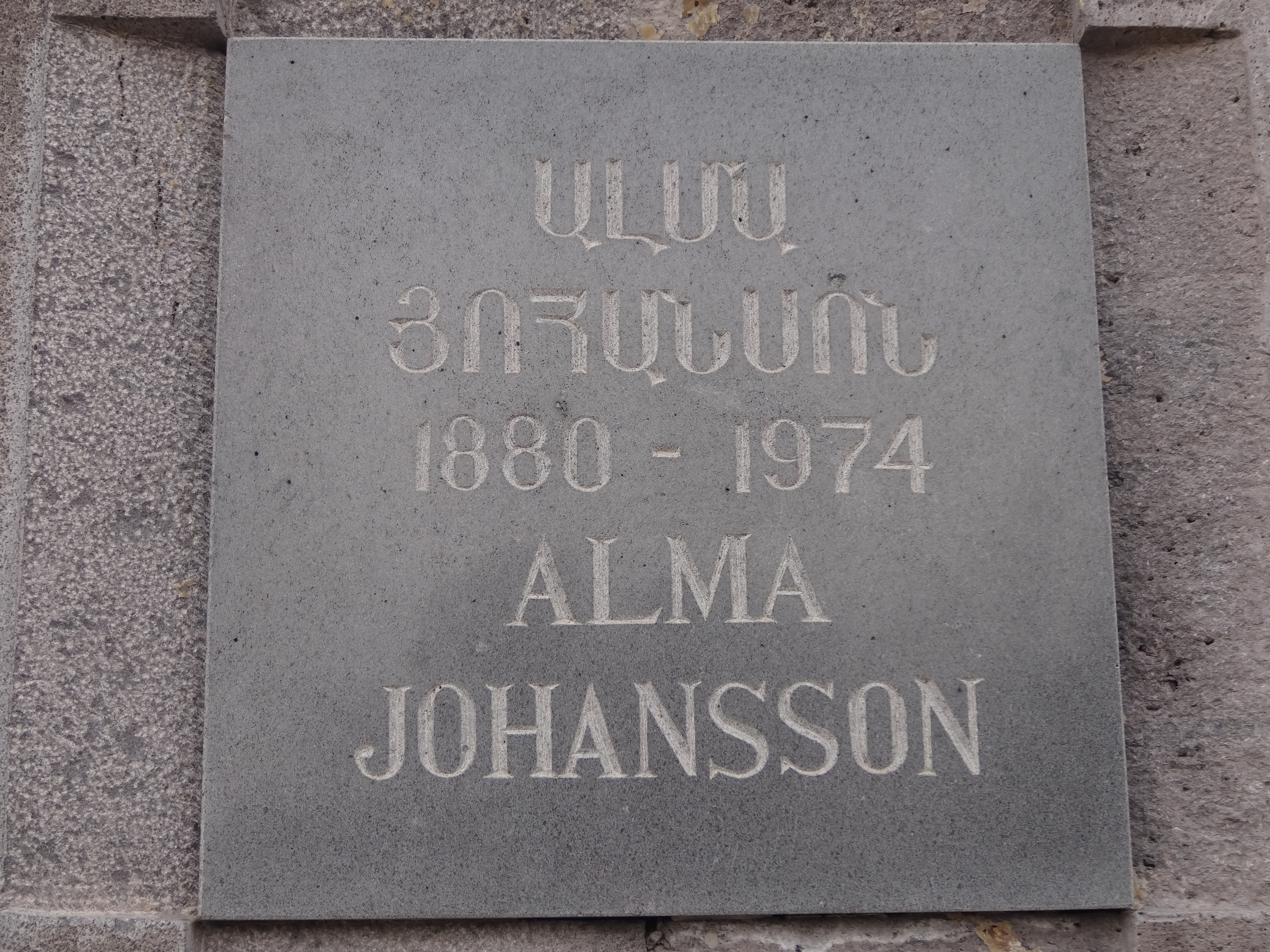
Plaque at Tsitsernakaberd for Alma Johansson (Yerevan, Armenia)

== Legacy ==
In 1997, the Johansson festival was organized in Yerevan.

In 2005, on the 90th anniversary of the Armenian genocide, a group of Swedish Armenians visited Alma Johansson's grave at Skogskyrkogården in Enskede, outside Stockholm, to remember these horrifying events and to honour her efforts. This commemoration has since then become a standing event and part of the annual commemoration program.

The film "Map of Salvation" (2015) tells about Johansson and four European humanist women's lives and activities.

== See also ==
- Witnesses and testimonies of the Armenian genocide

== Sources ==
- Artsvi Bakhchinyan, Armenia-Sweden: Historical and cultural relations, Yerevan, 2006, pp. 102–103
- Amalia Lange, Ett blad ur Armeniens historia, Stockholm, 1920, pp. 31–34
- http://www.azad-hye.com/nuke/modules.php?name=News&file=article&sid=173
