= Ludvig Olsen Fossum =

Norwegian-born American Lutheran missionary and Kurdologist (1879–1920)

Ludvig Olsen Fossum (1879–1920) was a Norwegian-born American Lutheran missionary, linguist, translator and Kurdologist. He worked principally among the Kurds of north-western Iran, especially around Sauj Bulāq (modern Mahabad), and is regarded as one of the pioneers of modern Kurdish linguistic studies.

== Early life ==
Fossum was born in Norway in 1879 and later emigrated to the United States. He entered the Lutheran ministry and was appointed as a missionary to Persia, where he served among the Kurdish population of north-western Iran.

== Missionary work ==
Fossum was stationed primarily at Sauj Bulāq (now Mahabad). In addition to evangelistic work, he established schools, undertook relief work and devoted considerable effort to learning the Kurdish language and culture.

During the First World War he wrote extensively on conditions affecting the Kurdish population and contributed reports to missionary periodicals.

== Death ==
Fossum died in 1920 at the age of 41. Contemporary medical opinion attributed his death to heart failure, although later accounts have noted that the circumstances were not fully clarified and no autopsy was performed.

== Contributions to Kurdish studies ==
Fossum is best remembered for his work on the Mukri dialect of Kurdish. His A Practical Kurdish Grammar (1919) was among the earliest modern grammars written by a fluent European speaker of Kurdish and became an important reference for later scholars.

He also translated the New Testament, Luther's Small Catechism, hymns and other Christian literature into Kurdish, and compiled educational materials for Kurdish readers.

Fossum served as a contributor to The Kurdistan Missionary, a periodical devoted to the work of the mission and to Kurdish language, history and society. Modern scholarship has highlighted his importance both as a missionary and as an early recorder of Kurdish language and culture.

== Selected publications ==
- A Practical Kurdish Grammar (1919)
- The War-Stricken Kurds (1918)
- Mukri Sorani Kurdish translation of the New Testament (1919)
- Kurdish translation of Luther's Small Catechism

== Legacy ==
Fossum is regarded as one of the principal missionary contributors to early Kurdish studies. Together with figures such as Samuel Audley Rhea and Roger Cumberland, he praised the profile of the Kurdish people through his missionary reports. He also helped lay the foundations for the modern academic study of the Kurdish language.
