= Anna Hedvig Büll =

Estonian missionary (1887-1981)

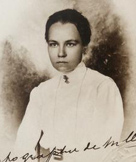
Anna Hedvig Büll in 1916

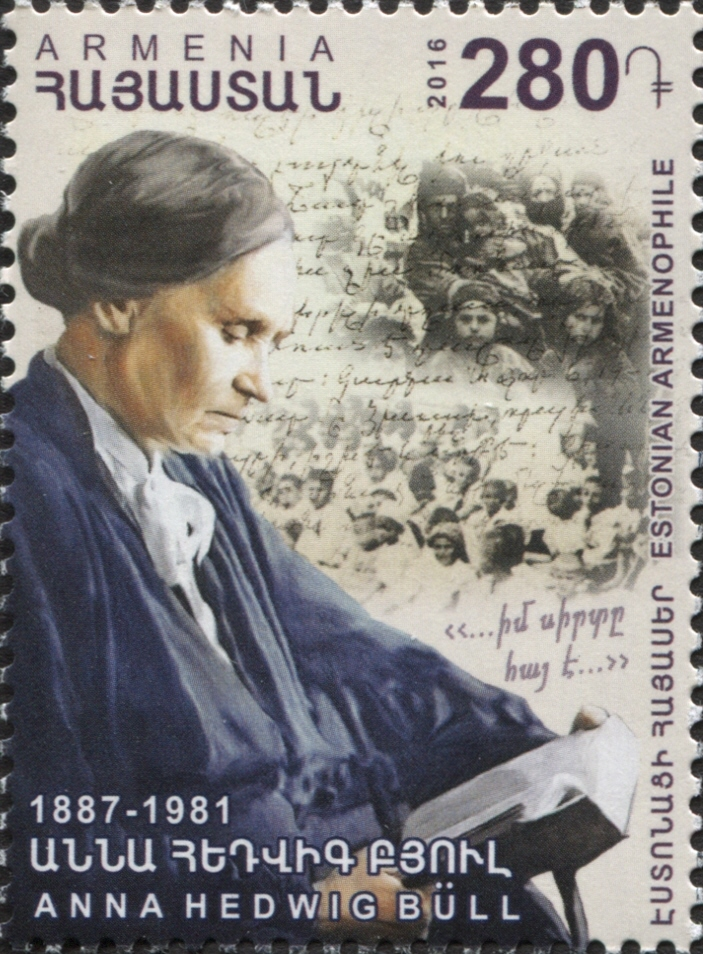
Anna Hedvig Büll on a 2016 stamp of Armenia

Anna Hedvig Büll (born Anna Hedwig Bühl, 4 February [O.S. 23 January] 1887 – 3 October 1981) was a missionary from Estonia who helped to save the lives of several thousand Armenian orphans during the Armenian genocide.

Anna Hedwig Büll (Bühl) was born into a Baltic German Lutheran family in 1887 in Haapsalu (Hapsal), Estonia, then part of the former Russian Empire. Her father owned a mud cure resort in Haapsalu. She was the sixth of eight brothers and sisters. Büll attended a local public school in until age 15. Büll then continued her studies in Saint Petersburg, where for three years she attended a Lutheran German school. While visiting her family in Haapsalu in 1903, inspired by a lecture given by a prominent evangelist Johann Kargel in her father's house, she decided to dedicate her life to work on humanitarian missions.

After receiving her baccalaureate in 1903, Büll spent some time at the Mission House Malche (in Bad Freienwalde, Germany) where she learned about the fate of Armenians in the Ottoman Empire. Motivated by her desire to work among the Armenian people, she continued her studies at an evangelical school. Soon she was invited to work at an Armenian mission station in Maraş. However, due to her youth she was first sent to work with women and children in German villages and then for a few months with the poor in Saint Petersburg.

In 1909, Büll again attempted to go to work with Armenians. However, this time her trip was put on hold by the Adana massacre in Cilicia. Instead, Büll attended for two years a seminary for missionary teachers. After finishing her studies, Büll was finally able to proceed for Cilicia, where she worked as a teacher at an Armenian orphanage in Maraş between 1911 and 1916. In 1915, Büll witnessed the Armenian genocide in Cilicia and was instrumental in saving the lives of about two thousand Armenian children and women when Maraş was turned into "The City of Orphans". Büll was recalled from Maraş in 1916.

In 1921, after a long sojourn in Austria to look after an ailing aunt, Büll returned to Estonia to take care of domestic matters and claim citizenship of the newly independent country. Later in 1921, Büll was sent by the newly founded Action Chrétienne en Orient to Aleppo, Syria, where she established a refugee camp for the survivors of the Armenian genocide. She also organized medical help for plague victims and the construction of two hospitals. Büll organized the establishment of weaving shops, gardens, an Armenian language school, and other enterprises to better the lives of the refugees.

In 1951, when most of the refugees under her care repatriated to Soviet Armenia, Büll was refused a visa by the Soviet authorities. She was also denied permission to return to her native Estonia that had in the meanwhile been occupied by the USSR. Having become a refugee herself, Büll relocated to Europe and continued her charitable work in France, Switzerland, and Germany, where she lived out the rest of her life without ever relinquishing her Estonian citizenship.

Büll died at a nursing home for missionaries on 3 October 1981, near Heidelberg, Germany, after having spent more than 40 years of her life for the betterment of lives of Armenian refugees. On 29 April 1989, a memorial tablet was dedicated for her by the Armenian-Estonian Cultural Society on her birth house in Haapsalu, Kooli Street 5. Her memory is also preserved by a monument in Armenia and at the Armenian Genocide Museum in Yerevan. Among the refugees she helped to save and in Armenia she is sometimes referred to as the Mother of Armenians.

The lives of Anna Hedvig Büll and four other female humanists from Europe, who bore witness to the Armenian genocide, are told in the 2015 film Map of Salvation.

== See also ==
- Witnesses and testimonies of the Armenian genocide
