= Pauline Thomsen =

Danish painter and art teacher (1858–1931)

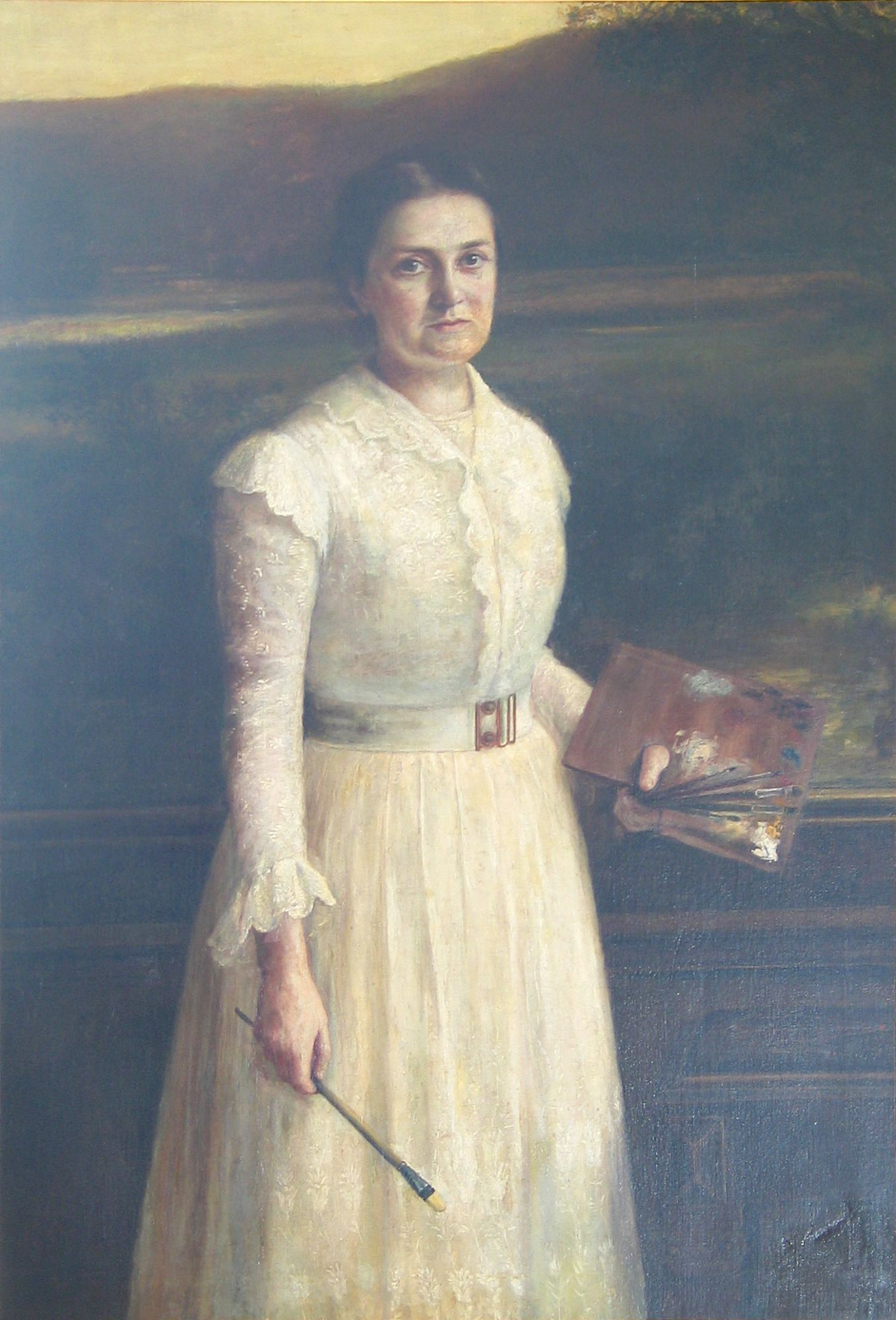
- "Portrait of Pauline Thomsen" by Ane Marie Hansen
- Born: Pauline Marthea Georgine Bergstrøm Thomsen; 17 July 1858; Roskilde, Denmark
- Died: 16 April 1931 (aged 72); Ry, Skanderborg, Jutland
- Occupations: Painter, art teacher
- Known for: Landscapes, portraits
- Parents: Christen Thomsen (father); Pauline Mathea Georgine Bergstrøm (mother)

Pauline Marthea Georgine Bergstrøm Thomsen (17 July 1858 – 16 April 1931) was a Danish landscape painter and art teacher.

== Biography ==
Born on 17 July 1858 in Roskilde, Denmark, Pauline Thomsen was the daughter of the lecturer Christen Thomsen (1822–1874) and Pauline Mathea Georgine Bergstrøm (1831–1896). From 1877 to 1880 Thomsen attended Vilhelm Kyhn's art school in Copenhagen as the Royal Danish Academy of Fine Arts did not admit women until 1888. She adopted his Romantic approach in the landscapes she painted first in Zealand and later together with Kyhn's former students in the area around Ry and Himmelbjerget in Jutland. Her landscapes seldom include figures but often have striking groups of trees. Like Kyhn, she gave the sky and cloud formations an important place in her paintings. Her few portraits are mainly pen-and-ink or charcoal drawings.

She exhibited at Charlottenborg Spring Exhibition from 1885 to 1931 and at Kunstnernes Efterårsudstilling in 1905 and 1907. In 1895, she exhibited in Chicago and in 1900 in Paris at the World Exhibition. Thomsen died aged 72 on 16 April 1931 in Ry, near Skanderborg.

== Gallery ==
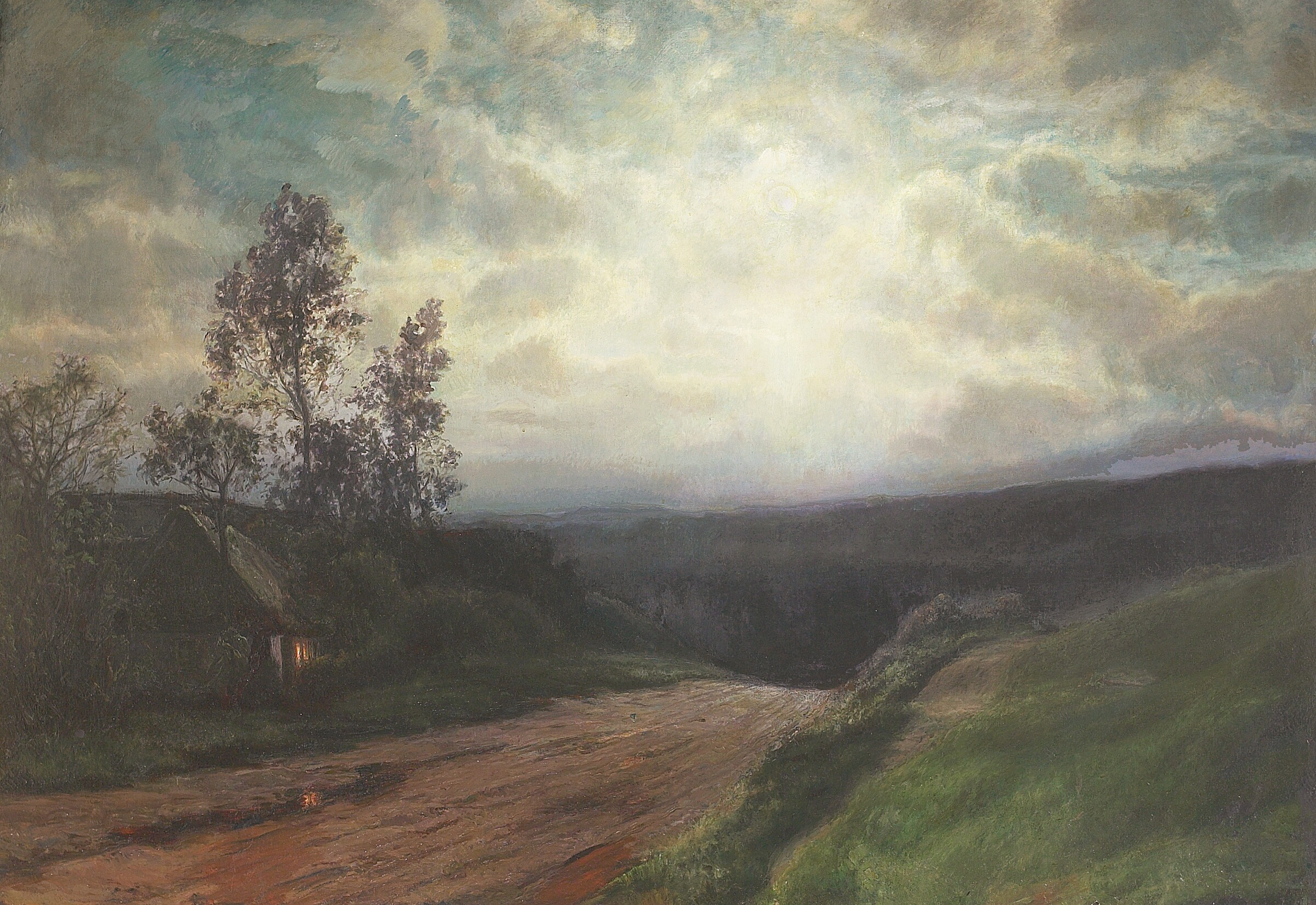
Aften ved Ry, oil on canvas, 1898

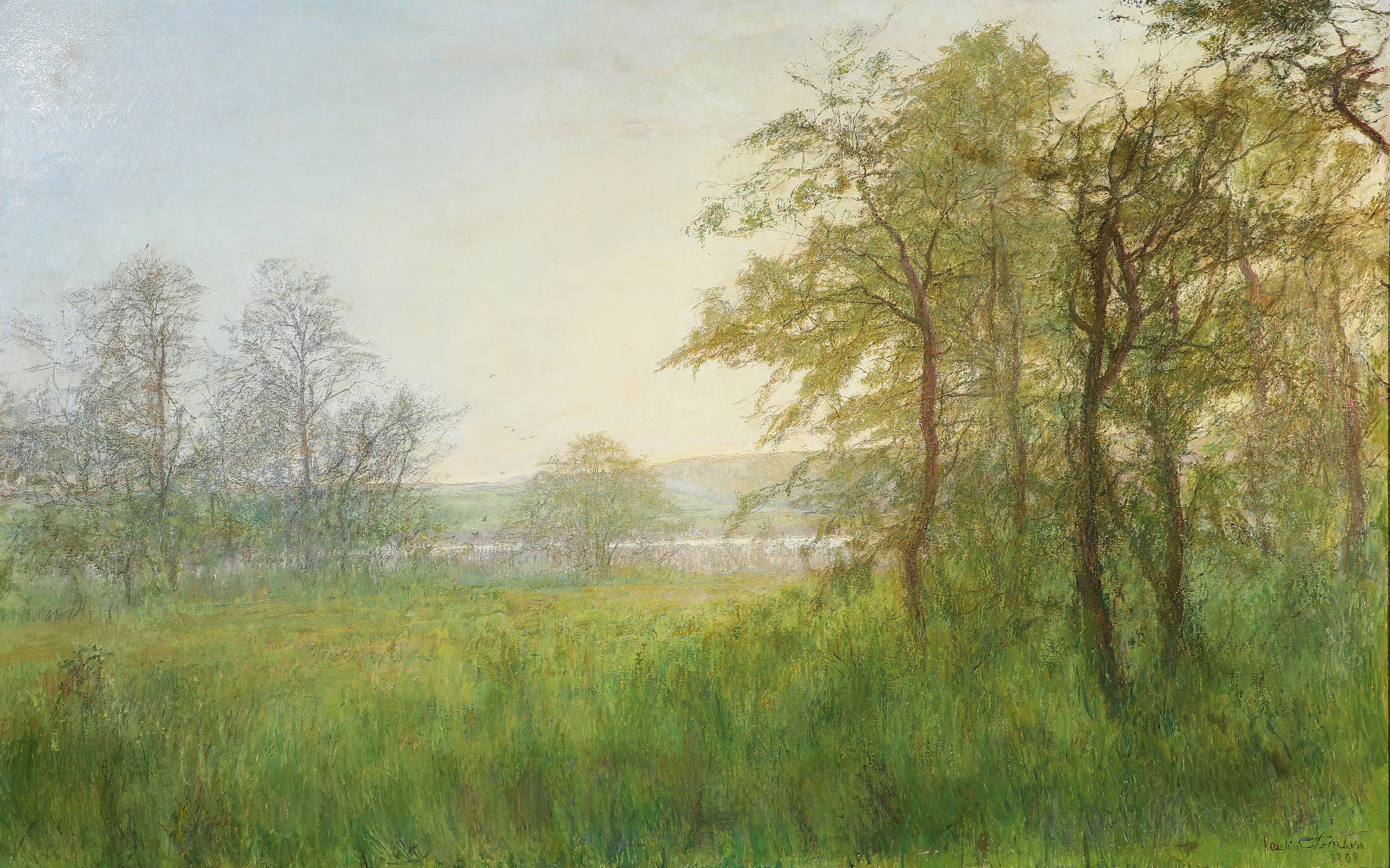
Landskab, en tidlig morgen, oil on canvas, 1908

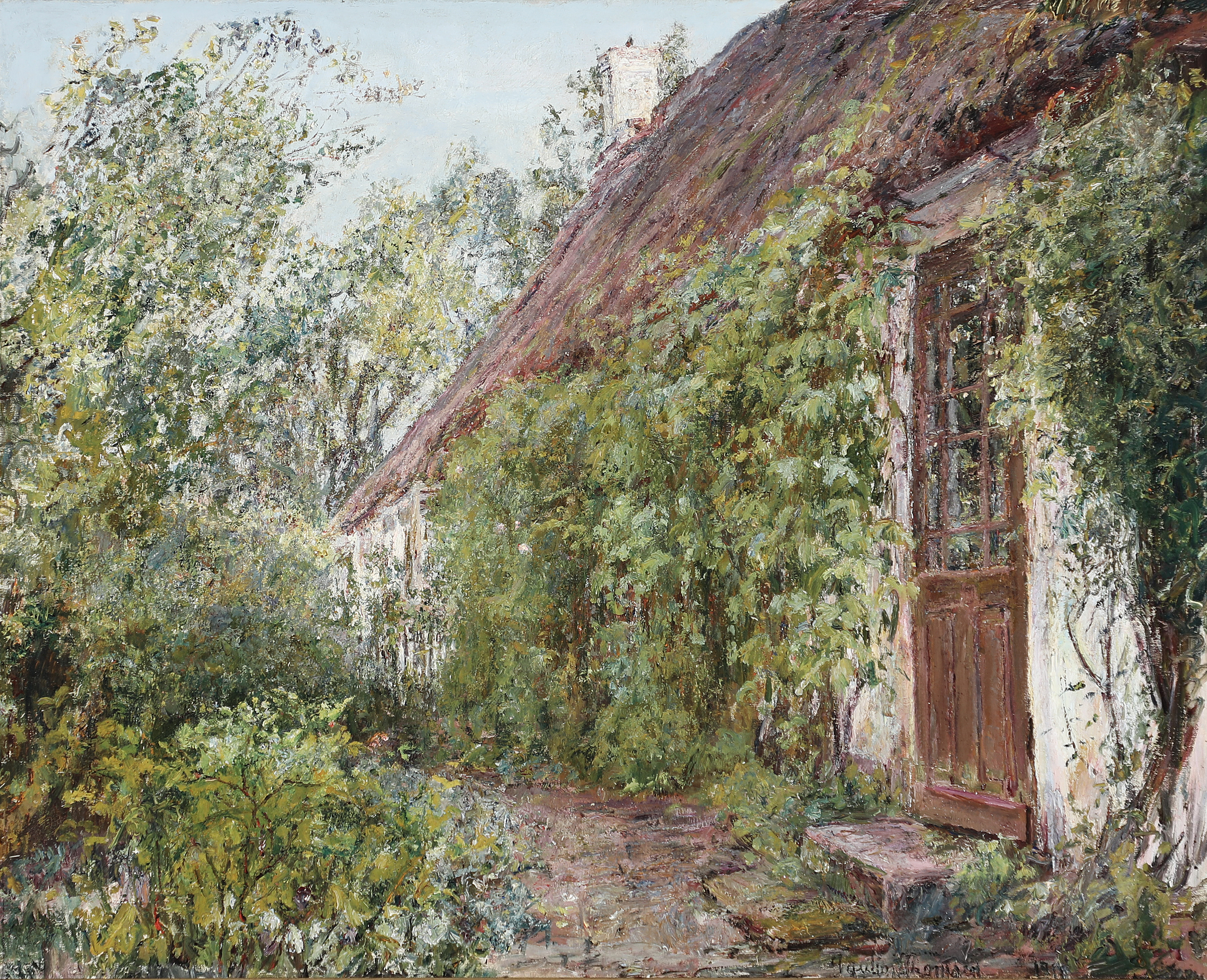
Skygge i præstegaardshaven, oil on canvas, 1911

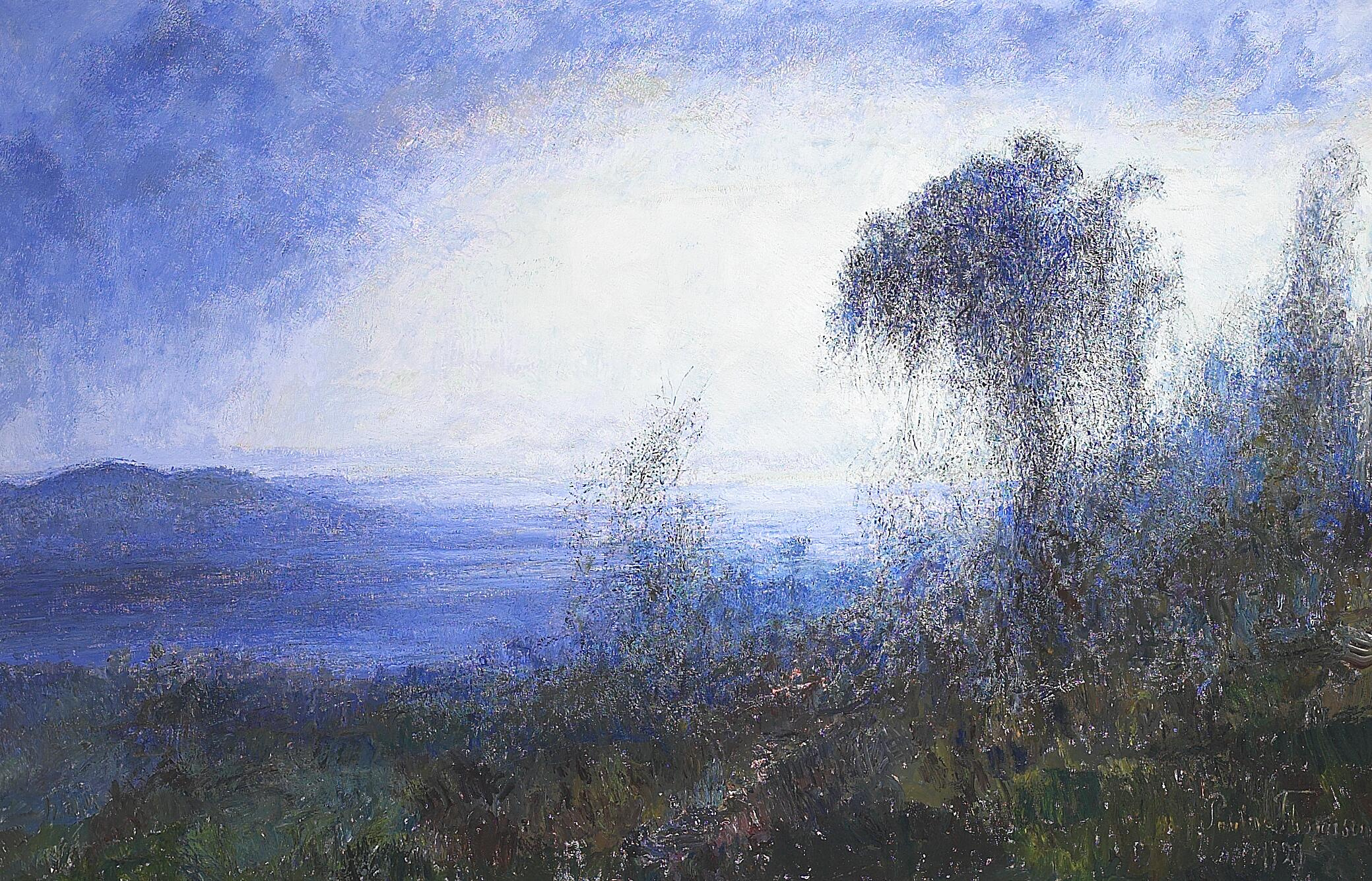
Sommerens farvel til efteråret, oil on canvas, 1929

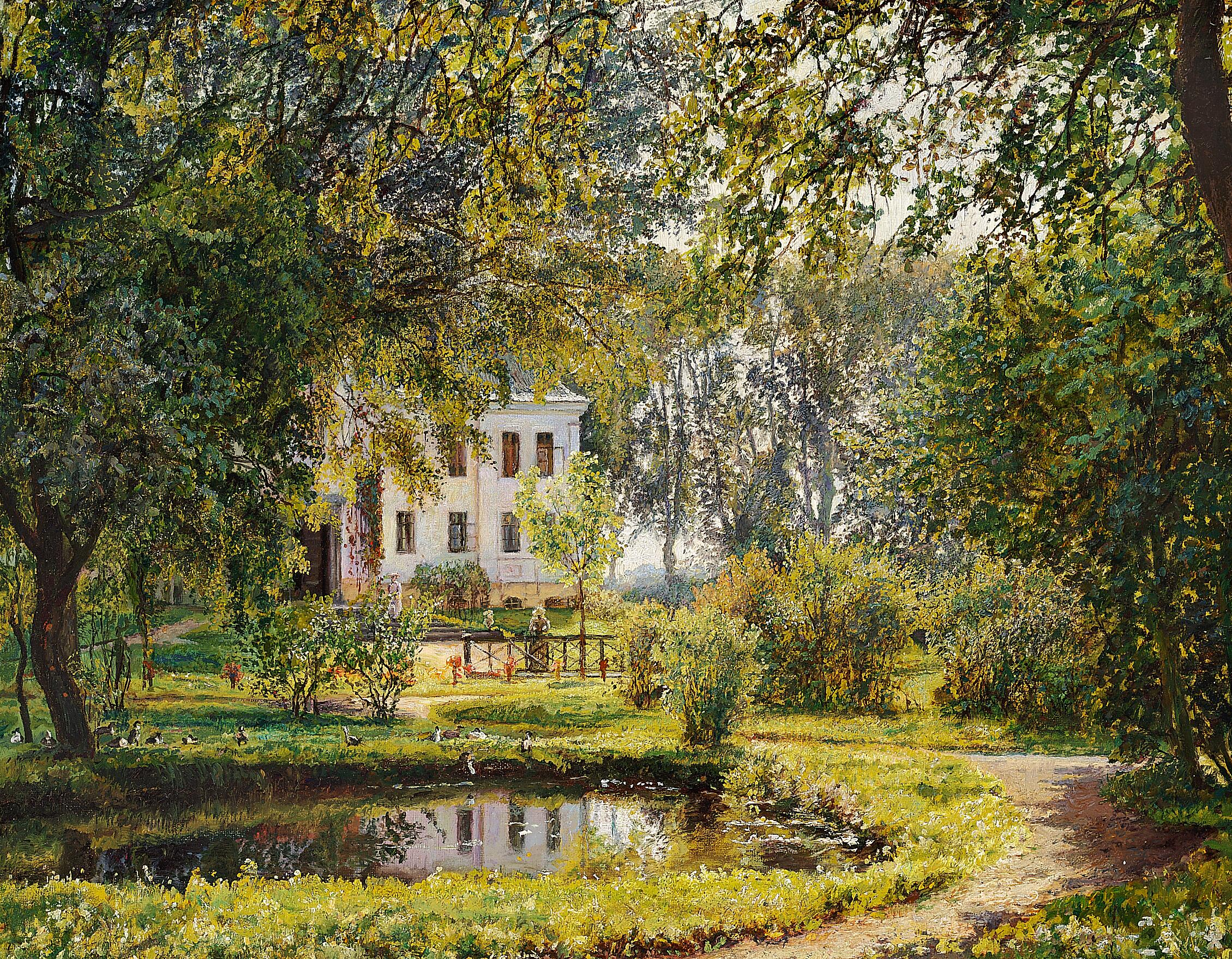
Landstedet Bisholm, oil on canvas
