= Edwin Munsell Bliss =

American Congregationalist Christian missionary and author (1848–1919)

- Born: 12 September 1848; Erzurum, Turkey
- Died: 6 August 1919 (aged 70); Washington, D.C., United States
- Education: Amherst College; Yale Divinity School
- Occupation: missionary
- Spouse(s): Marie Louise Henderson (died); E. Theodora Crosby
- Parents: Isaac Grout Bliss (father); Eunice Day (mother)

Edwin Munsell Bliss (September 12, 1848 – August 6, 1919) was an American Congregationalist Christian missionary and author.

== Life ==
Edwin Munsell Bliss was born in 1848, in Erzurum (then part of the Ottoman Empire). His father, Isaac Grout Bliss, was a missionary of the American Bible Society, known for making the first Kurdish-language translation of the Bible. His mother was Eunice (née Day) Bliss.

Bliss received his BA from Amherst in 1871, and later graduated from Yale Divinity School. He was ordained a minister. He was married twice: first to Marie Louise Henderson and, after her death, to E. Theodora Crosby.

Bliss served in various capacities for governmental organizations and overseas missionary societies. From 1872 to 1888 he worked for the American Bible Society in the Middle East. Between 1891 and 1901 he wrote for The Independent, a New York–based Congregationalist weekly newspaper; circa 1896 his position there was "assistant editor."

Bliss published a two-volume Encyclopedia of Missions in 1891. In 1896 he wrote a book denouncing the Ottoman massacres of the Armenians titled Turkey and the Armenian Atrocities.

He died in Washington, D.C. in 1919.

His personal papers are held by the archives of Yale University. The collection includes essays on Biblical history and his travels in the Near East; journals of an 1879 trip through Mesopotamia, Georgia, and Persia; journals of an undated trip from Alexandria to "Khanakhi" (Al Khankah?); Bliss's personal correspondence (1873–1883); and journals pertaining to his parents' travels in Turkey (1847, 1850).

== Works ==
- With Henry Otis Dwight and H. Allen Tupper: The Encyclopædia of Missions. Two volumes. New York: Funk & Wagnalls, 1891. (Second edition, 1904; 851 pages.)
- With Cyrus Hamlin, E. A. Grosvenor, et al.: Turkey and the Armenian atrocities. Introduction by Frances E. Willard. Edgewood Publishing Company, 1896. 574 pages.
- A concise history of missions. New York: Revell, 1897.
- The missionary enterprise: a concise history of its objects, methods and extension. New York: Revell, 1908.
