= Maria Jacobsen =

Danish missionary (1882–1960)

- Մարիա Ճէյքըպսըն; Մարիա Յակոբսեն
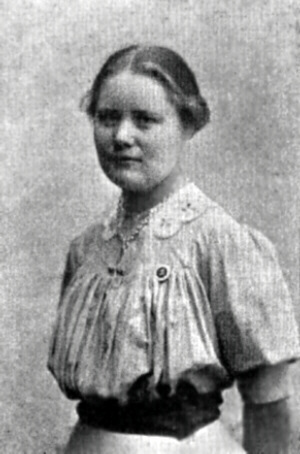
- Maria Jacobsen in 1910
- Born: 6 November 1882; Siim (present-day, Ry), Skanderborg Municipality, Denmark
- Died: 6 April 1960 (aged 77); Byblos, Mount Lebanon Governorate, Lebanon
- Other names: Mama (Western Armenian: Մամա, romanized: Mayrik)
- Occupations: Missionary; aid worker; nurse
- Known for: Witness to the Armenian genocide
- Children: 3
- Writing career
- Notable works: Diaries of a Danish Missionary: Harpoot, 1907–1919
- Notable awards: Royal Medal of Recompense, 1950; Gold Medal of Honor (Lebanon), 1954

Maria Jacobsen (Western Armenian: Մարիա Ճէյքըպսըն, Armenian: Մարիա Յակոբսեն; 1882 – 1960) was a Danish missionary, aid worker, nurse and a key witness to the Armenian genocide. Jacobsen wrote the Diaries of a Danish Missionary: Harpoot, 1907–1919, which according to Armenian genocide scholar Ara Sarafian, is "documentation of the utmost significance" for research of the Armenian genocide. Jacobsen is known as ″Mama″ (Western Armenian: Մամա, romanized: Mayrik) for her humanitarian efforts and having saved many Armenians during the genocide.

== Early life ==
Maria Jacobsen was born in the then village of Siim, Denmark (present-day, Ry) on the 6 November 1882 and as a child, she lived in Horsens with her father Jens Jacobsen and mother Ane Kristine Pedersen. At an early age, Jacobsen had learned about the massacres of Armenians during the Hamidian massacres from the Danish media. Christian organizations throughout the world started a campaign to express their solidarity with the Armenians and to serve to help them. When Jessie Penn-Lewis, a feminist activist, came to Denmark from England in 1898, she helped form the Women's Missionary Workers (K.M.A.; Danish: Kvindelige Missions Arbejdere) in 1900. Jacobsen soon participated in the support and relief efforts of orphans in the eastern provinces of the Ottoman Empire.

== Armenian genocide ==
When Maria Jacobsen arrived in Kharpert, she immediately started working in the American hospital located in the area.

In a diary entry regarding the deportation of Armenians, on 26 June 1915, Jacobsen stated that, "it is quite obvious that the purpose of their departure is the extermination of the Armenian people." She added:

Conditions now are completely different from what they were during the massacres of 20 years ago. What could be done then is impossible now. The Turks know very well about the war raging in Europe, and that the Christian nations are too busy to take care of Armenians, so they take advantage of the times to destroy their "enemies"

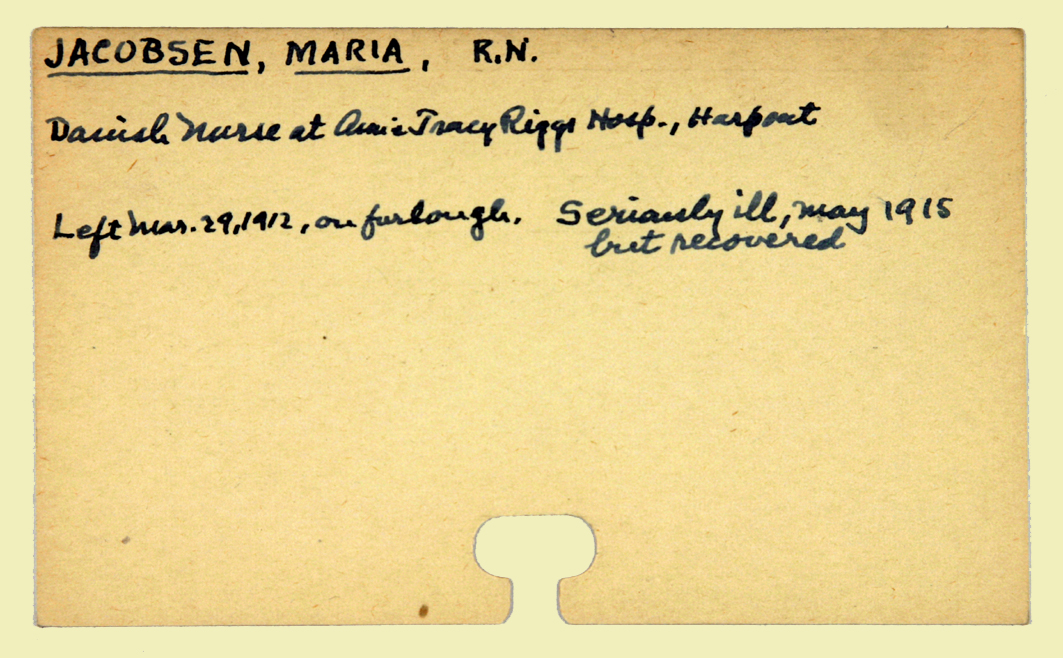
Personnel card of Maria Jacobsen

Jacobsen also stated in her diaries that Turkish soldiers told her and other Danish missionaries, "Why do you give money and food to these people? They are only going out to the mountains to be killed."

On July 6, Maria Jacobsen and Danish missionary Tacy Atkinson reported that 800 of the males thirteen years and older who were arrested were "massacred" in a gorge. Jacobsen then wrote about males over the age of nine who were taken to a mosque under the guardianship of "Kurds and gendarmes" who returned with their clothes covered with blood.

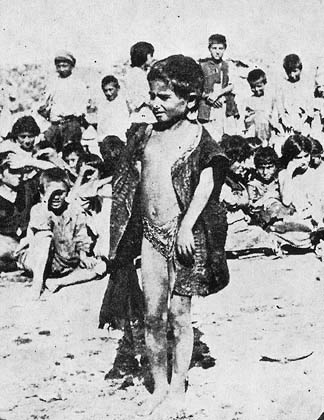
An Armenian child waiting before his admission to the orphanage

Jacobsen described the situation of the Armenian orphans and the famine throughout the city:

We lived this way for a year in fear that all the children would die of hunger. Each day new groups of children stood in front of my door asking for help, but what more could I do? I had nothing more to give them. One day a 13-year-old boy stood out among a starved group of children that came to me. His belly was not swollen up with hunger as others so I told him; there are many in worse condition than you who need help. Yours is the least serious, that's why I am sorry, I can not take you in. The same evening when I came to our kitchen's fireplace, my eyes caught a child lying crumpled on the warm ashes. It was the boy I sent away the previous day. He had died of hunger. That day I thought I would never be able to smile again. Each day we found ten to fifteen children that had died of famine.

Jacobsen later wrote about the circumstances of the deportees stating that 'these poor people did not look like humans any more, not even animals could be found in this state, people would be merciful and kill them'.

Serving as part of the Danish missionary, Jacobsen had taken thousands of children under her care and hid them from Turks. She was known for taking care of an orphan that was a survivor of a group of orphans that were killed when thrown into a river. Jacobsen reported that the Turkish authorities demanded from the American missionaries to hand over the orphans, however, when this happened, many of them were killed.

Jacobsen also remarked about the Norwegian and Scandinavian media during the genocide:

Today I went down to Mezreh and visited Sister Bodil (Biørn), together with Karen-Marie and some Turkish sisters. There we saw an account of the great Turkish blood bath of the Armenians in a Norwegian newspaper from September 30th. We were glad to see this. If they know about this in Norway, they must also know in Denmark and can follow us better in thought and prayer. This we need in these distressing times that the friends at home share in our suffering and carry us forward to the Mercy Seat.

It was during this period that Jacobsen adopted three children. The first, Hansa, had fled the Bedouin family she was sold into and hid in a tree until she became unconscious from sickness and fell, where a Turk police officer and Jacobsen found her. Jacobsen chose to adopt her on the spot. The second child was Beatrice, and the third was Lilly, who she had found on the side of the road.

In April 1919 humanitarian supplies and personnel were finally allowed by authorities into the interior of Turkey. Lee Vrooman, 21, the driver of one of the supply trucks that delivered goods to Harpoot, was so impressed by Jacobsen, now 36, that he wrote to his mother about her.

When she started she had absolutely nothing to work with, except American financial backing and her nerve. She could not get food enough this way, so, though she knew nothing of farming, she rented a farm and had her orphans raise much of their own foodstuffs. She could get no cloth, so she bought wool and had the girls knit garments. But of course they were not satisfactory for underclothes, so she rigged up a little cotton mill, bought cotton, and made cloth. She also made her own shoes, and of course had to grind her own flour.

He went on at great length, finally concluding, “Believe me, she did a wonderful work, and she is just a youngster herself.” What he may not have known was that during these four-and-a-half years, Jacobsen had also suffered for six months from typhus fever and cerebrospinal meningitis.

== Later life ==
Maria Jacobsen in 1960

Maria Jacobsen was busy administrating and could not be a 'mayrik.' She was the captain. Maria Jacobsen was elegant, but not fashionable, never went out without a hat. She was a nice lady. A good lady with a strong and honourable personality. We respected her. At times she was nervous, or perhaps it's called energetic, but we respected her. We did not see her everyday; she sat among us for the Sunday dinner, making sure we all got a fair helping of boiled potatoes and pork belly.

— Anne Stamboulian, an orphan under Jacobsen

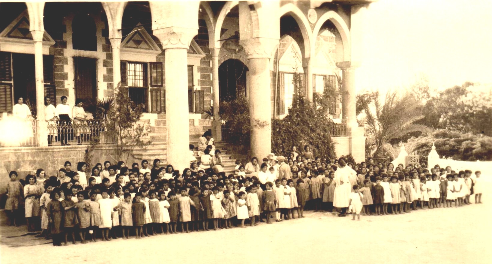
Bird's Nest Orphanage with hundreds of orphans gathered in front of it

After World War I, Maria Jacobson left the Ottoman Empire after contracting typhus from the orphans. After going to her native Denmark, she went to the United States where she gave a series of lectures and speeches on the plight of the Armenian people and the massacres that they have been subjected to. In the seven months that she spent in the United States, she managed to raise money for the orphans. After being prohibited from entering Turkey, Jacobsen subsequently went to Beirut, Lebanon where she continued to care for the orphans.

In January 1922, after the Armenian genocide, Jacobsen transferred many orphans to Beirut. After moving to Zouk Michail in July 1922, she helped establish an orphanage which sheltered 208 Armenian children from the region of Cilicia. Through the efforts of the Danish missionary, an Armenian orphanage that had previously been owned by the Near East Foundation was acquired by The Women's Missionary Workers (K.M.A.) in 1928. The orphanage, which was located in Byblos, became known as the "Bird's Nest".

Maria Jacobsen, who was also fluent in Armenian, often read the bible to the orphans in Armenian. Jacobsen also married an Armenian dentist.

Maria Jacobsen died on 6 April 1960 and is buried in the courtyard of Birds' Nest as desired by her will.

== Recognition and legacy ==
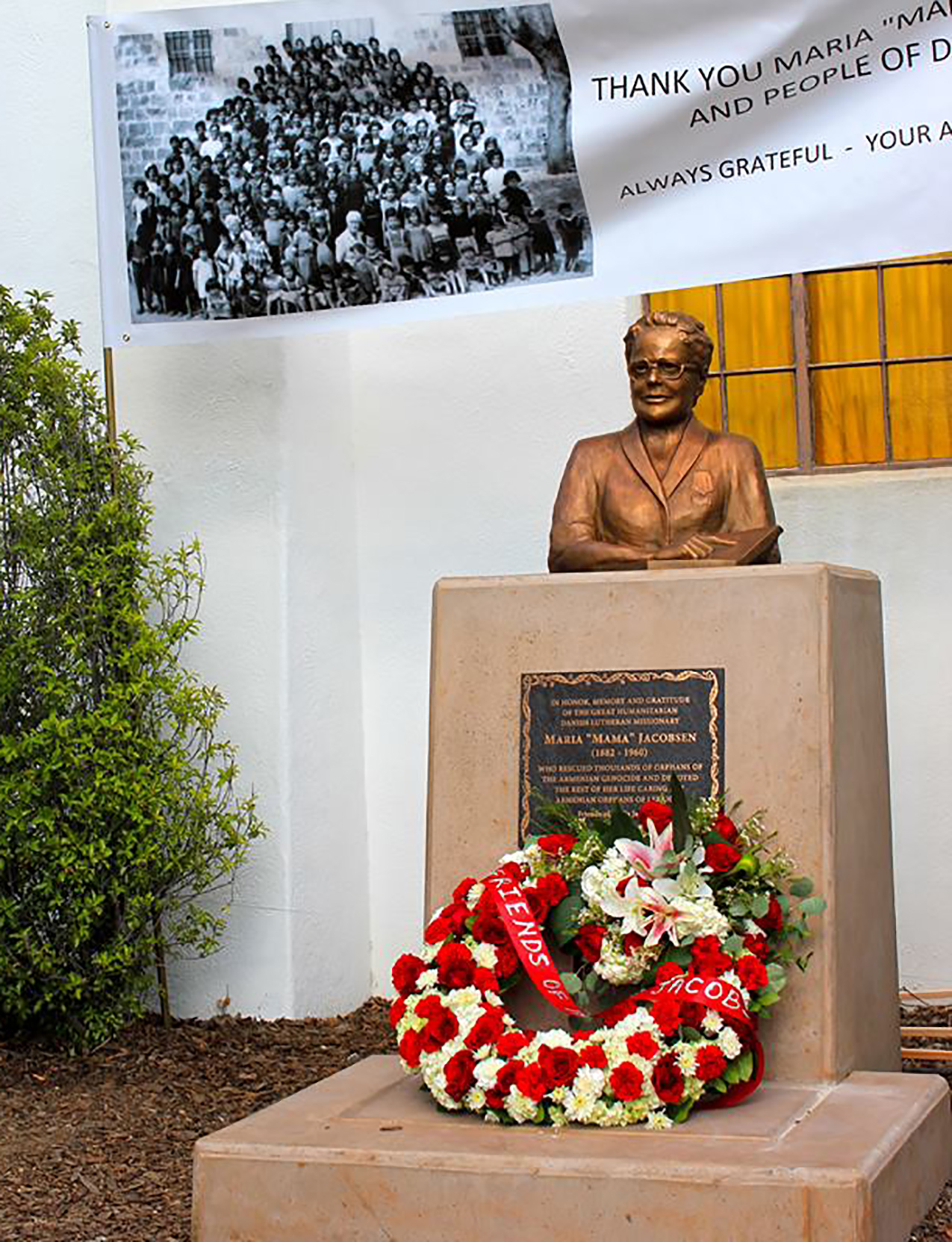
Bust of Maria Jacobsen in Solvang, California

- On the 130th anniversary of her birth, the Armenian Genocide Museum issued a jubilee postcard of Maria Jacobsen.
- Jacobsen became the first woman to receive the Danish Kingdom's Gold Medal Award in 1950.
- On her 50th Jubilee celebration, Jacobsen was awarded with the Gold Medal of Honor by the government of Lebanon on 14 December 1954. The award was given to her for her service and dedication to the Armenian community.
- The film Map of Salvation talks about Jacobsen and four European humanist women's lives (2015)
- A bust of Jacobsen was inaugurated in Solvang, California in October, 2016

== Gallery ==
Maria Jacobsen collected a series of photographs which she kept in her diary in 1919:

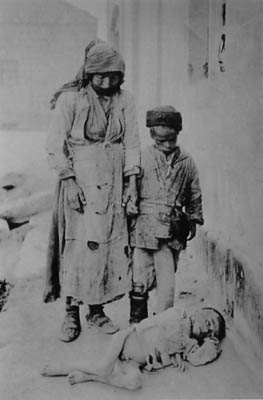

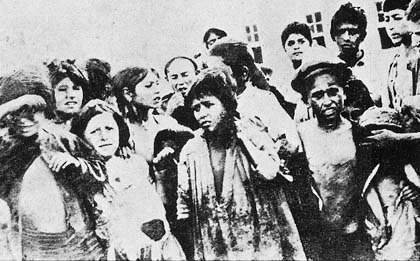

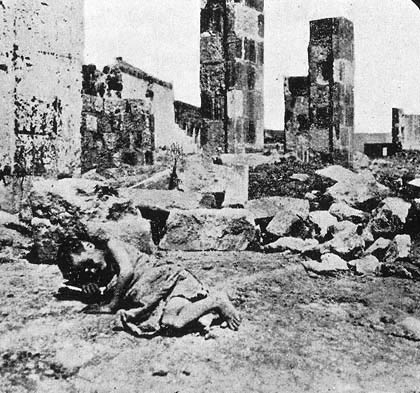

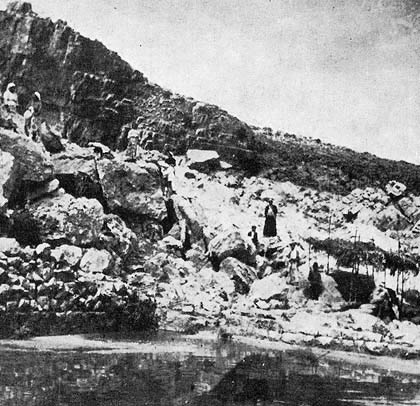
Cliff from which Armenians were hurled

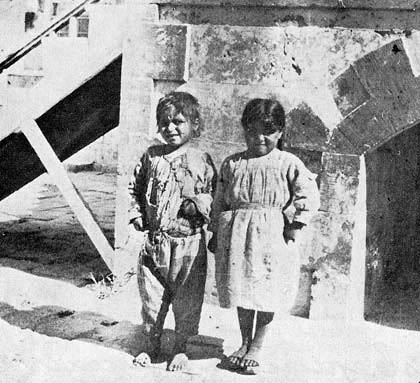

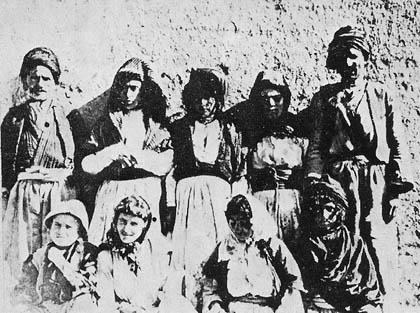
Abducted Armenian women

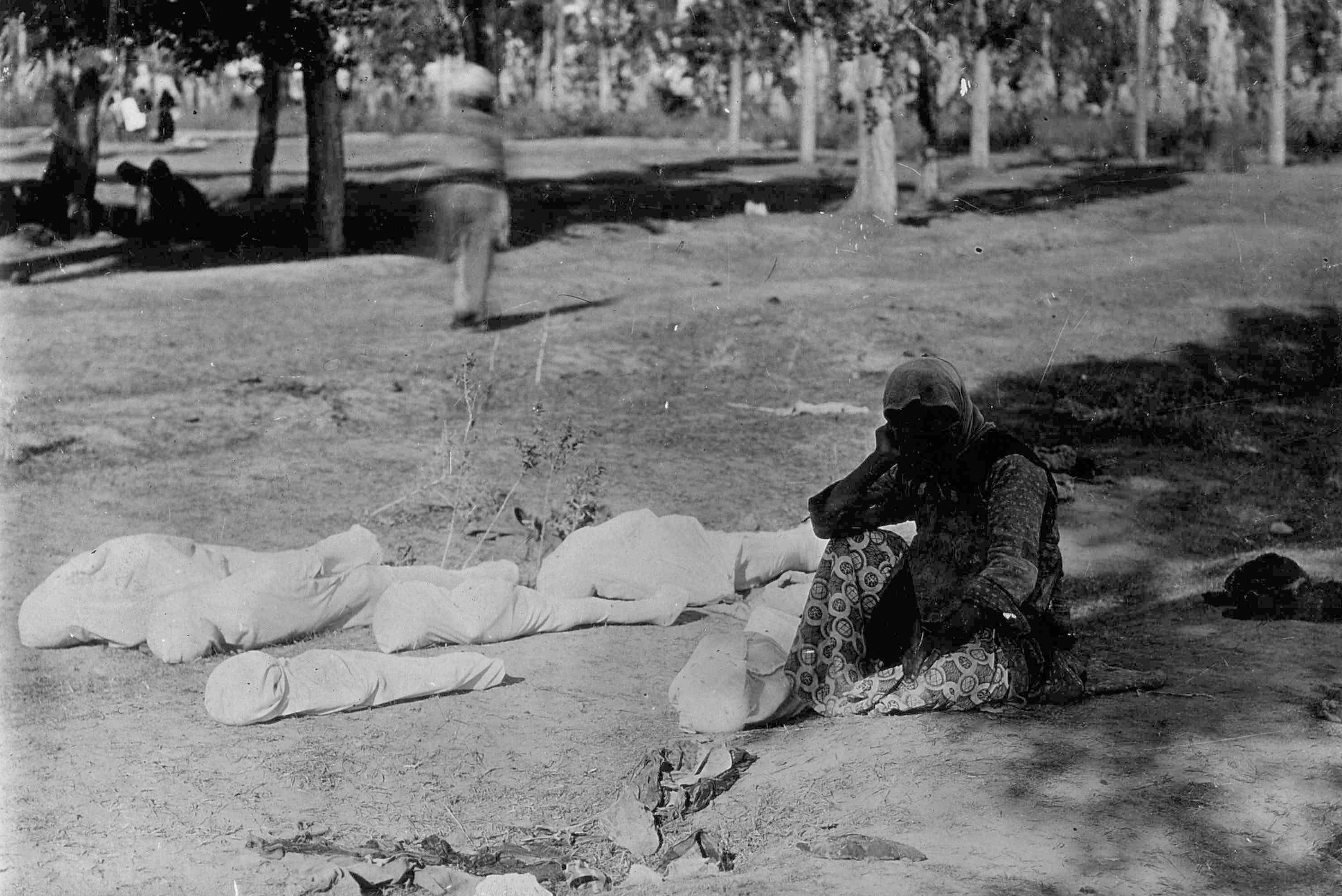
An Armenian mother beside her children's corpses

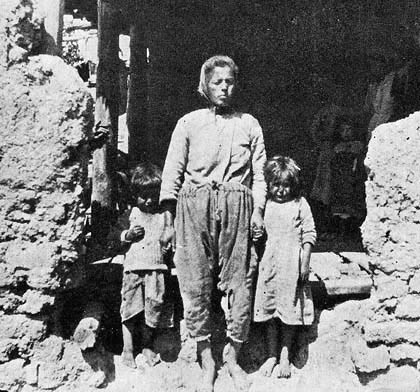

== See also ==
- Witnesses and testimonies of the Armenian genocide
