= List of locations with a subtropical climate =

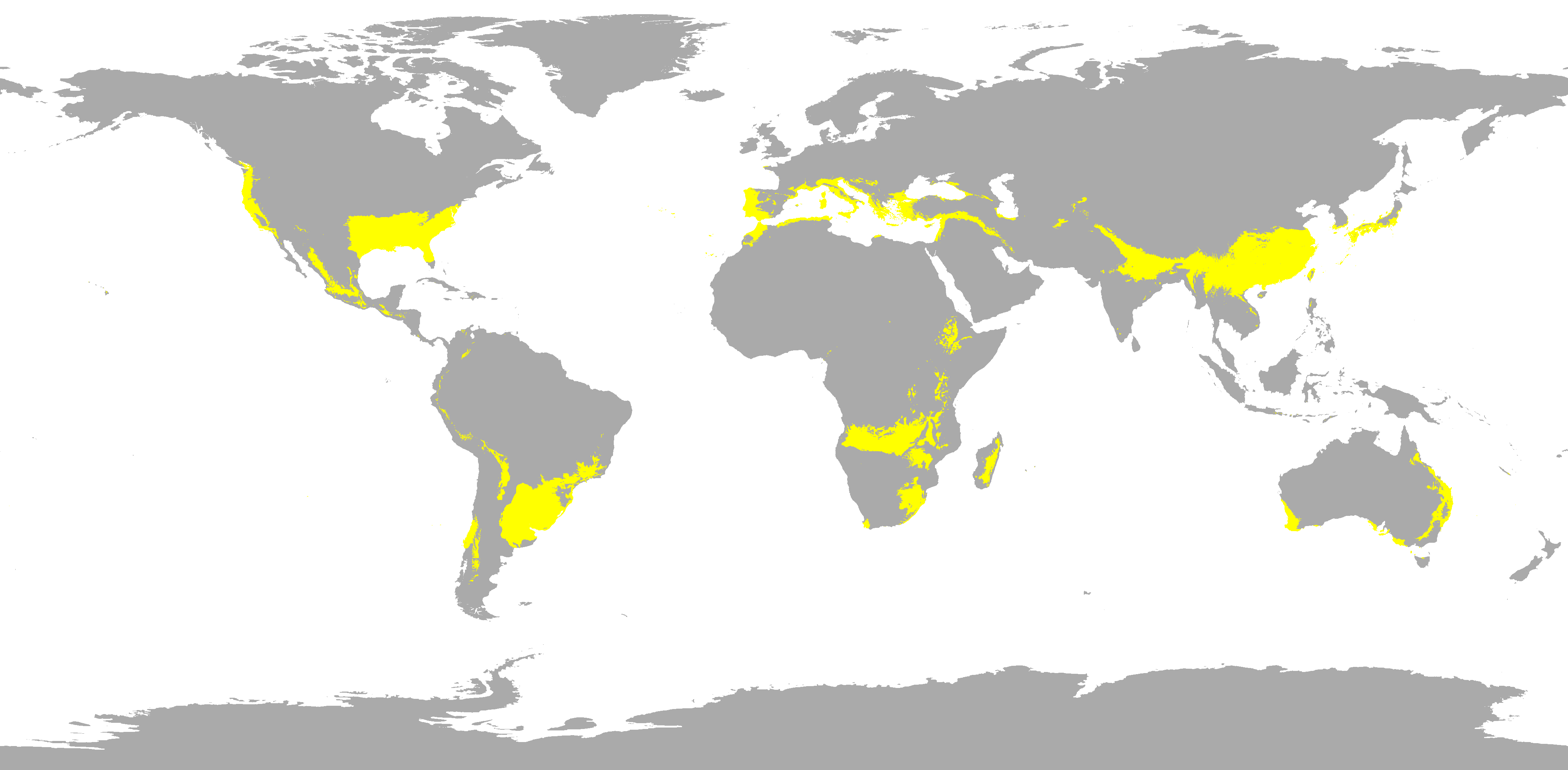
Areas of the world with subtropical climates

This list of locations with a subtropical climate specifically lists locations considered within the subtropics. The subtropics are geographic and climate zones located roughly between the Tropic of Cancer and Tropic of Capricorn and the 40th parallel in both hemispheres. Subtropical climate regions can exist at high elevations within the tropics, such as across the Mexican Plateau and the Ethiopian Highlands and in Da Lat of the Vietnamese Central Highlands. These regions can also exist beyond 45 degrees poleward due to maritime influences on the NW European and Argentinian coasts, according to Trewartha.

Six climate classifications utilise the term to help define the various temperature and precipitation regions for the planet Earth. Using the Trewartha climate classification eight or more months of the year within the subtropics have an average temperature at or above 10 °C (50 °F). The Köppen climate classification instead classifies the warmest month above 22 °C (71.6 °F) and the coldest above 0 °C (32 °F) or −3 °C (26.6 °F) depending on preference. Under both classifications, at least one month must average below 18 °C (64.4 °F) or the climate is considered tropical.

Leslie Holdridge defined the subtropical climates as having a mean annual biotemperature between the frost line or critical temperature line, 16 °C to 18 °C (depending on locations in the world) and 24 °C. The frost line separates the warm temperate region from the subtropical region. It represents the dividing line between two major physiological groups of evolved plants. On the warmer side of the line, the majority of the plants are sensitive to low temperatures. They can be killed back by frosts as they have not evolved to withstand periods of cold. On the colder temperate side of the line, the total flora is adapted to survive periods of variable length of low temperatures, whether as seeds in the case of the annuals or as perennial plants which can withstand the cold. The [16 °C-18 °C] segment is often "simplified" as 17 °C (= 2^{(log_{2}12+0;5)} ≈ 16.97 °C).

The Holdridge subtropical climates straddle more or less the warmest subtropical climates and the less warm tropical climates as defined by the Köppen-Geiger or Trewartha climate classifications.

However Wladimir Köppen has distinguished the hot or subtropical and tropical (semi-)arid climates (BWh or BSh) having an average annual temperature greater than or equal to 18 °C (64.4 °F) from the cold or temperate (semi-)arid climates (BWk or BSk) whose annual temperature average is lower. This definition, though restricted to dry regions, is almost similar to Holdridge's.

A great portion of the world's deserts are located within the subtropics, due to the development of the subtropical ridge. Within the humid monsoon regions in the subtropics such as Northern Vietnam (including Hanoi), a wet season is seen annually during the summer, which is when most of the yearly rainfall falls. Within the Mediterranean climate region, the wet season occurs during the winter. Areas bordering warm oceans are prone to locally heavy rainfall from tropical cyclones, which can contribute a significant percentage of the annual rainfall. Plants such as date palms, citrus, mango, litchi, and avocado are grown within the subtropical zones.

This is not a complete list and is not intended to be one. Many of the higher mountains at tropical latitudes have sparsely (if at all) inhabited areas with a subtropical climate.

== Africa ==
^{^1Only in Trewartha's classification.}
^{^2Which borders on a fully tropical climate.}

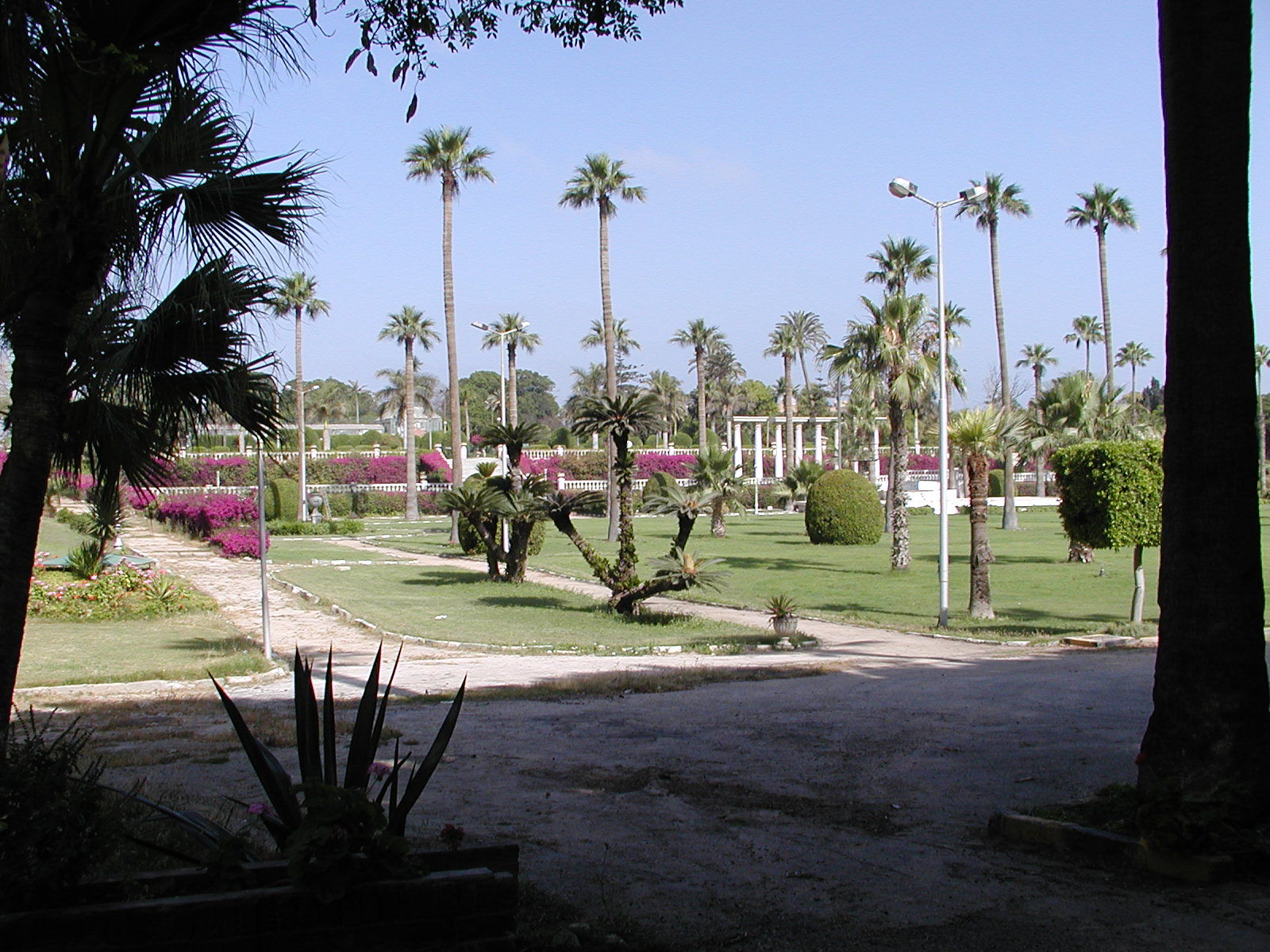
French Garden in Alexandria, Egypt.

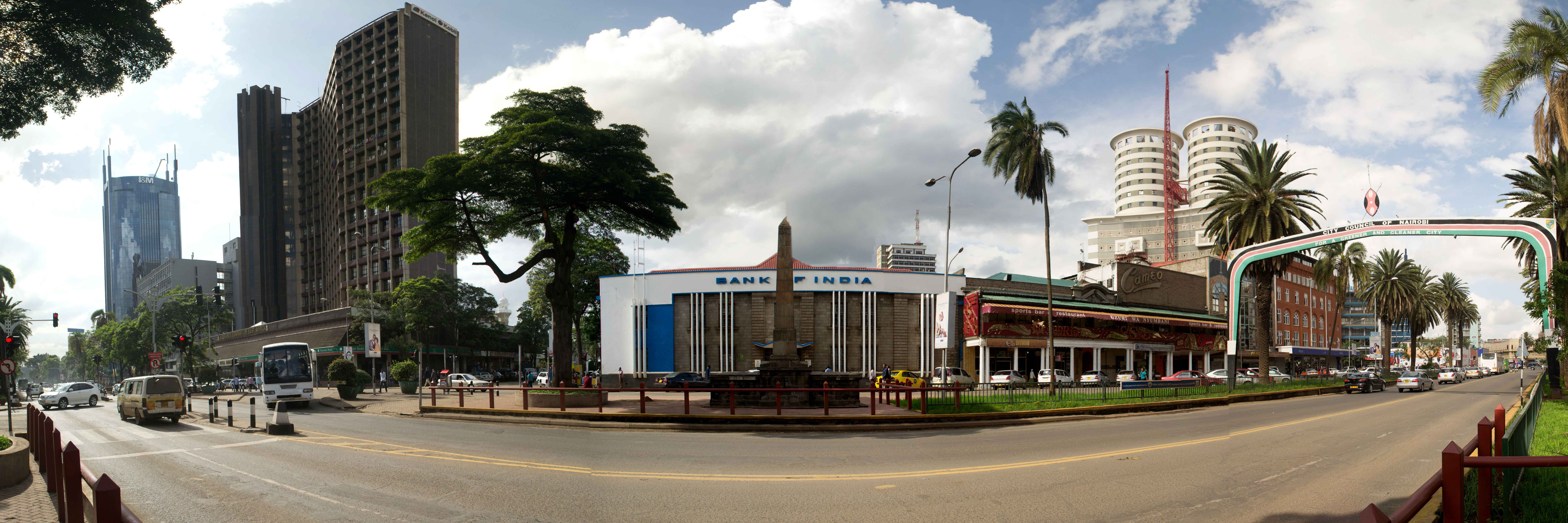
Downtown Nairobi, Kenya.

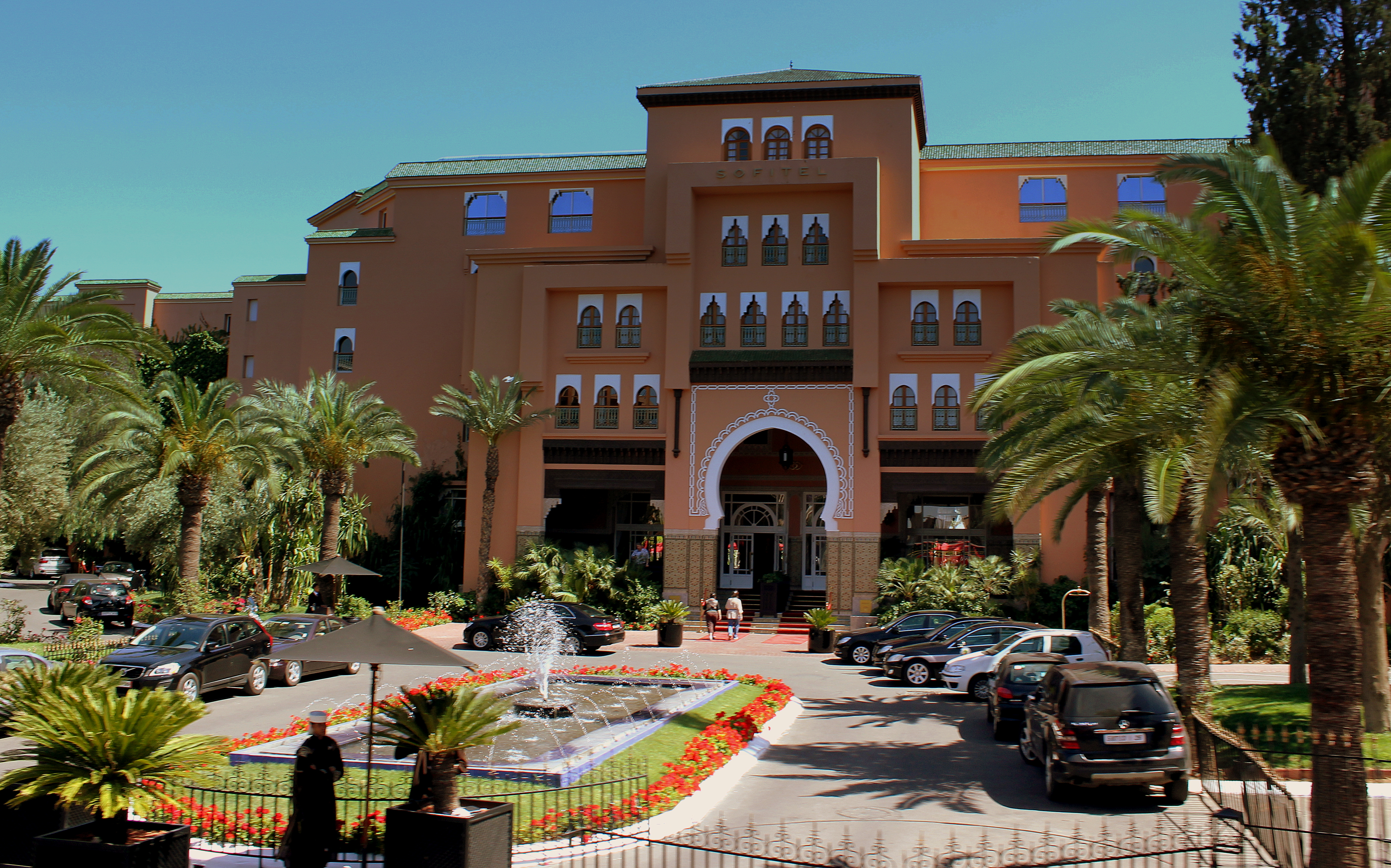
Sofitel Hotel, Marrakesh, Morocco.

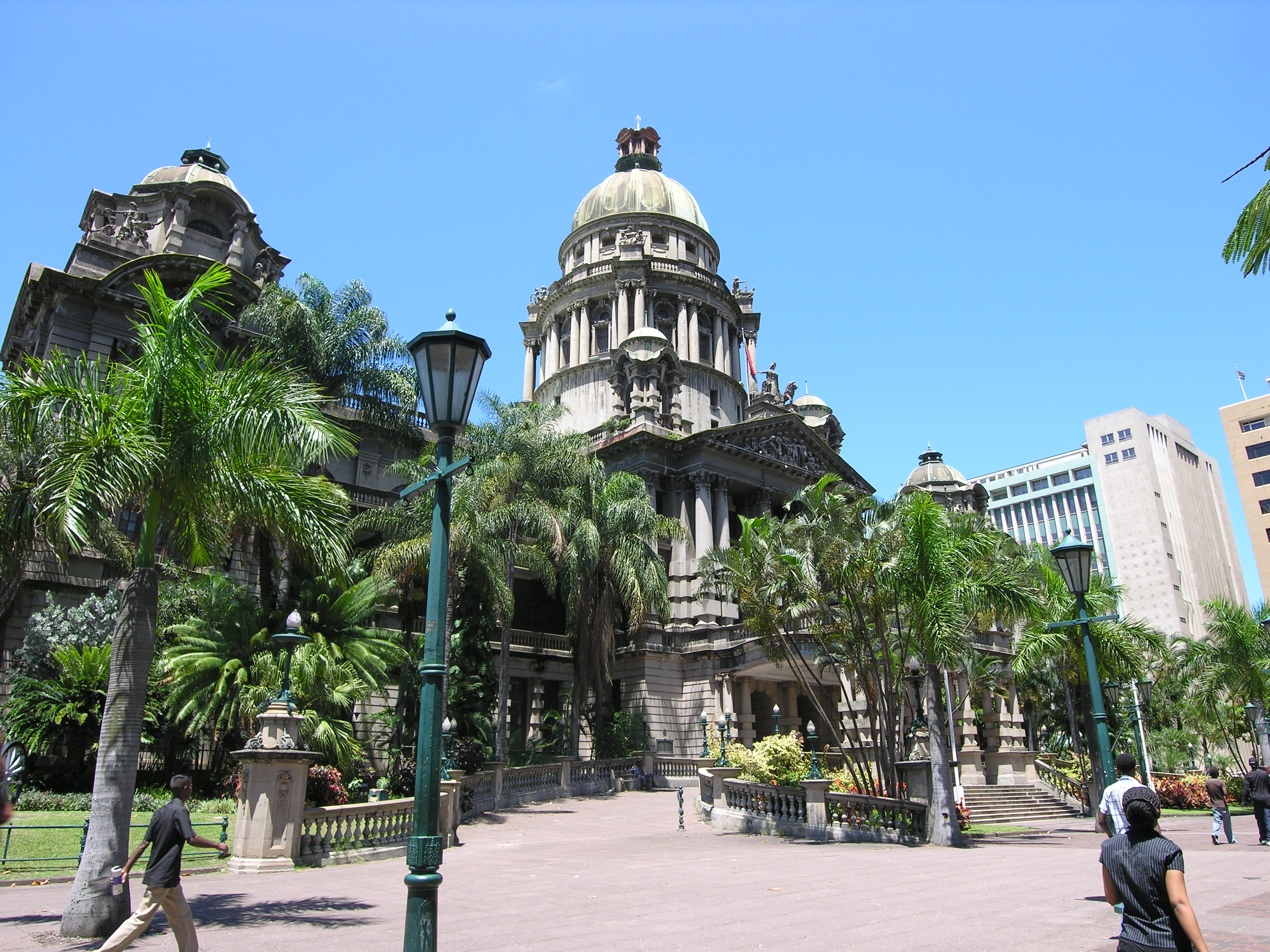
Town Hall in Durban, South Africa.

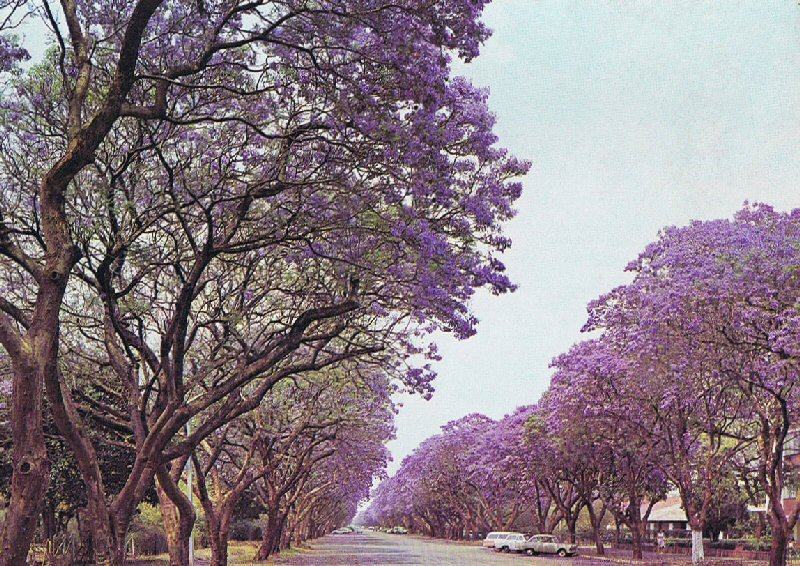
Jacaranda trees in Harare, Zimbabwe.

- Algeria: Algiers, Oran, Tamanrasset
- Angola: Cuíto^{1}, Huambo^{1}, Lubango^{1}, Luena, Menongue, Moçâmedes
- Botswana: Francistown, Gaborone, Maun
- Cameroon: Ndu^{1}
- Cape Verde: Achada Furna^{1}, Chã das Caldeiras^{1}
- Chad: Tibesti Mountains
- Democratic Republic of the Congo: Kolwezi^{2}, Likasi, Lubumbashi
- Djibouti: Airolaf
- Egypt: Alexandria, Aswan, Cairo
- Eritrea: Asmara^{1}, Keren^{1}, Nakfa
- Eswatini: Mbabane^{1}
- Ethiopia: Addis Ababa^{1}, Bahir Dar^{2}, Jijiga^{1}
- Kenya: Eldoret^{1}, Nairobi^{1}, Nakuru^{1}
- Lesotho: Maseru^{1}
- Libya: Al Jawf, Bayda^{1}, Benghazi, Sabha, Tripoli
- Madagascar: Antananarivo^{1}, Antsirabe^{1}, Fianarantsoa^{1}
- Malawi: Dedza^{1}, Lilongwe
- Mali: Taoudenni^{2}
- Mauritania: Zouérat
- Mauritius: Piton de la Petite Rivière Noire
- Morocco: Casablanca, Essaouira^{1}, Fez, Marrakesh, Meknes, Rabat, Tangier
- Mozambique: Lichinga^{1}
- Namibia: Keetmanshoop, Lüderitz^{1}, Swakopmund^{1}, Walvis Bay^{1}, Windhoek
- Niger: Aïr Mountains
- Réunion: Interior (beaches are tropical)
- São Tomé and Príncipe: Pico de São Tomé^{1}
- Somalia: Erigavo^{1}
- Somaliland: Hargeisa
- South Africa: most of including Bloemfontein, Cape Town^{1}, Durban, East London, George^{1}, Johannesburg^{1}, Kimberley, Musina, Pietermaritzburg, Port Elizabeth^{1}, and Pretoria.
- South Sudan: Imatong Mountains (highest areas only)
- Tanzania: Arusha^{1}, Mbeya^{1},
- Tunisia: Medenine, Tunis
- Uganda: Kabale^{1}
- Western Sahara: Laayoune
- Zambia: Livingstone, Lusaka, Ndola
- Zimbabwe: Bulawayo^{1}, Harare^{1}, Marondera^{1}
- Islands of the European Union around the Atlantic coast of NW Africa:
  - Canary Islands, Spain: Central El Hierro; Fuerteventura^{2}; Lanzarote; San Cristóbal de La Laguna, Tenerife^{1}; Santa Cruz de La Palma^{2}
  - Madeira archipelago, Portugal
- Ceuta, Melilla, and Plazas de soberanía, Spain.
- Pantelleria and the Pelagian Islands, Italy
- British islands in the South Atlantic:
  - Saint Helena: Longwood^{1}
  - Tristan da Cunha archipelago^{1}

== Asia ==
^{^1Only in Trewartha's classification.}
^{^2Which borders on a fully tropical climate.}
^{^3Borderline.}

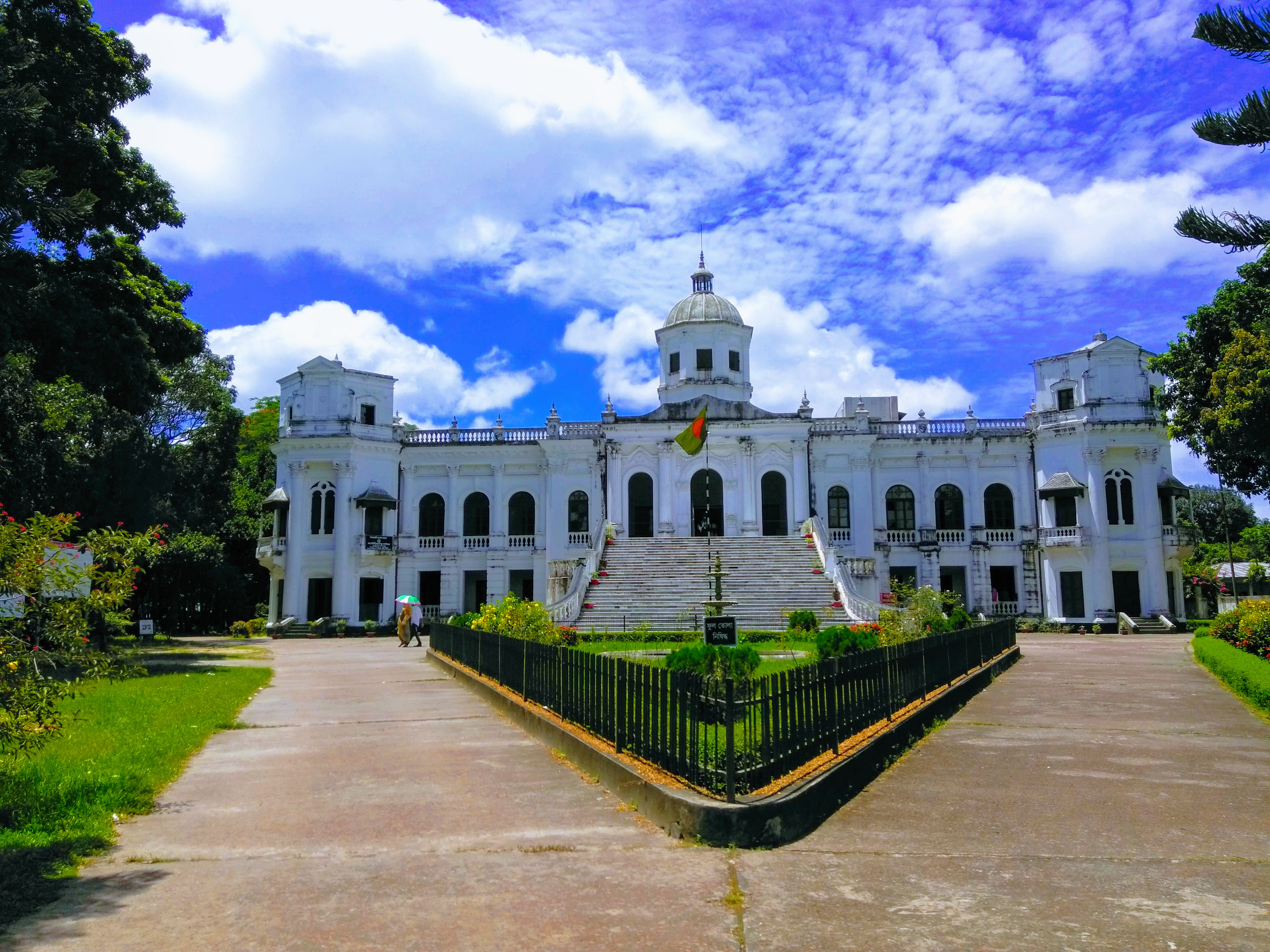
Tajhat Palace, Rangpur, Bangladesh

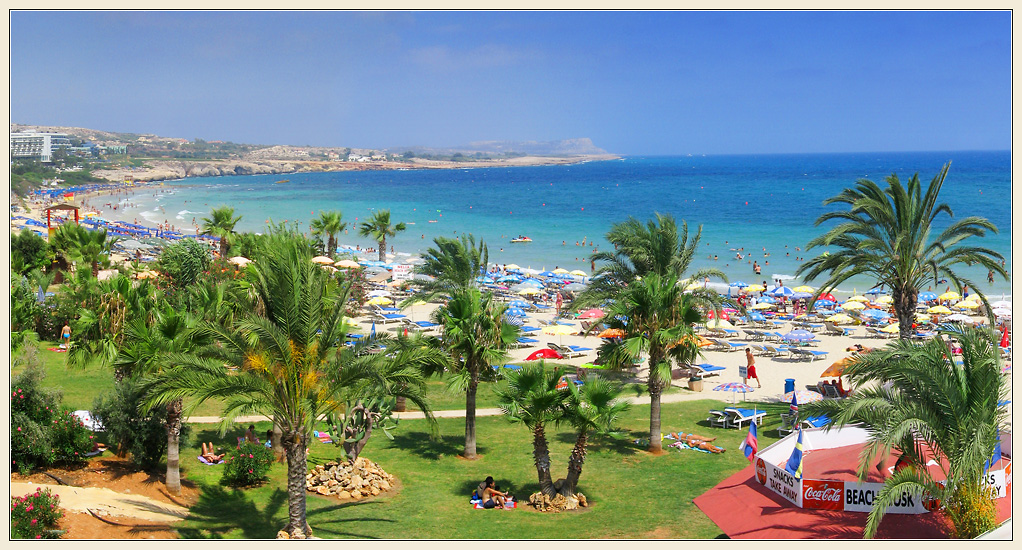
Ayia Napa, Cyprus

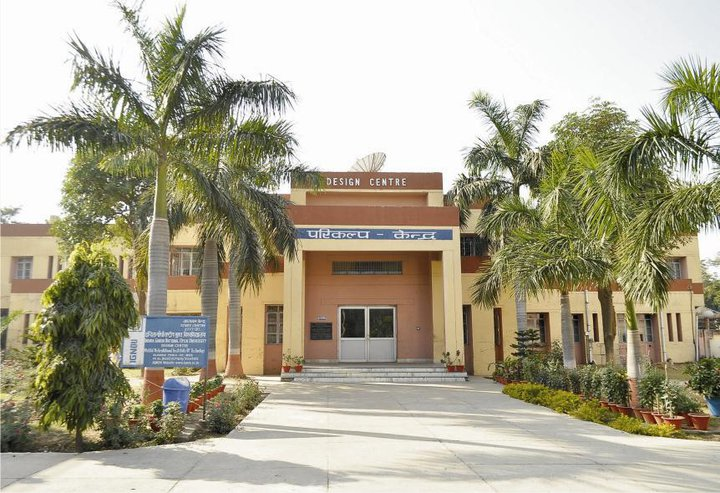
Motilal Nehru National Institute of Technology Allahabad, India

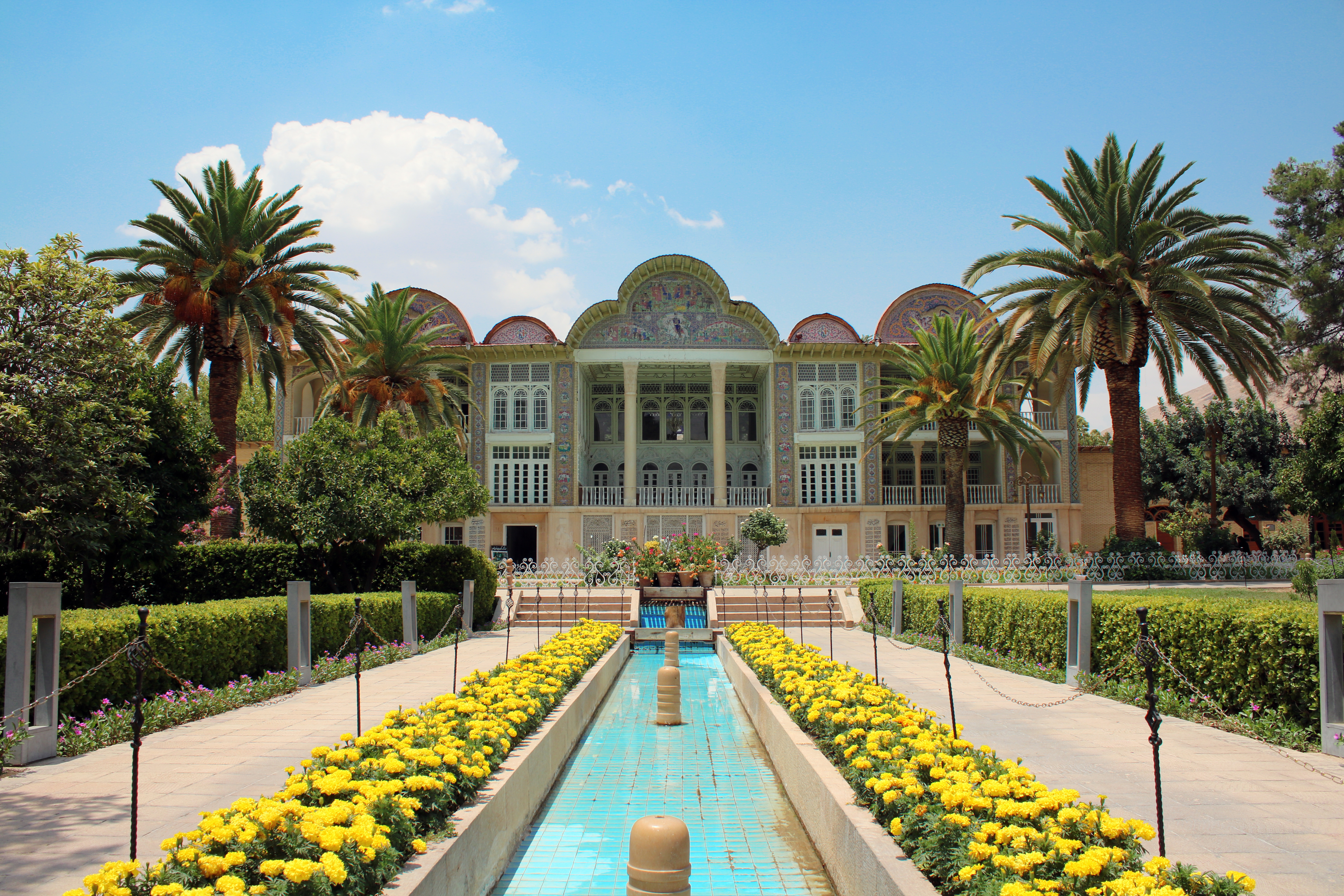
Shiraz Botanical Garden, Iran.

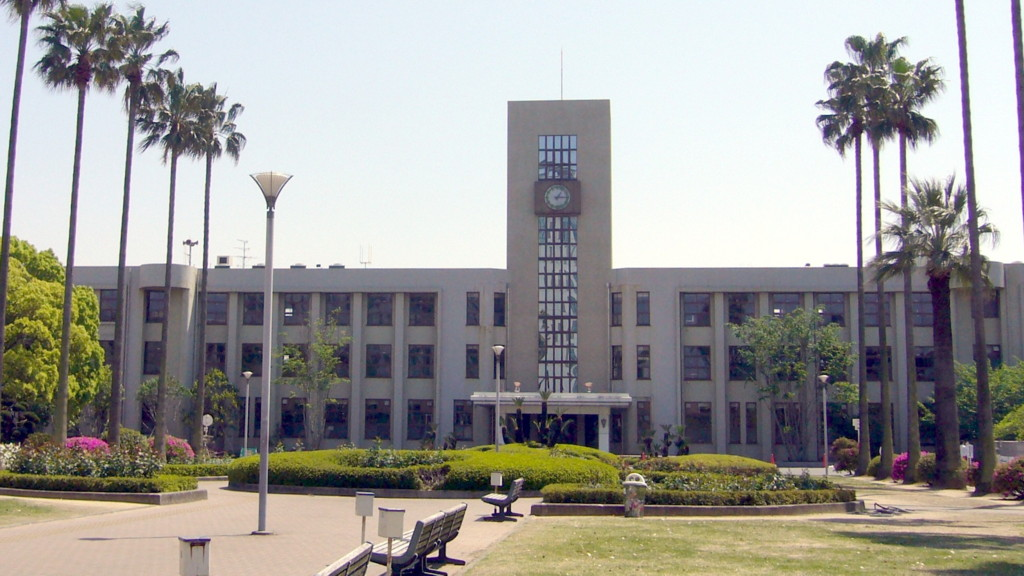
Osaka City University, Japan.

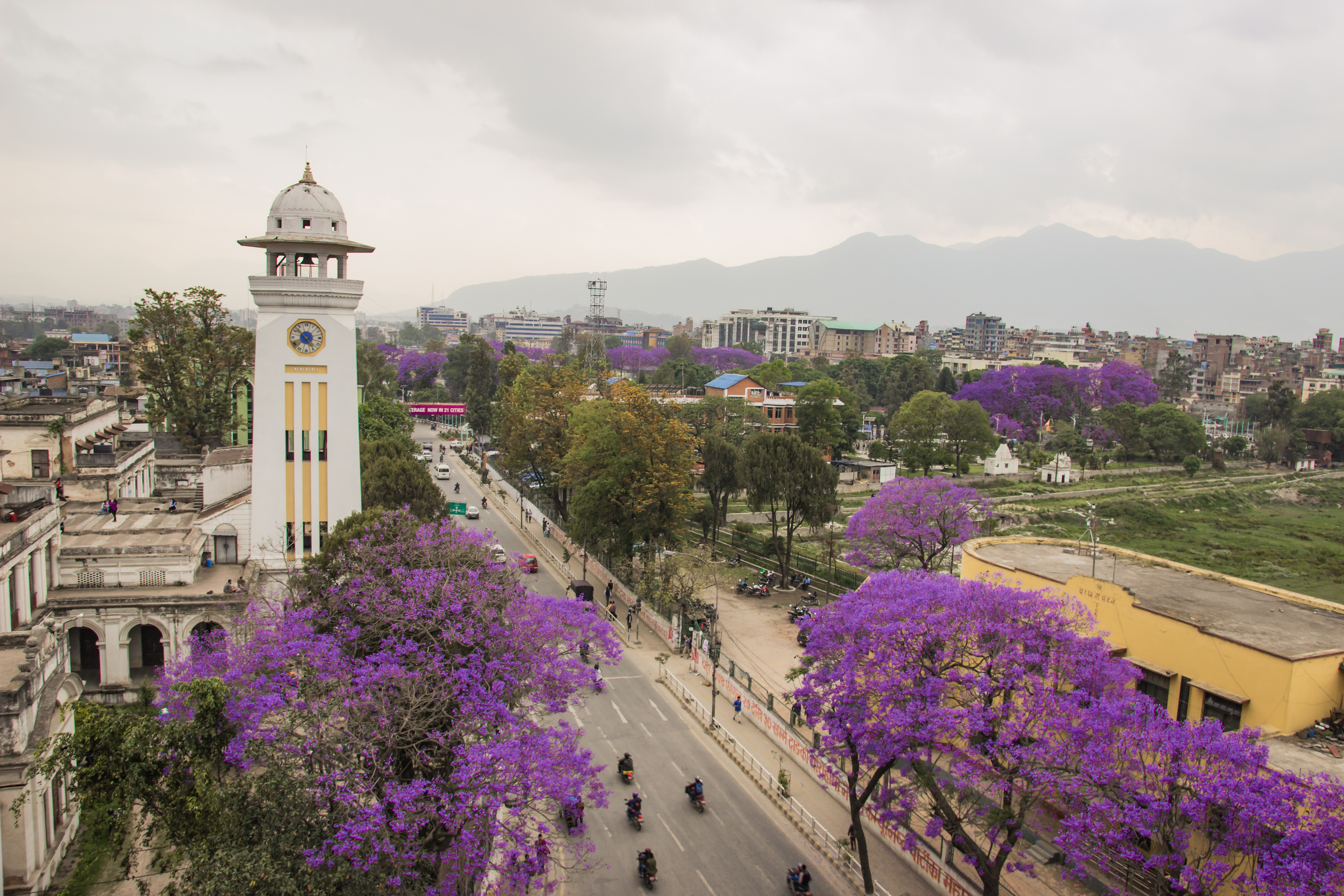
Ghantaghar and Jacaranda, Kathmandu, Nepal

- Afghanistan: Herat, Jalalabad, Kandahar, Khost, Kunduz, Lashkargah, Mazar-i-Sharif
- Akrotiri and Dhekelia
- Azerbaijan: Astara, Baku^{3}, Lankaran, Mingachevir^{3}, Şirvan^{3}
- Bahrain: Manama
- Bangladesh: Dinajpur, Rangpur City, Saidpur
- Bhutan: Thimphu^{1}
- Brunei: Pagon Hill^{1}
- Cambodia: Cardamom Mountains
- China: Beiliu, Changsha, Chengdu, Chongqing, Dongguan, Fuzhou, Guangzhou, Guilin, Guiyang, Hangzhou, Hefei, Kunming^{1}, Nanjing, Nanning, Ningbo, Shanghai, Shenzhen, Suzhou, Turpan^{1}, Wuhan, Xiamen, Yancheng, Yangzhou, Zhengzhou^{3}
- Cyprus: Ayia Napa, Larnaca, Limassol, Nicosia
- Egypt: Sinai Peninsula
- Georgia: Batumi, Kutaisi, Sokhumi (capital of Abkhazia), Zugdidi^{3}
- Greece: Chios, Dodecanese Islands, Lesbos
- Hong Kong: Kowloon, Wan Chai
- India: Agartala, Agra, Aizawl, Allahabad, Amritsar, Bhopal^{2}, Cardamom Hills, Chandigarh, Dehradun, Delhi, Dhanbad^{2}, Dimapur, Faridabad, Gangtok^{1}, Ghaziabad, Guwahati, Imphal, Itanagar, Jaipur, Jammu, Kanpur, Kodaikanal^{1}, Kohima^{1}, Lucknow, Ludhiana, Meerut, Ooty^{1}, Patna, Ranchi, Shillong^{1}, Shimla^{1}, and Varanasi.
- Indonesia: Batu^{1}, Barisan Mountains^{1}, Bromo Tengger Semeru^{1}, Dieng Plateau^{1}, Puncak pass^{1}
- Iran: Abadan, Ahvaz, Bandar Abbas^{2}, Bandar-e Anzali, Birjand, Bushehr, Dezful, Gorgan, Ilam, Isfahan, Kashan, Kerman, Khorramabad, Qom, Rasht, Sabzevar, Sari, Saveh, Semnan, Shiraz, Sirjan, lower elevations of Tehran, Yazd, Zahedan
- Iraq: Baghdad, Basra, Erbil, Mosul, Sulaymaniyah
- Israel: Eilat, Haifa, Jerusalem, Tel Aviv
- Japan: Bonin Islands^{2}, Fukuoka, Hiroshima, Izu Islands, Jōetsu^{3}, Kanazawa, Kumagaya, Kyoto, Maebashi, Matsuyama, Nagasaki, Nagoya, Naha, Nasushiobara^{3}, Niigata, Okayama, Osaka, Sado^{3}, Tokyo, Yamaguchi^{3}, Yokohama.
- Jordan: Amman, Petra
- Kuwait: Kuwait City
- Laos: Phongsali^{1}, Phonsavan
- Lebanon: Beirut, Tripoli
- Macau: Coloane, Taipa
- Malaysia: Brinchang^{1}, Cameron Highlands^{1}, Genting Highlands^{1}
- Myanmar: Hakha^{1}, Lashio, Mogok, Putao Town, Tamu, Taunggyi
- Nepal: Kathmandu, Pokhara
- Northern Cyprus: North Nicosia
- Oman: Saiq
- Pakistan: most of (except for tropical Arabian Sea coast) including Faisalabad, Hyderabad^{2}, Islamabad, Lahore, Mardan, Multan, Muzaffarabad, Peshawar, and Quetta.
- Palestinian territories: East Jerusalem, Gaza City, Nablus
- Philippines: Atok^{1}, Baguio^{1} ^{2}, Balbalan^{2}, La Trinidad^{1}
- Qatar: Doha^{2}
- Saudi Arabia: Dammam, Dhahran, Hofuf, Jubail, Medina^{2}, Riyadh, Tabuk
- South Korea: Busan, Changwon, Geochagundo, Geoje, Jeju, Tongyeong, Ulsan^{3}, Yeosu
- Sri Lanka: Nuwara Eliya^{1}
- Syria: Aleppo, Damascus, Homs, Latakia, Raqqa
- Taiwan: Chiayi, Hsinchu, Penghu (disputed with China), Taichung, Tainan, Taipei
- Tajikistan: Bokhtar, Dushanbe^{3}, Kulob
- Turkey: Adana, Antakya, Antalya, Batman^{3}, Bursa, Çanakkale, Gaziantep, İnebolu, İskenderun, Istanbul (also in Europe)^{3}, İzmir, Mersin, Samsun^{3}, Sinop^{3}, Tekirdağ (Europe), Trabzon^{3}, Urfa
- Turkmenistan: Ashgabat, Balkanabat, Kerki, Mary, Türkmenabat
- United Arab Emirates: Sharjah
- Uzbekistan: Bukhara^{3}, Namangan^{3}, Navoiy^{3}, Qarshi, Tashkent^{3}, Termez
- Vietnam: Da Lat^{1}, Haiphong, Hanoi, Sa Pa^{1}
- Yemen: Hajjah, Kawkaban, Sana^{1}

== Americas ==
^{^1Only in Trewartha's classification.}
^{^2Borderline.}
^{^3Borderline only in Trewartha's classification.}
^{^4Which borders on a fully tropical climate.}

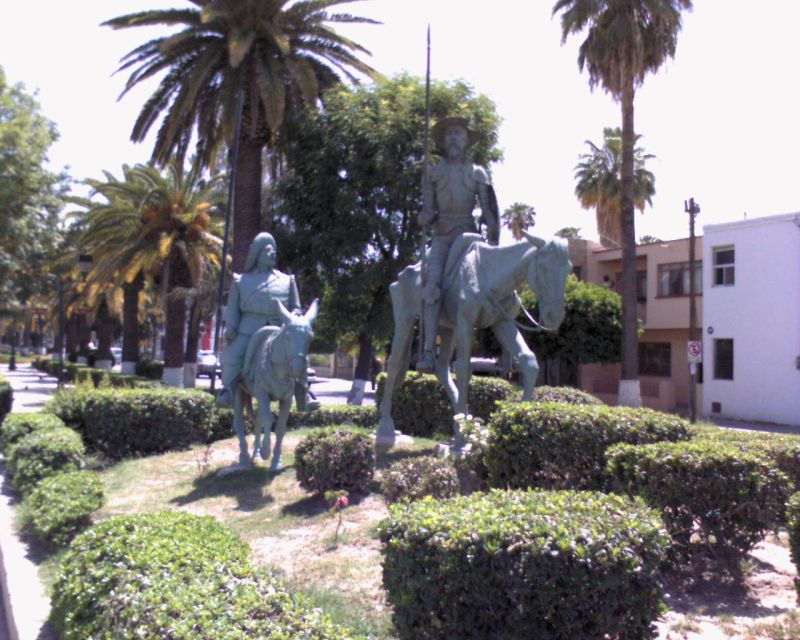
Statue of Don Quixote, Torreón, Mexico

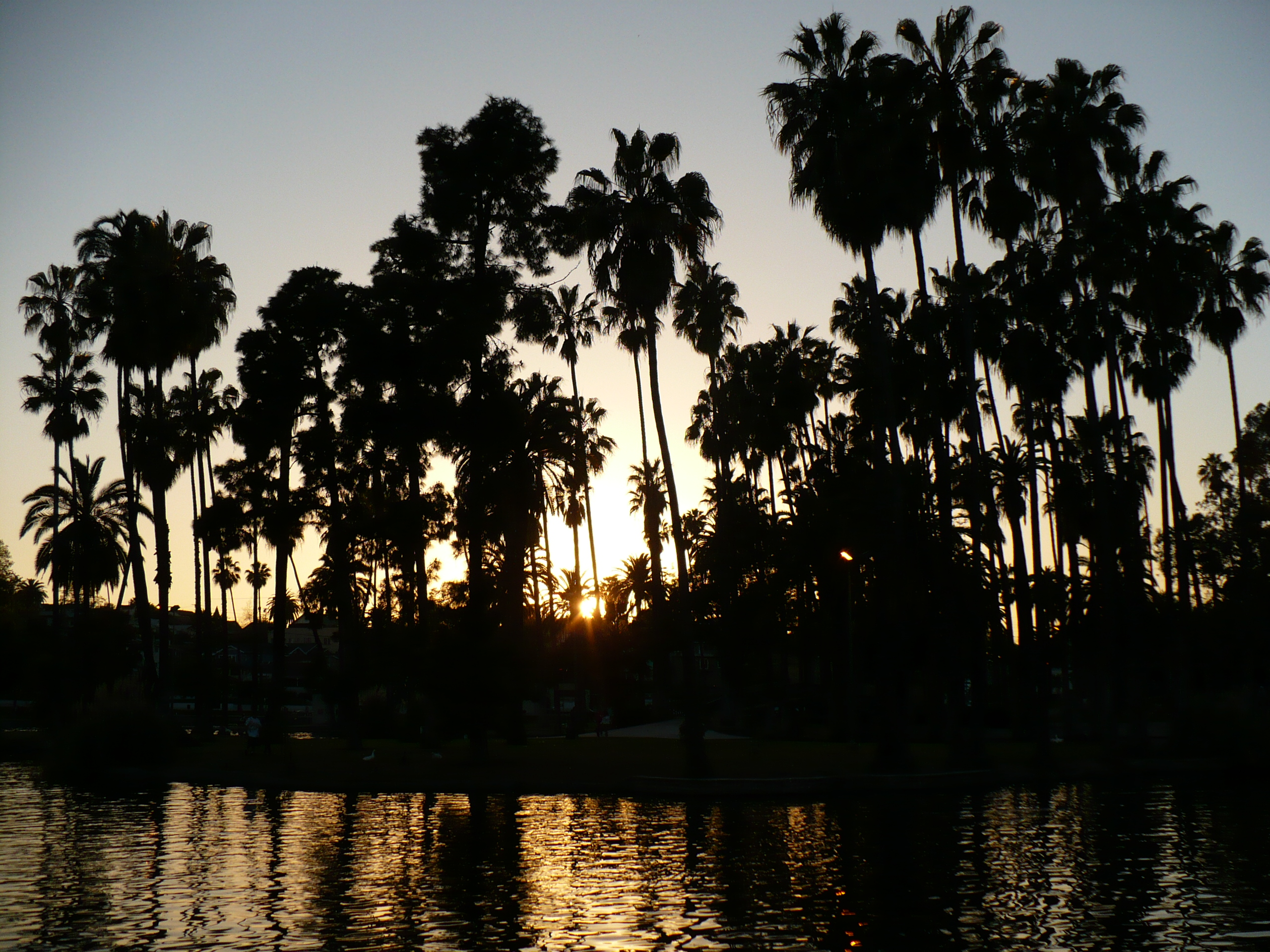
Echo Park, Los Angeles, United States

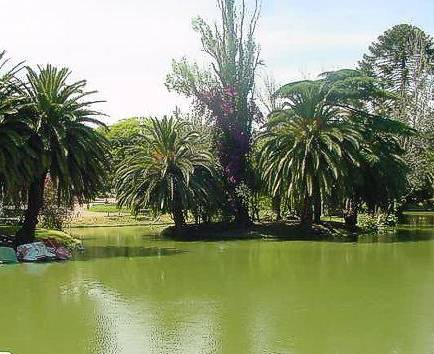
Parque Rodó, Montevideo, Uruguay

- Argentina: Extreme north to coastal Chubut Province including Bahía Blanca, Buenos Aires, Comodoro Rivadavia^{3}, Córdoba, Corrientes, La Plata, Mar del Plata^{1}, Mendoza, Neuquén, Pinamar^{1}, Rawson^{3}, Resistencia, Rosario, Salta^{1}, San Miguel de Tucumán, Santa Fe and Viedma
- Bermuda^{4}
- Bolivia: Cochabamba^{1}, lower elevations of La Paz^{1}, Sucre^{1}, Tarija^{1}
- Brazil: Paraná, Rio Grande do Sul, Santa Catarina, and parts of Mato Grosso do Sul and São Paulo states including the city of São Paulo. Also Petrópolis and Teresópolis in Rio de Janeiro State and highlands of Minas Gerais including Juiz de Fora and Três Corações.
- Chile: North of 40°S including Antofagasta^{1}, Arica, Concepción^{1}, Copiapó, Iquique, Juan Fernández Islands^{1}, Linares^{1}, Rancagua^{1}, Santiago^{1}, Talca^{1}, Temuco^{3}, Valdivia^{3}, and Valparaíso^{1}.
- Colombia: Bogotá^{1}, Manizales^{1}, Pasto^{1}, Tunja^{1}
- Costa Rica: Mount Chirripó^{1}
- Dominican Republic: Constanza^{1}
- Ecuador: Ambato^{1}, Cuenca^{1}, Ibarra^{1}, Latacunga^{1}, Quito^{1}, Riobamba^{1}
- El Salvador: Cerro El Pital^{1}
- Guatemala: Antigua Guatemala^{1}, Cobán^{1}, Fraijanes^{1}, Quetzaltenango^{1}
- Haiti: Kenscoff^{1} ^{4}
- Honduras: La Esperanza^{1}, Santa Rosa de Copán^{1}, Siguatepeque^{4}
- Jamaica: Blue Mountains^{1}
- Mexico: Almost all of the northern part (Culiacán and Los Cabos are tropical) and some other highland areas including the Mexican Plateau. Major cities include Aguascalientes City, Chihuahua, Ciudad Juárez, Guadalajara, Hermosillo, León, Matamoros, Mexicali, Mexico City^{1}, Monterrey, Puebla^{1}, Querétaro City, Reynosa, San Luis Potosí City^{1}, Tijuana, Torreón, and Zapopan. Also Ciudad Constitución, Ciudad Victoria, Durango City, Ensenada, Guadalupe Island^{1}, Guanajuato City, La Paz, Morelia^{1}, Pachuca^{1}, Rosarito^{1}, Saltillo, Tepic, Tlaxcala City^{1}, Toluca^{1}, Xalapa^{1}, and Zacatecas City^{1}.
- Nicaragua: Mogotón^{1}
- Panama: Cerro Punta^{1}
- Paraguay: southern areas including Asunción, Ciudad del Este and Encarnación
- Peru: Arequipa^{1}, Ayacucho^{1}, Cajamarca^{1}, Chachapoyas^{1}, Cusco^{1}, Lima, Trujillo
- United States: East Coast from the southern Delmarva Peninsula to Florida (but not including tropical South Florida, Everglades, and the Florida Keys), Gulf Coast, parts of the inland South and Southwest, and the West Coast from San Diego to northern California and coastal southern Oregon. Major cities: Atlanta; Austin; Bakersfield, CA; Baltimore^{2};Birmingham; Charleston, SC; Charlotte; Dallas; El Paso; Fresno, CA; Greensboro, NC^{2}; Greenville, SC; Houston; Jacksonville; Knoxville, TN^{2}; Las Vegas; Little Rock, AR; Los Angeles; Memphis; Nashville^{2}; New Orleans; Norfolk; Oklahoma City; Orlando; Phoenix; Raleigh; Richmond, VA^{2}; Riverside, CA; Sacramento; San Antonio; San Diego; San Francisco^{1}; San Jose^{1}; Savannah, GA; Tampa; Tucson; Tulsa; Virginia Beach. Washington, D.C.^{2}. The humid subtropical zone of the US South according to Trewartha is coloured yellow-green on this map: If using the Köppen climate classification with the 0 °C coldest-month isotherm, the subtropics extend from Martha's Vineyard, extreme SW Rhode Island, and most of Long Island to central Florida in the eastern states, include the southern tier of the Midwest, and extend as far north as the Columbia Valley of SE Washington in the inland west. Under this definition Boise, Cincinnati, Denver, Harrisburg, and St. Louis are borderline and Walla Walla, Washington is Csa, but the Pacific coastline is Csb.
- Uruguay: All
- Venezuela: Mucuchíes^{1}

== Europe ==
^{^1Only in Trewartha's classification.}
^{^2Borderline.}
^{^3Borderline only in Trewartha's classification.}

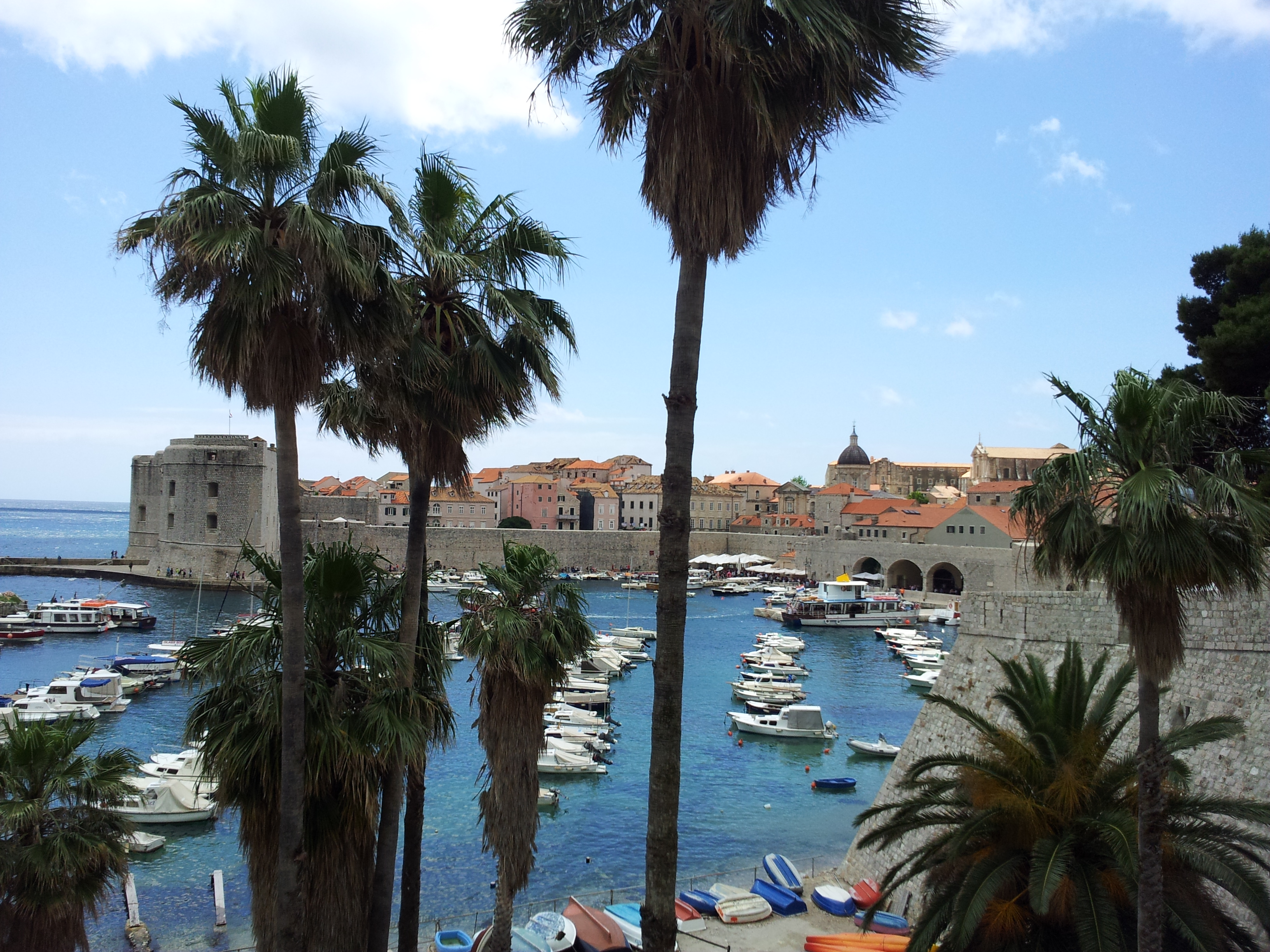
Dubrovnik harbour, Croatia

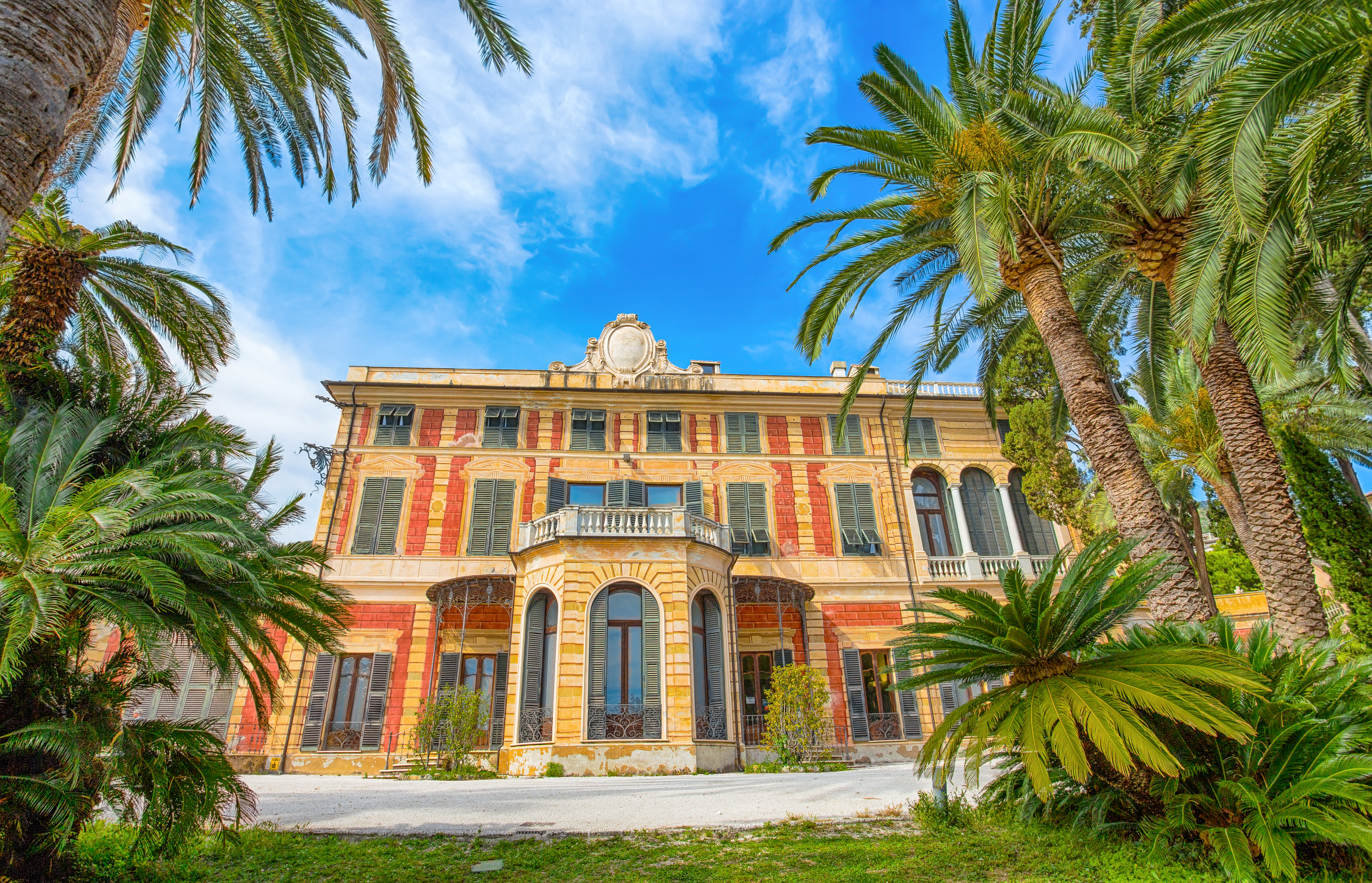
Villa Groppallo Serra, Genoa, Italy

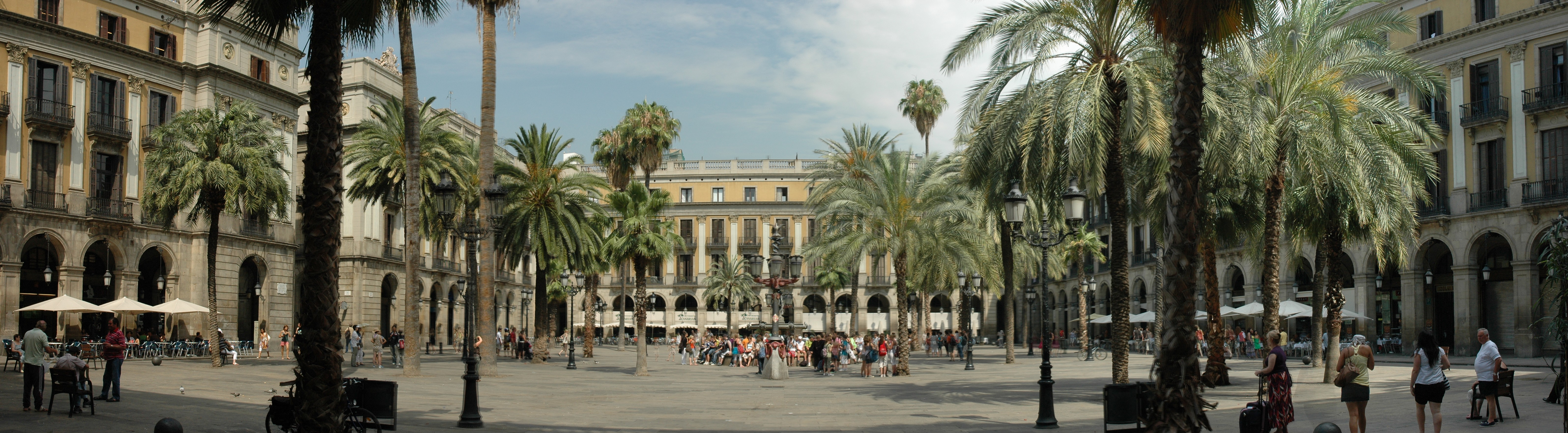
Plaça Reial, Barcelona, Catalonia, Spain

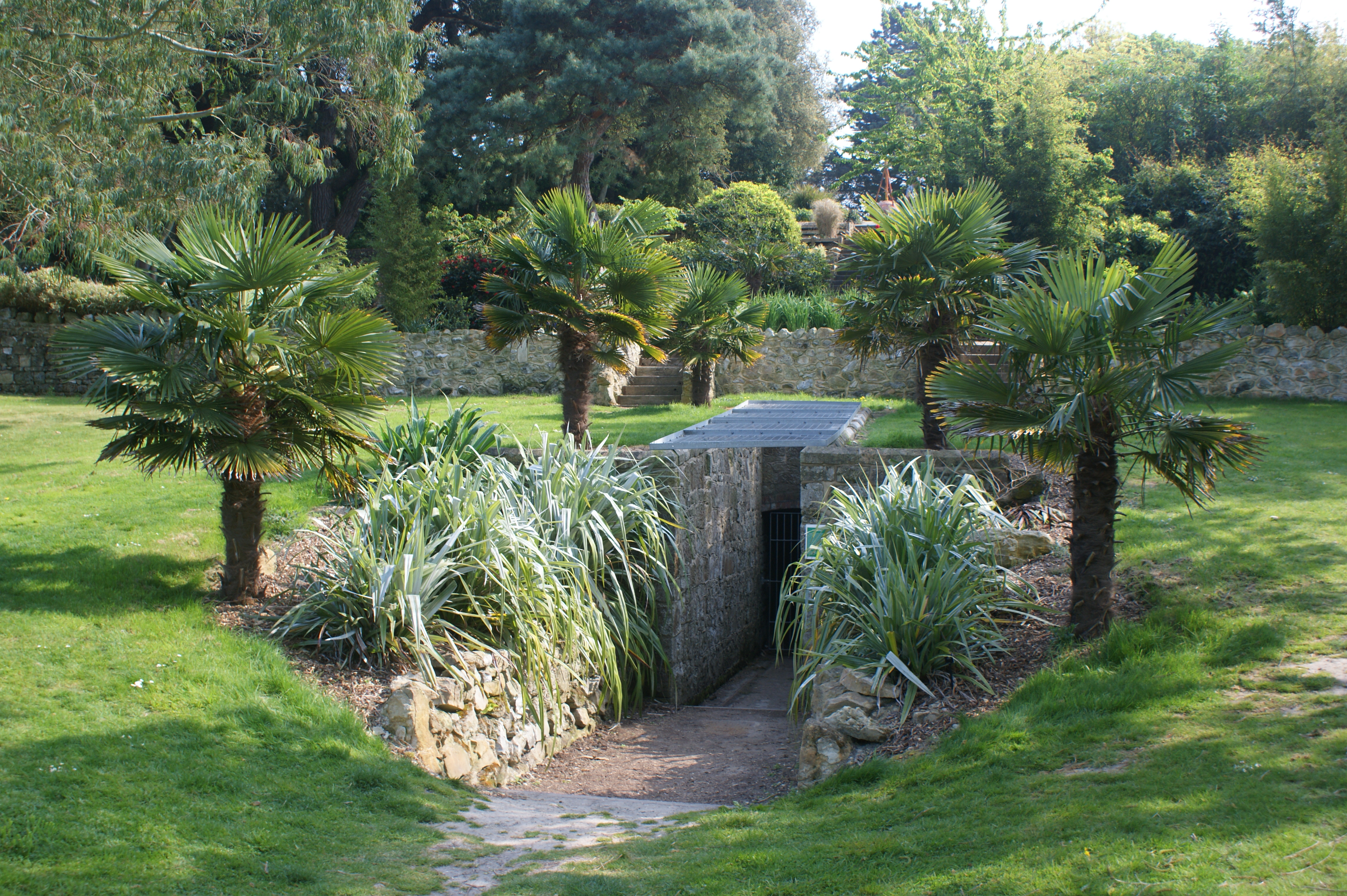
Ventnor Botanical Gardens, Isle of Wight, United Kingdom

- Albania: Durrës, Elbasan, Shkodër, Tirana, Vlorë
- Bosnia and Herzegovina: Coastal strip including Neum, Mostar^{2}
- Bulgaria: Burgas^{2}, Petrich, Plovdiv^{2}, Sandanski, Sozopol, Sunny Beach, Tsarevo, Varna^{2}
- Crimea: Yalta^{2} (disputed between Russia and Ukraine)
- Croatia: Dubrovnik, Pula, Rijeka^{2}, Split, Zadar
- France: Agen^{2}, Ajaccio, Avignon, Belle Île^{1}, Biarritz^{1}, Bordeaux^{1}, Cannes, Île d'Yeu^{1}, La Rochelle^{3}, Lourdes^{3}, Marseille, Montpellier, Narbonne, Nice, Nîmes, Noirmoutier^{3}, Perpignan, Toulon, Toulouse^{2}, Ushant^{3}
- Gibraltar
- Greece: Athens, Corfu, Heraklion, Larissa, Patras, Thessaloniki
- Italy: Bari, Cagliari, Capri, Elba, Ferrara^{2}, Florence, Genoa, Livorno, Naples, Palermo, Parma, Perugia^{2}, Pescara, Pisa, Ravenna , Rome, Taranto, Trieste^{2}
- Malta: Birkirkara, Valletta
- Monaco
- Montenegro: Bar, Kotor , Podgorica
- North Macedonia: Gevgelija
- Portugal: Azores, Braga^{1}, Coimbra, Faro, Lisbon, Porto^{1}, Sintra^{1}
- Russia: Sochi and Tuapse on the coast of Krasnodar Krai
- San Marino (lower areas are borderline)
- Slovenia: Koper^{2}
- Spain: A Coruña^{1}, Alicante, Almería, Balearic Islands, Barcelona, Bilbao^{1}, Cádiz, Córdoba, Gijón^{1}, Granada, Huesca^{2}, Logroño, Madrid, Málaga, Mérida, Murcia, San Sebastián^{1}, Santander^{1}, Seville, Toledo, Valencia, Vigo^{1}, Zaragoza
- United Kingdom: Bailiwick of Guernsey^{3}, Isles of Scilly^{3}, Jersey^{3}, Penzance^{3}, Ventnor^{3}
- Vatican City

== Oceania ==
^{^1Only in Trewartha's classification.}
^{^2Borderline.}
^{^3Which borders on a fully tropical climate.}

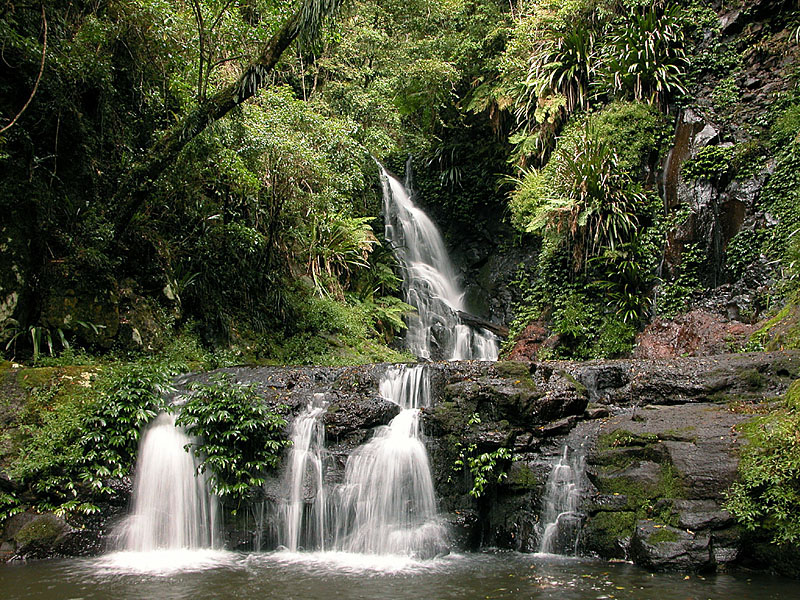
Elabana Falls in Lamington National Park, Queensland

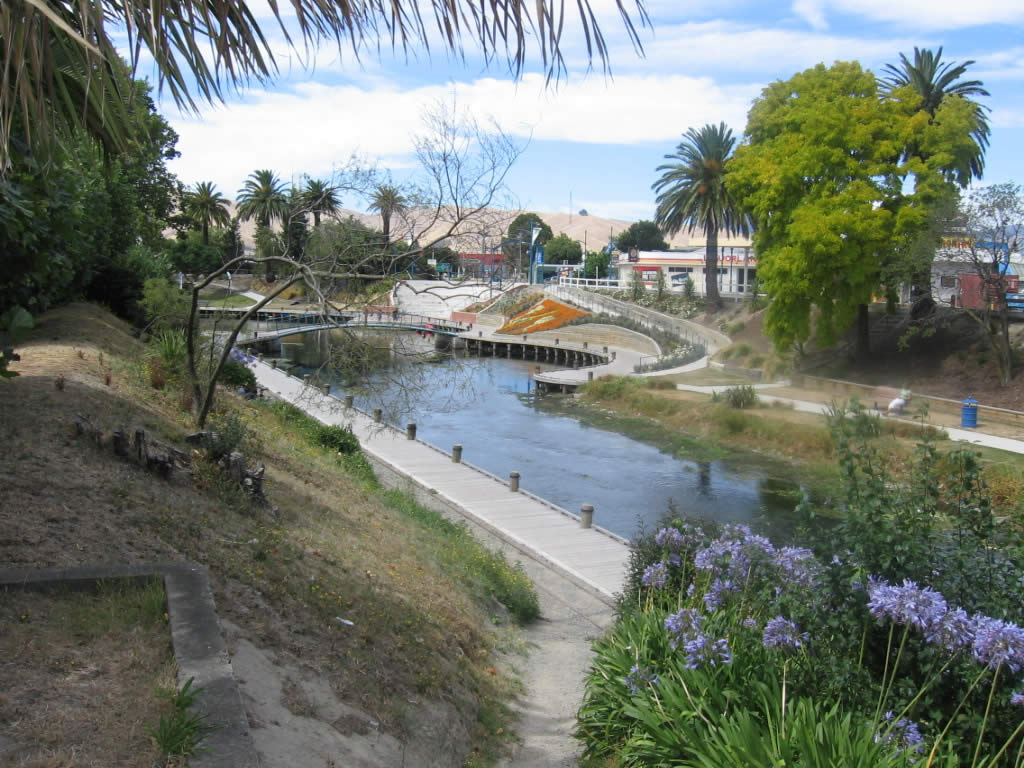
Blenheim, South Island, New Zealand

- Australia: New South Wales (though not most of the Tablelands and Highland regions), Jervis Bay Territory, lower elevations of Australian Capital Territory (Canberra is borderline only in Trewartha's classification), parts of Queensland and Western Australia, most of South Australia and Victoria, and Alice Springs in the Northern Territory. Major cities in Australia include Sydney, Melbourne^{1}, Perth, Brisbane, and Adelaide. Also Lord Howe Island and Norfolk Island in the Pacific; coastal Tasmania including Hobart^{1} and Launceston^{1}; and Mount Isa and Rockhampton, Queensland.
- Indonesia: Jayawijaya Mountains^{1}, Malino^{1} ^{3}, Mamasa^{1} Regency
- New Zealand: Auckland^{1}, Blenheim^{1}, Chatham Islands^{1} ^{2}, central Christchurch^{1}, Gisborne^{1}, Hamilton^{1}, Hokitika^{1}, Kaikoura^{1}, Kaitaia^{1}, Kermadec Islands, Masterton^{1}, Napier^{1}, Nelson^{1}, New Plymouth^{1}, Palmerston North^{1}, Rotorua^{1},Tauranga^{1}, Wellington^{1}, Westport^{1}, Whanganui^{1}, Whangarei^{1}.
- Papua New Guinea: Goroka^{1}, Kainantu^{1}, Wabag^{1}
- United States: Highlands of the Hawaiian Islands including Volcano^{1}

== Southern Indian Ocean ==
^{^1Only in Trewartha's classification.}

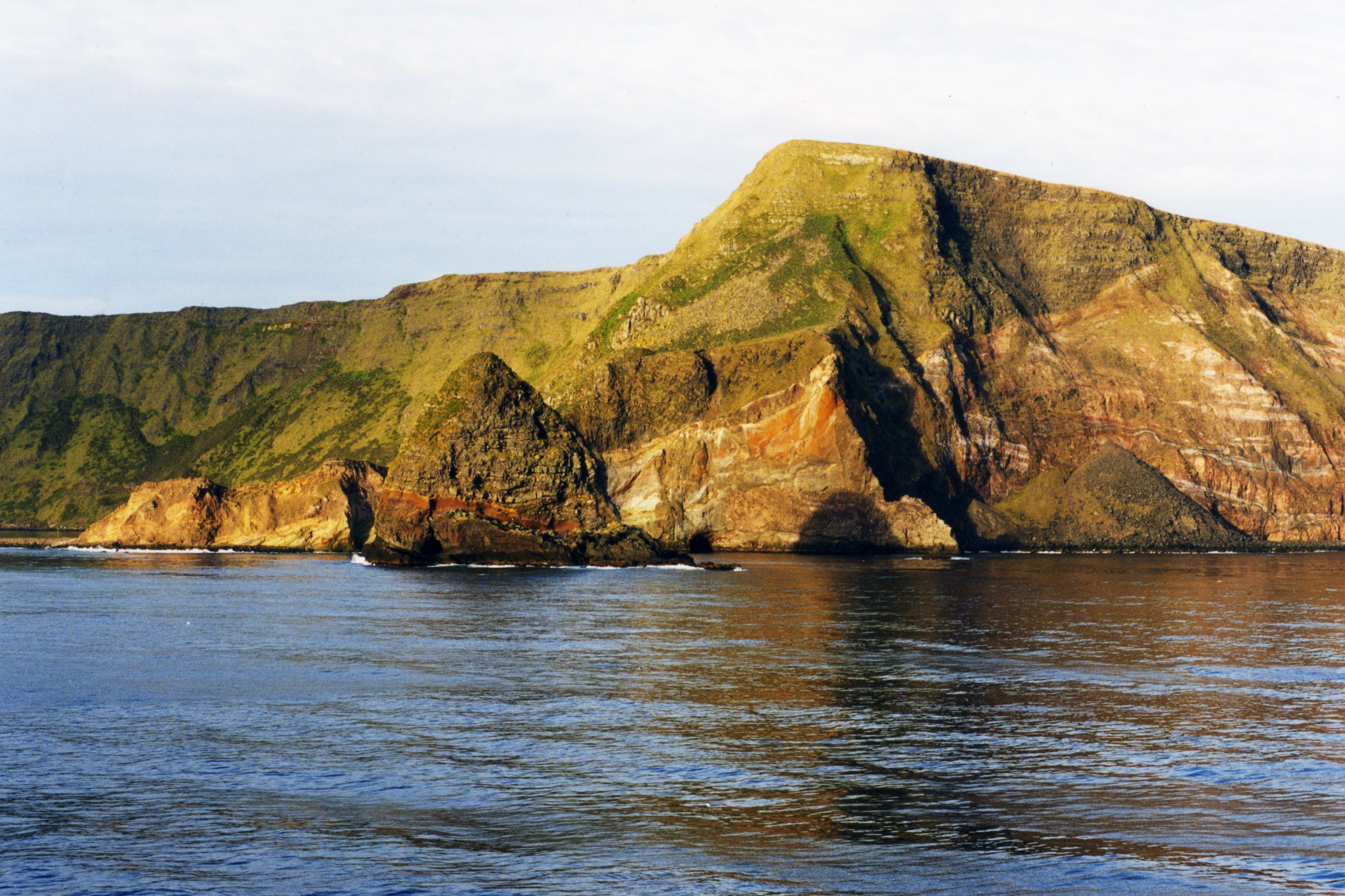
Île Saint-Paul

- French Southern and Antarctic Lands: Île Amsterdam^{1} , Île Saint-Paul^{1}
