= Humid subtropical climate =

Transitional climatic zone

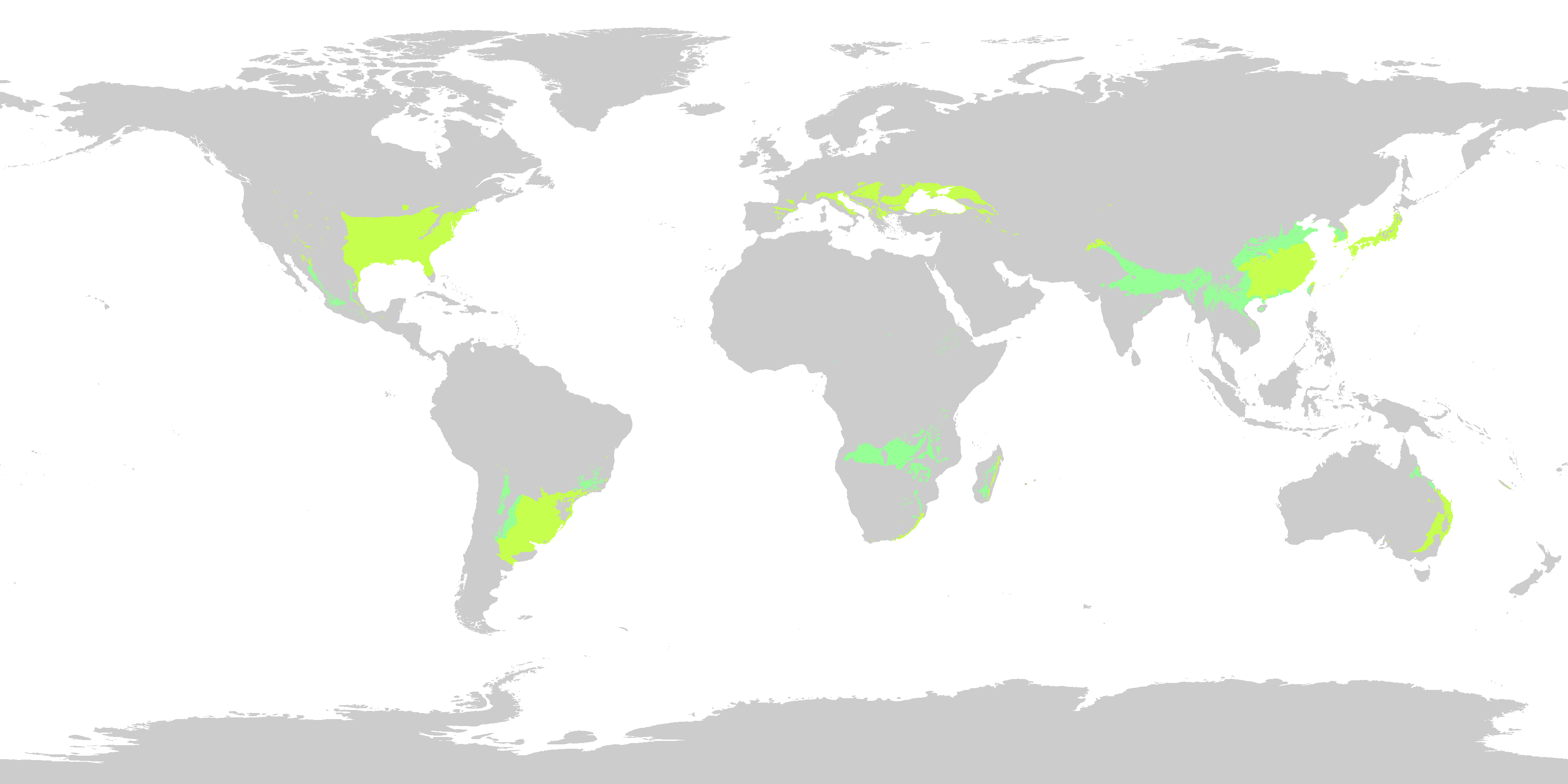
Warm temperate with hot summer climate zones of the world 1991-2020 according to a Köppen climate classification using a threshold of −3 °C (27 °F) for the coldest month Humid subtropical climate (Cfa) Monsoon-influenced humid subtropical climate (Cwa)

A humid subtropical climate is a temperate climate type, characterized by long and hot summers, and cool to mild winters. These climates normally lie on the southeast side of all continents (except Antarctica), generally between latitudes 25° and 40° and are located poleward from adjacent tropical climates, and equatorward from either humid continental (in North America and Asia) or oceanic climates (in other continents). It is also known as warm temperate climate in some climate classifications.

Under the Köppen climate classification, Cfa and Cwa climates are either described as humid subtropical climates or warm temperate climates. This climate features mean temperature in the coldest month between −3 °C (27 °F) (or 0 °C (32 °F)) and 18 °C (64 °F) and mean temperature in the warmest month 22 °C (72 °F) or higher. However, while some climatologists have opted to describe this climate type as a "humid subtropical climate", Köppen himself never used this term. The humid subtropical climate classification was officially created under the Trewartha climate classification. In this classification, climates are termed humid subtropical when they have at least 8 months with a mean temperature above 10 °C (50 °F).

While many subtropical climates tend to be located at or near coastal locations, in some cases, they extend inland, most notably in China and the United States, where they exhibit more pronounced seasonal variations and sharper contrasts between summer and winter, as part of a gradient between the hotter tropical climates of the southern coasts and the colder continental climates to the north and further inland. As such, the climate can be said to exhibit somewhat different features depending on whether it is found inland, or in a maritime position.

== Characteristics ==
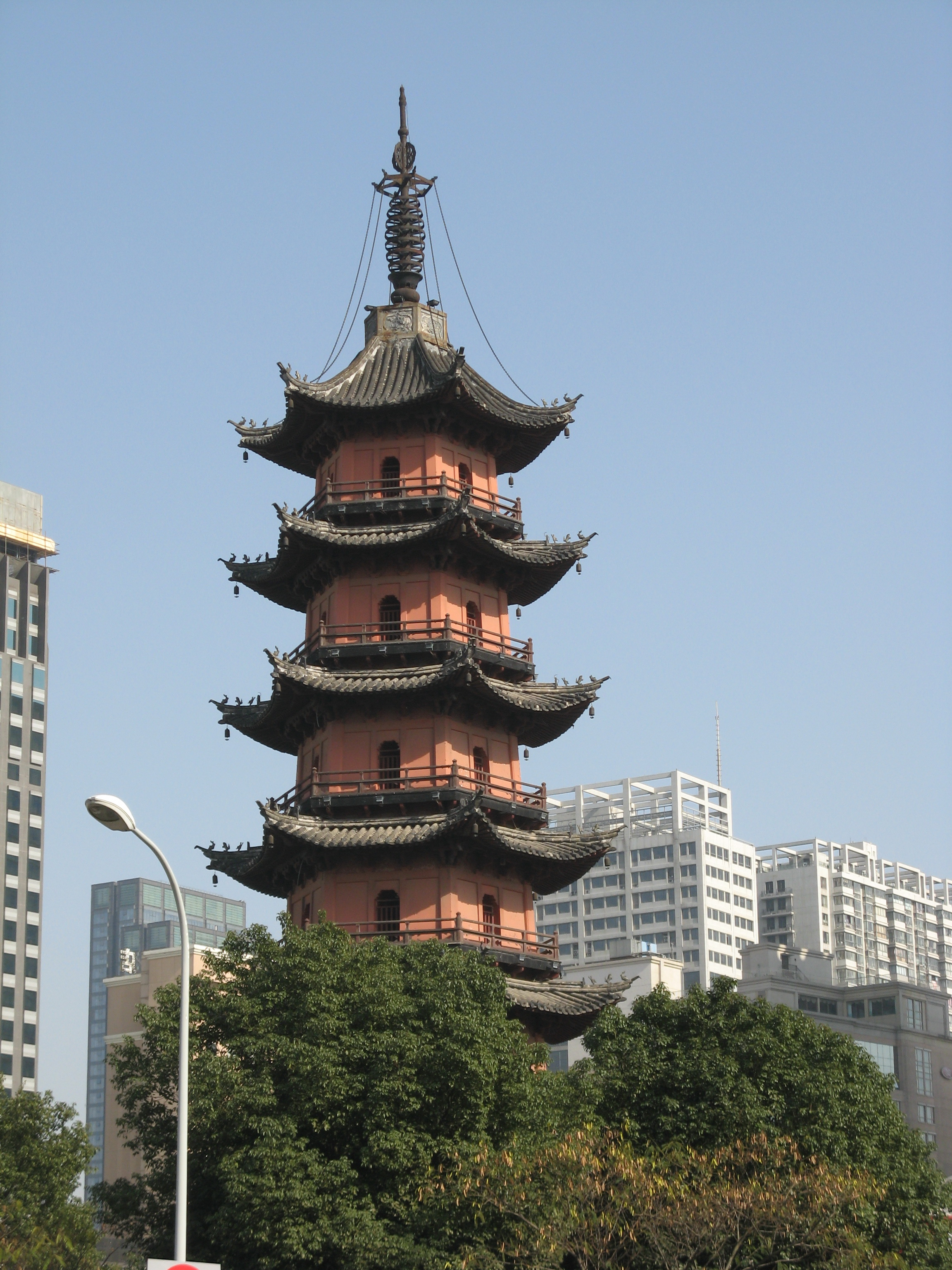
Tianfeng Tower, in Ningbo, a humid subtropical climate city in China.

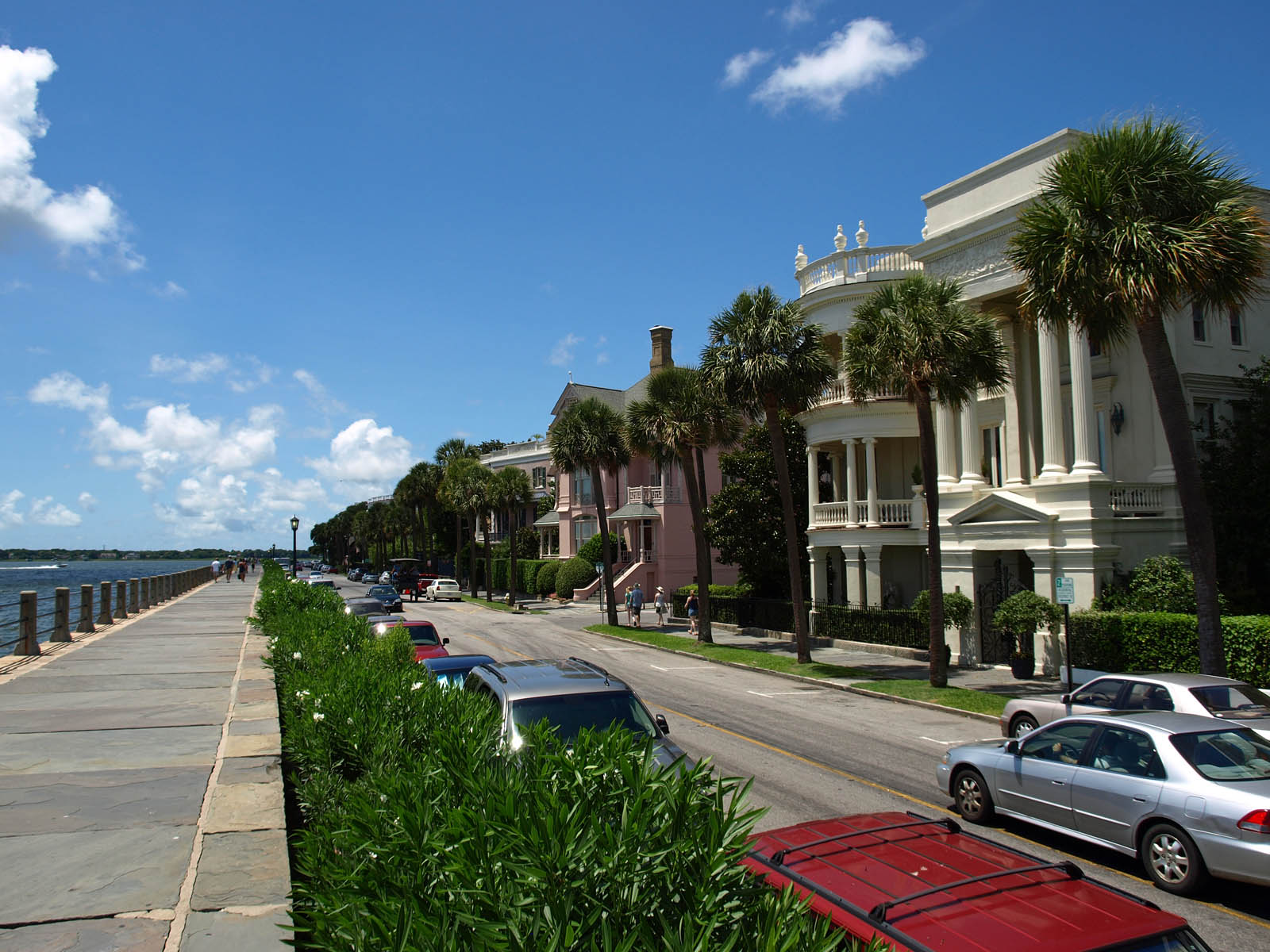
Charleston, South Carolina, a humid subtropical climate city in the US.

In a humid subtropical climate, summers are typically long, hot and humid. A deep current of tropical air dominates the humid subtropics at the time of high sun, and daily intense (but brief) convective thundershowers are common. Monthly mean temperatures in winter are normally mild, however they may be cold at the northern edges of the humid subtropical zone.

Rainfall often shows a summer peak in most humid subtropical climates, especially where there is a well developed monsoon (seasonal reversal of winds) such as in South Asia. Most summer rainfall occurs during thunderstorms that build up due to the intense surface heating and strong subtropical sun angle. Weak tropical lows that move in from adjacent warm tropical oceans, as well as occasional tropical cyclones often contribute to summer seasonal rainfall peaks such as occurs in the US state of Florida as well as eastern Australia. Normally, winter is a drier season in most humid subtropical climates, however, some higher latitude subtropical climates in North America, East Asia, and Europe, also have modest precipitation in winter as well.

Under the Holdridge life zones classification, the subtropical climates have a biotemperature between the frost or critical temperature line, 16 to 18 °C (61 to 64 °F) (depending on locations in the world) and 24 °C (75 °F), and these climates are humid (or even perhumid or superhumid) when the potential evapotranspiration (PET) ratio (= PET / Precipitation) is less than 1. In the Holdridge classification, the humid subtropical climates of the Koppen system coincide more or less with the subtropical and warm temperate life zones.

=== Breakdown of letters ===
Cfa: C = Mild temperate f = Fully humid a = Hot summer

Cwa: C = Mild temperate w = Dry winter a = Hot summer

== Locations ==
=== Africa ===
Durban, South Africa

Climate chart (precipitation, max. and min. temperature)
J	F	M	A	M	J	J	A	S	O	N	D
134 28 21	113 28 21	120 28 20	73 26 17	59 25 14	38 23 11	39 23 11	62 23 13	73 23 15	98 24 17	108 25 18	102 27 20
- █ Average max. and min. temperatures in °C
- █ Precipitation totals in mm
Imperial conversion
J	F	M	A	M	J	J	A	S	O	N	D
5.3 82 70	4.4 82 70	4.7 82 68	2.9 79 63	2.3 76 57	1.5 73 51	1.5 73 51	2.4 73 55	2.9 74 60	3.9 75 62	4.3 77 65	4 80 68
- █ Average max. and min. temperatures in °F
- █ Precipitation totals in inches

In Africa, humid subtropical climates are primarily found in the southeastern part of the continent. The Cwa climate is found over a large portion of the interior of the Middle and Eastern African regions. This area includes central Angola, northeastern Zimbabwe, the Niassa, Manica and Tete provinces of Mozambique, the southern Congo provinces, southwest Tanzania, and the majority of Malawi, and Zambia. Some lower portions of the Ethiopian Highlands also have this climate.

The climate is also found in the narrow coastal sections of southern and eastern South Africa, primarily in KwaZulu-Natal and the Eastern Cape provinces. South Africa's version of this climate features heavy oceanic influences resulting in generally milder temperatures. This is particularly evident in its winters when temperatures do not drop as low as in many other regions within the humid subtropical category.

=== Asia ===
==== East Asia ====
Tokyo, Japan

Climate chart (precipitation, max. and min. temperature)
J	F	M	A	M	J	J	A	S	O	N	D
52 10 1	56 10 2	118 14 4	125 19 9	138 23 14	168 26 18	154 29 22	168 31 23	210 27 20	198 22 14	93 16 8	51 12 4
- █ Average max. and min. temperatures in °C
- █ Precipitation totals in mm
- Source: Japan Meteorological Administration
Imperial conversion
J	F	M	A	M	J	J	A	S	O	N	D
2.1 49 34	2.2 51 35	4.6 56 40	4.9 66 49	5.4 73 57	6.6 78 64	6 85 71	6.6 87 73	8.3 80 67	7.8 71 58	3.6 61 47	2 53 38
- █ Average max. and min. temperatures in °F
- █ Precipitation totals in inches

Guangzhou, China

Climate chart (precipitation, max. and min. temperature)
J	F	M	A	M	J	J	A	S	O	N	D
51 19 11	56 20 13	101 22 16	194 26 20	329 30 23	365 32 25	243 33 26	270 33 26	203 32 24	67 29 21	37 25 17	33 21 12
- █ Average max. and min. temperatures in °C
- █ Precipitation totals in mm
- Source: China Meteorological Administration
Imperial conversion
J	F	M	A	M	J	J	A	S	O	N	D
2 66 51	2.2 68 55	4 72 60	7.6 80 67	13 86 74	14 90 77	9.6 92 78	11 92 78	8 90 76	2.6 85 70	1.5 78 62	1.3 69 53
- █ Average max. and min. temperatures in °F
- █ Precipitation totals in inches

In East Asia, this climate type is found in the southeastern quarter of China from Hong Kong north to Nanjing, the northern half of Taiwan, southern and central Japan (Kyushu, Shikoku and half of Honshu), and the most southern regions of Korea (the south and east Central and Southern Gyeongsang Province and Jeju Island). Cities near the equatorward boundary of this zone include Hong Kong and Taichung; while Iida - Kōfu - Niigata - Sendai of Japan and Gwangju - Daegu - Gangneung - Sokcho of Korea and Qingdao are near the northern boundary.

The influence of the strong Siberian anticyclone in East Asia brings colder winter temperatures than in the humid subtropical zones in The Americas, South Asia, and Australia. The 0 °C (32 °F) isotherm reaches as far south as the valleys of the Yellow and Wei rivers, roughly latitude 34° N. At Hainan Island and in Taiwan, the climate transitions from subtropical into tropical. In most of this region, the winter monsoon is very well developed, as such eastern Asian humid subtropical zones have a strong winter dry season and heavy summer rainfall.

Only in inland areas below the Yangtze River and coastal areas between approximately the Huai River and the beginning of the coast of Guangdong is there sufficient winter rainfall to produce a Cfa climate; even in these areas, rainfall and streamflow display a highly pronounced summer peak, unlike other regions of this climate type. Drought can be severe and often catastrophic to agriculture in the Cwa zone.

The only area where winter precipitation equals or even exceeds the summer rain is around the San'in region at the western coast of Japan, which during winter is on the windward side of the westerlies. The winter precipitation in these regions is usually produced by low-pressure systems off the east coast that develop in the onshore flow from the Siberian high. Summer rainfall comes from the East Asian Monsoon and from frequent typhoons. Annual rainfall is generally over 1,000 millimetres (39 in), and in areas below the Himalayas can be much higher still.

==== South Asia ====
New Delhi, India

Climate chart (precipitation, max. and min. temperature)
J	F	M	A	M	J	J	A	S	O	N	D
19 20 7	20 23 10	15 29 15	21 36 21	25 39 25	70 39 27	237 35 27	235 34 26	113 34 25	17 33 19	9 28 13	9 23 9
- █ Average max. and min. temperatures in °C
- █ Precipitation totals in mm
- Source: NOAA
Imperial conversion
J	F	M	A	M	J	J	A	S	O	N	D
0.7 69 45	0.8 74 50	0.6 85 60	0.8 97 70	1 103 76	2.8 102 81	9.3 94 80	9.3 92 79	4.4 94 76	0.7 91 67	0.4 83 56	0.4 73 47
- █ Average max. and min. temperatures in °F
- █ Precipitation totals in inches

Chandigarh, India

Climate chart (precipitation, max. and min. temperature)
J	F	M	A	M	J	J	A	S	O	N	D
38 18 7	37 23 10	27 28 15	18 35 20	27 39 25	147 38 27	276 34 27	273 33 26	155 33 24	14 32 18	5.2 27 12	22 22 8
- █ Average max. and min. temperatures in °C
- █ Precipitation totals in mm
- Source: NOAA
Imperial conversion
J	F	M	A	M	J	J	A	S	O	N	D
1.5 65 45	1.5 73 51	1.1 82 58	0.7 94 69	1.1 101 76	5.8 100 80	11 93 80	11 92 79	6.1 91 76	0.6 90 65	0.2 81 54	0.9 72 46
- █ Average max. and min. temperatures in °F
- █ Precipitation totals in inches

Humid subtropical climates can also be found in the Indian subcontinent, predominantly in the northern regions. However, the humid subtropical climates exhibited here typically differ markedly from those in East Asia (and, for that matter, much of the globe). Winters (December–February) are typically cool to mild (sometimes reaching 0 °C (32 °F), and ranging from humid and foggy in December to dry in February. These winters are followed by a mild spring (March–April), often accompanied by hail in the northwestern regions. Summers tend to be relatively longer and very hot, starting from mid-April and peaking in June, with high temperatures often exceeding 40 °C (104 °F). Summers usually begin dry, complete with dust storms, traits typically associated with arid or semi-arid climates, before eventually transforming into a more humid and stormy June. This is followed by the cooler but still hot and extremely humid monsoon season (July–September), where the region experiences heavy rains almost daily, with humidity usually above 90%. The autumn season (October–November), which immediately follows the monsoon and precedes winter, usually experiences a pleasant climate. Cities such as New Delhi, Dehradun, Lucknow, Kanpur and Chandigarh, among others, exhibit this atypical version of the climate in India. In Pakistan, the cities of Islamabad, Sialkot, Gujranwala and Rawalpindi, among others, feature this weather pattern. Lahore and New Delhi are humid subtropical with some semi-arid influences as they receive slightly less annual rainfall compared to a typical humid subtropical climate at 747 mm and 790 mm respectively.

In Bangladesh, humid subtropical climates are commonly present in the northern half (north of Dhaka). Cities like Rajshahi, Rangpur, Saidpur and Dinajpur in the northern region feature the monsoon variant (Cwa), where rainfall peaks at the monsoon season. Closely resembling the climate patterns of the neighboring Indo-Gangetic Plains, this region shows a distinct three-season pattern: a relatively dry and very hot summer (March–May), extremely wet, cooler monsoon season (June–September), and mild, foggy winter (December–February), with a post-monsoon/autumn transition season (October–November)

Humid subtropical climates can also be found in Nepal. However, the Nepalese version of the climate generally does not feature the extreme hot spells that are commonplace for many other South Asian locations with this climate. In Nepal cities such as Kathmandu, Pokhara, Butwal, Birgunj and Biratnagar feature this iteration of the climate.

In South Asia, humid subtropical climates generally border on continental climates as altitude increases, or on a Mediterranean climate in western areas of Pakistan and northwestern India (e.g. Peshawar in northwestern Pakistan or Srinagar in the Kashmir Valley in India, where the primary precipitation peak occurs in March, not July or August). Further east, in highland areas with lengthier monsoons such as Nepal, seasonal temperature variation is lower than in the lowlands. Further west, moving closer to the Bagar and Great Indian Desert, the climate begins to shift towards a hot semi-arid climate.

==== Southeast Asia ====
Hanoi, Vietnam

Climate chart (precipitation, max. and min. temperature)
J	F	M	A	M	J	J	A	S	O	N	D
23 19 14	25 20 16	47 23 18	92 28 22	185 32 25	253 33 26	280 33 27	309 33 26	228 32 25	141 29 23	67 26 19	20 22 16
- █ Average max. and min. temperatures in °C
- █ Precipitation totals in mm
- Source: Vietnam Institute for Building Science and Technology
Imperial conversion
J	F	M	A	M	J	J	A	S	O	N	D
0.9 67 58	1 69 60	1.9 74 65	3.6 82 71	7.3 89 77	10 92 80	11 92 80	12 91 79	9 89 77	5.5 85 73	2.6 78 67	0.8 72 60
- █ Average max. and min. temperatures in °F
- █ Precipitation totals in inches

In Southeast Asia, about 90% of the region has a tropical climate; but humid subtropical climates can also be seen here, such as in Northern Vietnam.

Southeast Asian locations with these climates can feature cool temperatures, with lows reaching 10 °C (50 °F) during the months of December, January, and February. Unlike a good portion of East Asian locations with this climate however, most of Southeast Asia seldom experiences snowfall. These areas tend to feature hot and wet summers and cool and dry winters, with mean temperatures varying between 25 and 30 °C (77 and 86 °F) in summer.

==== Western Asia ====
Kutaisi, Georgia

Climate chart (precipitation, max. and min. temperature)
J	F	M	A	M	J	J	A	S	O	N	D
106 8 1	129 9 2	100 13 5	112 18 8	85 23 12	105 26 16	106 28 19	86 29 20	116 26 16	108 21 12	141 15 8	139 10 4
- █ Average max. and min. temperatures in °C
- █ Precipitation totals in mm
Imperial conversion
J	F	M	A	M	J	J	A	S	O	N	D
4.2 46 34	5.1 48 35	3.9 56 40	4.4 65 46	3.3 74 54	4.1 80 61	4.2 83 66	3.4 84 67	4.6 78 61	4.3 70 53	5.6 59 46	5.5 51 38
- █ Average max. and min. temperatures in °F
- █ Precipitation totals in inches

Although humid subtropical climates in Asia are mostly confined to the southeastern quarter of the continent, there are two narrow areas along the coast of the Caspian Sea and Black Sea with humid subtropical climates. Summers in these locations are cooler than typical humid subtropical climates and snowfall in winter is relatively common, but is usually of a short duration.

In Western Asia, the climate is prevalent in the Gilan, Māzandarān and Golestan Provinces of Iran, in parts of the Caucasus, in Azerbaijan and in Georgia wedged between the Caspian and Black seas and coastal (Black Sea) Turkey, albeit having more oceanic influence.

Annual rainfall ranges from around 600 millimetres (24 in) at Gorgan to over 1,830 millimetres (72 in) at Bandar-e Anzali, and is heavy throughout the year, with a maximum in October or November when Bandar-e Anzali can average 330 millimetres (13 in) in one month. Temperatures are generally moderate in comparison with other parts of Western Asia. During winter, the coastal areas can receive snowfall, which is usually of a short duration.

In Rasht, the average temperature in July and August is around 25 °C (77 °F) but with near-saturation humidity, whilst in January and February it is around 7 °C (45 °F). The heavy, evenly distributed rainfall extends north into the Caspian coastal strip of Azerbaijan up to its northern border but this climate in Azerbaijan is, however, a Cfb/Cfa (Oceanic climate/Humid subtropical climate) borderline case.

Western Georgia (Batumi and Kutaisi) in the Kolkheti Lowland and the northeast coast of Turkey (Giresun), have a climate similar to that of Gilan and Mazandaran in Iran and very similar to that of southeastern and northern Azerbaijan. Temperatures range from 22 °C (72 °F) in summer to 5 °C (41 °F) in winter and rainfall is even heavier than in Caspian Iran, up to 2,300 millimetres (91 in) per year in Hopa (Turkey). These climates are a Cfb/Cfa (Oceanic climate/Humid subtropical climate) borderline case.

=== North America ===
Houston, United States

Climate chart (precipitation, max. and min. temperature)
J	F	M	A	M	J	J	A	S	O	N	D
86 17 6	81 19 8	87 23 11	84 26 15	129 30 20	151 33 23	96 34 24	96 35 24	105 32 21	145 28 16	110 23 11	95 18 7
- █ Average max. and min. temperatures in °C
- █ Precipitation totals in mm
Imperial conversion
J	F	M	A	M	J	J	A	S	O	N	D
3.4 63 43	3.2 66 47	3.4 73 53	3.3 80 59	5.1 86 68	5.9 91 74	3.8 94 75	3.8 94 75	4.1 90 70	5.7 82 61	4.3 73 52	3.7 64 45
- █ Average max. and min. temperatures in °F
- █ Precipitation totals in inches

Washington, D.C., United States

Climate chart (precipitation, max. and min. temperature)
J	F	M	A	M	J	J	A	S	O	N	D
73 7 −1	67 9 0	89 14 4	82 20 9	100 25 14	107 30 20	110 32 22	83 31 22	100 27 18	93 21 11	74 15 5	87 9 1
- █ Average max. and min. temperatures in °C
- █ Precipitation totals in mm
Imperial conversion
J	F	M	A	M	J	J	A	S	O	N	D
2.9 45 30	2.6 48 32	3.5 56 39	3.2 68 48	3.9 76 58	4.2 85 67	4.3 90 72	3.3 88 71	3.9 81 64	3.7 69 52	2.9 58 42	3.4 49 35
- █ Average max. and min. temperatures in °F
- █ Precipitation totals in inches

In North America, humid subtropical climates are found in the American Gulf and lower East Coast states, including Alabama, Arkansas, Florida, Georgia, Louisiana, Mississippi, North Carolina, Oklahoma, South Carolina, Tennessee, and Texas. On the Florida peninsula, the humid subtropical climate gives way to the tropical climate of South Florida and the Florida Keys.

Under Köppen's climate classification, this zone includes locations further north, primarily Virginia, Kentucky, the lower elevations of West Virginia, Maryland, Delaware, Washington, D.C., southeastern Pennsylvania, central and southern portions of New Jersey, and Downstate New York. It can also be found in the lower Midwest, primarily in the central and southern portions of Kansas and Missouri and the southern portions of Illinois, Indiana and Ohio.

In Mexico, there are small areas of Cfa and Cwa climates. The climate can be found in small areas scattered around the northeastern part of the country, in proximity to the Gulf of Mexico. Other areas where the climate can be found is in the high elevations of Trans-Mexican Volcanic Belt and Sierra Madre Oriental. Despite being located at higher elevations, these locations have summers that are too warm to qualify as a subtropical highland climate. Guadalajara's climate is a major example of this.

Outside of isolated sections of Mexico, the southernmost limits of this climate zone in North America lie just north of South Florida and around southern coastal Texas. Cities at the southernmost limits, such as Tampa and Orlando and along the Texas coast around Corpus Christi down toward Brownsville generally feature warm weather year-round and minimal temperature differences between seasons. In contrast, cities at the northernmost limits of the climate zone such as New York City, Philadelphia and Louisville feature hot, humid summers and chilly winters. These areas have average winter temperatures at the coldest limit of climates classed as humid subtropical. The climate can also be found in small areas scattered around the northeastern part Mexico, in proximity to the Gulf of Mexico.

Snowfall varies greatly in this climate zone. In locations at the southern limits of this zone and areas around the Gulf Coast, cities such as Orlando, Tampa, Houston, New Orleans, and Savannah rarely see snowfall, which occurs, at most, a few times per generation. In cities farther north or inland, such as Atlanta, Charlotte, Dallas, Memphis, Nashville, and Raleigh, snow only occasionally falls and is usually three inches or less. However, for the majority of the winter here, temperatures remain above or well above freezing. At the northernmost limits of this zone, cities such as New York City, Philadelphia, Baltimore, Washington, D.C., and Louisville typically see snowfall during the winter, with occasional heavy snowstorms. Still, average temperatures during a typical winter hover just above freezing at these locations.

Precipitation is plentiful in North America's humid subtropical climate zone – but with significant variations in terms of wettest/driest months and seasons. Locations on the northern edge of the zone such as the Jersey Shore, and Northern Kentucky typically features relatively consistent precipitation patterns throughout the course of the year. In contrast, much of the interior Southern United States, including Tennessee, sections of Kentucky, and the northern halves of Mississippi and Alabama, tends to have a winter or spring (not summer) precipitation maximum. Closer to the Atlantic and Gulf coasts, there is a summer maximum, with July or August usually the wettest month – such as in Jacksonville, Charleston, Mobile, New Orleans, and Virginia Beach. A semblance of a monsoon pattern (dry winters/wet summers) is evident along the Atlantic coast from the Chesapeake Bay region and the Outer Banks south to Florida. The seasonal monsoon is much stronger on the Florida peninsula, as most locations in Florida have dry winters and wet summers.

In addition, areas in Texas that are slightly inland from the Gulf of Mexico, such as Austin and San Antonio that border the semi-arid climate zone, generally see a peak of precipitation in May, a drought-like nadir in mid-summer and a secondary, if not equal, precipitation peak in September or October. Areas further south along South Texas' Gulf Coast (Brownsville), which closely border tropical climate classification, typically have a strong September precipitation maximum, and a tendency toward dry conditions in winter with rain increasing in spring, with December or January often the driest months.

Bermuda is an archipelago in the western Atlantic Ocean with a Cfa climate closely bordering tropical. Despite the mildness of the winters, temperatures above 90° F (32.2° C) in Bermuda are rare due to being far from hot land-based air masses.

=== Central America ===
Siguatepeque, Honduras

Climate chart (precipitation, max. and min. temperature)
J	F	M	A	M	J	J	A	S	O	N	D
60 22 14	31 25 16	27 29 17	52 31 19	94 31 21	100 30 21	122 30 20	108 29 18	103 29 18	100 26 18	100 23 16	90 22 14
- █ Average max. and min. temperatures in °C
- █ Precipitation totals in mm
- Source: WeatherSpark(https://es.weatherspark.com/y/13741/Clima-promedio-en-El-Socorro-Honduras-durante-todo-el-a%C3%B1o)
Imperial conversion
J	F	M	A	M	J	J	A	S	O	N	D
2.4 71 58	1.2 78 61	1.1 84 62	2 88 66	3.7 87 69	4 86 69	4.8 86 69	4.2 84 65	4.1 84 64	4 78 64	4 73 61	3.5 71 56
- █ Average max. and min. temperatures in °F
- █ Precipitation totals in inches

In Central America there are small areas of Cfa and Cwa climates. Areas where the climate can be found is in the high elevations of Trans-Mexican Volcanic Belt and Sierra Madre Oriental. Despite being located at higher elevations, these locations have summers that are too warm to qualify as a subtropical highland climate. These highland areas feature summer temperatures that are warm enough to fall outside the subtropical highland climate category Cw.

=== South America ===
Buenos Aires, Argentina

Climate chart (precipitation, max. and min. temperature)
J	F	M	A	M	J	J	A	S	O	N	D
139 30 20	127 29 19	140 27 18	119 23 14	92 19 11	59 16 8	61 15 7	64 18 9	72 19 10	127 23 13	117 26 16	119 29 18
- █ Average max. and min. temperatures in °C
- █ Precipitation totals in mm
- Source: National Meteorological Service
Imperial conversion
J	F	M	A	M	J	J	A	S	O	N	D
5.5 86 68	5 84 67	5.5 80 64	4.7 73 57	3.6 67 51	2.3 61 47	2.4 60 45	2.5 64 48	2.8 67 51	5 73 56	4.6 78 61	4.7 83 65
- █ Average max. and min. temperatures in °F
- █ Precipitation totals in inches

Humid subtropical climates are found in a sizable portion of southeastern South America. The climate extends over a few states of southern Brazil, including Paraná, into sections of Paraguay, all of Uruguay and central Argentina (Pampas region). Major cities such as São Paulo, Asunción, Buenos Aires, Porto Alegre and Montevideo have a humid subtropical climate, generally in the form of hot and humid summers, and mild to cool winters. These areas, which include the Pampas, generally feature a Cfa climate categorization. At 38°S, the Argentine city of Bahía Blanca lies on the southern limit of the humid subtropical zone.

The Cwa climate occurs in parts of tropical highlands of Minas Gerais, Rio de Janeiro, Mato Grosso do Sul and near the Andean highland in northwestern Argentina. These highland areas feature summer temperatures that are warm enough to fall outside the subtropical highland climate category.

=== Australia ===
Brisbane, Queensland

Climate chart (precipitation, max. and min. temperature)
J	F	M	A	M	J	J	A	S	O	N	D
154 30 21	161 30 21	139 29 20	91 27 17	78 25 14	69 22 12	54 22 10	44 23 11	44 26 14	78 27 16	99 28 19	130 29 20
- █ Average max. and min. temperatures in °C
- █ Precipitation totals in mm
Imperial conversion
J	F	M	A	M	J	J	A	S	O	N	D
6.1 86 70	6.3 86 70	5.5 84 68	3.6 81 63	3.1 77 57	2.7 72 54	2.1 72 50	1.7 73 52	1.7 79 57	3.1 81 61	3.9 82 66	5.1 84 68
- █ Average max. and min. temperatures in °F
- █ Precipitation totals in inches

The humid subtropical climate dominates a few major cities in Australia, namely Sydney, Brisbane, and the Gold Coast. This climate zone predominantly lies in eastern Australia, which begins from the coastal strip of Mackay, Queensland and stretches down the coast to just south of Sydney, where it transitions into the cooler, oceanic climates.

From Newcastle, 117 km northeast of Sydney, the Cfa zone would extend to inland New South Wales, excluding the highland regions (which have an oceanic climate), stretching towards Dubbo to the northwest and Wagga Wagga to the south, ending at the New South Wales/Victoria border (Albury-Wodonga). To note, these places would have characteristics of the semi-arid and/or Mediterranean climates. Furthermore, the inland Cfa climates generally have drier summers, or at least summers with low humidity.

Extreme heat is more often experienced in Sydney than in other large cities in Australia's Cfa zone, especially in the western suburbs, where highs over 40 °C (104 °F) are not uncommon. Frost is prevalent in the more inland areas of Sydney, such as Richmond. Average annual rainfall in the Sydney region ranges between 800 and 1,200 millimetres (31 and 47 in).

There is usually a distinct summer rainfall maximum that becomes more pronounced moving northwards. In Brisbane, the wettest month (February) receives five times the rainfall of the driest month (September). Temperatures are very warm to hot but are not excessive: the average maximum in February is usually around 29 °C (84 °F) and in July around 21 °C (70 °F). Frosts are extremely rare except at higher elevations, but temperatures over 35 °C (95 °F) are not common on the coast.

North of the Cfa climate zone there is a zone centred upon Rockhampton which extends north to the Köppen Cwa classified climate zone of the Atherton Tablelands region. This region has a very pronounced dry winter period, with often negligible rainfall between June and October. Winter temperatures generally only fall slightly below 18 °C (64 °F), which would classify the region as a tropical savanna, or Aw, climate.

Annual rainfall within Australia's humid subtropical climate zone can reach as high as 2,000 millimetres (79 in) in coastal locations and is generally 1,000 millimetres (39 in) or above. The most intense 2–3 day rainfall periods that occur in this coastal zone however are the outcome of east coast lows forming to the north of a large high pressure system. There can be great variation in rainfall amounts from year to year as a result of these systems. In the past century, the annual rainfall total in Sydney has recorded a low of 624.8mm in 1968 to a high of 2530.0mm in 2022

The climate of Lord Howe Island and Norfolk Island to the east of Australia is also Cfa, as is the climate of the Kermadec Islands to the northeast of New Zealand. Strong Pacific influences on these islands prevent extreme heat despite very mild winters.

=== Europe ===
Milan, Italy

Climate chart (precipitation, max. and min. temperature)
J	F	M	A	M	J	J	A	S	O	N	D
37 7 0	38 10 1	42 15 4	58 19 8	70 24 13	67 28 17	44 31 19	59 30 19	74 26 15	82 19 10	104 12 5	46 7 1
- █ Average max. and min. temperatures in °C
- █ Precipitation totals in mm
Imperial conversion
J	F	M	A	M	J	J	A	S	O	N	D
1.5 45 31	1.5 50 33	1.7 60 40	2.3 67 47	2.8 75 55	2.7 83 63	1.7 87 67	2.3 86 66	2.9 78 59	3.2 66 50	4.1 54 41	1.8 45 33
- █ Average max. and min. temperatures in °F
- █ Precipitation totals in inches

As the continent does not have a large ocean to its east as the case in many other continents within the climate zone, humid subtropical climates in Europe are limited to relatively small areas on the margins of the Mediterranean and Black Sea basins. Cfa zones are generally transitional between the Mediterranean climate zones along the coast and oceanic and humid continental zones to the west and north where rainfall in the warmer months is too high for a Mediterranean classification, while temperatures (either in the summer and/or winter) are too warm to qualify as oceanic or humid continental. Summer humidity is generally not as high here as in other continents within this climatic zone.

The Po Valley, in Northern Italy, including major cities such as Milan, Turin, Bologna, and Verona, has a humid subtropical climate, featuring hot, humid summers with frequent thunderstorms; winters are foggy, damp and chilly, with sudden bursts of frost. Places along the shores of Lake Maggiore, Lake Lugano, Lake Como (Como and Verbania in Italy and Lugano and Locarno in Switzerland) have a humid subtropical climate with a distinctively high amount of rainfall during summer. In France, the climate is found in parts of the Garonne Valley (city of Toulouse) and in the Rhône Valley, including the cities of Lyon and Valence. Due to climate change, some cities on the Balkan peninsula and in the Pannonian Basin such as Belgrade, Novi Sad, Niš and Budapest are now just warm enough to be categorized as such. At 48°N, the urban core of Vienna, in Austria and Bratislava, in Slovakia, lie on the northern limit of the humid subtropical zone.

The coastal areas in the northern half of the Adriatic Sea also fall within this climate zone. The cities include Trieste, Venice, and Rimini in Italy, Rijeka and Split in Croatia, Koper in Slovenia and Kotor in Montenegro. In Albania, this zone extends across the central and northwestern coastal plains and adjacent low-lying hills, culminating in the capital, Tirana, which is among the wettest cities in Europe. Other Cfa regions include the central valleys and coast of Catalonia of Girona and Barcelona in Spain, some on the north-east of Spain (Huesca), West Macedonia in Greece (Kozani).

Along the Black Sea coast of Bulgaria (Varna), coast of Romania (Constanța and Mamaia), Sochi, Russia and Crimea, have summers too warm (>22 °C (72 °F) mean temperature in the warmest month) to qualify as oceanic, no freezing month, and enough summer precipitation and sometimes humid conditions, where they would be fit to be classed under Cfa, though they closely border the humid continental zone due to colder winters. All these areas are subject to occasional, in some cases repeated snowfalls and freezes during winter.

In Central Europe, a small area of humid subtropical climates are located in transitional areas between the oceanic and continental climates in areas where higher summer temperatures do not quite qualify it for inclusion in the Oceanic climate schema and mild winters do not allow their inclusion into continental climates. Average summer temperatures in areas of Europe with this climate are generally not as hot as most other subtropical zones around the world. Urban examples include Bratislava, Budapest, and the Innere Stadt of Vienna.

In the Azores, some islands have this climate, with very mild and rainy winters (>13 °C (55 °F)) and no snowfall, warm summers (>21 °C (70 °F)) but with no dry season during the warmest period, which means that they can neither be classified as oceanic, nor as Mediterranean, only as humid subtropical, as with Corvo Island.

In many other climate classification systems outside of the Köppen, most of these locations would not be included in the humid subtropical grouping. The higher summer precipitation and poleward flow of tropical air-masses in summer are not present in Europe as they are in eastern Australia or the southern United States. Many of these locations in Central and Southern Europe are considered oceanic by Trewartha's classification.

== See also ==
- Subtropics
- Subtropical ridge
- List of locations with a subtropical climate
