= William Brooks Drew =

American botanist

William B. Drew
- Born: December 11, 1908
- Died: December 14, 1997 (aged 89)
- Education: Massachusetts Agricultural College; Harvard University
- Scientific career
- Fields: Botany
- Workplaces: Michigan State University
- Author abbrev. (botany): W.B.Drew

William Brooks Drew (December 11, 1908 – December 14, 1997) was an American botanist and professor.

== Career ==
Drew received his B.S. degree from Massachusetts Agricultural College in 1930. He pursued an M.A. from Harvard University, which he received in 1931. He returned to Harvard and earned his Ph.D. in 1934.

Drew started working as an Assistant at the Gray Herbarium while attending Harvard. In 1933, he signed on as a botanist for Louise A. Boyd's expedition of Greenland. At some point, Drew fell sick and Boyd was required to continue collecting plant specimens.

He returned in 1934, taking professorships at the Cambridge School of Liberal Arts and at the American International College. In 1943, Drew took part in the Cinchona Missions in Ecuador to help gather quinine to treat malaria in the armed forces during WWII. In 1945, he was hired as an associate professor in the department of botany and plant pathology at Michigan State College. He was promoted to head of the department in 1948. He retired in 1976.

== Legacy ==
The William P. Brooks, William B. Drew and Shirley Upton-Drew Memorial Fund is a scholarship at the University of Massachusetts Amherst named partially in Drew's honor.
