= Cinchona Missions =

United States effort to find natural sources of quinine

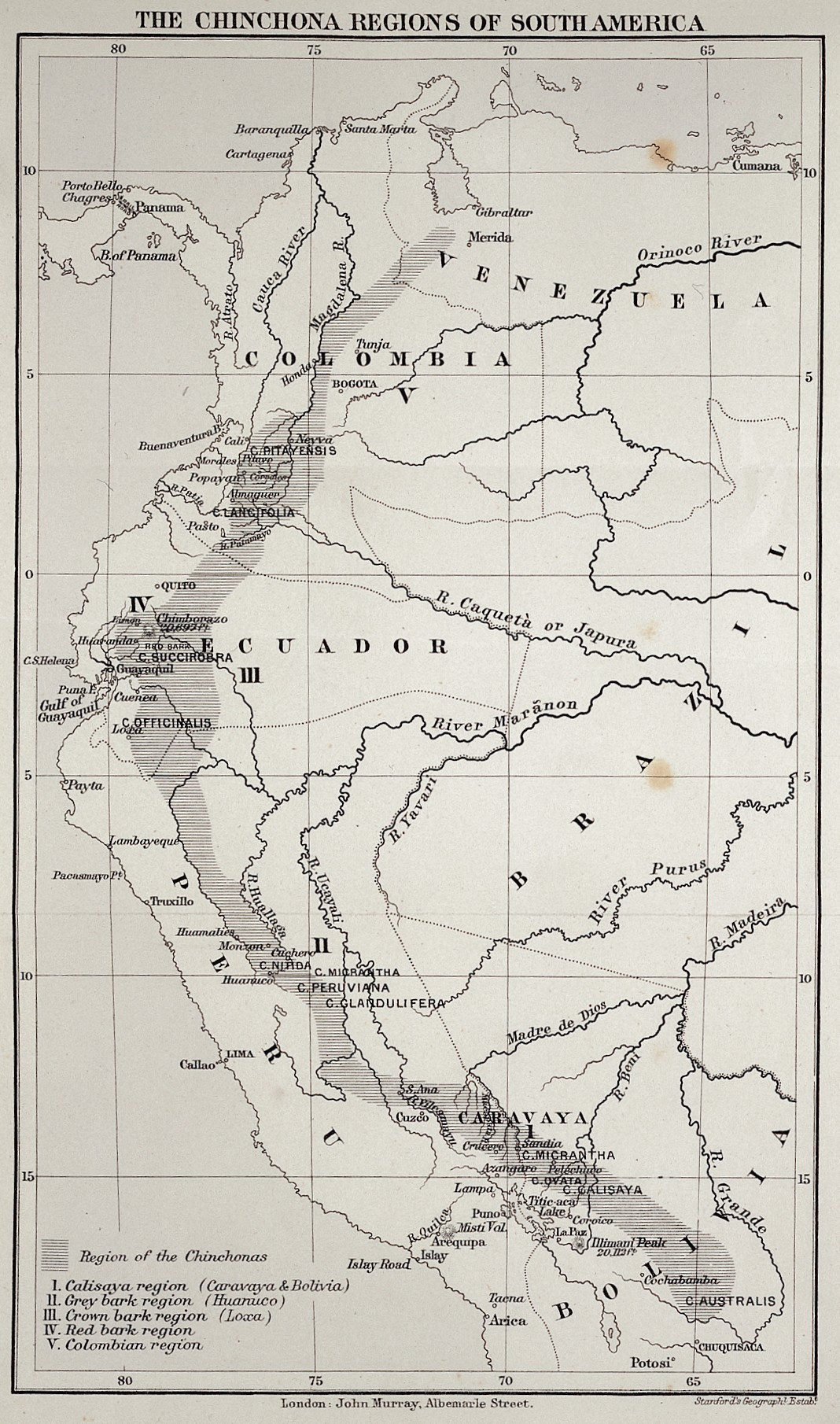
Map of the chinchona region of South America

The Cinchona Missions (1942–1945) were a series of expeditions led by the United States to find natural sources of quinine in South America during World War II.

== Background ==
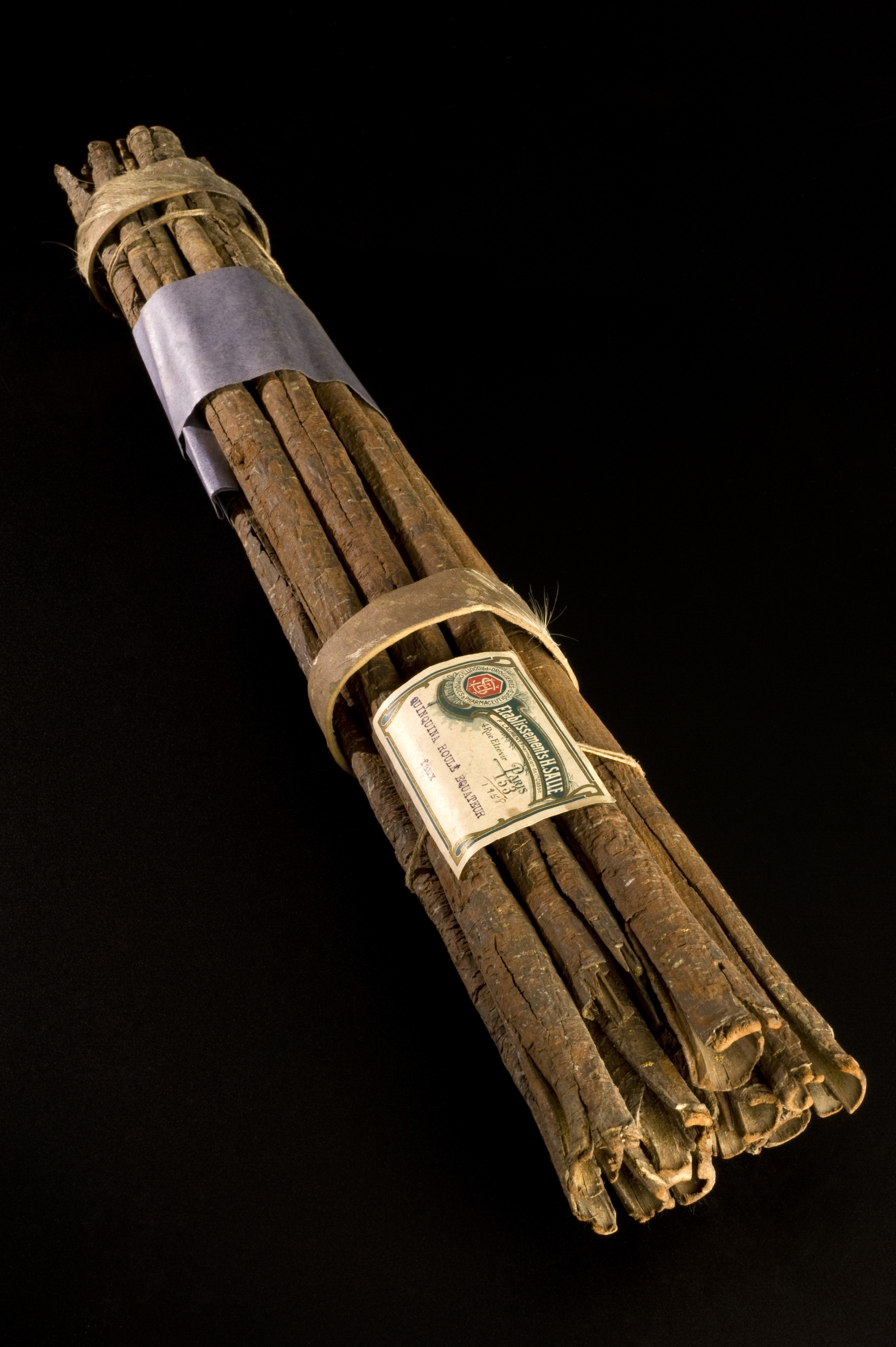
Sample of cinchona bark from the Quinquina Route Equateur, 1930

Bark of species from the genus Cinchona produces the alkaloid quinine, a potent anti-malarial treatment. Although originally native to South America, cinchona plantations were established in India, Ceylon, and the Dutch East Indies during the 19th century. By 1913, 95 percent of quinine production was controlled by the Dutch Kinabureau through large plantations on Java.

With the outbreak of World War II, a supply of quinine was essential for successful military operations. In 1942, the Japanese occupation of the Dutch East Indies cut off the supply of quinine to the allies.

Recognizing the need for a new source of quinine, a program was established by the United States Board of Economic Warfare under the operation of the Defense Supplies Corporation (DSC). Professor William C. Steere was brought on as assistant director. The objective was to find supplies of cinchona bark in the Andes for military use. It had three goals: to control all sites with commercial cinchona for long-term development; to develop plantations that could compete with established cinchona monopolies to ensure emergency provisions; and to train people in the producing countries to take over the industry at the end of US involvement. Six countries signed an agreement with the DSC; Colombia, Peru, Guatemala, Costa Rica, Ecuador and Bolivia. Wild populations of cinchona were also to be exploited. At its peak, as many as 30 American botanists were involved with the program.

== Exploratory missions ==
=== Colombia ===
The first party left for Colombia in October 1942. It consisted of two foresters, two botanists, a chemist, and a lawyer. This initial group included Steere, Francis Raymond Fosberg, and Leslie Holdridge. At first, two field parties were organized. Each team had a botanist to identify cinchona species, as well as a forester to calculate the volume of bark and logistics of harvest. They began their search in the high altitude rainforests of the Cordillera Oriental and the Rio Magdalena, making an inventory of all available species. Once cleared for harvest, bark from an area was gathered with native labor. It was transported on the backs of people or mules to rivers and airstrips. Eventually, it would arrive at one of the field laboratories located in Bogotá, Colombia, Quito, Ecuador, Lima, Peru, or La Paz, Bolivia. Dry bark was often shipped directly to America.

Over time, additional personnel were recruited to assist with the Colombian mission. This included Earl Lemley Core, William Brooks Drew, Joseph Andorfer Ewan, Norman Carter Fassett, and Harold St. John.

=== Ecuador ===
In 1943, an expedition to Ecuador was put together by the American Quinine Company, led by anthropologist Froelich Rainey. Surveying was difficult, however, since the cinchona forests of Ecuador were often remote and inaccessible. Surveying parties ranged between ten and fifteen men, many of whom served as porters and trail cutters. By mid-1943, Ecuador was the second largest producer of cinchona bark in Latin America.

Personnel involved with the Ecuadorian missions included Wendell Holmes Camp, William Brooks Drew, Francis Marion Ownbey, Frederick Wilson Popenoe, Gerald Webber Prescott, Misael Acosta Solís, William Campbell Steere, Julian Alfred Steyermark, and Ira Loren Wiggins.

== Plantation development ==
The American pharmaceutical company Merck and Co. planned to develop the cinchona industry in the Western hemisphere as early as 1932. Their research was backed by the US Department of State, US Department of Agriculture, the Ministry of Agriculture, Livestock, and Food of Guatemala, and the United Fruit Company. Small experimental plantations were established in Guatemala and Costa Rica during the 1930s.

After the outbreak of the war, the US government seized a plantation at El Porvenir, Guatemala and turned it into the world's largest cinchona nursery. Here, large scale research was conducted on propagation and harvesting techniques. Seedlings were distributed to other nearby countries, and further plantations were established in Mexico, Costa Rica, Ecuador, and Peru. Older plantations that existed before US involvement in Peru and Bolivia were also exploited.

== End of the program ==
In 1944, quinine was successfully synthesized by American chemists Robert Burns Woodward and William von Eggers Doering. This, along with the recovery of Asian plantations and a healthy stockpile of antimalarial products in US control, led to the termination of the program. Overall, the US had imported approximately 40 million pounds of dry bark over the course of two years. The program ceased operations on November 30, 1945.
