= Acostia =

Conservation status
- Endangered (IUCN 3.1)

Scientific classification
- Kingdom: Plantae
- Clade: Embryophytes
- Clade: Tracheophytes
- Clade: Spermatophytes
- Clade: Angiosperms
- Clade: Monocots
- Clade: Commelinids
- Order: Poales
- Family: Poaceae
- Subfamily: Panicoideae
- Supertribe: Andropogonodae
- Tribe: Paspaleae
- Subtribe: Paspalinae
- Genus: Acostia; Swallen
- Species: A. gracilis

Binomial name
- Acostia gracilis Swallen

Synonyms
- Panicum acostia R.D.Webster

Genus of grasses

Acostia is a genus of South American plants in the grass family.

The only known species is Acostia gracilis, found only in Ecuador. It is listed as an endangered species.

The genus name of Acostia is in honour of Misael Acosta Solís (1910–1994), an Ecuadorian naturalist. The Latin specific epithet of gracilis means "slender". Both the genus and the species were first described and published in Bol. Soc. Argent. Bot. Vol.12 on page 109 in 1968. The genus was described of a single specimen, and between its first description in 1968 and 1989 no further collections have been made. In 1989, Webster, Kirkbride and Reyna treated it as a member of the genus Panicum under the new combination Panicum acostia, since Panicum gracile is unavailable, and in 2022 it has been suggested by Gallaher and co-authors that it should be considered either to form a separate genus or as a member of the genus Axonopus.

== See also ==
- List of Poaceae genera
