= Charles Louis Gilly =

American botanist (1911–1970)

- Born: 1911; Fairfield, Iowa
- Died: 1970 (aged 58–59); Traverse City, Michigan
- Education: Parsons College; Columbia University; Iowa State University; Michigan State College
- Scientific career
- Fields: Botany
- Author abbrev. (botany): Gilly

Charles Louis Gilly (1911–1970) was an American botanist who was an expert in the flora of Central and South America. He, alongside Wendell Holmes Camp, coined the term biosystematics.

Gilly was born in Fairfield, Iowa. While employed at Iowa State University, he collected botanical specimens in Cuba, Mexico, Guatemala, and Nicaragua. He also studied the taxonomy of teosinte. His collections in Mexico were considerable, and he often collected with Efraím Hernández Xolocotzi. After achieving his doctorate, he worked as professor and herbarium curator at Michigan State College until 1954. In 1970, he died in Traverse City, Michigan.
