= Wendell Holmes Camp =

American botanist (1904–1963)

- Born: Feb. 22, 1904; Dayton, Ohio
- Died: February 4, 1963 (aged 58)
- Education: Otterbein College; Ohio State University
- Scientific career
- Fields: Botany
- Workplaces: New York Botanical Garden; University of Connecticut
- Author abbrev. (botany): Camp

Wendell Holmes "Red" Camp (February 22, 1904 – February 4, 1963) was an American botanist, explorer, taxonomist, educator, and expert of the genus Vaccinium.

== Career ==
Camp earned his B.Sc. in geology from Otterbein College in 1925. He attended a graduate program at Ohio State University before switching his focus to botany. He completed his Ph.D. from the university in 1932. In 1936, he was hired by the New York Botanical Garden (NYBG) as Assistant Curator. His first assignment was a collection trip to Oaxaca with Thomas Baillie MacDougall.

Camp's research specialty involved the relationships and evolution of the Ericaceae, and he frequently collaborated with Charles Louis Gilly. He took leave from the NYBG to assist with the Société Haitiano-Américaine de Développement Agricole in Haiti in 1943. After leaving the Société, he spent the rest of the year traveling through South America in order to purchase loofahs for use as oil filters by the U.S. Navy. He joined the Mision de Cinchona in Ecuador from 1944 to 1945, working closely with William Campbell Steere. After the termination of the program, he was promoted to Associate Curator at the NYBG. Receiving new funding from the Garden, he remained in Ecuador with his assistants to collect plants. He collected 5,828 unique specimens, 3% of which were determined to be new taxa.

Camp left the NYBG in 1949 for a position as Curator of Experimental Botany and Horticulture at Academy of Natural Sciences of Philadelphia. One of his duties was helping design the Taylor Memorial Arboretum for public visitation. In 1949, he also served as president of the American Society of Plant Taxonomists. In 1953, he was hired as chair of the Department of Botany at the University of Connecticut. He remained there until his death from a brain tumor in 1963.

== Legacy ==
The species Cavendishia campii, Fuchsia campii, and Themistoclesia campii are named after him. The standard author abbreviation Camp is used to indicate this person as the author when citing a botanical name.
