= Misael Acosta Solís =

Ecuadorian naturalist

- Born: December 16, 1910; Ambato, Ecuador
- Died: April 1994 (aged 83); Quito
- Education: Central University of Ecuador
- Scientific career
- Fields: Botany
- Workplaces: Pontifical Catholic University of Ecuador

Misael Acosta Solís (Ambato, December 16, 1910 – Quito, April, 1994) was an Ecuadorian naturalist.

He earned a doctorate degree from the School of Natural Science of the Central University of Ecuador. In 1939, he became a corresponding member of the National Geographic Society of Washington DC. He was the Botanical Director of the Cinchona Mission in Ecuador of the U.S. Department of Agriculture. He founded the Forestry Department of Ecuador. He was a professor of Botany and Ecology at the Pontifical Catholic University of Ecuador. He wrote the 5-volume resource encyclopedia Los recursos naturales del Ecuador y su conservación (English: The Natural Resources of Ecuador and its Conservation), which was awarded the Wallace Atwood Prize from the Pan American Institute of Geography and History, and for which Acosta Solís was awarded the Humboldt Medal from the Culture Department of West Germany.

In 1968, botanist Jason Richard Swallen published Acostia which is a genus of South American plants in the grass family, which was named in Misael Acosta Solís's honor.

In 1982, Acosta Solís was the recipient of the National Merit Award. In 1989, he was the recipient of Ecuador's highest national prize Premio Eugenio Espejo for his work in the scientific field; it is awarded by the President of Ecuador.
