= Leslie Holdridge =

American botanist and climatologist

- Born: Leslie Rensselaer Holdridge; September 29, 1907; Ledyard, Connecticut
- Died: June 19, 1999 (aged 91); Easton, Maryland
- Citizenship: USA
- Education: H. B.S. in Forestry, University of Maine, 1931, postgrad., 1931-32; M.S. in Ecology, University of Michigan, 1946, Ph.D., 1947.
- Scientific career
- Workplaces: Costa Rica Institute of Technology

Leslie Ransselaer Holdridge (September 29, 1907 – June 19, 1999) was an American botanist and climatologist known for developing a system of classifying land areas ("life zones") according to their climate and other variables.

== Career ==
Holdridge studied and worked at the University of Maine including as a Graduate Fellow in Botany. Holdridge participated in the Cinchona Missions, a United States effort to search for natural sources of quinine during World War II.

Diagram of life zone classifications.

In his famous 1947 paper, he defined "life zones" using three indicators:

1. Mean annual biotemperature (average temperature, after data values below 0 °C or above 30 °C have been eliminated)
2. Total annual precipitation
3. The ratio of mean annual potential evapotranspiration to mean total annual precipitation.

In 1954, Holdridge established the La Selva Biological Station for botanical experiments for the purpose of natural resource management.

== Personal life ==
He was the father of composer Lee Holdridge as well as the father of Leslie A. Holdridge, Lorena Holdridge, Marbella Holdridge, Marly Holdridge, Marisela Holdridge, Thania Holdridge, John Holdridge, Ida Holdridge, Reuseland Holdridge, Leythy J. Holdridge and youngest son Gregory Holdridge whom he fathered with Costa Rican Clara Luz Melendez. He is also grandfather to the now known Christian digital creator and influencer Leslie L. Holdridge in the United States.

== See also ==
- Climate classification
