= 2010 South Korean snowstorm =

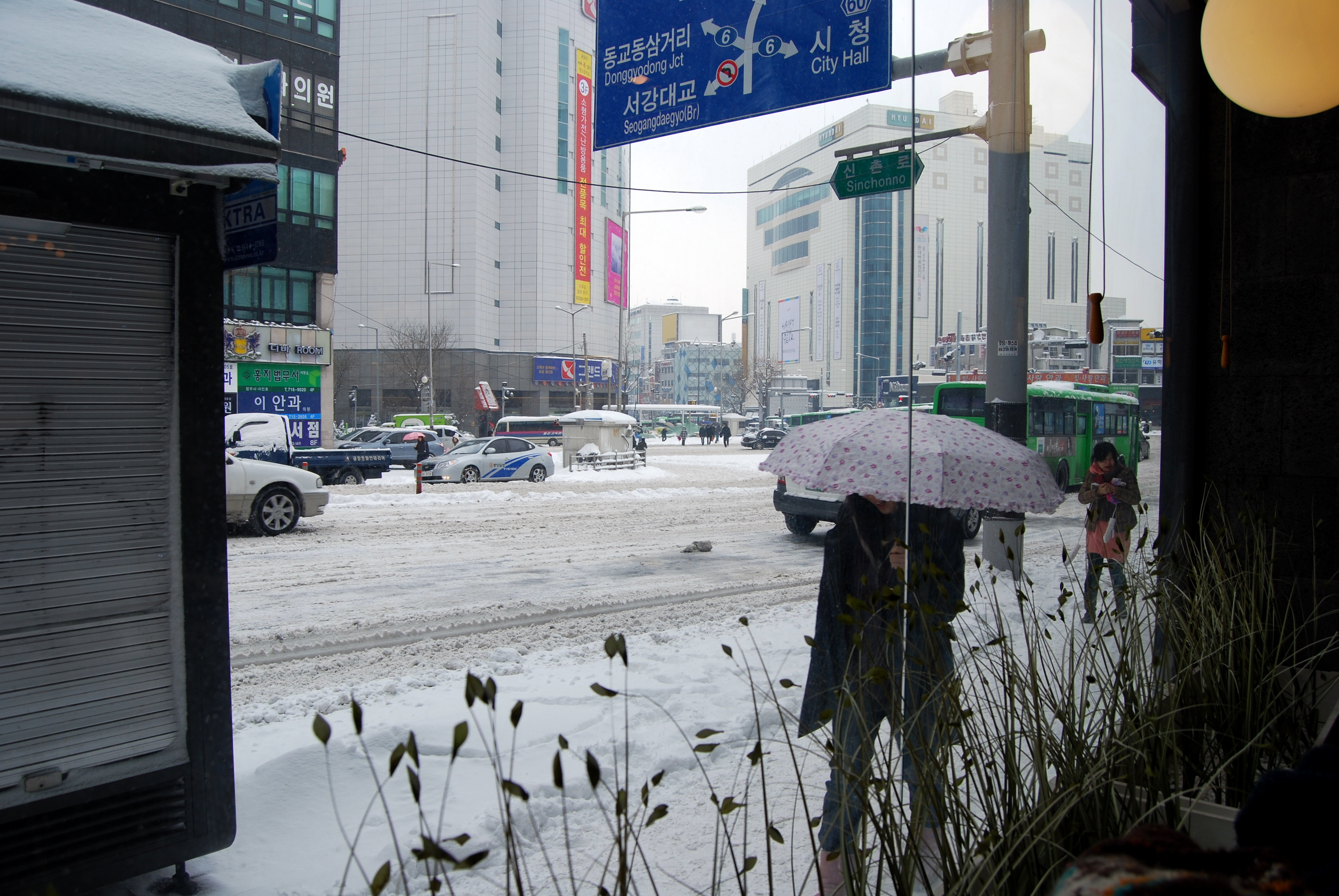
- Snow-covered Sinchon Rotary viewed from Seogangno, 4 January 2010

Meteorological history
- Date: 4 January 2010

Overall effects
- Fatalities: 1
- Injuries: 2
- Damage: ₩10.6 billion
- Areas affected: Seoul, Gyeonggi Province, Gangwon Province

The 2010 South Korean snowstorm was a blizzard that struck central South Korea on 4 January 2010, centered on Seoul and affecting the wider Capital Area and Gangwon Province. At 2:00 p.m. on 4 January, Seoul recorded 25.8 cm of accumulated snow, setting a new record for the highest single-day new snowfall (Note: New snowfall (신적설) refers to the amount of snow accumulated from 00:01 on the observation day to the time of observation. For example, if the observation day is 4 January 2010 and the observation time is 14:00, new snowfall is measured as the amount of snow that accumulated between 00:00 and 14:00 on 4 January. If snow melts or is blown away by wind in the hour following the observation, the recorded new snowfall value decreases accordingly. This differs from total snowfall (적설량), which measures accumulated snow regardless of time period.) since observations began in 1937. The storm caused widespread damage and disruption across the Capital Area and Gangwon Province.

== Forecast ==
On 3 January 2010, the day before the snowstorm, the Korea Meteorological Administration (KMA) issued a press release at 4:30 p.m. forecasting snowfall across the country, centered on the central region, due to a low-pressure system that had developed while moving southeastward from northern China toward the Korean Peninsula. The KMA predicted particularly heavy snowfall centered on southern Gyeonggi Province, northern Chungcheong Province, and northern Gangwon Province. However, 20 cm or more of snow fell on Seoul, northern Gyeonggi Province, and northern Gangwon Province — areas for which not even a preliminary heavy-snow advisory had been issued — far exceeding the KMA's initial forecast of around 5 cm for Seoul, drawing widespread criticism of the agency's forecasting accuracy.

== Causes ==
From around 26 December 2009, a climatic pattern began to emerge in which a mass of cold air at around −40 °C, formed over Siberia at approximately 5 km above ground level over the Manchuria region, began cycling periodically. As a result, on most days other than 29 and 30 December, the −30 °C isotherm extended across the upper atmosphere at around 5 km above northern parts of the Korean Peninsula, causing sharp cold across most of the peninsula — with morning low temperatures falling below zero everywhere except Jeju Island and the south coast, and many days in the central region seeing daytime temperatures remain below 0 °C.

On 4 January, an upper-level trough carrying extremely cold air of around −40 °C passed through the upper atmosphere at approximately 5 km above northern Korea, leaving cold air of around −30 °C lingering over the central region. Simultaneously, a low-pressure system approaching from the interior of central China absorbed a large amount of moisture as it passed over the Yellow Sea, then collided with the cold air mass over the central Korean interior, generating intense snow clouds. The rear of this low-pressure system saw an expansion of the Siberian High, driving a strong inflow of cold air, which caused heavy snowfall particularly over the Seoul Capital Area and Gangwon Province, which lay to the north of the low-pressure center.

== Records ==
The snow that fell on 4 January was concentrated mainly in the Seoul Capital Area and Gangwon Province, where an average of around 20 cm of record snowfall was observed. In Seoul, a maximum of 25.8 cm accumulated in a single day. The maximum new snowfall recorded in Seoul that day (Note: Peak new snowfall (최심 신적설) refers to the highest amount of new snowfall recorded at any point during the day.) surpassed the previous first-place record of 25.6 cm set on 28 January 1969, setting a new all-time record for new snowfall since observations began. Incheon recorded a peak new snowfall of 22.3 cm and Suwon 19.5 cm, ranking second and third respectively in the all-time peak new snowfall rankings. In contrast, South Chungcheong Province, adjacent to Gyeonggi Province, received relatively little snow, resulting in large regional variation in snowfall totals. In sharp contrast to the heavy snowfall in the central region, South Jeolla Province and the southern and eastern coastal areas of South Gyeongsang Province — excluding mountainous areas — saw rain or sleet due to higher temperatures.

=== Snowfall by region ===
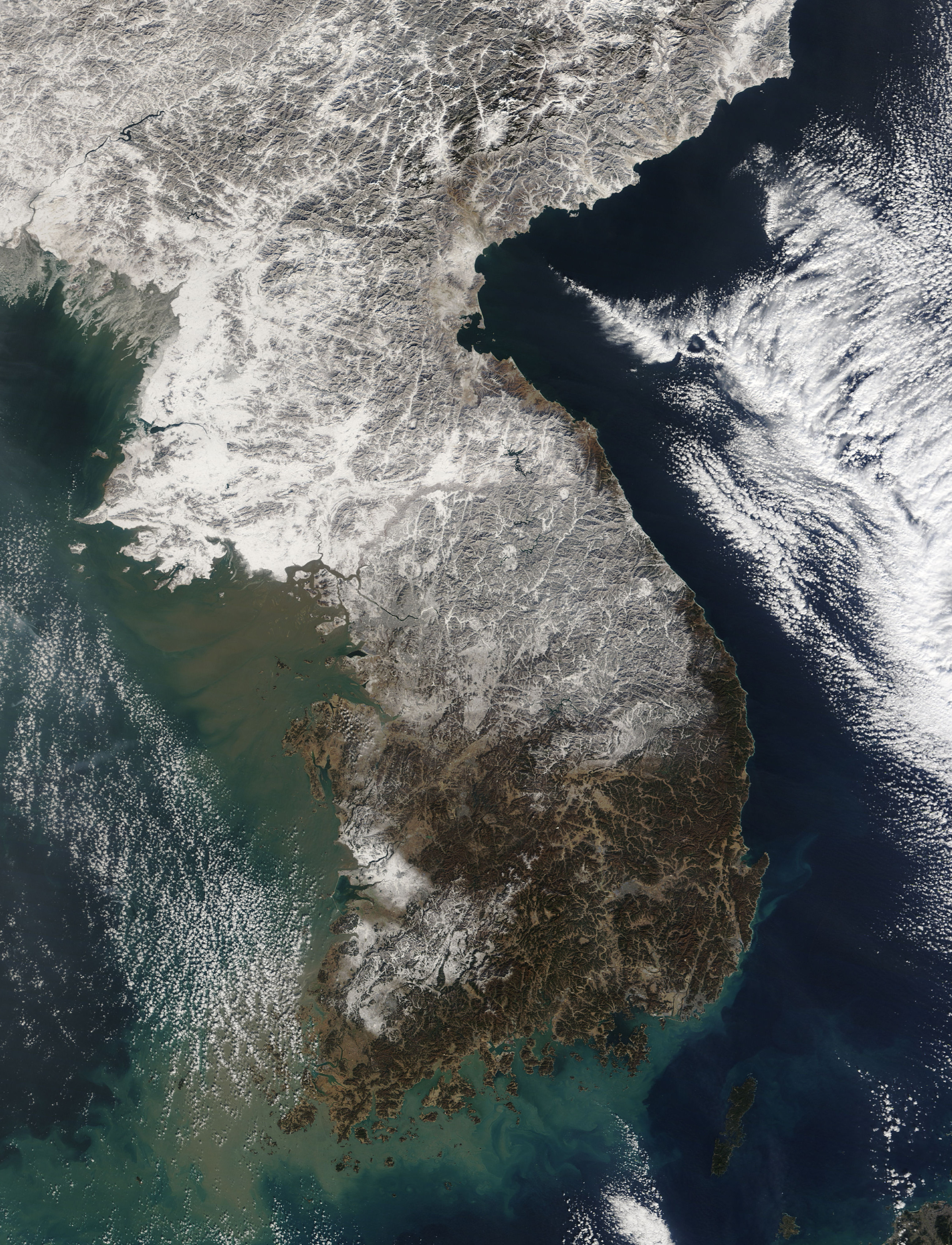
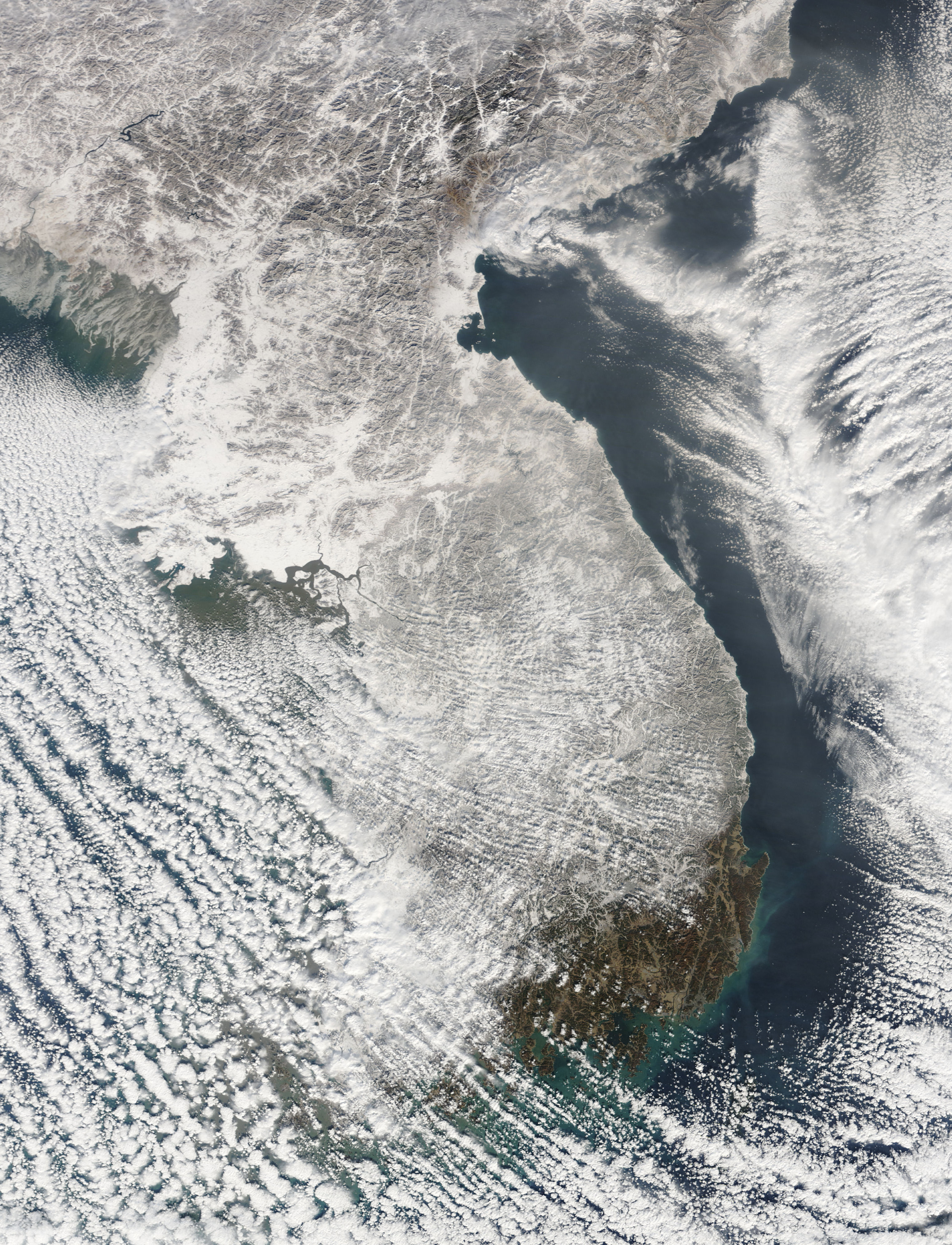
Satellite images of the Korean Peninsula before (left) and after (right) the snowstorm

Peak new snowfall by region (top 5 stations per region, 00:00–21:00 on 4 January)

Seoul · Incheon · Gyeonggi Province

- Seoul: 25.8 cm
- Icheon: 23.0 cm
- Incheon: 22.6 cm
- Munsan: 20.2 cm
- Suwon: 19.5 cm

Gangwon Province

- Daegwallyeong: 31.5 cm
- Bukgangneung: 24.5 cm
- Chuncheon: 23.0 cm
- Donghae: 21.6 cm
- Yeongwol: 21.4 cm

Daejeon · North and South Chungcheong Provinces

- Chungju: 15.5 cm
- Cheonan: 12.8 cm
- Cheongju: 7.5 cm
- Chupungnyeong: 6.3 cm
- Daejeon: 5.3 cm

Daegu · North and South Gyeongsang Provinces

- Uljin: 10.5 cm
- Andong: 7.2 cm
- Sangju: 6.5 cm
- Gumi: 6.0 cm
- Geochang: 5.0 cm

== Impact ==
=== South Korea ===
Media described the snowfall of 4 January as "the heaviest snow in 100 years," reflecting the severity of damage concentrated in the Capital Area and Gangwon Province. The overlap between snowfall and morning rush hour caused extreme congestion on major roads in the Capital Area — traffic was described as a "transportation catastrophe" — and because temperatures remained below zero throughout the day and snow did not melt, evening rush hour also saw severe gridlock. Traffic accidents increased sharply, and emergency call centers at insurance companies were overwhelmed by drivers requesting roadside assistance. The paralysis of road transport also disrupted logistics companies, causing delivery delays across the country. Accumulated snow caused structural damage to agricultural facilities, including greenhouses, livestock sheds, and ginseng cultivation structures.

==== Statistics ====
- Property damage
  - Approximately ₩10.6 billion (2010 KRW)
    - Greenhouses: approximately 610 structures
    - Livestock sheds: 57 structures
    - Ginseng cultivation facilities: 17.5 ha

==== Seoul ====
Snow covered the runways at Gimpo International Airport, bringing all flight operations to a complete halt for the first time in nine years; as a knock-on effect, domestic flights were cancelled in large numbers at other airports including Gimhae International Airport. The morning commute across the Capital Area was heavily disrupted. Major roads in Seoul became severely congested, resembling parking lots, and traffic was restricted on several city roads including Inwangsan-ro and Bugaksan-ro. The Seoul Metropolitan Government deployed more than 3,000 personnel and approximately 2,300 tonnes of calcium chloride for emergency snow removal, but with heavy snowfall continuing and temperatures remaining below zero, the effort had limited effect. As road conditions deteriorated, commuters shifted to public transport, but the subway system was not immune to the storm's effects: snow accumulation on rails caused temporary service suspensions on parts of Seoul Subway Line 1 and Seoul Subway Line 2. Snow also caused signal switch failures at Seoul Station, Yeongdeungpo Station, and Cheongnyangni Station, leading to delays on KTX and conventional train services.

==== Incheon and Gyeonggi Province ====
Numerous flights were cancelled at Incheon International Airport due to the snowstorm, though snow removal operations prevented a complete halt to flight operations. Unloading operations at Port of Incheon and Port of Pyeongtaek were fully suspended or delayed due to heavy snow and strong winds. As in Seoul, snowfall coincided with the morning rush hour in Incheon and Gyeonggi Province, causing transportation chaos. The Incheon city government issued an all-hands mobilization order, deploying approximately 5,000 civil servants and 315 pieces of equipment to spread more than 2,500 tonnes of snow-removal agents including calcium chloride, liquid de-icer, salt, and sand, but the sheer volume of accumulated snow limited the effectiveness of these measures. The Gyeonggi Province Disaster Response Headquarters deployed approximately 27,000 personnel including civil servants and military personnel, along with more than 1,800 pieces of equipment, to spread approximately 8,000 tonnes of calcium chloride, salt, and sand on roads, but again had limited success against the accumulated snow. In Ansan, a storage facility at the Korea Rural Community Corporation's rural research institute collapsed, initially reported as injuring three people; it was later confirmed that the structure was an air-dome experimental facility being inspected during snow removal, and that the incident caused one fatality and two injuries.

==== Gangwon Province ====
Gangwon Province also received around 20 cm of snow, bringing morning commute traffic to a crawl. The mountainous terrain resulted in partial road closures at passes including Jingogae, and the suspension of bus services on mountain routes left many village residents effectively isolated. Greenhouses, ginseng cultivation facilities, and livestock sheds collapsed, with provisional damage estimates of approximately ₩120 million. However, because the snow fell in a dry form with low moisture content, and because the Yeongdong region of Gangwon Province is one of South Korea's heavy-snowfall areas and was comparatively well-prepared, actual damage was less severe than anticipated. Gangneung's efficient snow-removal operations attracted nationwide attention as a model response.

==== Daejeon and Chungcheong Provinces ====
Snowfall was comparatively light in this region compared to the Capital Area and Gangwon Province, limiting overall damage, though losses were reported in North Chungcheong Province, which received more snow than South Chungcheong Province. In Chungju, a poultry farm collapsed under the weight of accumulated snow, killing approximately 3,000 chickens, and greenhouse damage was also reported. Some flights at Cheongju Airport were cancelled, and ferry services to island communities from ports along the South Chungcheong coast were suspended due to rough seas.

==== North Gyeongsang Province ====
Snow fell in North Gyeongsang Province, Daegu, and parts of inland South Gyeongsang Province, while Busan, Ulsan, and most of South Gyeongsang Province received rain or sleet, limiting snowstorm damage to North Gyeongsang Province and Daegu. Postal deliveries in rural northern North Gyeongsang Province were temporarily suspended, one ginseng cultivation facility collapsed, and several mountain passes in the North Gyeongsang area were temporarily closed before reopening.

=== North Korea ===
North Korea also experienced heavy snowfall around 4 January. However, Korean Central Broadcasting reported only that light snow had fallen in Haeju, South Hwanghae Province on the 3rd, and in Sinuiju, North Pyongan Province, Pyongyang, and Sariwon, North Hwanghae Province on the 4th, without reporting on snowfall totals or damage. One North Korean defector noted that transportation infrastructure in North Korea was less developed, so traffic disruption of the kind seen in South Korea was less unusual, and that the relative scarcity of agricultural facilities such as greenhouses meant snowstorm damage was limited. The International Federation of Red Cross and Red Crescent Societies stated there were no signs of snow-related disaster in North Korea.

== Controversies ==
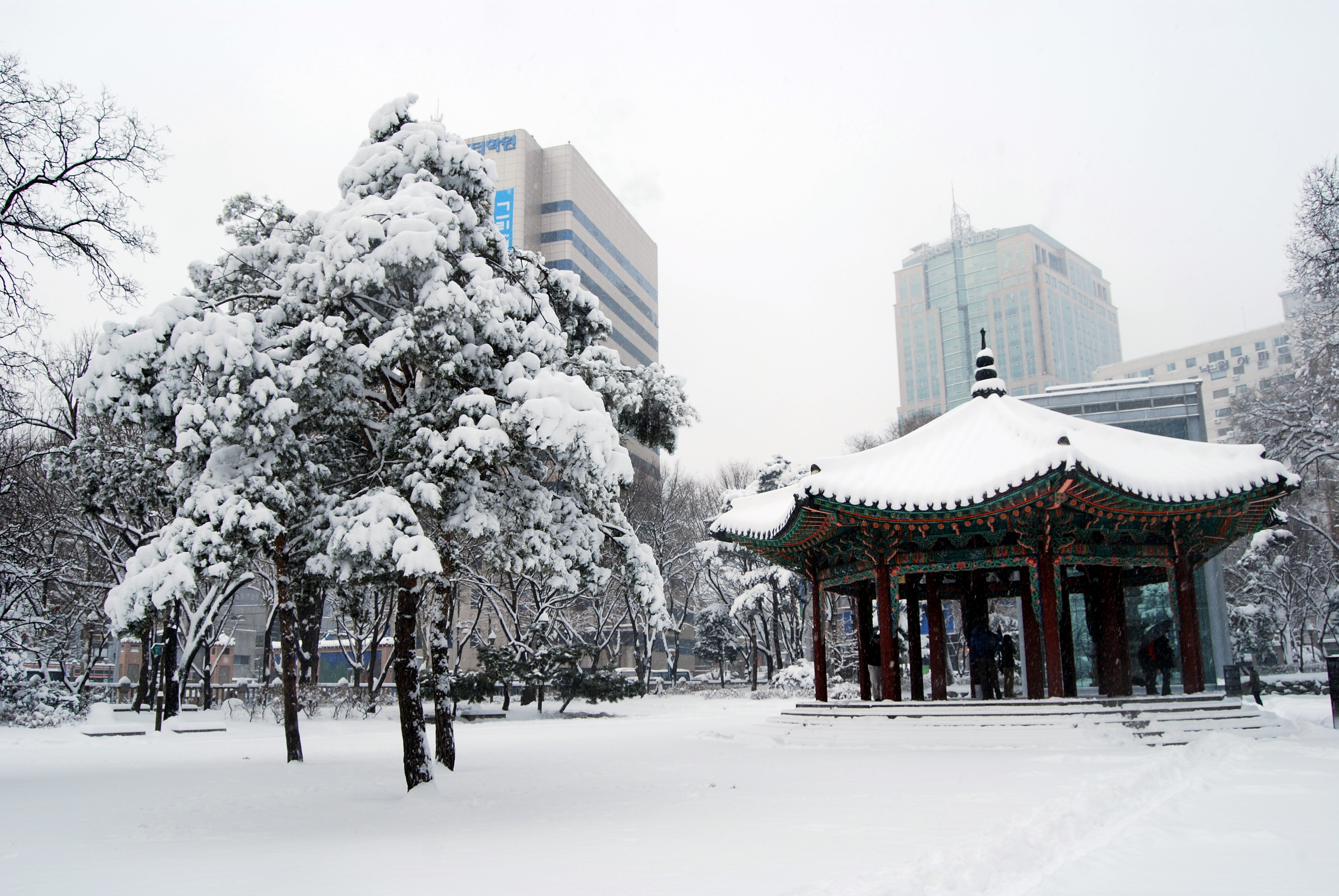
Tapgol Park, blanketed in snow from the storm

The heavy snowfall highlighted concerns that snow-removal agents such as calcium chloride were ineffective during such extreme events while causing new environmental problems, damaging road surfaces and street trees. Environmental groups also raised concerns that snow piled up in open lots by local authorities after snow removal contained de-icing agents such as calcium chloride, which could cause water pollution if it melted into rivers and streams.

The National Emergency Management Agency noted that local government ordinances requiring residents and business owners to clear snow in front of their own properties were not being complied with, and announced that fines of up to ₩1 million would be imposed on those who failed to do so, sparking debate.

About ten days after the snowstorm, on 13 January, the KMA announced that the economic value of the 4 January snowfall had been estimated at more than ₩830 billion, drawing criticism that it was inappropriate to discuss only the economic benefits when the storm had caused considerable damage.

Online, a segment in which KBS journalist Park Dae-gi reported from the snowstorm while being pelted with snow went viral, as did footage of a citizen skiing on a snow-covered road in Cheongdam-dong, who became known online as the "Cheongdam-dong ski hero."

== See also ==
- 2009–10 East Asian cold wave
- 2004 South Korean snowstorm
- 2024 South Korean snowstorm
