= List of cities with a continental climate =

This is a list of cities that are classified as having a continental climate under the Köppen climate classification. The list is sorted by location. For a list of cities that is sorted by climate classification, see List of cities by Köppen climate classification.

== Africa ==
=== Algeria ===
- Setif^{1} (Dsa)

=== Morocco ===
- Imilchil^{1} (bordering Cfb)

== Asia ==
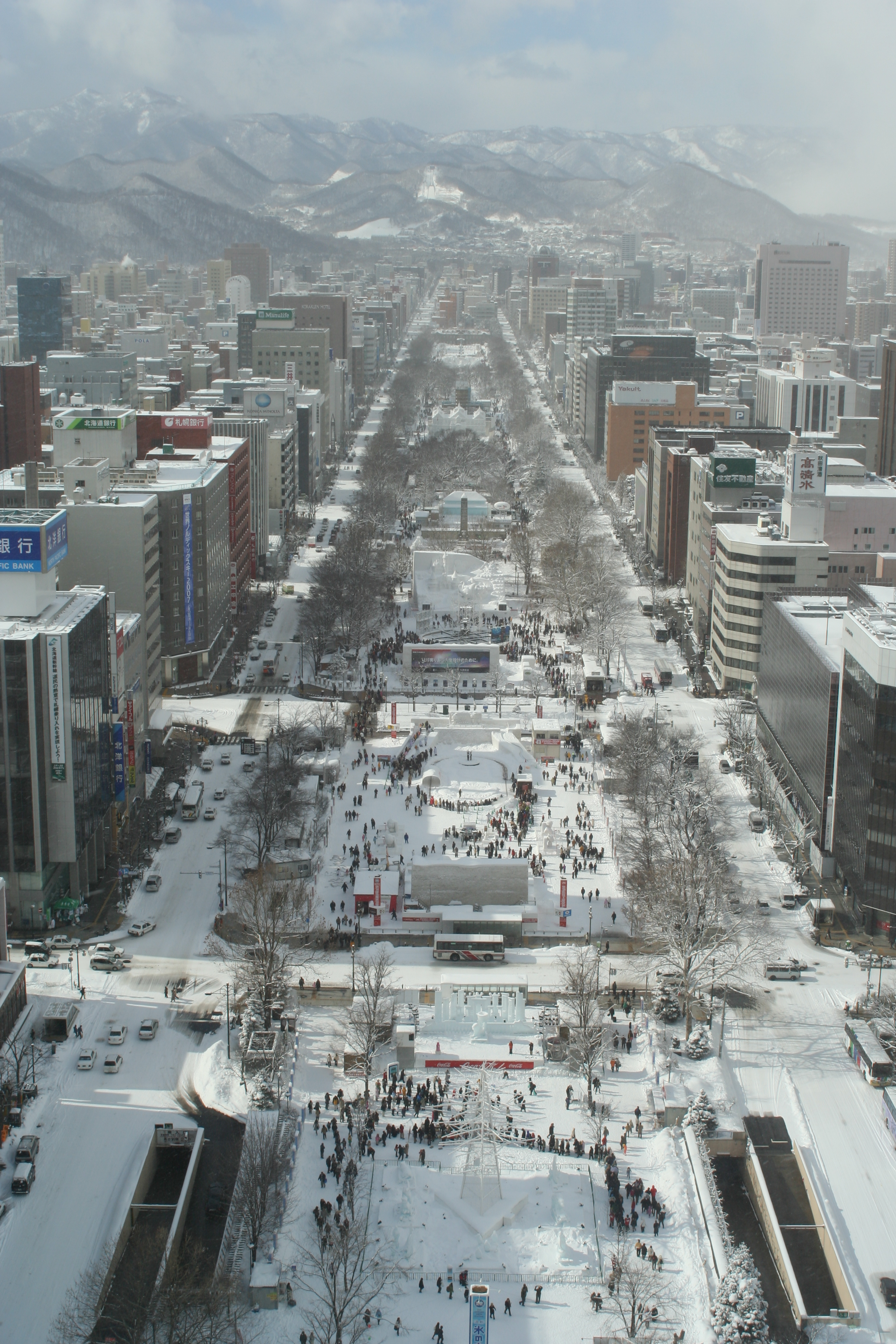
The snowy city of Sapporo, Japan

=== Afghanistan ===
- Chaghcharan (Dsb)
- Fayzabad^{1} (Dsa bordering Csa)
- Ghazni (Dsa bordering BSk)
- Maidan Shar (Dsb)
- Puli Alam (Dsa)

=== Armenia ===
- Gyumri
- Jermuk (Dsb bordering Dfb)
- Kapan
- Sisian
- Vanadzor
- Yerevan (bordering BSk)

=== Azerbaijan ===
- Qabala^{1} (bordering Cfa)
- Shamakhi^{1} (Dsa bordering Csa)

=== China ===
- Anshan
- Baicheng
- Baishan
- Beijing^{1}
- Biru County
- Chamdo^{1}
- Changchun
- Changzhi (bordering BSk)
- Chengde
- Dalian
- Dandong
- Daqing
- Fushun
- Hailin
- Harbin
- Huludao
- Hulunbuir
- Hegang
- Heihe
- Jiamusi
- Jilin
- Jinan^{1} (bordering Cwa)
- Jincheng
- Jinzhou
- Jixi
- Liaoyuan
- Linyi^{1} (bordering Cwa)
- Lüliang (bordering BSk)
- Mudanjiang
- Puyang^{1} (bordering BSk)
- Qingyang
- Qinhuangdao
- Qiqihar
- Shenyang
- Shigatse^{1}
- Shuangyashan
- Siping
- Songyuan
- Suihua
- Tangshan
- Tieling
- Tonghua
- Ulanhot
- Ürümqi (bordering BSk)
- Weifang^{1}
- Weinan^{1} (bordering BSk/Cwa)
- Xi'an^{1} (bordering Cwa)
- Xining (bordering BSk)
- Yangquan (bordering BSk)
- Yanji
- Yantai^{1}
- Yichun
- Yingkou
- Zibo^{1}

=== Georgia ===
- Akhaltsikhe^{1}

==== South Ossetia ====
- Tskhinvali^{1} (disputed with Georgia)

=== India ===
- Badrinath^{1} (bordering Cfb)
- Dras (Dsb bordering Dfb)

=== Iran ===
- Abali (Dsb)
- Arak^{1} (Dsa bordering BSk)
- Ardabil^{1} (bordering BSk)
- Hamadan^{1} (Dsa bordering BSk)
- Saqqez^{1} (Dsa)
- Sardasht^{1} (Dsa)
- Tabriz^{1} (Dsa bordering BSk)
- Urmia^{1} (bordering BSk)

=== Japan ===
- Aizuwakamatsu^{1} (bordering Cfa)
- Aomori^{1}
- Asahikawa
- Daisen^{1}
- Ebetsu
- Hachinohe^{1}
- Hakodate^{1}
- Hirosaki^{1}
- Ichinoseki^{1} (bordering Cfa)
- Kitami
- Kushiro
- Matsumae^{1} (bordering Cfa)
- Matsumoto^{1} (bordering Cfa)
- Morioka^{1}
- Mount Aso^{1}
- Muroran^{1}
- Mutsu^{1}
- Nagano^{1} (bordering Cfa)
- Nichinan^{1} (bordering Cfa)
- Obihiro
- Ōshū^{1}
- Otaru
- Sapporo
- Tendō^{1}
- Tomakomai
- Tome^{1} (bordering Cfa)
- Yamagata^{1} (bordering Cfa)
- Yokote^{1}

=== Kazakhstan ===
- Aktöbe
- Almaty
- Arys^{1} (Dsa bordering BSk)
- Astana
- Karaganda
- Kostanay
- Oskemen
- Pavlodar
- Petropavl
- Semey
- Shymkent^{1} (Dsa bordering Csa)
- Taraz (Dsa bordering BSk)

=== Kyrgyzstan ===
- Bishkek^{1} (Dsa)
- Jalal-Abad^{1} (Dsa)
- Kara-Balta (Dsa)
- Karakol
- Osh^{1} (Dsa)

=== Mongolia ===
- Baruunturuun (bordering Dwc)
- Darkhan
- Kharkhorin
- Sükhbaatar

=== North Korea ===
- Chongjin
- Haeju^{1}
- Hamhung
- Hoeryong
- Kaesong
- Kimchaek
- Nampo
- Pyongyang
- Rason
- Sariwon
- Sinuiju
- Tanchon
- Wonsan^{1}

=== Russia ===
- Abakan (bordering BSk)
- Barnaul
- Birobidzhan
- Blagoveshchensk
- Chelyabinsk
- Chita (bordering Dwc)
- Gorno-Altaysk
- Irkutsk
- Kemerovo
- Khabarovsk
- Krasnoyarsk
- Komsomolsk-on-Amur
- Kurilsk (bordering Dfc)
- Kurgan
- Lesozavodsk
- Nakhodka
- Novosibirsk
- Omsk
- Tomsk
- Tyumen
- Vladivostok
- Yekaterinburg
- Yuzhno-Kurilsk
- Yuzhno-Sakhalinsk

=== South Korea ===
- Andong^{1}
- Ansan
- Anyang^{1}
- Bucheon^{1}
- Cheonan^{1}
- Cheongju^{1}
- Chuncheon
- Chupungnyeong^{1}
- Daejeon^{1}
- Goyang
- Gunwi
- Hwaseong^{1}
- Incheon^{1}
- Mungyeong^{1}
- Namyangju
- Pyeongchang
- Sangju
- Sejong^{1}
- Seongnam^{1}
- Seoul^{1}
- Socheongdo^{1} (bordering Cwa)
- Suwon^{1}
- Uiseong
- Wonju
- Yeongcheon^{1} (bordering Cwa)
- Yeongju
- Yongin

=== Tajikistan ===
- Isfara^{1} (Dsa)
- Istaravshan^{1} (Dsa)
- Konibodom^{1} (Dsa)
- Panjakent^{1} (Dsa)
- Roghun (Dsb)

=== Turkey ===
- Ağrı (Dsb)
- Ardahan
- Bingöl^{1} (Dsa)
- Bitlis (Dsa)
- Çankırı^{1} (bordering BSk/Cfa)
- Çorum^{1} (bordering Cfa/Cfb)
- Erzincan^{1} (Dsa)
- Erzurum
- Hakkâri (Dsa)
- Kars
- Kastamonu^{1}
- Kayseri^{1} (Dsa)
- Muş (Dsa)
- Sivas (Dsb)
- Tunceli^{1} (Dsa)
- Van^{1} (Dsa)
- Yozgat^{1} (Dsb)

=== Uzbekistan ===
- Chirchiq^{1} (Dsa bordering Csa)

== Europe ==
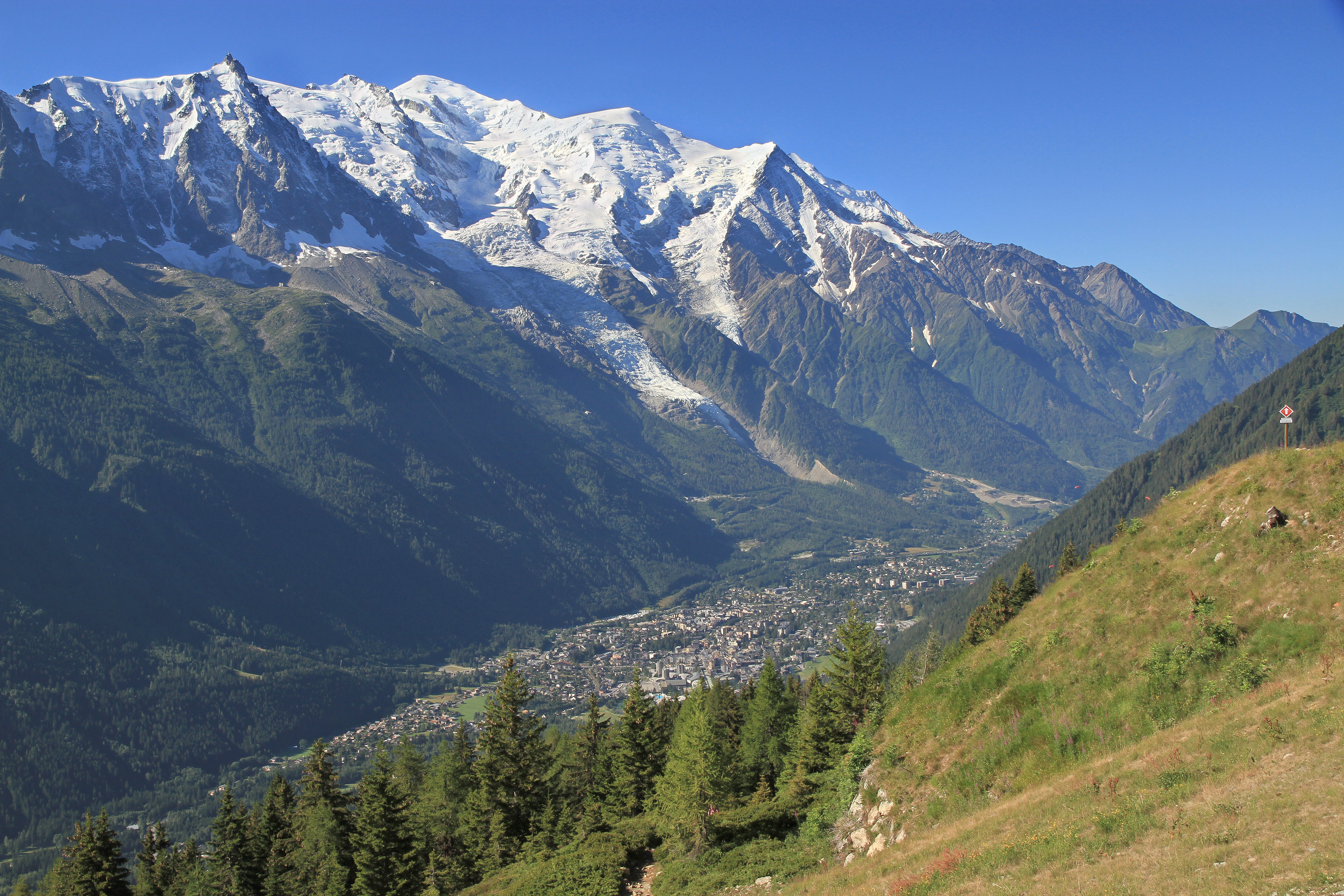
Chamonix valley, France

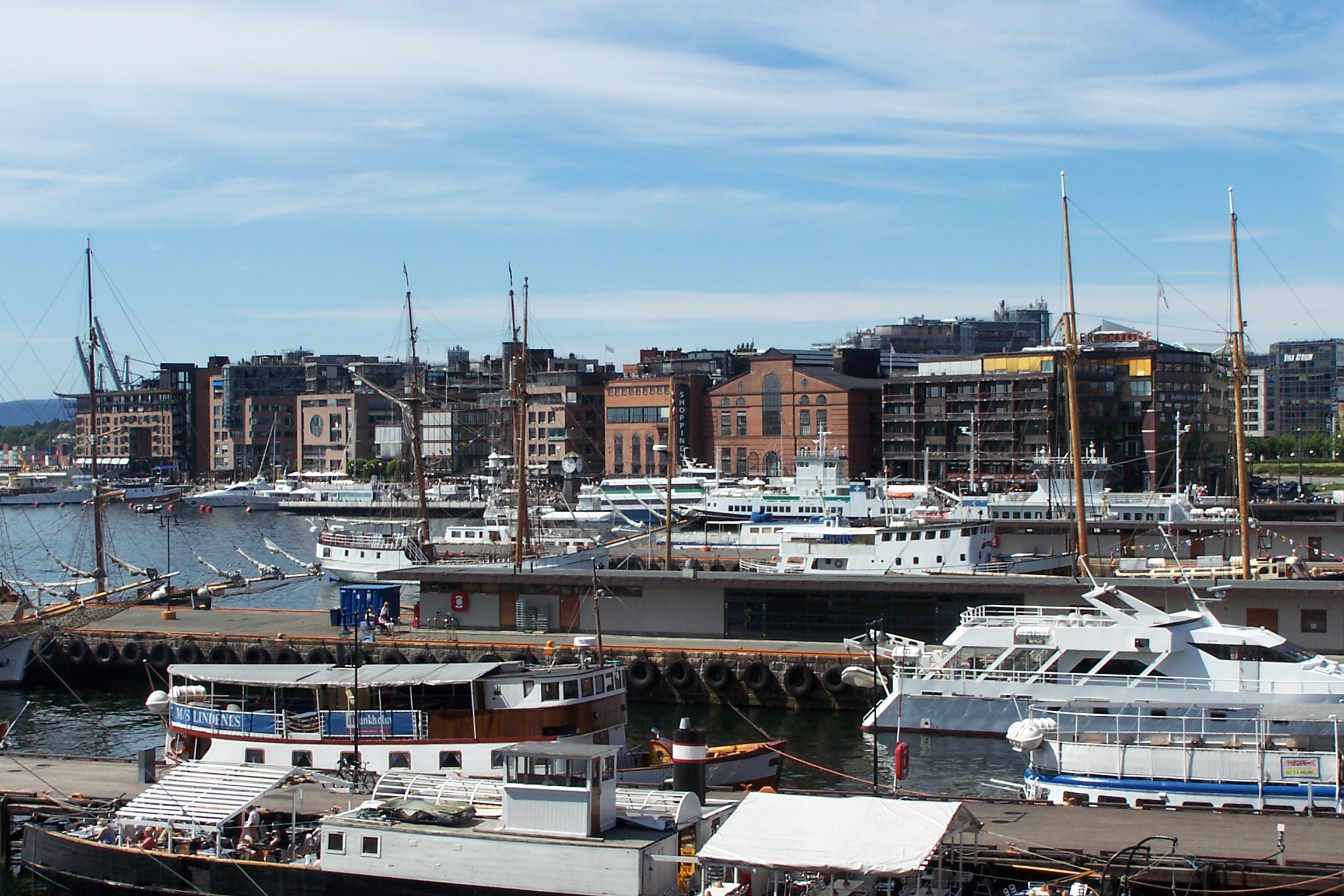
Aker Brygge in Oslo

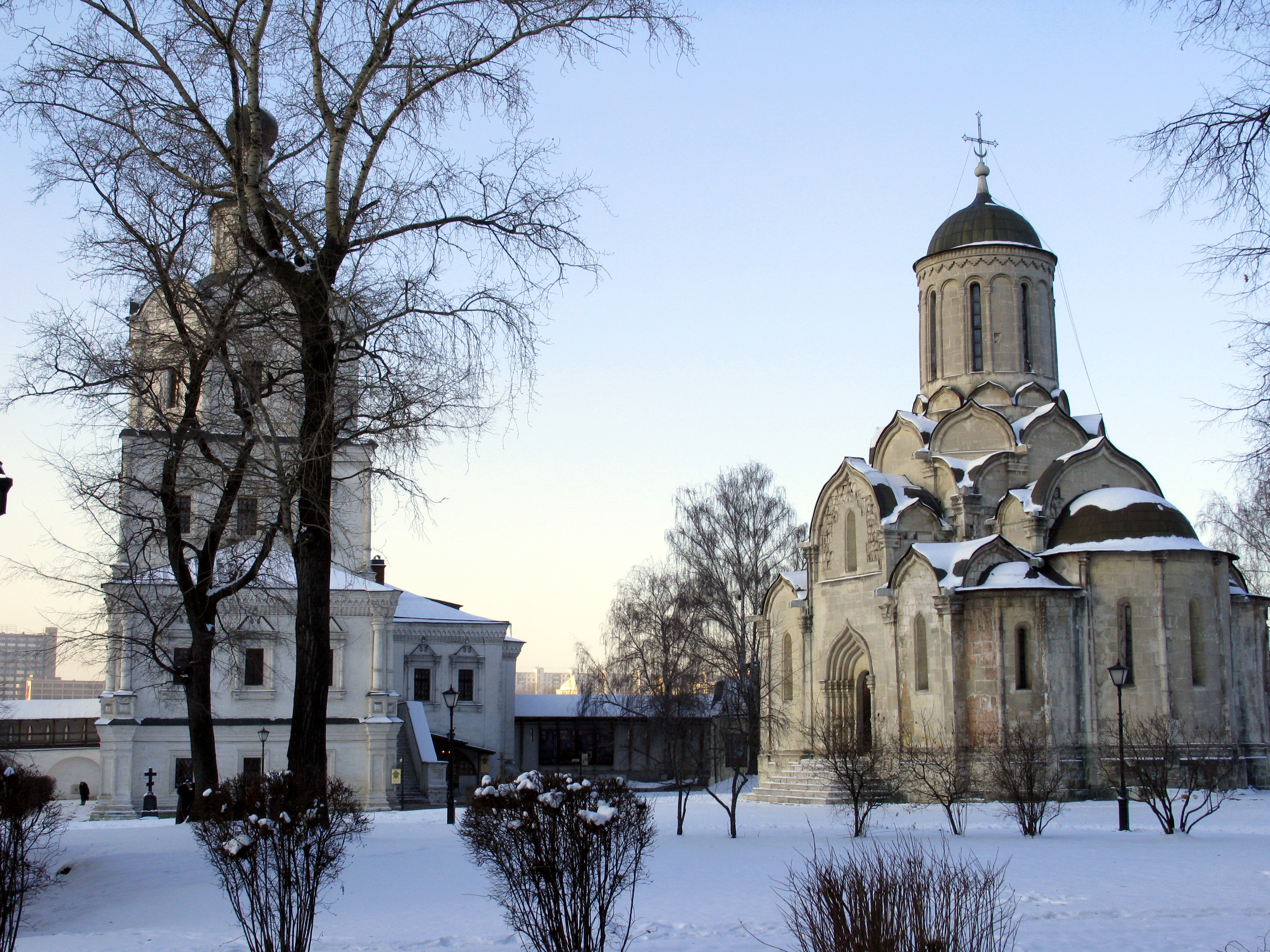
Spassky Cathedral in Moscow

=== Albania ===
- Pogradec^{1}

=== Andorra ===
- Canillo^{1}
- El Pas de la Casa^{1} (bordering Dfc)

=== Austria ===
- Baden bei Wien^{1} (bordering Cfb)
- Eisenstadt^{1} (bordering Cfb)
- Innsbruck^{1} (bordering Cfb)
- Klagenfurt^{1}
- Klösterle^{1}
- Krems an der Donau^{1}
- Landeck^{1}
- Villach
- Wiener Neustadt^{1}

=== Belarus ===
- Barysaw
- Brest^{1}
- Gomel
- Grodno
- Minsk
- Pinsk
- Vitebsk

=== Bosnia and Herzegovina ===
- Goražde^{1}
- Istočno Sarajevo^{1}
- Livno^{1}

=== Bulgaria ===
- Pazardzhik^{1} (bordering Cfa)
- Pernik^{1}
- Pleven^{1}
- Ruse^{1} (bordering Cfa)
- Smolyan^{1} (Dsb)
- Sofia^{1} (bordering Cfa/Cfb)
- Veliko Tarnovo^{1}
- Vidin^{1} (bordering Cfa)
- Vratsa^{1}

=== Croatia ===
- Gospić^{1}

=== Czech Republic ===
- Brno^{1} (bordering Cfb)
- České Budějovice^{1} (bordering Cfb)
- Jihlava^{1}
- Karlovy Vary^{1}
- Liberec^{1}
- Olomouc^{1}
- Ostrava^{1}
- Pardubice^{1} (bordering Cfb)
- Ústí nad Labem^{1}

=== Estonia ===
- Hiiumaa^{1}
- Pärnu
- Saaremaa^{1}
- Tallinn
- Tartu

=== Finland ===
- Åland^{1}
- Hämeenlinna
- Helsinki
- Kouvola
- Kuopio (bordering Dfc)
- Lahti (bordering Dfc)
- Lappeenranta
- Pori
- Tampere (bordering Dfc)
- Turku
- Vaasa

=== France ===
- Chamonix^{1}
- Mouthe^{1}
- Saint-Véran^{1} (bordering Dfc)

=== Germany ===
- Ansbach^{1}
- Augsburg^{1} (bordering Cfb)
- Bayreuth^{1}
- Garmisch-Partenkirchen^{1}
- Görlitz^{1} (bordering Cfb)
- Ingolstadt^{1}
- Kempten^{1}
- Passau^{1}
- Regensburg^{1} (bordering Cfb)
- Sigmaringen^{1}
- Ulm^{1}
- Villingen-Schwenningen^{1}
- Weiden in der Oberpfalz^{1}

=== Greece ===
- Aetomilitsa^{1}
- Kato Vermio^{1}
- Samarina^{1}

=== Hungary ===
- Békéscsaba^{1}
- Debrecen^{1} (bordering Cfa/Cfb)
- Eger^{1}
- Kecskemét^{1} (bordering Cfa/Cfb)
- Miskolc^{1}
- Nyíregyháza^{1}
- Szeged^{1} (bordering Cfa/Cfb)
- Szombathely^{1} (bordering Cfb)
- Szolnok^{1} (bordering Cfa)

=== Italy ===
- Belluno^{1} (bordering Cfb)
- Bruneck
- Cortina d'Ampezzo
- Rhêmes-Notre-Dame^{1}
- Rocca di Mezzo^{1} (bordering Cfb)
- Toblach

=== Kazakhstan ===
- Oral (bordering BSk)

=== Kosovo ===
- Pristina^{1} (disputed with Serbia)

=== Latvia ===
- Daugavpils
- Jelgava^{1}
- Liepāja^{1}
- Riga^{1}

=== Liechtenstein ===
- Schaan^{1} (bordering Cfb)

=== Lithuania ===
- Kaunas
- Klaipėda^{1}
- Šiauliai^{1}
- Vilnius

=== Moldova ===
- Bălți
- Briceni
- Chișinău^{1}
- Comrat^{1}

==== Transnistria ====
- Tiraspol^{1} (disputed with Moldova)

=== Montenegro ===
- Pljevlja^{1}
- Žabljak^{1}

=== North Macedonia ===
- Berovo^{1}
- Bitola^{1}

=== Norway ===
- Bodø^{1} (bordering Dfc)
- Drammen
- Hamar
- Lillehammer (bordering Dfc)
- Oslo^{1}
- Sarpsborg^{1}
- Steinkjer^{1}
- Trondheim^{1}

=== Poland ===
- Białystok^{1}
- Bydgoszcz^{1}
- Gdańsk^{1}
- Katowice^{1}
- Kielce^{1}
- Kraków^{1}
- Łódź^{1}
- Lublin^{1}
- Olsztyn^{1}
- Poznań^{1} (bordering Cfb)
- Rzeszów^{1}
- Suwałki
- Toruń^{1} (bordering Cfb)
- Warsaw^{1} (bordering Cfb)

=== Romania ===
- Arad^{1} (bordering Cfa)
- Bacǎu^{1}
- Botoșani^{1}
- Brașov
- Bucharest^{1}
- Buzău^{1}
- Cluj-Napoca^{1}
- Craiova^{1}
- Deva^{1}
- Fundata
- Galați^{1}
- Iași^{1}
- Miercurea Ciuc
- Oradea^{1}
- Ploiești^{1}
- Râmnicu Vâlcea^{1} (bordering Cfa)
- Sibiu^{1}
- Suceava^{1}
- Târgu Mureș

=== Russia ===
- Belgorod
- Bryansk
- Buynaksk^{1}
- Cheboksary
- Cherkessk
- Elista
- Grozny^{1}
- Izhevsk
- Kaliningrad^{1}
- Kazan
- Kirov
- Kursk
- Magas^{1}
- Moscow
- Nalchik^{1}
- Nizhny Novgorod
- Orenburg
- Pskov
- Perm
- Penza
- Petrozavodsk (bordering Dfc)
- Rostov-on-Don
- Ryazan
- Saint Petersburg
- Samara
- Saransk
- Saratov
- Smolensk
- Stavropol^{1}
- Taganrog^{1}
- Tula
- Tver
- Ufa
- Ulyanovsk
- Vladikavkaz^{1}
- Vladimir
- Volgograd (bordering BSk)
- Voronezh
- Yaroslavl
- Yeysk^{1}
- Yoshkar-Ola

=== Serbia ===
- Nova Varoš^{1}
- Subotica^{1}
- Zaječar^{1}

=== Slovakia ===
- Banská Bystrica^{1}
- Košice^{1}
- Nitra^{1} (bordering Cfa/Cfb)
- Poprad
- Prešov^{1}
- Trenčín^{1}
- Trnava^{1}
- Žilina^{1}

=== Slovenia ===
- Lendava^{1} (bordering Cfb)
- Murska Sobota^{1}

=== Spain ===
- Puerto de Navacerrada^{1} (Dsb bordering Csb)

=== Sweden ===
- Falun
- Gävle
- Härnösand
- Jönköping^{1}
- Kalmar^{1} (bordering Cfb)
- Karlstad^{1}
- Linköping^{1}
- Norrköping^{1}
- Örebro^{1}
- Stockholm^{1}
- Sundsvall
- Uppsala^{1}
- Västerås^{1}
- Visby^{1} (bordering Cfb)

=== Switzerland ===
- Gstaad
- La Brévine (bordering Dfc)
- La Chaux-de-Fonds^{1}
- Poschiavo^{1}

=== Ukraine ===
- Chernihiv
- Dnipro
- Donetsk (occupied by Russia)
- Izmail^{1} (bordering Cfa)
- Kharkiv
- Kherson^{1}
- Khmelnytskyi
- Kryvyi Rih
- Kyiv
- Luhansk (occupied by Russia)
- Lviv^{1}
- Mariupol^{1} (occupied by Russia)
- Mykolaiv^{1}
- Odesa^{1} (bordering BSk/Cfa)
- Poltava
- Uzhhorod^{1}
- Vinnytsia
- Zaporizhzhia
- Zhytomyr

== North America ==
=== Canada ===
- Baie-Comeau, QC
- Brampton
- Brandon, MB
- Calgary
- Cape Sable Island, NS^{1} (bordering Dfc)
- Castlegar, BC^{1} (Dsb bordering Dfb)
- Charlottetown
- Edmonton
- Fredericton
- Gander, NL
- Grande Prairie, AB (bordering Dfc)
- Goose Bay, NL (bordering Dfc)
- Halifax
- Hamilton, ON
- Kelowna, BC^{1}
- Kenora, ON
- Kitchener, ON
- Laval, QC
- London, ON
- Longueuil, QC
- Lytton^{1} (Dsa bordering BSk/Csa)
- Marystown, NL^{1}
- Mississauga
- Moncton
- Montreal
- Moose Factory
- Murdochville, QC
- Oshawa, ON
- Ottawa
- Penticton, BC^{1} (bordering BSk)
- Prince Albert, SK
- Prince George, BC
- Quebec City
- Red Deer, AL
- Regina (bordering BSk)
- Rimouski, QC
- Sable Island^{1} (bordering Cfb)
- Saguenay, QC
- Saint John, NB
- Saskatoon (bordering BSk)
- Sherbrooke, QC
- St. Catharines, ON
- St. John's, NL
- Stewart, BC^{1}
- Sudbury
- Sydney, NS
- Thunder Bay
- Timmins, ON
- Toronto
- Trois-Rivières, QC
- Val-d'Or, QC
- Vernon, BC
- Windsor
- Winnipeg
- Yarmouth, NS^{1}
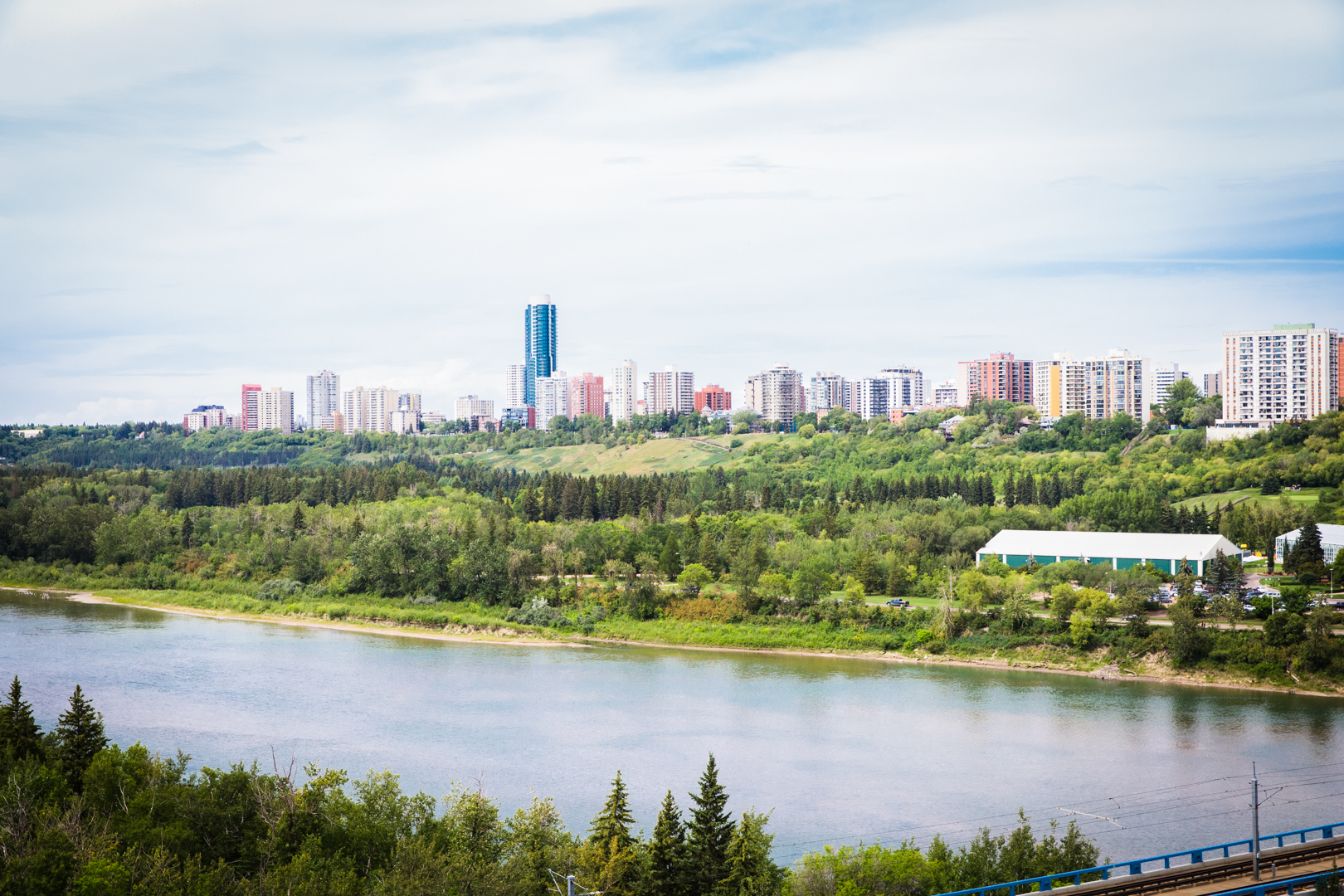
North Saskatchewan River valley in Edmonton

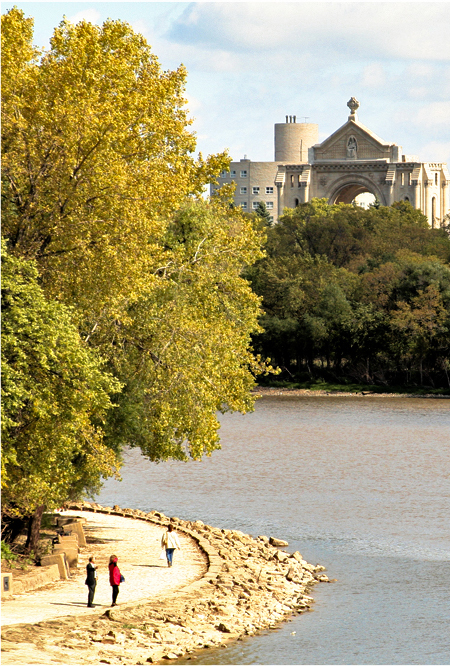
The Forks in Winnipeg

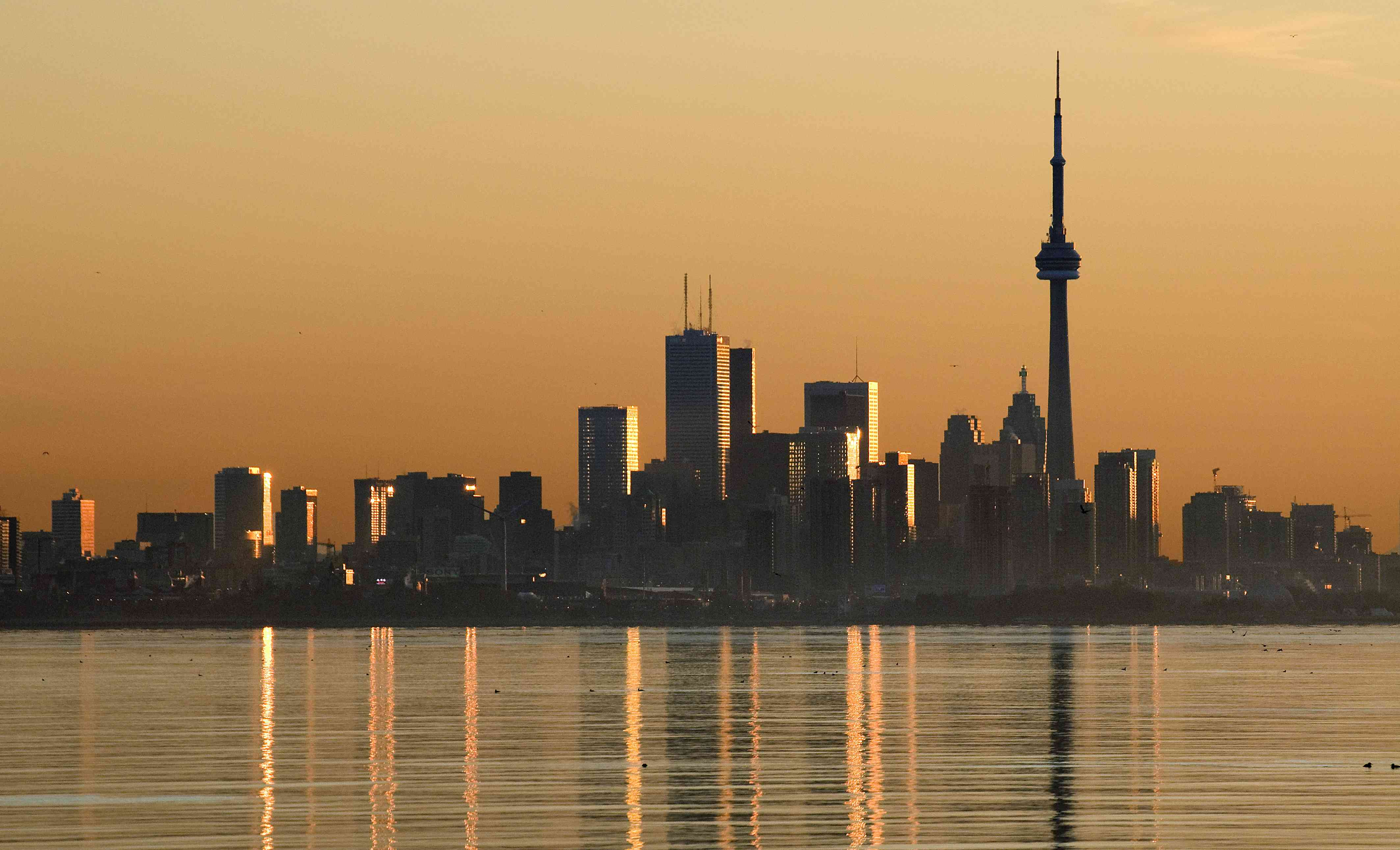
Toronto skyline taken from Colonel Samuel Smith Park in Etobicoke

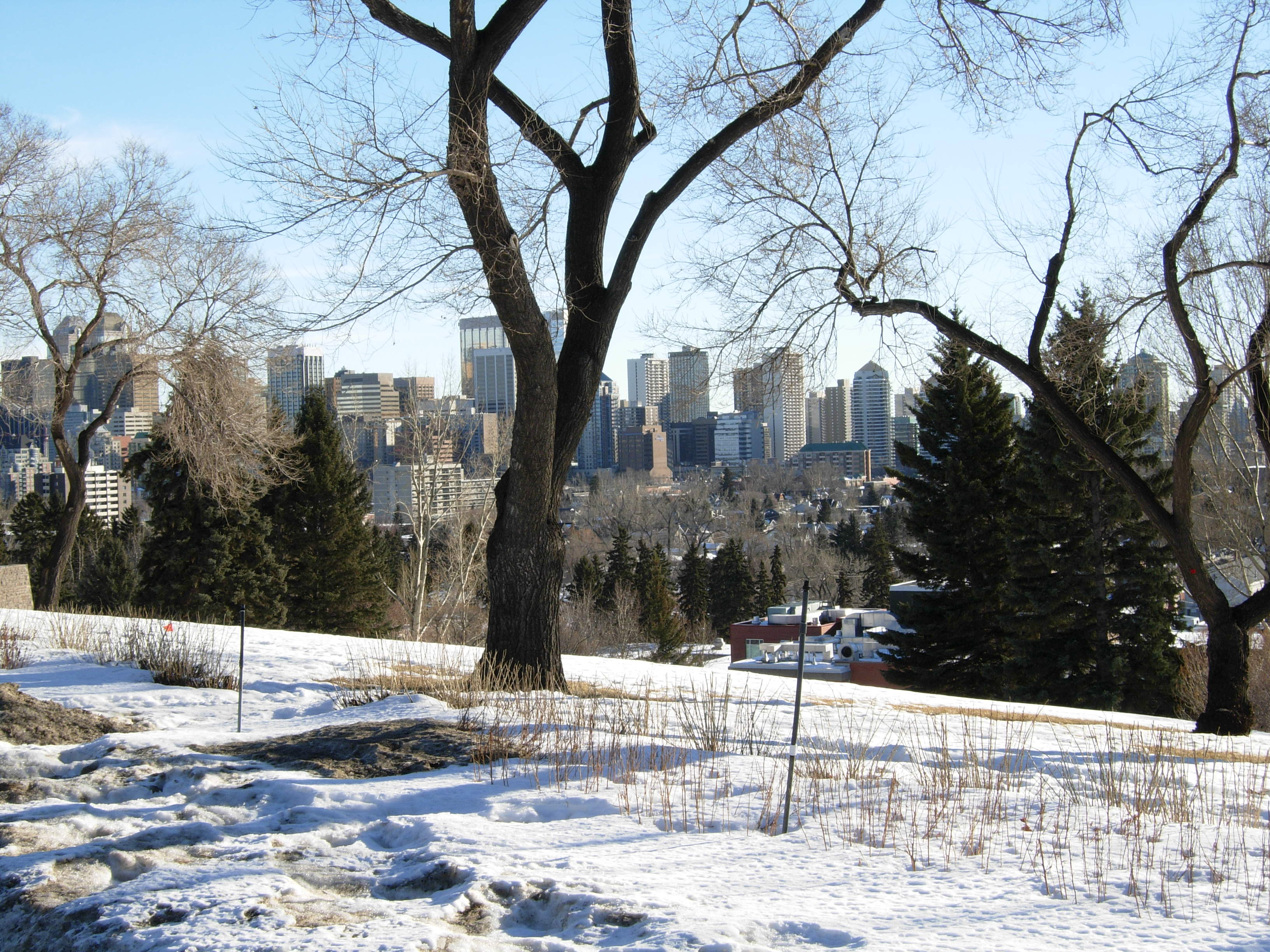
Downtown Calgary from Southern Alberta Institute of Technology (SAIT) campus

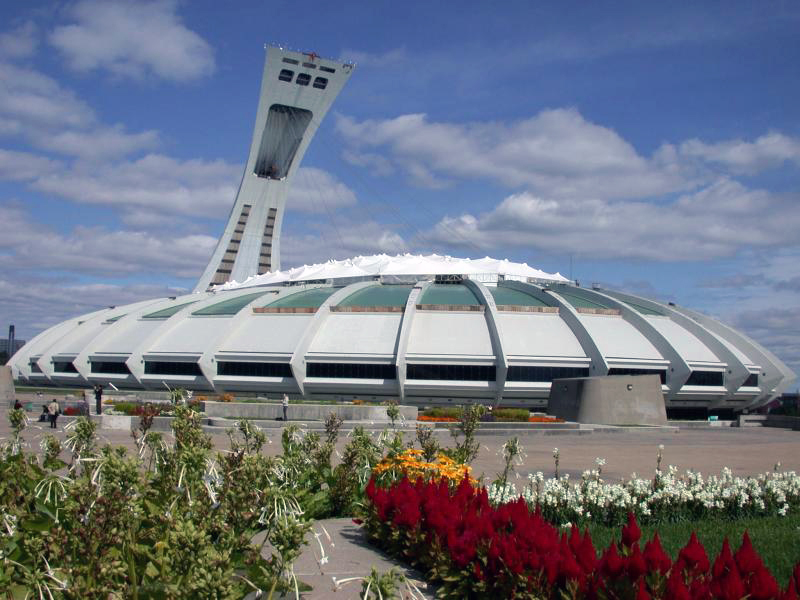
Olympic Stadium in Montreal

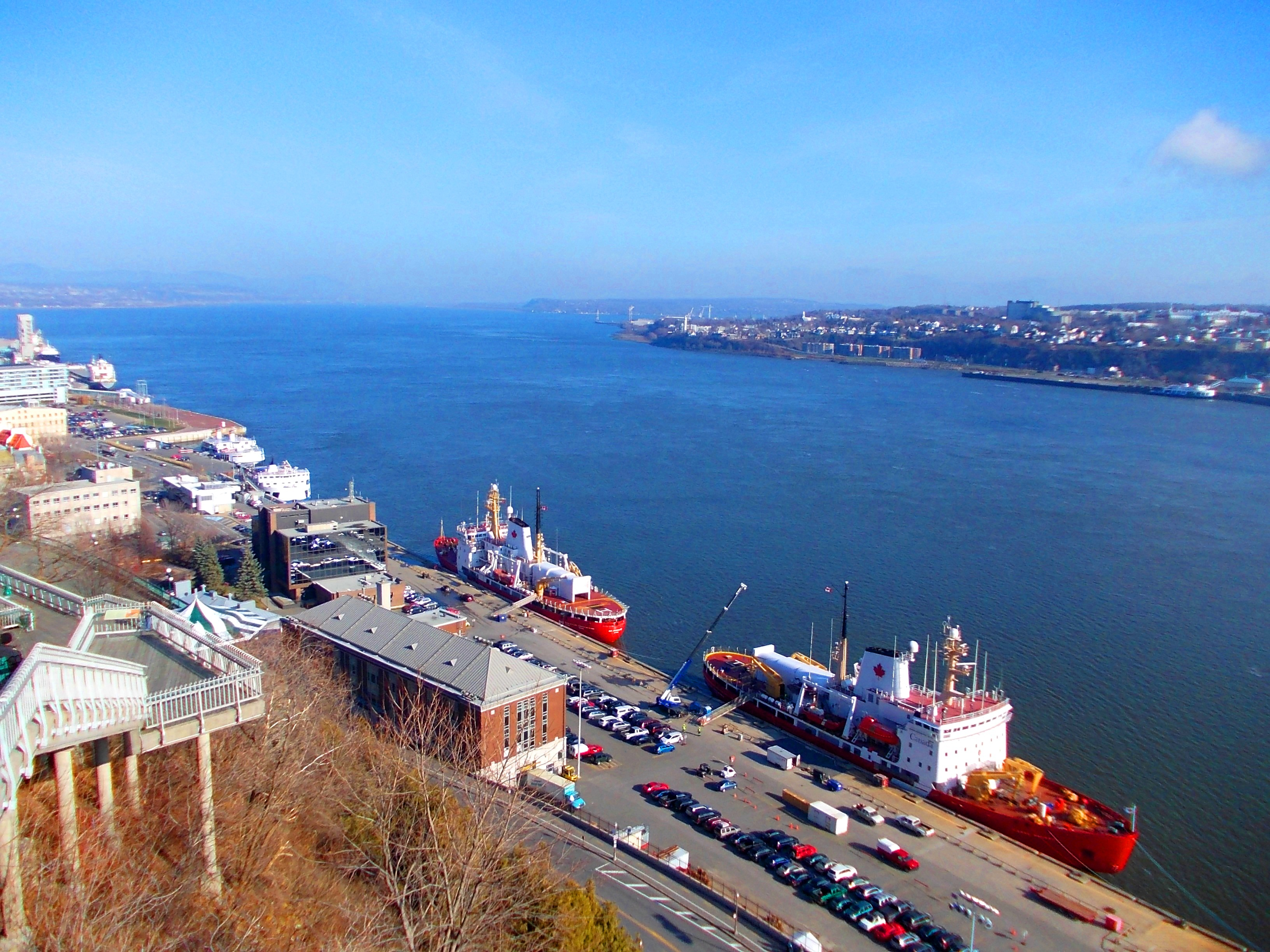
Quebec City shore

=== United States ===
==== Midwest ====
- Aberdeen, SD
- Akron, OH^{1}
- Ann Arbor, MI
- Athens, OH^{1}
- Aurora, IL
- Bismarck, ND
- Bloomington, IL
- Bloomington, IN^{1}
- Cahokia Heights, IL^{1} (bordering Cfa)
- Canton, OH^{1}
- Cedar Rapids, IA
- Champaign, IL
- Chicago
- Chillicothe, OH^{1} (bordering Cfa)
- Cincinnati^{1} (downtown is Cfa)
- Cleveland^{1}
- Columbia, MO^{1} (bordering Cfa)
- Columbus, OH^{1}
- Davenport, IA
- Dayton^{1}
- Decatur, IL^{1}
- Des Moines
- Detroit
- Duluth, MN
- Eau Claire, WI
- Fargo, ND
- Flint, MI
- Florissant, MO^{1} (bordering Cfa)
- Fort Wayne, IN
- Grand Rapids, MI
- Green Bay, WI
- Indianapolis^{1}
- Jefferson City, MO^{1}
- Kalamazoo, MI
- Kansas City^{1} (bordering Cfa)
- Lansing, MI
- Lawrence, KS^{1}
- Lima, OH
- Lincoln, NE
- Madison, WI
- Manhattan, KS^{1}
- Marietta, OH^{1} (bordering Cfa)
- Marquette, MI
- Milwaukee
- Minneapolis
- North Platte, NE
- Omaha
- Oshkosh, WI
- Peoria
- Rapid City, SD (bordering BSk)
- Rochester, MN
- Rockford, IL
- Saginaw, MI
- Salina, KS^{1}
- Scottsbluff, NE^{1}
- Sioux Falls, SD
- South Bend, IN
- Springfield, IL^{1}
- St. Charles, MO^{1}
- St. Cloud, MN
- St. Joseph, MO^{1}
- Toledo, OH^{1}
- Topeka^{1}
- Youngstown, OH^{1}

==== Northeast ====
- Albany
- Allentown, PA^{1}
- Altoona, PA^{1}
- Augusta, ME
- Bangor, ME
- Belvidere, NJ^{1}
- Binghamton, NY
- Boston^{1}
- Bridgeport, CT^{1} (bordering Cfa)
- Brookhaven, NY^{1} (coastal areas are Cfa)
- Buffalo
- Burlington, VT
- Cape Cod^{1} (Outer Cape is Cfb and Woods Hole is Cfa)
- Concord, NH
- Downingtown, PA^{1} (bordering Cfa)
- Doylestown, PA^{1} (bordering Cfa)
- Elmira, NY
- Erie, PA^{1}
- Flemington, NJ^{1}
- Hackensack, NJ^{1} (bordering Cfa)
- Harrisburg^{1} (bordering Cfa)
- Hartford^{1}
- Hazleton, PA
- Huntingdon, NY^{1} (north side is Cfa)
- Islip, NY^{1} (south side is Cfa)
- Ithaca, NY
- Johnstown, PA
- Kingston, NY
- Lancaster, PA^{1} (bordering Cfa)
- Lansdale, PA^{1} (bordering Cfa)
- Lawrence, MA^{1}
- Lewiston, ME
- Lowell, MA
- Mahwah, NJ^{1}
- Manchester, NH
- Matinicus Isle, ME^{1}
- Middletown, NY
- Morristown, NJ^{1}
- Nashua, NH
- New Bedford, MA^{1}
- New Brunswick, NJ^{1} (bordering Cfa)
- New Haven^{1}
- New London, CT^{1} (bordering Cfa)
- Newport, RI^{1} (bordering Cfa/Cfb)
- Paterson, NJ^{1} (bordering Cfa)
- Pittsburgh^{1}
- Plainfield, NJ^{1} (bordering Cfa)
- Plymouth, MA^{1} (bordering Cfa)
- Portland, ME
- Portsmouth, NH
- Pottstown, PA^{1} (airports are Dfa; town is Cfa)
- Poughkeepsie, NY^{1}
- Princeton, NJ^{1} (bordering Cfa)
- Providence, RI^{1}
- Reading, PA^{1}
- Riverhead, NY^{1} (north side is Cfa)
- Rochester
- Scranton, PA^{1}
- Smithtown, NY^{1} (north side is Cfa)
- Somerville, NJ^{1} (bordering Cfa)
- Southampton, NY^{1} (bordering Cfa)
- Springfield, MA
- Stamford, CT^{1} (bordering Cfa)
- State College, PA^{1}
- Sussex, NJ
- Syracuse
- Tiverton, RI^{1} (bordering Cfa)
- Torrington, CT
- Utica, NY
- Waterbury, CT^{1}
- White Plains, NY^{1}
- Williamsport, PA^{1}
- Worcester, MA
- York, PA^{1} (bordering Cfa)

==== South ====
- Beech Mountain, NC^{1}
- Bluefield, WV^{1} (Airport is Dfb; city proper is Cfb)
- Boone, NC^{1} (bordering Cfb)
- Buckhannon, WV^{1} (bordering Cfa)
- Cincinnati/Northern Kentucky International Airport^{1} (bordering Cfa)
- Clifton Forge, VA^{1} (bordering Cfa)
- Cumberland, MD^{1}
- Davis, WV
- Ebright Azimuth, DE^{1} (bordering Cfa)
- Elkins, WV^{1}
- Emmitsburg, MD^{1} (bordering Cfa)
- Fairmont, WV^{1} (bordering Cfa)
- Hancock, MD^{1}
- Kuwohi, NC/TN
- Marlinton, WV
- Moorefield, WV^{1} (bordering Cfa)
- Mount Mitchell, NC
- Oakland, MD^{1}
- Parkton, MD^{1}
- Parson, WV^{1}
- Romney, WV^{1} (bordering Cfa)
- Wheeling, WV^{1}
- White Sulphur Springs, WV^{1}
- Winchester, VA^{1} (bordering Cfa)

==== Southwest ====
- Alturas, CA^{1} (Dsb bordering BSk/Csb)
- Aspen, CO
- Cortez, CO^{1} (Dsa bordering BSk)
- Craig, CO
- Durango, CO (Dsa)
- Flagstaff, AZ^{1} (Dsb bordering BSk/Csb)
- Logan, UT (Dsa)
- Los Alamos, NM^{1} (bordering BSk)
- Loveland, CO^{1} (bordering BSk)
- Mammoth Lakes, CA^{1} (Dsb)
- Mountain City, NV (bordering BSk)
- Ogden, UT^{1} (Dsa)
- Ouray, CO
- Park City, UT
- Salt Lake City^{1} (Dsa bordering BSk/Csa)
- Santa Fe, NM^{1} (bordering BSk)
- South Lake Tahoe, CA^{1} (Dsb bordering Csb)
- Steamboat Springs, CO
- Tahoe City, CA^{1} (Dsb)
- Taos, NM^{1} (bordering BSk)
- Telluride, CO
- Tusayan, AZ^{1} (Dsb bordering BSk)

==== Northwest ====
- Anaconda, MT (bordering BSk)
- Billings, MT^{1} (bordering BSk)
- Bozeman, MT
- Cambridge, ID (Dsa)
- Cheyenne, WY^{1} (bordering BSk)
- Coeur D'Alene, ID^{1} (Dsb bordering Csb)
- Colville, WA^{1} (Dsb)
- Enterprise, OR
- Fairbanks (bordering Dfc)
- Goldendale, WA^{1} (Dsb)
- Government Camp, OR^{1} (Dsb bordering Csb/Csc/Dsc)
- Haines, AK (Dsb)
- Idaho Falls (bordering BSk)
- Jackson, WY (bordering Dfc)
- Joseph, OR
- Juneau^{1} (bordering Dfc)
- Kalispell, MT
- Klamath Falls, OR^{1} (Dsb)
- Kodiak, AK^{1} (bordering Cfb/Cfc/Dfc)
- La Grande, OR^{1} (Dsb bordering Csb)
- Lakeview, OR^{1} (Dsb)
- Lander, WY
- Long Creek, OR^{1} (Dsb bordering Csb)
- Missoula, MT
- Moscow, ID^{1} (Dsb)
- Nenana, AK (bordering Dfc)
- Newport, WA^{1} (Dsb)
- Orofino, ID^{1} (Dsb bordering Dsa)
- Petersburg, AK^{1}
- Pocatello, ID
- Rexburg, ID
- Skagway, AK (Dsb bordering Dsc)
- Spokane, WA^{1} (Dsb bordering Csa/Csb/Dsa)
- Winthrop, WA (Dsb)
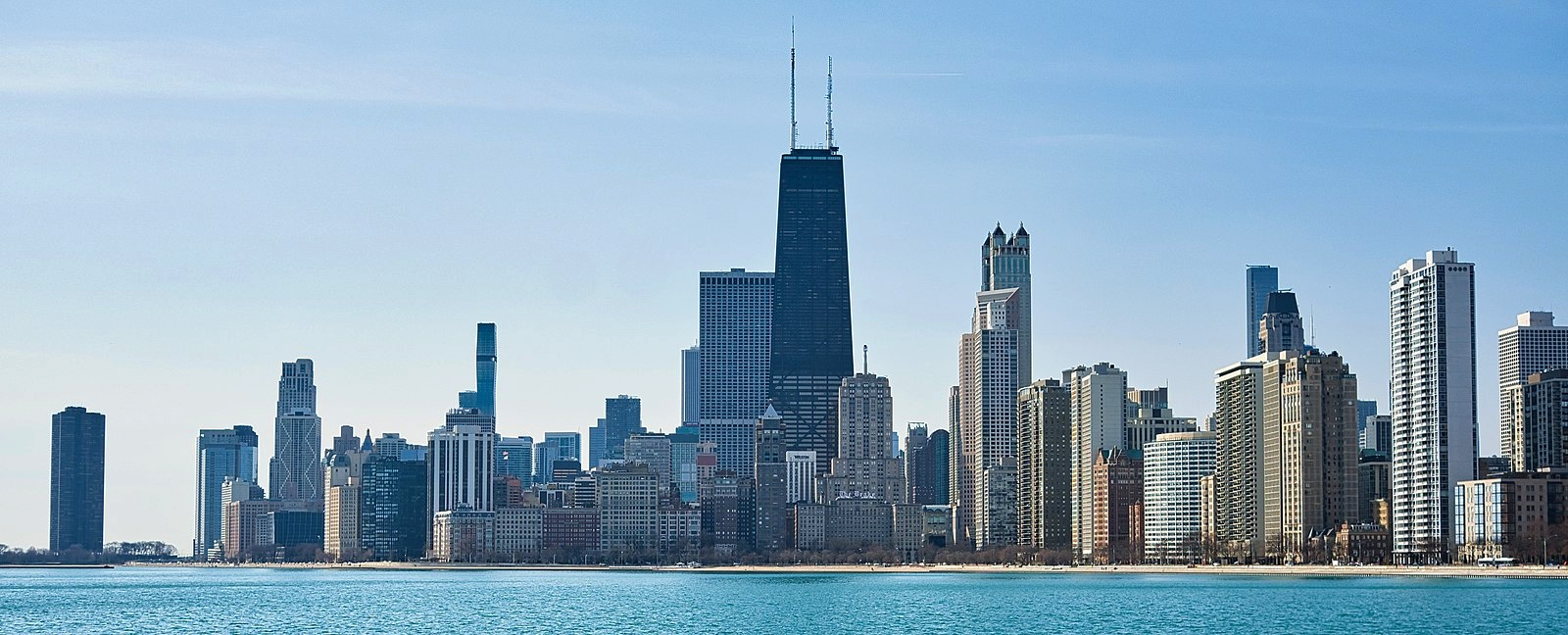
Chicago's Near North Side

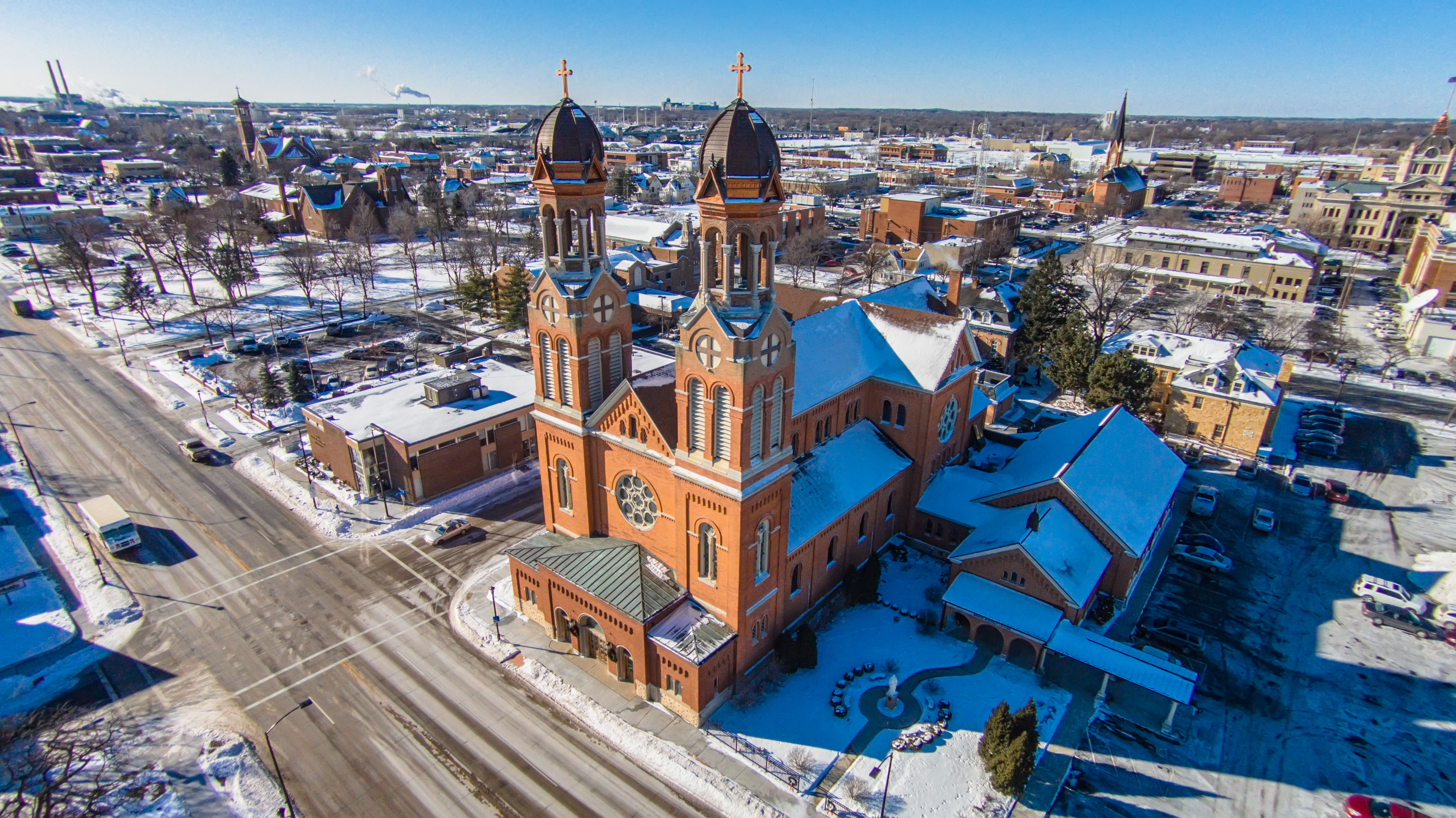
St. Francis Xavier Cathedral, Green Bay, Wisconsin

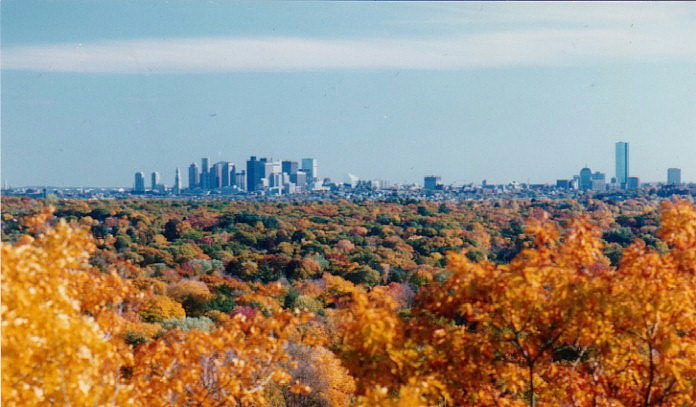
Boston's skyline in the background, with fall foliage in the foreground

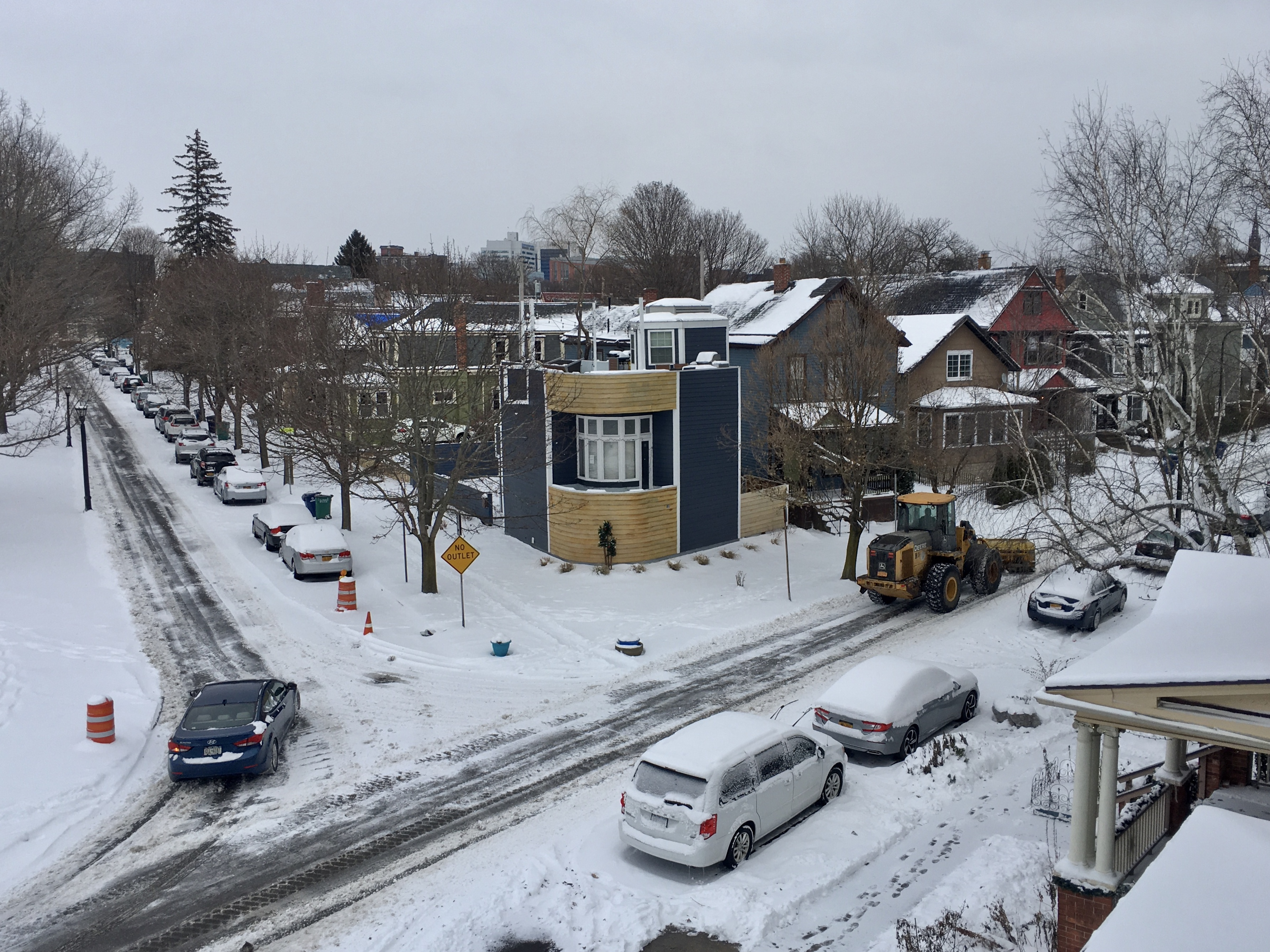
Buffalo after December 2019 snowstorm

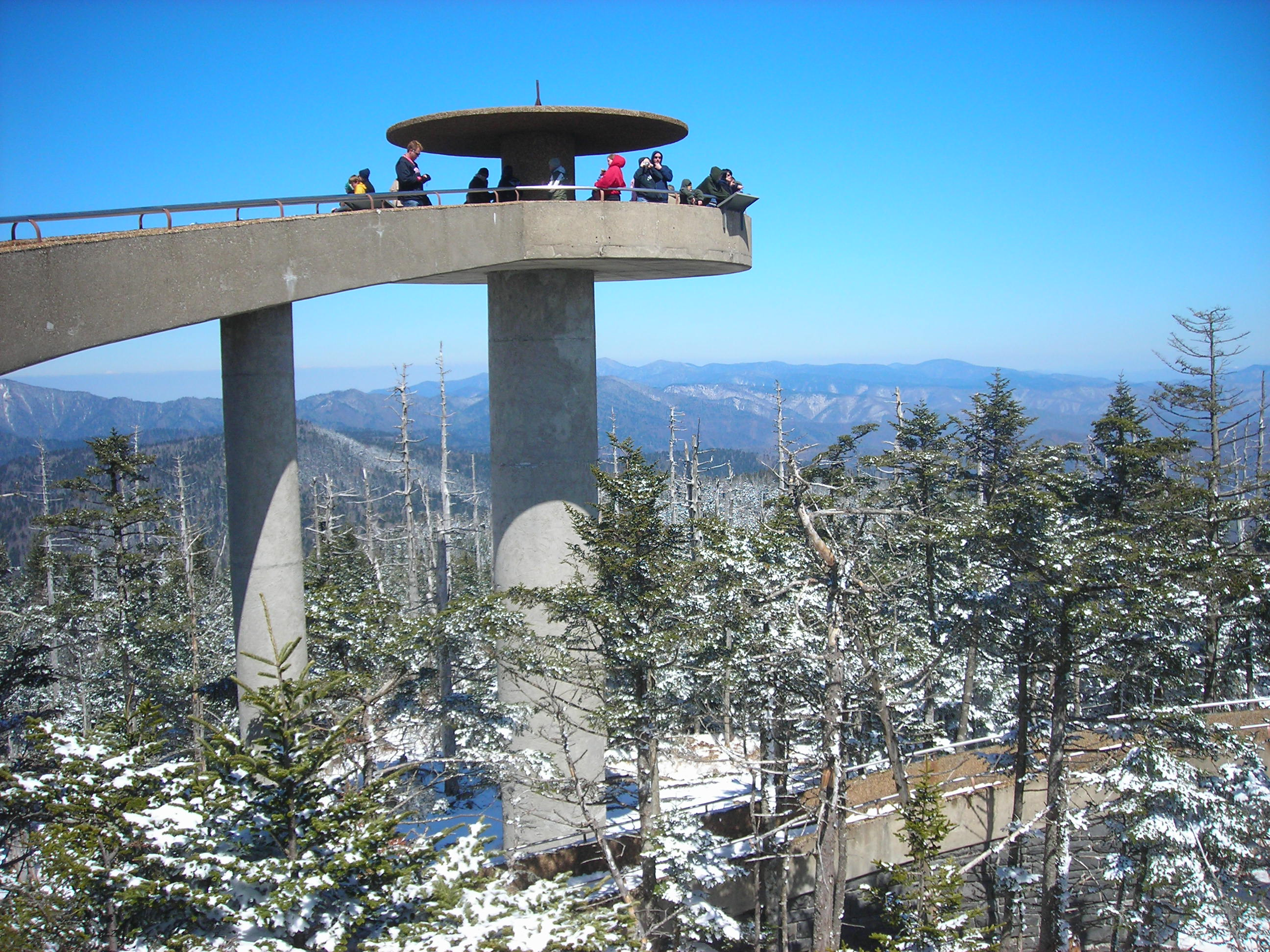
A sunny day with snow on the ground at the observatory on Kuwohi in Great Smoky Mountains National Park, NC/TN

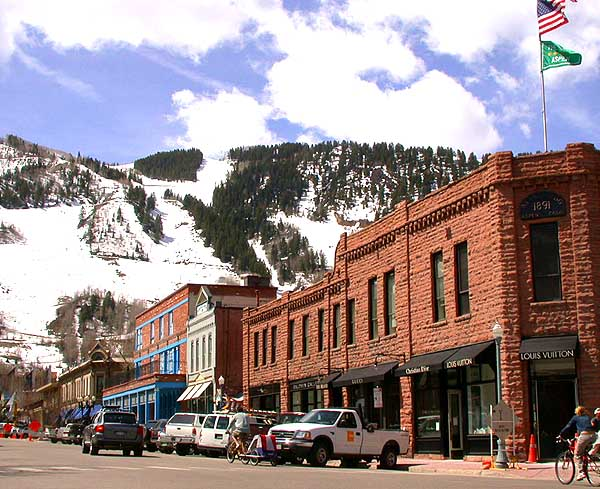
Downtown Aspen, Colorado

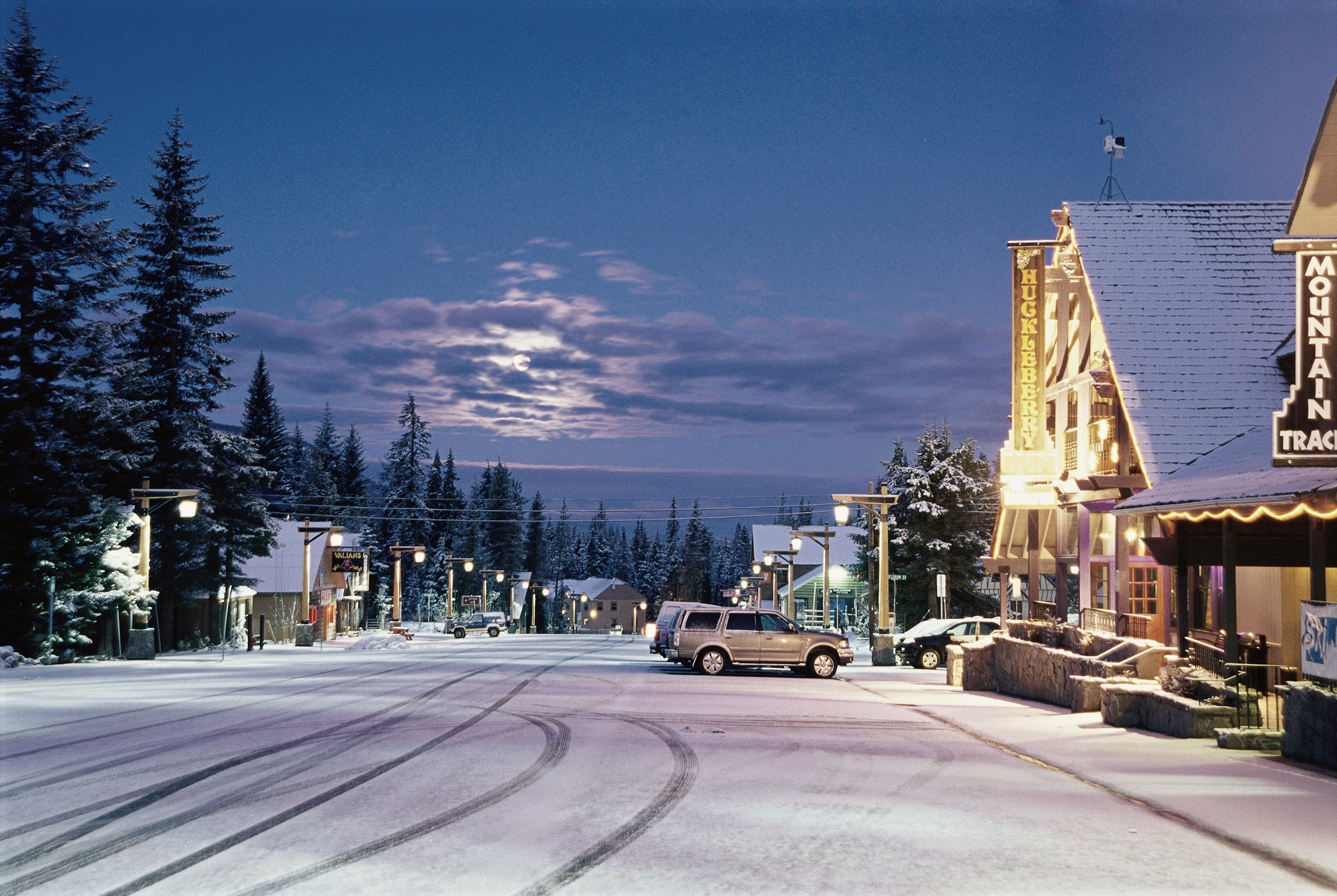
Government Camp, Oregon

== Oceania ==
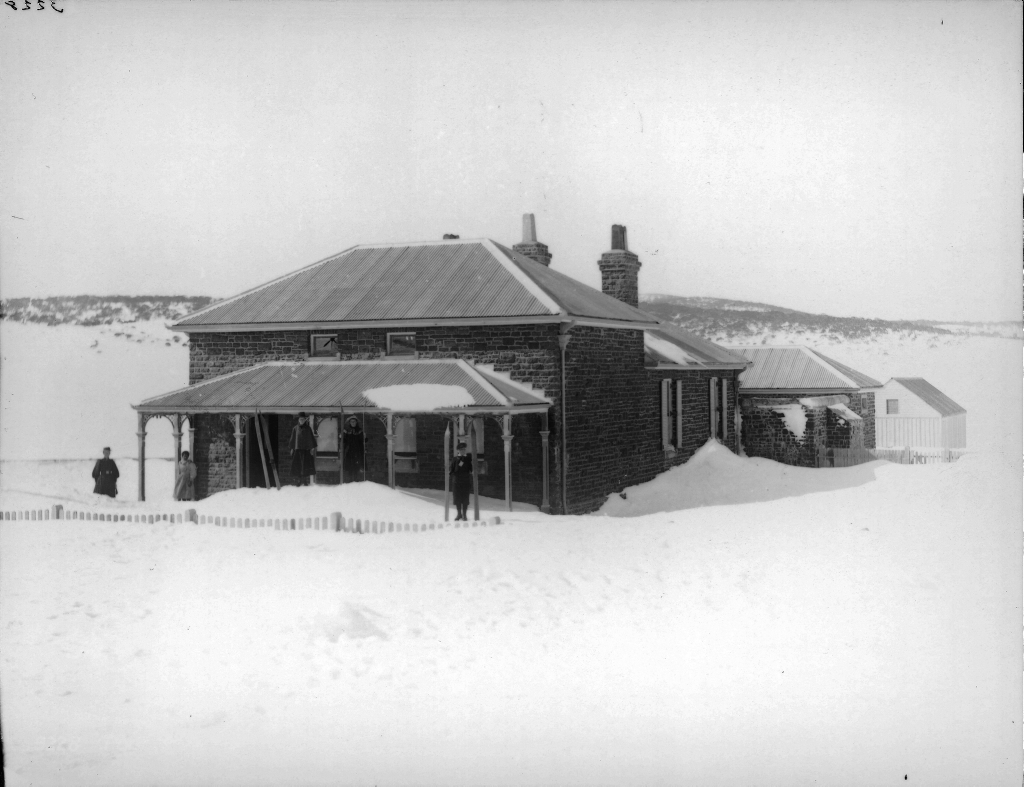
Kiandra police station

=== Australia ===
- Falls Creek^{1}, Victoria (bordering Dfc)
- Kiandra^{1}, New South Wales (bordering Cfb)
- Mount Buller^{1}, Victoria (bordering Cfb/Cfc/Dfc)
- Perisher Valley^{1}, New South Wales (bordering Cfb/Cfc/Dfc)

== South America ==
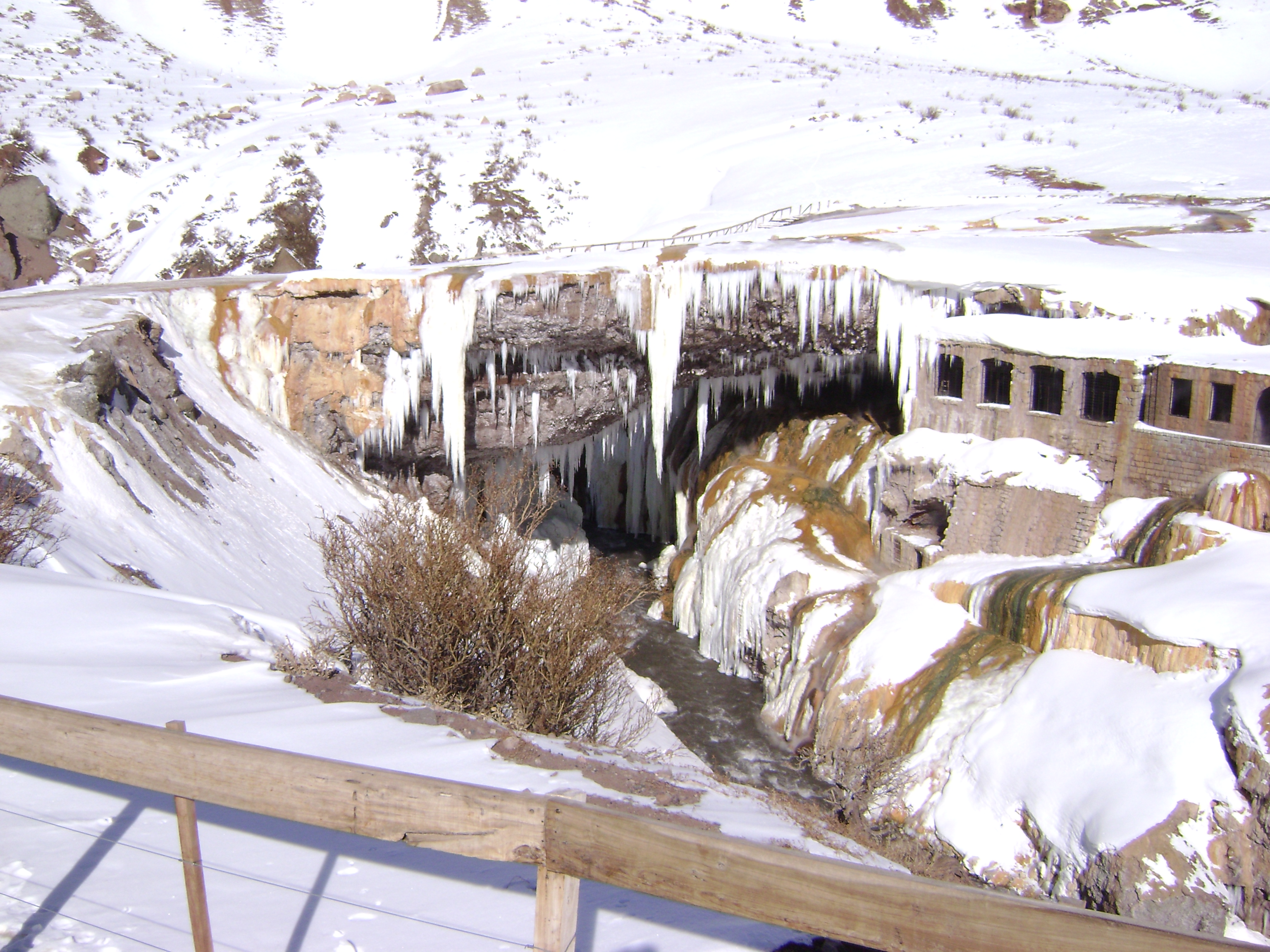
Puente del Inca in July

=== Argentina ===
- Alto Río Senguer^{1}, Chubut Province (Dsb bordering BSk/Csb/Csc/Dsc)
- Las Leñas^{1}, Mendoza Province (Dsb)
- Puente del Inca^{1}, Mendoza Province (Dsb bordering Csb)

== Notes ==
^{^1The climate is continental if the 0 °C coldest-month isotherm is used, but it is temperate if the -3 °C isotherm is used.}
