= Continental climate =

Köppen climate

Areas of the world that feature a continental climate, according to Köppen

Continental climates in the Köppen climate classification often have a significant annual variation in temperature (warm to hot summers and cold winters). They tend to occur in central and eastern parts of the three northern-tier continents (North America and Eurasia), typically in the middle latitudes (40 to 55 or 60°N), often within large landmasses, where prevailing winds blow overland bringing some precipitation, and temperatures are not moderated by oceans.

Continental climates occur mostly in the Northern Hemisphere due to the large landmasses found there. Most of northern and northeastern China, northern Mongolia, most of Korea, central Afghanistan, parts of Kazakhstan and Kyrgyzstan, eastern and southeastern Europe, much of the Russian Federation south of the Arctic Circle, central and southeastern Canada, and the north-central and northeastern United States have this type of climate. Continentality is a measure of the degree to which a region experiences this type of climate.

In continental climates, precipitation tends to be moderate in amount, concentrated mostly in the warmer months. Only a few areas—in the mountains of the Pacific Northwest of North America and in some regions in and around the Persian Plateau (in western Iran, northern Iraq, adjacent Turkey, Afghanistan, northern Pakistan, and Central Asia) — show a winter maximum in precipitation. A portion of the annual precipitation falls as snowfall, and snow often remains on the ground for more than a month.

Summers in continental climates can feature thunderstorms and frequent hot temperatures; however, summer weather is somewhat more stable than winter weather. Continental climates are sometimes included in the broader definition of temperate climates due to their location in the temperate zones, but are classified separately from other temperate climates in the Köppen climate classification system where they are identified by their first letter, a capital D. In the Trewartha climate classification, they are identified as Dc.

== Köppen climate classification ==
Continental climate has at least one month averaging below 0 °C (32 °F) and at least one month averaging above 10 °C (50 °F).

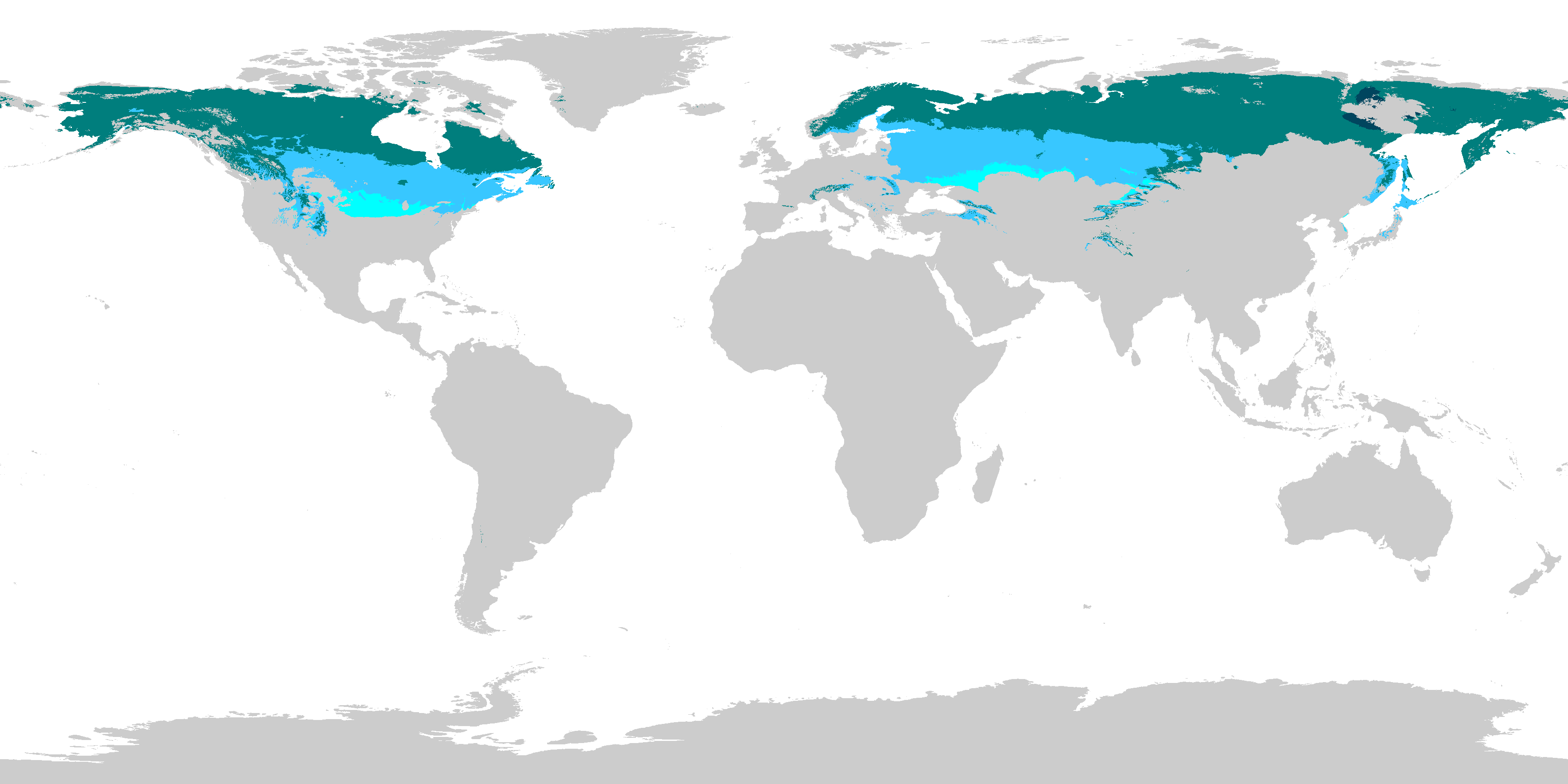
Regions where the continental climates (Dfa, Dfb, Dfc, Dfd) are found as of 1991-2020, using a threshold of −3 °C (27 °F) for the coldest month.: Dfa; Dfb; Dfc; Dfd

- Dfa = Hot-summer humid continental climate; coldest month averaging below 0 °C (32 °F) (or −3 °C (27 °F)), at least one month's average temperature above 22 °C (71.6 °F), and at least four months averaging above 10 °C (50 °F). No significant precipitation difference between seasons (neither the abovementioned set of conditions fulfilled).
- Dfb = Warm-summer humid continental climate; coldest month averaging below 0 °C (32 °F) (or −3 °C (27 °F)), all months with average temperatures below 22 °C (71.6 °F), and at least four months averaging above 10 °C (50 °F). No significant precipitation difference between seasons (neither the abovementioned set of conditions fulfilled).
- Dfc = Subarctic climate; coldest month averaging below 0 °C (32 °F) (or −3 °C (27 °F)) and one–three months averaging above 10 °C (50 °F). No significant precipitation difference between seasons (neither the abovementioned set of conditions fulfilled).
- Dfd = Extremely cold subarctic climate; coldest month averaging below −38 °C (−36.4 °F) and one–three months averaging above 10 °C (50 °F). No significant precipitation difference between seasons (neither the abovementioned set of conditions fulfilled).

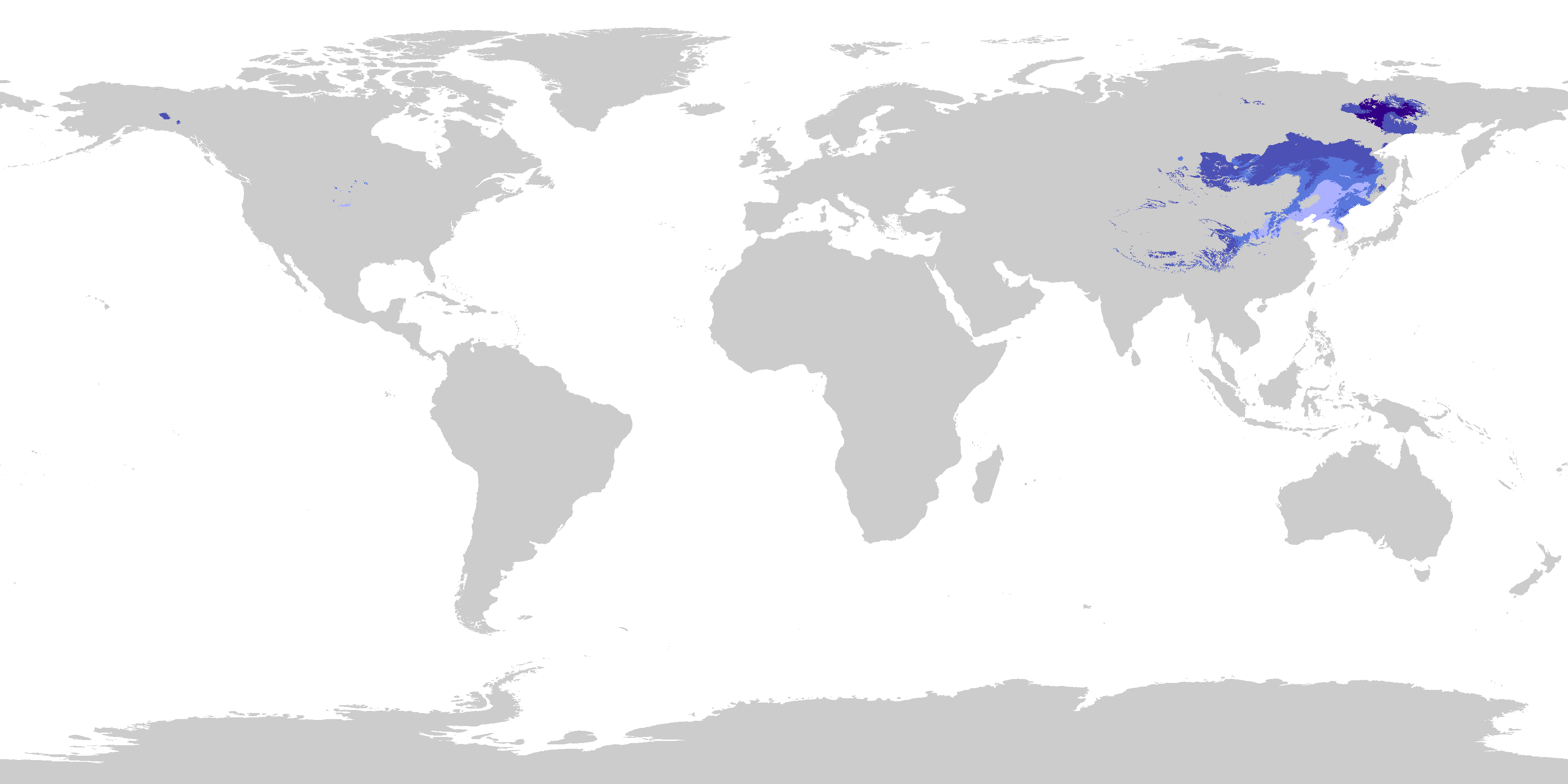
Regions where the Monsoon-influenced continental climates (Dwa, Dwb, Dwc, Dwd) are found as of 1991-2020, using a threshold of −3 °C (27 °F) for the coldest month.: Dwa; Dwb; Dwc; Dwd

- Dwa = Monsoon-influenced hot-summer humid continental climate; coldest month averaging below 0 °C (32 °F) (or −3 °C (27 °F)), at least one month's average temperature above 22 °C (71.6 °F), and at least four months averaging above 10 °C (50 °F). At least ten times as much rain in the wettest month of summer as in the driest month of winter.
- Dwb = Monsoon-influenced warm-summer humid continental climate; coldest month averaging below 0 °C (32 °F) (or −3 °C (27 °F)), all months with average temperatures below 22 °C (71.6 °F), and at least four months averaging above 10 °C (50 °F). At least ten times as much rain in the wettest month of summer as in the driest month of winter.
- Dwc = Monsoon-influenced subarctic climate; coldest month averaging below 0 °C (32 °F) (or −3 °C (27 °F)) and one–three months averaging above 10 °C (50 °F). At least ten times as much rain in the wettest month of summer as in the driest month of winter.
- Dwd = Monsoon-influenced extremely cold subarctic climate; coldest month averaging below −38 °C (−36.4 °F) and one–three months averaging above 10 °C (50 °F). At least ten times as much rain in the wettest month of summer as in the driest month of winter.

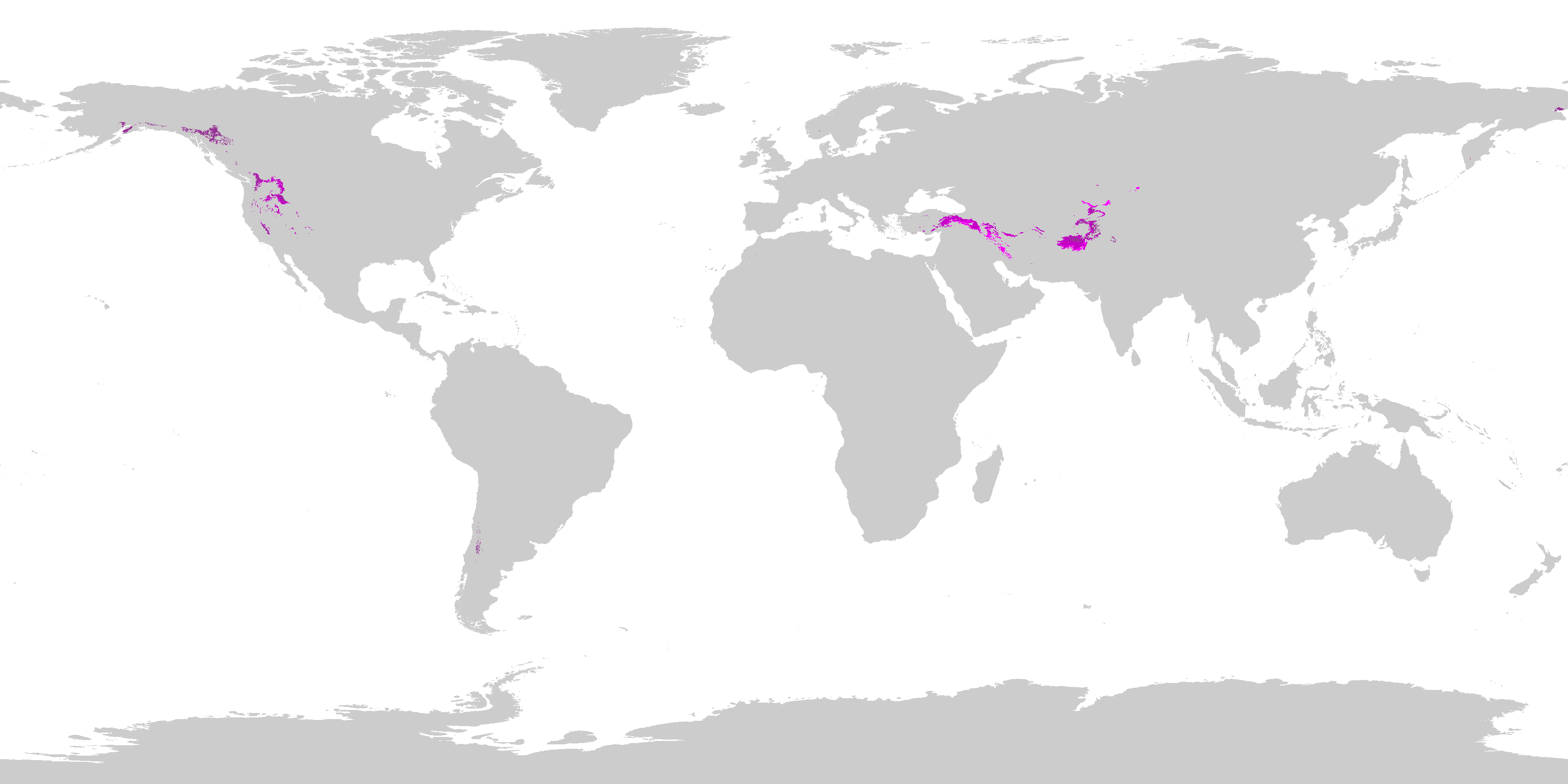
Regions where the Mediterranean-influenced continental climates (Dsa, Dsb, Dsc, Dsd) are found as of 1991-2020, using a threshold of −3 °C (27 °F) for the coldest month.: Dsa; Dsb; Dsc; Dsd

- Dsa = Mediterranean-influenced hot-summer humid continental climate; coldest month averaging below 0 °C (32 °F) (or −3 °C (27 °F)), average temperature of the warmest month above 22 °C (71.6 °F) and at least four months averaging above 10 °C (50 °F). At least three times as much precipitation in the wettest month of winter as in the driest month of summer, and the driest month of summer receives less than 30 mm (1.2 in).
- Dsb = Mediterranean-influenced warm-summer humid continental climate; coldest month averaging below 0 °C (32 °F) (or −3 °C (27 °F)), average temperature of the warmest month below 22 °C (71.6 °F) and at least four months averaging above 10 °C (50 °F). At least three times as much precipitation in the wettest month of winter as in the driest month of summer, and the driest month of summer receives less than 30 mm (1.2 in).
- Dsc = Mediterranean-influenced subarctic climate; coldest month averaging below 0 °C (32 °F) (or −3 °C (27 °F)) and one–three months averaging above 10 °C (50 °F). At least three times as much precipitation in the wettest month of winter as in the driest month of summer, and the driest month of summer receives less than 30 mm (1.2 in).
- Dsd = Mediterranean-influenced extremely cold subarctic climate; coldest month averaging below −38 °C (−36.4 °F) and one–three months averaging above 10 °C (50 °F). At least three times as much precipitation in the wettest month of winter as in the driest month of summer, and the driest month of summer receives less than 30 mm (1.2 in).

== Seasons ==
Annual precipitation in this zone is usually between 600 millimetres (24 in) and 1,200 millimetres (47 in). The timing of intermediate spring-like or autumn-like temperatures in this zone vary depending on latitude and/or elevation. For example, in the Northern Hemisphere, spring may arrive as late as May in the northern parts of this zone, or early as March in the southern parts. In the Southern Hemisphere, spring may arrive as soon as September in the northern parts of this zone, or as late as November in the southern parts. Summers are warm or hot while winters are below freezing and sustain lots of frost.

== Climatology ==
Continental climates exist where cold air masses infiltrate during the winter from shorter days and warm air masses form in summer under conditions of high sun and longer days. Places with continental climates are as a rule either far from any moderating effect of oceans or are so situated that prevailing winds tend to head offshore. Such regions get quite warm in the summer, achieving temperatures characteristic of tropical climates but are colder than any other climates of similar latitude in the winter.

== See also ==
- Hemiboreal climate
- Humid continental climate
- Microthermal climate
- Subarctic climate
- List of cities with a continental climate
