= Chupungnyeong =

Mountain pass in South Korea

Coordinates: 36°12′24″N 128°00′18″E

- Hangul: 추풍령
- Hanja: 秋風嶺
- RR: Chupungnyeong
- MR: Ch'up'ungnyŏng

Chupungnyeong is a mountain pass between Yeongdong-gun, Chungcheongbuk-do and Gimcheon-si, Gyeongsangbuk-do in South Korea.

== Summary ==
It lies in the Sobaek Mountains, and it was a border between Jinhan and Mahan in Proto–Three Kingdoms period and Silla and Baekje in Three Kingdoms period. Now it is a border between Chungcheongbuk-do and Gyeongsangbuk-do, Hoseo and Yeongnam. Korail Gyeongbu Line, Route 4 and Gyeongbu Expressway pass through it, and it is the highest point in Gyeongbu Line. There is a meteorological observatory controlled by Daejeon Area Meteorological Administration. As a name of administrative divisions, it is one of myeon in Yeongdong-gun and ri in Chupungnyeong-myeon.

=== Around ===
- Gyeongbu Line – Chupungnyeong station
- Gyeongbu Expressway Chupungnyeong IC/SA
- Chupungnyeong Meteorological Observatory

== Climate ==
Chupungnyeong has a humid continental climate (Köppen climate classification Dwa) with very warm summers and cold winters. Precipitation is much higher in summer than in winter.

Climate data for Chupungnyeong (1981–2010, extremes 1935–present)
| Month | Jan | Feb | Mar | Apr | May | Jun | Jul | Aug | Sep | Oct | Nov | Dec | Year |
|---|---|---|---|---|---|---|---|---|---|---|---|---|---|
| Record high °C (°F) | 14.6 (58.3) | 21.7 (71.1) | 27.7 (81.9) | 31.3 (88.3) | 35.4 (95.7) | 36.2 (97.2) | 39.8 (103.6) | 38.0 (100.4) | 35.2 (95.4) | 30.8 (87.4) | 25.3 (77.5) | 21.0 (69.8) | 39.8 (103.6) |
| Mean daily maximum °C (°F) | 2.6 (36.7) | 5.5 (41.9) | 11.3 (52.3) | 18.8 (65.8) | 23.4 (74.1) | 26.6 (79.9) | 28.4 (83.1) | 28.9 (84.0) | 24.9 (76.8) | 19.8 (67.6) | 12.3 (54.1) | 5.5 (41.9) | 17.3 (63.1) |
| Daily mean °C (°F) | −2.0 (28.4) | 0.2 (32.4) | 5.2 (41.4) | 12.1 (53.8) | 17.0 (62.6) | 20.9 (69.6) | 23.7 (74.7) | 24.1 (75.4) | 19.3 (66.7) | 13.1 (55.6) | 6.4 (43.5) | 0.4 (32.7) | 11.7 (53.1) |
| Mean daily minimum °C (°F) | −6.2 (20.8) | −4.5 (23.9) | −0.2 (31.6) | 5.3 (41.5) | 10.7 (51.3) | 15.8 (60.4) | 20.1 (68.2) | 20.4 (68.7) | 14.6 (58.3) | 7.5 (45.5) | 1.1 (34.0) | −4.1 (24.6) | 6.7 (44.1) |
| Record low °C (°F) | −17.8 (0.0) | −16.2 (2.8) | −11.8 (10.8) | −5.0 (23.0) | 1.7 (35.1) | 5.7 (42.3) | 11.5 (52.7) | 11.5 (52.7) | 4.1 (39.4) | −4.6 (23.7) | −10.7 (12.7) | −17.2 (1.0) | −17.8 (0.0) |
| Average precipitation mm (inches) | 24.5 (0.96) | 34.5 (1.36) | 50.0 (1.97) | 69.6 (2.74) | 84.5 (3.33) | 146.3 (5.76) | 284.6 (11.20) | 244.5 (9.63) | 139.1 (5.48) | 43.9 (1.73) | 41.3 (1.63) | 24.2 (0.95) | 1,187.1 (46.74) |
| Average precipitation days (≥ 0.1 mm) | 8.6 | 7.9 | 9.7 | 8.1 | 8.8 | 10.0 | 15.7 | 14.6 | 9.6 | 6.0 | 8.1 | 8.4 | 115.5 |
| Average snowy days | 10.6 | 7.3 | 4.4 | 0.3 | 0.0 | 0.0 | 0.0 | 0.0 | 0.0 | 0.2 | 2.2 | 8.0 | 33.0 |
| Average relative humidity (%) | 61.8 | 59.8 | 58.3 | 55.9 | 63.1 | 71.6 | 80.5 | 80.5 | 77.9 | 71.1 | 66.7 | 63.9 | 67.6 |
| Mean monthly sunshine hours | 174.3 | 173.0 | 196.0 | 216.5 | 227.4 | 182.2 | 144.6 | 157.9 | 165.8 | 202.2 | 170.2 | 166.3 | 2,176.4 |
| Percentage possible sunshine | 56.3 | 56.5 | 52.9 | 55.0 | 52.0 | 41.6 | 32.5 | 37.6 | 44.5 | 57.9 | 55.3 | 55.1 | 48.9 |
Source: Korea Meteorological Administration (percent sunshine and snowy days)
