= List of cities by Köppen climate classification =

Cities can be grouped according to their Köppen climate classification. This list contains settlements with non-zero population from around the globe. To maintain diversity, no more than five settlements per country are in each section.

== Af: Tropical rainforest climate ==
- Adamstown, Pitcairn Islands
- Alofi, Niue, New Zealand
- Antalaha, Madagascar
- Apia, Samoa
- Atuona, Hiva Oa, French Polynesia
- Avarua, Cook Islands
- Bandar Seri Begawan, Brunei
- Bluefields, Nicaragua
- Bocas del Toro, Panama
- Boende, Democratic Republic of the Congo
- Buenaventura, Colombia
- Castries, Saint Lucia (bordering on Am)
- Changuinola, Panama
- Colombo, Sri Lanka
- Davao, Philippines
- Fort Lauderdale, Florida, United States (bordering on Am)
- Funafuti, Tuvalu
- Georgetown, Guyana
- Hagåtña, Guam
- Hamilton, Bermuda (bordering on Cfa)
- Hanga Roa, Easter Island, Chile (bordering on Cfa)
- Higüey, Dominican Republic (bordering on Am)
- Hilo, Hawaii, United States
- Honiara, Solomon Islands
- Innisfail, Queensland, Australia
- Ipoh, Malaysia
- Iquitos, Peru
- Ishigaki, Japan
- Johor Bahru, Malaysia
- Kampala, Uganda
- Kingstown, Saint Vincent and the Grenadines
- Kisumu, Kenya
- Koror, Palau
- Kuala Lumpur, Malaysia
- Kuching, Malaysia
- Kurunegala, Sri Lanka (bordering on Am)
- La Ceiba, Honduras
- Lae, Papua New Guinea
- Majuro, Marshall Islands
- Manaus, Brazil
- Mata Utu, Wallis and Futuna, French Polynesia
- Medan, Indonesia
- Miyako Island, Japan
- Moroni, Comoros
- Nakhon Si Thammarat, Thailand
- Narathiwat, Thailand (bordering on Am)
- Ngerulmud, Palau
- Nukuʻalofa, Tonga
- Orchid Island, Taiwan
- Padang, Indonesia
- Pago Pago, American Samoa
- Palembang, Indonesia
- Palikir, Micronesia
- Paramaribo, Suriname
- Pitcairn Island, United Kingdom
- Pointe-à-Pitre, Guadeloupe (bordering on Am)
- Polomolok, Philippines
- Port Antonio, Jamaica
- Port St. Lucie, Florida, United States
- Port Vila, Vanuatu
- Puerto Barrios, Guatemala
- Punta Gorda, Belize
- Puyo, Ecuador
- Quibdó, Colombia
- Ratnapura, Sri Lanka
- Saint-Laurent-du-Maroni, French Guiana
- Salvador, Bahia, Brazil
- Santos, Brazil
- Singapore
- Sri Jayawardenepura Kotte, Sri Lanka (bordering on Am)
- St. George's, Grenada
- Suva, Fiji
- Tabubil, Papua New Guinea
- Tacloban, Philippines
- Tarawa, Kiribati
- Toamasina, Madagascar
- Tubuai, Austral Islands, France
- Victoria, Seychelles
- Villa Tunari, Bolivia
- West Palm Beach, Florida, United States (bordering on Am)
- Yaren, Nauru
- Yonaguni, Japan

== Am: Tropical monsoon climate ==
- Alor Setar, Malaysia
- Aracaju, Brazil
- Baguio, Philippines (lower elevations)
- Bandung, Indonesia (bordering on Af)
- Barrancabermeja, Colombia
- Basseterre, Saint Kitts and Nevis
- Bata, Equatorial Guinea
- Batticaloa, Sri Lanka (bordering on As)
- Belmopan, Belize
- Cà Mau, Vietnam
- Cali, Colombia
- Cairns, Queensland, Australia
- Cayenne, French Guiana (bordering on Af)
- Chichijima, Japan (bordering on Aw and Cfa)
- Chittagong, Bangladesh
- Christmas Island, Australia
- Coatzacoalcos, Veracruz, Mexico
- Conakry, Guinea
- Curepipe, Mauritius
- Da Nang, Vietnam
- David, Panama
- Douala, Cameroon
- Freetown, Sierra Leone
- Fort Myers, Florida, United States (bordering on Cfa)
- Guanare, Venezuela
- Hat Yai, Thailand (bordering on Aw)
- Huế, Vietnam
- Jakarta, Indonesia
- Kisangani, Democratic Republic of the Congo
- Kochi, Kerala, India
- Ko Samui, Thailand (bordering on Af)
- Langkawi, Malaysia
- Libreville, Gabon
- Maceió, Brazil
- Makassar, Indonesia
- Malabo, Equatorial Guinea
- Malé, Maldives
- Mangaluru, Karnataka, India
- Manila, Philippines
- Mérida, Venezuela
- Miami, Florida, United States
- Monrovia, Liberia
- Nassau, The Bahamas (bordering on Aw)
- Papeete, French Polynesia
- Pattani, Thailand
- Phuntsholing, Bhutan (bordering on Cwa)
- Pingtung, Taiwan
- Port Harcourt, Rivers State, Nigeria
- Port of Spain, Trinidad and Tobago
- Pucallpa, Peru
- Puerto Ayacucho, Venezuela
- Puerto Maldonado, Peru
- Qionghai, China
- Quezon City, Philippines
- Recife, Pernambuco, Brazil
- Roseau, Dominica
- Road Town, British Virgin Islands
- Saipan, Northern Mariana Islands, United States (bordering on Af)
- San Juan, Puerto Rico
- Santo Domingo, Dominican Republic
- Sihanoukville, Cambodia
- Sylhet, Bangladesh (bordering on Cwa)
- Taitung, Taiwan
- Thiruvananthapuram, Kerala, India
- Trinidad, Bolivia
- Villahermosa, Mexico
- Wanning, China
- Wenchang, China
- Yangon, Myanmar
- Zanzibar City, Tanzania

== Aw: Tropical savanna climate with dry winters ==
- Abidjan, Ivory Coast
- Abuja, Nigeria
- Bahir Dar, Ethiopia (bordering on Cwb)
- Bamako, Mali
- Bangkok, Thailand
- Bangui, Central African Republic
- Banjul, The Gambia
- Barranquilla, Colombia
- Belo Horizonte, Brazil
- Bengaluru, Karnataka, India
- Bhubaneswar, Odisha, India
- Bissau, Guinea-Bissau
- Bobo-Dioulasso, Burkina Faso
- Brasília, Brazil
- Brazzaville, Republic of the Congo
- Bridgetown, Barbados
- Bujumbura, Burundi
- Cancún, Quintana Roo, Mexico (bordering on Am)
- Cape Coral, Florida, United States
- Caracas, Venezuela
- Cartagena, Colombia
- Chipata, Zambia
- Chinandega, Nicaragua
- Cotonou, Benin
- Cuernavaca, Mexico (bordering on Cwa)
- Dar es Salaam, Tanzania
- Darwin, Northern Territory, Australia
- Denpasar, Bali, Indonesia
- Dhaka, Bangladesh
- Dili, East Timor
- Dongfang, Hainan, China
- Guayaquil, Ecuador
- Gustavia, Saint Barthélemy, France
- Haikou, Hainan, China (bordering on Cwa)
- Havana, Cuba (bordering on Af)
- Ho Chi Minh City, Vietnam
- Hyderabad, Telangana, India (bordering on BSh)
- Jashore, Bangladesh
- Jos, Nigeria
- Juba, South Sudan
- Kano, Nigeria
- Kaohsiung, Taiwan
- Key West, Florida, United States
- Khulna, Bangladesh
- Kigali, Rwanda
- Kingston, Jamaica (bordering on BSh)
- Kinshasa, Democratic Republic of Congo
- Kolkata, West Bengal, India
- Kumasi, Ghana
- Kupang, Indonesia
- Lagos, Nigeria
- Lomé, Togo
- Malanje, Angola (bordering on Cwa and Cwb)
- Managua, Nicaragua
- Mandalay, Myanmar (bordering on BSh)
- Maputo, Mozambique (bordering on BSh)
- Marigot, Saint Martin, France
- Moundou, Chad
- Mumbai, Maharashtra, India (bordering on Am)
- Naples, Florida, United States
- Naypyidaw, Myanmar
- Panama City, Panama
- Philipsburg, Sint Maarten, Netherlands
- Phnom Penh, Cambodia
- Port-au-Prince, Haiti
- Port Louis, Mauritius
- Port Moresby, Papua New Guinea
- Porto-Novo, Benin
- Ponce, Puerto Rico
- Rio de Janeiro, Brazil (bordering on Am)
- San Pedro Sula, Honduras (bordering on Am)
- San Cristóbal Island, Ecuador
- San José, Costa Rica
- San Salvador, El Salvador
- Sansha, Hainan, China
- Santa Cruz de la Sierra, Bolivia (bordering on Af)
- Santiago de Cuba, Cuba
- Sanya, Hainan, China
- St. John's, Antigua and Barbuda
- Surabaya, Indonesia
- Tainan, Taiwan (bordering on Cwa)
- Tangail, Bangladesh
- Tegucigalpa, Honduras
- The Bottom, Saba, The Netherlands
- The Valley, Anguilla, United Kingdom
- Townsville, Queensland, Australia
- Veracruz, Mexico
- Vientiane, Laos
- Villa Nueva, Guatemala
- Wake Island, United States
- Yaoundé, Cameroon
- Ziguinchor, Senegal

== As: Tropical savanna climate with dry summers ==
- Cape Coast, Ghana (both Aw/As)
- Chennai, Tamil Nadu, India (bordering on Aw)
- Fortaleza, Brazil
- Jaffna, Sri Lanka
- Kapalua, Hawaii, United States
- Lānaʻi City, Hawaii, United States
- Mombasa, Kenya
- Natal, Rio Grande do Norte, Brazil
- Nha Trang, Vietnam
- Nouméa, New Caledonia
- São Tomé, São Tomé and Principe
- Trincomalee, Sri Lanka

== BWh: Hot desert climate ==
- ʽAziziya, Jafara, Libya
- Abu Dhabi, United Arab Emirates
- Aden, Yemen
- Agadez, Niger
- Ahvaz, Khuzestan, Iran
- Alice Springs, Northern Territory, Australia
- Almería, Andalusia, Spain (bordering on BSh)
- Arrecife, Canary Islands, Spain
- Arica, Chile
- Ascension Island, United Kingdom
- Aswan, Egypt
- Baghdad, Iraq
- Bakersfield, California, United States (bordering on BSh)
- Bandar Abbas, Hormozgan, Iran
- Basra, Iraq
- Biskra, Algeria
- Cairo, Egypt
- Cartagena, Murcia, Spain
- Chilecito, Argentina (bordering on BWk)
- Coober Pedy, Australia
- Deir ez-Zor, Syria
- Dera Ismail Khan, Pakistan (bordering on BSh)
- Djibouti City, Djibouti
- Doha, Qatar
- Dubai, United Arab Emirates
- Eilat, Southern District, Israel
- El Paso, Texas, United States (bordering on BWk)
- Faya-Largeau, Chad
- Gabès, Tunisia (bordering on BSh)
- Garissa, Kenya
- Hermosillo, Sonora, Mexico (bordering on BSh)
- Iquique, Chile (bordering on BWk)
- Jalalabad, Nangarhar, Afghanistan
- Jamestown, Saint Helena, United Kingdom
- Jeddah, Saudi Arabia
- Jodhpur, Rajasthan, India
- Karachi, Sindh, Pakistan (bordering on BSh)
- Keetmanshoop, Namibia
- Khartoum, Sudan
- Kufra, Libya
- Kuwait City, Kuwait
- Laayoune, Western Sahara
- La Paz, Mexico
- Las Vegas, Nevada, United States
- Lashkargah, Afghanistan
- Lima, Peru
- Luxor, Egypt
- Ma'an, Jordan (bordering on BWk)
- Manama, Bahrain
- Manta, Ecuador
- Mary, Turkmenistan
- Massawa, Eritrea
- Mecca, Makkah Region, Saudi Arabia
- Mexicali, Baja California, Mexico
- Moçâmedes, Angola
- Multan, Pakistan
- Muscat, Oman
- Nouakchott, Mauritania
- Ouarzazate, Morocco
- Phoenix, Arizona, United States
- Praia, Cape Verde
- Puerto del Rosario, Canary Islands, Spain
- Punto Fijo, Venezuela
- Riohacha, Colombia
- Qom, Qom, Iran
- Riyadh, Saudi Arabia
- Sabha, Libya
- Sharm El Sheikh, Egypt
- Tamanrasset, Algeria
- Trujillo, Peru
- Timbuktu, Mali
- Tobruk, Libya
- Tucson, Arizona, United States
- Upington, Northern Cape, South Africa
- Yazd, Yazd, Iran
- Zahedan, Sistan and Baluchestan, Iran

== BWk: Cold desert climate ==
- Aktau, Kazakhstan
- Albuquerque, New Mexico, United States
- Antofagasta, Chile
- Aral, Kazakhstan
- Arequipa, Peru
- Ashgabat, Turkmenistan
- Bamyan, Afghanistan
- Bukhara, Uzbekistan
- Ciudad Juárez, Chihuahua, Mexico (bordering on BWh)
- Dalanzadgad, Mongolia
- Damascus, Syria
- Fergana, Uzbekistan
- Golmud, Qinghai, China
- Isfahan, Isfahan, Iran
- Kalat, Balochistan, Pakistan
- Kerki, Turkmenistan (bordering on BWh)
- Kerman, Kerman, Iran
- Khovd, Mongolia
- Kingman, Arizona, United States
- Kyzylorda, Kazakhstan
- La Serena, Chile
- Leh, India
- Lorca, Spain (bordering on BWh)
- Mendoza, Argentina
- Naâma, Algeria (bordering on BSk)
- Neuquén, Argentina
- Nukus, Karakalpakstan, Uzbekistan
- Ölgii, Mongolia
- St. George, Utah, United States (bordering on BWh)
- San Juan, Argentina (BWk/BWh)
- San Pedro de Atacama, Chile
- Sanaa, Yemen (bordering on BSk)
- Swakopmund, Namibia
- Tabernas, Spain (bordering on BWh)
- Turpan, Xinjiang, China
- Walvis Bay, Erongo Region, Namibia
- Yakima, Washington, United States (bordering on BSk and Dsa)
- Yinchuan, Ningxia, China

== BSh: Hot semi-arid climate ==
- Accra, Ghana (bordering on Aw)
- Agadir, Morocco
- Ahmedabad, Gujarat, India (bordering on Aw)
- Airolaf, Djibouti
- Aguascalientes (city), Mexico
- Aleppo, Syria (bordering on BSk)
- Alexandria, Egypt (bordering on BWh)
- Alicante, Spain
- Barquisimeto, Venezuela
- Benghazi, Libya
- Broome, Western Australia, Australia
- Bulawayo, Zimbabwe
- Bushehr, Bushehr, Iran
- Catamarca, Argentina
- Coimbatore, Tamil Nadu, India
- Dakar, Senegal
- Dezful, Khuzestan, Iran
- Dodoma, Tanzania
- Fresno, California, United States
- Gaborone, Botswana
- Hargeisa, Somalia
- Honolulu, Hawaii, United States
- Huánuco, Peru
- Hyderabad, Pakistan
- Jaipur, Rajasthan, India
- Kandahar, Afghanistan (bordering on BWh)
- Keren, Eritrea
- Kimberley, South Africa
- Kiritimati, Kiribati
- Kurnool, Andhra Pradesh, India
- Laredo, Texas, United States
- La Rioja, Argentina
- Lahore, Punjab, Pakistan (bordering on Cwa)
- Lampedusa, Sicily, Italy
- Luanda, Angola
- Maiduguri, Nigeria
- Mafikeng, South Africa
- Malakal, South Sudan
- Maracaibo, Venezuela
- Mariscal Estigarribia, Paraguay (bordering on Aw)
- Maroua, Cameroon
- Marrakesh, Morocco
- Mogadishu, Somalia
- Monte Cristi, Dominican Republic (bordering on As)
- Monterrey, Mexico (bordering on Cfa)
- Mosul, Nineveh, Iraq (bordering on Csa)
- Mount Isa, Queensland, Australia
- Murcia, Spain
- N'Djamena, Chad
- Niamey, Niger
- Nicosia, Cyprus
- Oranjestad, Aruba
- Ouagadougou, Burkina Faso
- Patos, Paraíba, Brazil
- Peshawar, Pakistan
- Petrolina, Pernambuco, Brazil
- Piraeus, Greece
- Polokwane, South Africa
- Portoviejo, Ecuador
- Querétaro City, Querétaro, Mexico
- Riverside, California, United States
- San Diego, California, United States (bordering on BSk and Csa)
- Safi, Morocco
- Santiago del Estero, Argentina
- Saveh, Markazi, Iran
- Sfax, Tunisia
- Shiraz, Fars, Iran (bordering on BSk)
- Tlemcen, Algeria (bordering on BSk)
- Toliara, Madagascar
- Tripoli, Libya
- Valencia, Spain (bordering on Csa)
- Willemstad, Curaçao
- Windhoek, Namibia
- Yuanmou, Yunnan, China

== BSk: Cold semi-arid climate ==
- Albacete, Spain
- Albuquerque, New Mexico, United States (bordering on BWk)
- Alexandra, New Zealand (bordering on Cfb)
- Amman, Jordan (bordering on BSh and Csa)
- Ankara, Turkey (bordering on Dsa)
- Asmara, Eritrea
- Astrakhan, Russia
- Atyrau, Kazakhstan (bordering on BWk)
- Baku, Azerbaijan (bordering on BWk)
- Batna, Algeria
- Bhisho, South Africa (bordering on BSh and Cfa)
- Bloemfontein, South Africa
- Boise, Idaho, United States
- Cagliari, Sardinia, Italy (bordering on Csa)
- Choibalsan, Mongolia
- Cochabamba, Bolivia
- Comodoro Rivadavia, Argentina
- Daraa, Syria (bordering on BSh)
- Denver, Colorado, United States
- Djelfa, Algeria
- Durango, Mexico
- El Kef, Tunisia (bordering on Csa)
- Eskişehir, Turkey
- Essaouira, Morocco (bordering on BSh)
- Gevgelija, North Macedonia
- Herat, Afghanistan
- Kabul, Afghanistan
- Kalgoorlie, Western Australia, Australia (bordering on BSh/BWh/BWk)
- Kamloops, British Columbia, Canada
- Karaj, Alborz, Iran
- Konya, Turkey
- Kyzyl, Tuva, Russia (bordering on Dwb)
- L'Agulhas, Western Cape, South Africa
- La Quiaca, Jujuy, Argentina
- Lanzhou, Gansu, China
- Lethbridge, Alberta, Canada (bordering on Dfb)
- Lhasa, Tibet, China (bordering on Cwb and Dwb)
- Lubbock, Texas, United States
- Madrid, Spain
- Mafraq, Jordan (bordering on BSh)
- Mashhad, Razavi Khorasan, Iran
- Mazar-i-Sharif, Balkh, Afghanistan (bordering on BSh/BWh/BWk)
- Medicine Hat, Alberta, Canada (bordering on Dfb)
- Mildura, Victoria, Australia (bordering on BSh)
- Mörön, Mongolia
- Namangan, Uzbekistan
- Navoiy, Uzbekistan (bordering on BWk)
- Oujda, Morocco (bordering on BSh)
- Pachuca, Hidalgo, Mexico
- Quetta, Balochistan, Pakistan
- Reno, Nevada, United States (bordering on Csa)
- Saiq, Oman
- Samarkand, Uzbekistan
- Santiago, Chile
- Serhetabat, Turkmenistan
- Sevastopol, Ukraine (bordering on Cfa)
- Shijiazhuang, Hebei, China
- Skardu, Pakistan
- Sulina, Romania
- Taraz, Kazakhstan
- Tarija, Bolivia (bordering on BSh and Cwb)
- Tehran, Tehran, Iran (bordering on BSh and Csa)
- Thala, Tunisia (bordering on Csa)
- Thessaloniki, Greece (bordering on BSh/Cfa/Csa)
- Tianjin, China (bordering on Dwa)
- Turkistan, Kazakhstan
- Ulaanbaatar, Mongolia (bordering on Dwb and Dwc)
- Ulan-Ude, Buryatia, Russia (bordering on Dwb and Dwc)
- Viedma, Argentina
- Yerevan, Armenia (bordering on Dsa)
- Zacatecas City, Zacatecas, Mexico
- Zaragoza, Spain

== Csa: Hot-summer Mediterranean climate ==
- Adelaide, Australia
- Algiers, Algeria
- Angra do Heroísmo, Terceira Island, Portugal (bordering on Csb/Cfa/Cfb)
- Antalya, Turkey
- Athens, Greece (bordering on BSh)
- Barcelona, Spain (bordering on Cfa)
- Beirut, Lebanon
- Bethlehem, Palestine
- Casablanca, Morocco
- Chitral, Pakistan (bordering on BSk)
- Chico, California, United States
- Dubrovnik, Croatia
- Dushanbe, Tajikistan
- Erbil, Iraq
- Faro, Portugal
- Fez, Morocco
- Funchal, Portugal (bordering on As)
- Gibraltar
- Heraklion, Greece
- Homs, Syria
- Ilam, Ilam, Iran
- Irbid, Jordan
- Istanbul, Turkey (bordering on Cfa)
- İzmir, Turkey
- Jerusalem, Israel
- Kardzhali, Bulgaria (bordering on Cfa)
- Kermanshah, Kermanshah, Iran
- Khorramabad, Lorestan, Iran
- Latakia, Syria
- Lisbon, Portugal
- Los Angeles, California, United States (bordering on BSh)
- Marseille, France
- Maymana, Afghanistan
- Melipilla, Chile
- Menorca, Balearic Islands, Spain
- Mersin, Turkey
- Monaco
- Mosul, Iraq (bordering on BSh)
- Naples, Italy (bordering on Cfa)
- Nice, France
- Novorossiysk, Krasnodar Krai, Russia (bordering on Cfa)
- Palermo, Italy
- Patras, Greece
- Perth, Western Australia, Australia
- Podgorica, Montenegro (bordering on Cfa)
- Prodromos, Cyprus
- Provo, Utah, United States (bordering on Dsa)
- Redding, California, United States
- Rome, Italy
- Sacramento, California, United States
- Seville, Spain
- Sanandaj, Kordestan, Iran (bordering on Dsa)
- Shkodër, Albania (bordering on Cfa)
- Split, Croatia (bordering on Cfa)
- Tangier, Morocco
- Tashkent, Uzbekistan (bordering on BSk)
- Tecate, Baja California, Mexico
- Tel Aviv, Israel
- Tlemcen, Algeria
- Tunis, Tunisia
- Şanlıurfa, Turkey
- Valletta, Malta
- Vatican City
- Walla Walla, Washington, United States
- Yasuj, Kohgiluyeh and Boyer-Ahmad, Iran
- Zhetisay, Kazakhstan (bordering on Dsa and BSk)

== Csb: Warm-summer Mediterranean climate ==
- Albany, Western Australia, Australia
- Aluminé, Neuquén Province, Argentina
- Aveiro, Portugal
- Bayda, Libya
- Cape Town, South Africa (bordering on Csa)
- Concepción, Chile
- Eugene, Oregon, United States
- Guarda, Portugal
- Ibarra, Ecuador
- Ipiales, Colombia (bordering on Cfb)
- Karlskrona, Sweden (bordering on Cfb)
- Kiasar, Mazandaran, Iran (bordering on Cfb and Csa)
- Korçë, Albania (bordering on Dsb)
- Kütahya, Turkey (bordering on Dsb)
- León, Spain
- Linares, Chile
- Lonquimay, Araucanía Region, Chile (bordering on Cfb)
- Mount Gambier, South Australia, Australia
- Nakuru, Kenya
- Nanaimo, British Columbia, Canada
- Ohrid, North Macedonia
- Pasto, Colombia
- Port Lincoln, South Australia, Australia (bordering on Cfb)
- Portland, Oregon, United States (bordering on Csa)
- Porto, Portugal
- Rieti, Italy
- Salamanca, Spain
- San Carlos de Bariloche, Argentina
- San Cristóbal de la Laguna, Spain
- San Francisco, California, United States
- San Martín de los Andes, Neuquén Province, Argentina (bordering on Cfb)
- Segovia, Spain
- Seattle, Washington, United States
- Siah Bisheh, Mazandaran, Iran (bordering on Cfb)
- Sintra, Portugal
- Tulcán, Ecuador (bordering on Cfb)
- Valladolid, Spain
- Valparaíso, Chile
- Victoria, British Columbia, Canada

== Csc: Cold-summer Mediterranean climate ==
- Balmaceda, Chile (bordering on Csb)
- Liawenee, Australia (bordering on Csb/Cfb/Cfc)
- Røst, Norway (bordering on Cfc)

== Cfa: Humid subtropical climate ==
- Asadabad, Afghanistan
- Astara, Azerbaijan (bordering on Csa)
- Asunción, Paraguay
- Atlanta, Georgia, United States
- Austin, Texas, United States
- Balbalan, Philippines (bordering on Am)
- Bandar-e Anzali, Gilan, Iran
- Belgrade, Serbia (bordering on Dfa)
- Bologna, Italy
- Bratislava, Slovakia (bordering on Cfb/Dfa/Dfb)
- Brisbane, Queensland, Australia
- Budapest, Hungary (bordering on Dfa)
- Buenos Aires, Argentina
- Burgas, Bulgaria
- Chongqing, China (bordering on Cwa)
- Ciudad del Este, Paraguay
- Constanța, Romania (bordering on BSk)
- Dir, Pakistan
- Durban, KwaZulu-Natal, South Africa
- Florianópolis, Santa Catarina, Brazil
- Florina, Greece (bordering on Dfa)
- Fukuoka, Fukuoka Prefecture, Japan
- Geoje, South Korea (bordering on Cwa)
- Giresun, Turkey
- Girona, Spain (bordering on Csa)
- Gorgan, Golestan, Iran
- Gwangju, South Korea (bordering on Cwa/Dfa/Dwa)
- Hangzhou, Zhejiang, China
- Houston, Texas, United States
- Huesca, Spain
- Ijevan, Tavush, Armenia (bordering on Dfa)
- Jeju, South Korea
- Koper, Slovenia
- Kozani, Greece
- Krasnodar, Russia (bordering on Dfa)
- Kutaisi, Georgia
- La Plata, Argentina
- Lugano, Ticino, Switzerland (bordering on Cfb)
- Lyon, France (bordering on Cfb)
- Matamoros, Tamaulipas, Mexico (bordering on Aw)
- Maykop, Adygea, Russia (bordering on Dfa)
- Milan, Italy
- Montevideo, Uruguay
- Mostar, Bosnia and Herzegovina (bordering on Csa)
- Nagoya, Aichi, Japan
- Nanjing, Jiangsu, China
- New York City, New York, United States (bordering on Dfa)
- Novi Sad, Serbia (bordering on Dfa)
- Osaka, Japan
- Philadelphia, Pennsylvania, United States
- Plovdiv, Bulgaria
- Porto Alegre, Rio Grande do Sul, Brazil
- Prizren, Kosovo (bordering on Cfb/Dfa/Dfb)
- Ramsar, Mazandaran, Iran
- Rasht, Gilan, Iran
- Rijeka, Croatia
- Rosario, Argentina (bordering on Cwa)
- Samsun, Turkey
- San Marino
- Sari, Mazandaran, Iran
- São Paulo, Brazil
- Siguatepeque, Honduras (bordering on Cwa)
- Shanghai, China
- Simferopol, Ukraine (bordering on Dfa)
- Skopje, North Macedonia (bordering on Dfa and BSk)
- Sochi, Russia
- Srinagar, Jammu and Kashmir, India
- Sydney, New South Wales, Australia
- Taipei, Taiwan
- Taoyuan, Taiwan
- Tbilisi, Georgia (bordering on BSk)
- Tébessa, Algeria (bordering on Csa)
- Tirana, Albania (bordering on Csa)
- Tokyo, Japan
- Toulouse, France
- Tulcea, Romania (bordering on Dfa)
- Ulsan, South Korea
- Varna, Bulgaria
- Valence, France (bordering on Cfb)
- Venice, Italy
- Vienna, Austria (bordering on Cfb/Dfa/Dfb)
- Wagga Wagga, New South Wales, Australia
- Wuhan, Hubei, China
- Yalta, Ukraine (bordering on Csa)
- Yokohama, Kanagawa, Japan
- Zaqatala, Azerbaijan
- Zonguldak, Turkey (bordering on Cfb)

== Cfb: Oceanic climate ==
- Amsterdam, North Holland, Netherlands
- Artvin, Turkey (bordering on Cfa/Csa/Csb)
- Auckland, New Zealand
- Baltiysk, Kaliningrad Oblast, Russia (bordering on Dfb)
- Barnstable, Massachusetts, United States
- Belfast, Northern Ireland, United Kingdom
- Bergen, Vestland, Norway
- Berlin, Germany
- Bern, Switzerland (bordering on Dfb)
- Bilbao, Spain
- Block Island, Rhode Island, United States
- Bolu, Turkey
- Bordeaux, France (bordering on Cfa)
- Bornholm, Denmark
- Brussels, Belgium
- Caransebeș, Romania (bordering on Dfb)
- Cetinje, Montenegro (bordering on Dfb)
- Christchurch, New Zealand
- Copenhagen, Denmark
- Dublin, Ireland
- Edinburgh, Scotland, United Kingdom
- Forks, Washington, United States
- Frankfurt, Hesse, Germany
- Gdynia, Poland
- Geneva, Switzerland
- George, South Africa
- Gijón, Spain
- Glasgow, Scotland, United Kingdom
- Gothenburg, Sweden
- Graz, Austria (bordering on Dfb)
- Győr, Hungary (bordering on Cfa/Dfa/Dfb)
- Hobart, Tasmania, Australia
- Île d'Yeu, France
- Kaposvár, Hungary (bordering on Cfa/Dfa/Dfb)
- Ketchikan, Alaska, United States
- L'Aquila, Italy (bordering on Cfa)
- Lausanne, Switzerland
- Ljubljana, Slovenia
- Lofoten, Nordland, Norway (bordering on Cfc/Dfb/Dfc)
- London, England, United Kingdom
- Luxembourg City, Luxembourg
- Malmö, Sweden
- Mar del Plata, Argentina
- Melbourne, Victoria, Australia (bordering on Cfa)
- Merano, Italy (bordering on Cfa)
- Munich, Bavaria, Germany
- Ōma, Aomori Prefecture, Japan (bordering on Dfb)
- Ørland, Trøndelag, Norway
- Osorno, Los Lagos Region, Chile
- Paris, France
- Port Elizabeth, South Africa
- Prague, Czech Republic (bordering on Dfb)
- Prince Rupert, British Columbia, Canada
- Puerto Montt, Los Lagos Region, Chile
- Puerto Natales, Chile (bordering on Cfc)
- Punta del Este, Uruguay (bordering on Cfa)
- Salzburg, Austria (bordering on Dfb)
- Santander, Spain
- Sarajevo, Bosnia and Herzegovina (bordering on Dfb)
- Skagen, Denmark
- Szczecin, Poland
- Tropojë, Albania (bordering on Cfa)
- Vaduz, Liechtenstein
- Valdivia, Los Ríos Region, Chile
- Vancouver, British Columbia, Canada (bordering on Csb)
- Villa La Angostura, Neuquén Province, Argentina
- Wellington, New Zealand
- Wollongong, New South Wales, Australia (bordering on Cfa)
- Wrocław, Poland (bordering on Dfb)
- Yarmouth, Nova Scotia, Canada (bordering on Dfb)
- Zagreb, Croatia (bordering on Dfb)
- Zurich, Switzerland

== Cfb: Subtropical highland climate with uniform rainfall ==
- Andorra la Vella, Andorra
- Bogotá, Colombia
- Briançon, France (bordering on Dfb)
- Brinchang, Malaysia
- Cameron Highlands, Malaysia
- Canberra, Australian Capital Territory, Australia
- Chachapoyas, Peru
- Cobán, Guatemala (bordering on Cwb)
- Constanza, Dominican Republic
- Cuenca, Ecuador
- Dullstroom, South Africa
- Eldoret, Kenya
- Goris, Syunik, Armenia (bordering on Dfb)
- Kabale, Uganda
- Kodaikanal, Tamil Nadu, India
- Le Tampon, Réunion, France
- Lithgow, New South Wales, Australia
- La Esperanza, Honduras (bordering on Cwb)
- Manizales, Colombia
- Maseru, Lesotho (bordering on Cwb)
- Mthatha, South Africa
- Mucuchíes, Venezuela
- Nuwara Eliya, Sri Lanka
- Oruro, Bolivia
- Oxapampa, Peru
- Quito, Pichincha, Ecuador
- Riobamba, Ecuador (bordering on Csb)
- Sa Pa, Vietnam
- Soria, Spain
- Teresópolis, Rio de Janeiro, Brazil
- Trevico, Italy
- Tunja, Colombia
- Volcano, Hawaii, United States
- Wabag, Papua New Guinea
- Waynesville, North Carolina, United States
- Williams, Arizona, United States
- Xalapa, Veracruz, Mexico (bordering on Cfa)

== Cfc: Subpolar oceanic climate ==
- Adak, Alaska, United States (bordering on Dfc)
- Bø, Nordland, Norway (bordering on Cfb/Dfb/Dfc)
- Hafnarfjörður, Iceland (bordering on Dfc)
- Karlsøy, Norway (bordering on Dfc)
- Miena, Tasmania, Australia
- Punta Arenas, Chile
- Porvenir, Chile
- Reykjavík, Iceland
- Río Grande, Tierra del Fuego, Argentina (bordering on BSk/Dfc/ET)
- Río Turbio, Santa Cruz Province, Argentina
- Stanley, Falkland Islands
- Tórshavn, Faroe Islands
- Unalaska, Alaska, United States
- Værøy, Norway (bordering on Csc)
- Vestmannaeyjar, Iceland (bordering on ET)

== Cwa: Dry-winter humid subtropical climate ==
- Antananarivo, Madagascar (bordering on Cwb)
- Birgunj, Nepal
- Busan, South Korea (bordering on Cfa)
- Changwon, South Korea (bordering on Cfa)
- Chengdu, Sichuan, China
- Chiayi, Taiwan
- Chimoio, Mozambique
- Córdoba, Argentina
- Daegu, South Korea (bordering on Dwa)
- Delhi, India (bordering on BSh)
- Dinajpur, Bangladesh
- Guadalajara, Jalisco, Mexico
- Guangzhou, Guangdong, China (bordering on Cfa)
- Guatemala City, Guatemala (bordering on Aw)
- Guwahati, Assam, India (bordering on Aw)
- Hanoi, Vietnam
- Hong Kong
- Islamabad, Pakistan
- Kathmandu, Nepal
- León, Guanajuato, Mexico
- Lilongwe, Malawi
- Lubumbashi, Democratic Republic of Congo
- Lucknow, Uttar Pradesh, India
- Luena, Angola (bordering on Aw)
- Lusaka, Zambia
- Macau
- Mackay, Queensland, Australia (bordering on Aw)
- Ndola, Zambia
- Phonsavan, Laos
- Pokhara, Nepal
- Pretoria, Gauteng, South Africa
- Qingdao, Shandong, China (bordering on Dwa)
- Rajshahi, Bangladesh
- Rangpur, Bangladesh
- Rawalpindi, Pakistan
- Saidpur, Bangladesh
- San Luis, Argentina (bordering on BSk)
- Santa Rosa de Copan, Honduras
- Shenzhen, Guangdong, China
- Sialkot, Pakistan
- Taichung, Taiwan (bordering on Aw)
- Taunggyi, Myanmar
- Tucumán, Argentina
- Yeosu, South Korea
- Zapopan, Jalisco, Mexico
- Zhengzhou, Henan, China

== Cwb: Dry-winter subtropical highland climate ==
- Addis Ababa, Ethiopia
- Arusha, Tanzania
- Baguio, Philippines (higher elevations)
- Batu, Indonesia
- Byumba, Rwanda
- Cajamarca, Peru
- Cherrapunji, Meghalaya, India
- Cusco, Peru
- Da Lat, Vietnam
- Dali City, Yunnan, China
- Darjeeling, West Bengal, India
- Dedza, Malawi
- Diamantina, Brazil
- Fraijanes, Guatemala
- Gangtok, Sikkim, India
- Hakha, Myanmar
- Harare, Zimbabwe
- Huambo, Angola
- Huaraz, Peru
- Ixchiguán, Guatemala (bordering on Cwc)
- Jijiga, Ethiopia
- Johannesburg, South Africa
- Kenscoff, Haiti (bordering on Aw)
- Kunming, Yunnan, China
- La Paz (lower elevations), Bolivia
- La Trinidad, Philippines
- Lichinga, Mozambique
- Lukla, Nepal
- Mbabane, Eswatini
- Mbeya, Tanzania
- Mexico City, Mexico
- Mokhotlong, Lesotho
- Nairobi, Kenya
- Ndu, Cameroon
- Nyingchi, China
- Ooty, India
- Phongsali, Laos
- Puebla, Mexico
- Quetzaltenango, Guatemala
- Qujing, Yunnan, China (bordering on Cfb)
- Salta, Argentina
- Shimla, Himachal Pradesh, India
- Sucre, Bolivia
- Thimphu, Bhutan (bordering on Cwa)
- Toluca, Mexico

== Cwc: Dry-winter cold subtropical highland climate ==
- El Alto, Bolivia (bordering on ET)
- Juliaca, Peru (bordering on ET and Cwb)
- La Paz (high elevations), Bolivia (bordering on ET)
- Potosí, Bolivia (bordering on ET and Cwb)

== Dfa/Dwa/Dsa: Hot-summer humid continental climate ==
=== Dfa climate ===
- Aktobe, Kazakhstan
- Almaty, Kazakhstan
- Aomori, Japan (bordering on Cfa)
- Boston, Massachusetts, United States (bordering on Cfa)
- Bucharest, Romania (bordering on Cfa)
- Çankırı, Turkey (bordering on Cfa and BSk)
- Cheonan, South Korea (bordering on Dwa)
- Chicago, Illinois, United States
- Chișinău, Moldova
- Columbus, Ohio, United States (bordering on Cfa)
- Detroit, Michigan, United States
- Dnipro, Ukraine (bordering on Dfb)
- Donetsk, Ukraine
- Hakodate, Hokkaido, Japan (bordering on Dfb)
- Hamilton, Ontario, Canada (bordering on Dfb)
- Iași, Romania (bordering on Dfb)
- Kimchaek, North Korea (bordering on Dwa)
- Minneapolis, Minnesota, United States
- Nagano, Nagano Prefecture, Japan (bordering on Cfa)
- Odesa, Ukraine (bordering on Cfa and BSk)
- Oral, Kazakhstan (bordering on BSk)
- Pleven, Bulgaria
- Pogradec, Albania (bordering on Cfa/Cfb/Dfb)
- Qabala, Azerbaijan (bordering on Cfa/Cfb/Dfb)
- Rostov-on-Don, Russia
- Ruse, Bulgaria (bordering on Cfa)
- Sapporo, Hokkaido, Japan (bordering on Dfb)
- Saratov, Russia
- Szeged, Hungary (bordering on Cfa)
- Tanchon, North Korea (bordering on Dfb/Dwa/Dwb)
- Toronto, Ontario, Canada (bordering on Dfb)
- Ürümqi, Xinjiang, China (bordering on BSk)
- Volgograd, Russia (bordering on BSk)
- Windsor, Ontario, Canada
- Zaječar, Serbia (bordering on Cfa)

=== Dwa climate ===
- Beijing, China (bordering on BSk)
- Blagoveshchensk, Amur Oblast, Russia (bordering on Dwb)
- Chongjin, North Korea
- Chuncheon, Gangwon Province, South Korea
- Daejeon, South Korea (bordering on Cwa)
- Harbin, Heilongjiang, China
- Incheon, South Korea
- Kaesong, North Korea
- Lesozavodsk, Primorsky Krai, Russia (bordering on Dwb)
- North Platte, Nebraska, United States (bordering on Dfa and BSk)
- Pyongyang, North Korea
- Rapid City, South Dakota, United States (bordering on BSk)
- Seoul, South Korea
- Shenyang, Liaoning, China
- Valentine, Nebraska, United States
- Xi'an, Shaanxi, China (bordering on Cwa)

=== Dsa climate ===
- Arak, Markazi, Iran (bordering on BSk and Csa)
- Arys, Kazakhstan (bordering on BSk)
- Bishkek, Kyrgyzstan
- Bitlis, Turkey
- Cambridge, Idaho, United States
- Chirchiq, Uzbekistan (bordering on Csa)
- Fayzabad, Badakhshan, Afghanistan (bordering on Csa)
- Ghazni, Afghanistan
- Hakkâri, Turkey
- Hamadan, Hamadan, Iran (bordering on BSk)
- Isfara, Tajikistan
- Konibodom, Tajikistan (bordering on Csa)
- Logan, Utah, United States
- Lytton, British Columbia, Canada (bordering on Csa)
- Muş, Turkey
- Osh, Kyrgyzstan
- Salt Lake City, Utah, United States (bordering on Csa)
- Saqqez, Kordestan, Iran
- Setif, Algeria
- Shamakhi, Azerbaijan (bordering on Csa)
- Shymkent, Kazakhstan (bordering on Csa)
- Tabriz, East Azerbaijan, Iran (bordering on BSk)
- Urmia, West Azerbaijan, Iran (bordering on BSk)

== Dfb/Dwb/Dsb: Warm-summer humid continental/hemiboreal climate ==
=== Dfb climate ===
- Aetomilitsa, Greece (bordering on Cfb)
- Akhaltsikhe, Georgia
- Ardahan, Turkey
- Asahikawa, Hokkaido, Japan
- Astana, Kazakhstan
- Augsburg, Bavaria, Germany (bordering on Cfb)
- Belluno, Italy (bordering on Cfb)
- Bismarck, North Dakota, United States (bordering on Dfa)
- Bitola, North Macedonia (bordering on Dfa)
- Briceni, Moldova
- Brno, Czech Republic
- Chamonix, France
- Cluj-Napoca, Romania
- Cortina d'Ampezzo, Italy
- Debrecen, Hungary (bordering on Cfa/Cfb/Dfa)
- Edmonton, Alberta, Canada
- El Pas de la Casa, Andorra (bordering on Dfc)
- Erzurum, Turkey
- Fairbanks, Alaska, United States (bordering on Dfc)
- Falun, Dalarna, Sweden
- Görlitz, Saxony, Germany (bordering on Cfb)
- Gospić, Croatia (bordering on Cfb)
- Gyumri, Shirak, Armenia
- Helsinki, Finland
- Imilchil, Morocco (bordering on Cfb)
- Innsbruck, Austria
- Karaganda, Kazakhstan
- Karakol, Kyrgyzstan
- Kars, Turkey
- Kharkiv, Ukraine (bordering on Dfa)
- Klaipėda, Lithuania (bordering on Cfb)
- Klagenfurt am Wörthersee, Austria
- Košice, Slovakia
- Kraków, Poland
- Kushiro, Hokkaido, Japan
- Kyiv, Ukraine
- La Brévine, Switzerland (bordering on Dfc)
- La Chaux-de-Fonds, Switzerland
- Lendava, Slovenia (bordering on Cfb)
- Lillehammer, Norway (bordering on Dfc)
- Livno, Bosnia and Herzegovina (bordering on Cfb)
- Lviv, Ukraine
- Marquette, Michigan, United States
- Miercurea Ciuc, Romania
- Minsk, Belarus
- Montreal, Quebec, Canada (bordering on Dfa)
- Moscow, Russia
- Mount Buller, Victoria, Australia (bordering on Cfb/Cfc/Dfc)
- Mouthe, France
- Mutsu, Aomori Prefecture, Japan (bordering on Cfb)
- Novosibirsk, Russia
- Oslo, Norway
- Ottawa, Ontario, Canada
- Pavlodar, Kazakhstan (bordering on Dfa)
- Pljevlja, Montenegro
- Portland, Maine, United States
- Poznań, Poland (bordering on Cfb)
- Pristina, Kosovo
- Regensburg, Bavaria, Germany (bordering on Cfb)
- Riga, Latvia
- Saint Petersburg, Russia
- Saint-Véran, France (bordering on Dfc)
- Samara, Russia (bordering on Dfa)
- Schaan, Liechtenstein (bordering on Cfb)
- Sofia, Bulgaria (bordering on Cfa/Cfb/Dfa)
- Stockholm, Sweden
- Subotica, Serbia (bordering on BSk)
- Szombathely, Hungary (bordering on Cfb)
- Tallinn, Estonia
- Tampere, Finland (bordering on Dfc)
- Tekes County, Xinjiang, China (bordering on BSk and Dwb)
- Toblach, Italy
- Trondheim, Norway
- Turku, Finland
- Uppsala, Sweden
- Vanadzor, Armenia
- Vilnius, Lithuania
- Warsaw, Poland (bordering on Cfb)
- Winnipeg, Manitoba, Canada
- Worthington, Massachusetts, United States
- Žabljak, Montenegro

=== Dwb climate ===
- Baruunturuun, Mongolia (bordering on Dwc)
- Calgary, Alberta, Canada (bordering on BSk)
- Darkhan, Mongolia (bordering on BSk)
- Harrison, Nebraska, United States (bordering on Dfb)
- Heihe, Heilongjiang, China
- Hoeryong, North Korea
- Hyesan, North Korea
- Irkutsk, Russia (bordering on Dwc)
- Khabarovsk, Russia (bordering on Dwa)
- Kharkhorin, Mongolia
- Pembina, North Dakota, United States (bordering on Dfb)
- Pyeongchang, South Korea
- Rason, North Korea
- Shigatse, Tibet, China
- Thief River Falls, Minnesota, United States
- Vladivostok, Primorsky Krai, Russia
- Yanji, Jilin, China (bordering on Dwa)

=== Dsb climate ===
- Abali, Tehran, Iran
- Ağrı, Turkey
- Alto Río Senguer, Chubut Province, Argentina (bordering on BSk/Csb/Csc/Dsc)
- Ardabil, Ardabil, Iran (bordering on BSk)
- Castlegar, British Columbia, Canada (bordering on Dfb)
- Chaghcharan, Ghor, Afghanistan
- Dras, Ladakh, India
- Flagstaff, Arizona, United States (bordering on Csb)
- Jermuk, Vyots Dzor, Armenia (bordering on Dfb)
- Linguaglossa, Sicily, Italy (bordering on Csb)
- Rocca di Mezzo, Italy (bordering on Csb and Cfb)
- Roghun, Tajikistan
- Sivas, Turkey
- Smolyan, Bulgaria
- South Lake Tahoe, California, United States (bordering on Csb)
- Spokane, Washington, United States (bordering on Csa/Csb/Dsa)

== Dfc/Dwc/Dsc: Subarctic/boreal climate ==
=== Dfc climate ===
- Akranes, Iceland (bordering on Cfc)
- Alta, Norway
- Arkhangelsk, Russia
- Bethel, Alaska, United States
- Davos, Switzerland
- Feldberg, Baden-Württemberg, Germany
- Fort McMurray, Alberta, Canada (bordering on Dfb)
- Fraser, Colorado, United States
- Hikkim, Himachel Pradesh, India
- Horská Kvilda, Czech Republic
- Jyväskylä, Finland
- Kangerlussuaq, Greenland, Denmark (bordering on ET and BSk)
- Kiruna, Sweden
- Kotlas, Russia
- Labrador City, Newfoundland and Labrador, Canada
- Livigno, Italy
- Luleå, Sweden
- Narsarsuaq, Greenland, Denmark (bordering on ET)
- Naryan-Mar, Russia
- Nome, Alaska, United States
- Norilsk, Krasnoyarsk Krai, Russia
- Obergurgl, Austria
- Oulu, Finland (bordering on Dfb)
- Petropavlovsk-Kamchatsky, Kamchatka Krai, Russia (bordering on Dfb)
- Røros, Norway
- Saint Pierre and Miquelon, France (bordering on Dfb)
- Sauðárkrókur, Iceland (bordering on ET)
- St. Moritz, Grisons, Switzerland
- Tignes, France
- Tromsø, Norway
- Umeå, Sweden (bordering on Dfb)
- Vaasa, Finland
- Whitehorse, Yukon, Canada
- Yakutsk, Sakha Republic, Russia (bordering on Dfd)
- Yellowknife, Northwest Territories, Canada
- Zermatt, Switzerland

=== Dwc climate ===
- Bulgan, Mongolia (bordering on Dwb)
- Delta Junction, Alaska, United States (bordering on BSk)
- Mohe, Heilongjiang, China
- Nagqu, Tibet, China (bordering on ET and BSk)
- Okhotsk, Khabarovsk Krai, Russia
- Samjiyon, North Korea (bordering on Dwb)
- Susuman, Magadan Oblast, Russia (bordering on Dwd)
- Tsetserleg, Arkhangai Province, Mongolia (bordering on Dwb)
- Usolye-Sibirskoye, Irkutsk Oblast, Russia
- Yushu City, Qinghai, China (bordering on Dwb)

=== Dsc climate ===
- Akureyri, Iceland (bordering on Csc)
- Anadyr, Chukotka, Russia
- Anchorage, Alaska, United States (bordering on Dsb)
- Atlin, British Columbia, Canada
- Brian Head, Utah, United States
- Bodie, California, United States (bordering on Dsb)
- Dawson City, Yukon, Canada
- Kenai, Alaska, United States
- Nyurba, Sakha Republic, Russia (bordering on Dfc)
- Seymchan, Magadan Oblast, Russia (bordering on Dsd/Dfd/Dfc)
- Skjåk, Norway (bordering on BSk)
- Soldotna, Alaska, United States

== Dfd/Dwd/Dsd: Subarctic/boreal climate with severe winters ==
=== Dfd climate ===
- Okhotsky-Perevoz, Sakha Republic, Russia
- Oymyakon, Sakha Republic, Russia (bordering on Dwd)
- Udachny, Sakha Republic, Russia (bordering on Dfc)

=== Dwd climate ===
- Allakh-Yun, Sakha Republic, Russia
- Delyankir, Sakha Republic, Russia
- Khonuu, Sakha Republic, Russia (bordering on Dfd)

=== Dsd climate ===
- Verkhoyansk, Sakha Republic, Russia (bordering on Dfd)

== ET: Tundra climate ==
- Alert, Nunavut, Canada (bordering on EF)
- Amdo, Tibet, China
- Apartaderos, Venezuela
- Bernardo O'Higgins Base, Antarctica (bordering on EF)
- Cerro de Pasco, Peru
- Davis Station, Antarctica
- Dikson, Krasnoyarsk Krai, Russia
- Dingboche, Nepal
- El Aguilar, Argentina
- El Alto, Bolivia
- Esperanza Base, Antarctica
- Finse, Norway
- Grytviken, South Georgia, United Kingdom
- Ilulissat, Greenland, Denmark
- Iqaluit, Nunavut, Canada
- Ísafjörður, Iceland (bordering on Csc)
- Ittoqqortoormiit, Greenland, Denmark
- Juf, Switzerland
- La Rinconada, Peru
- Longyearbyen, Svalbard, Norway
- Möðrudalur, Iceland
- Murghob, Tajikistan
- Mykines, Faroe Islands (bordering on Cfc)
- Mys Shmidta, Chukotka, Russia
- North Salang, Afghanistan (bordering on Dsc)
- Nuuk, Greenland, Denmark
- Ny-Ålesund, Svalbard, Norway
- Palmer Station, Antarctica
- Parinacota, Chile
- Phari, China
- Port-aux-Français, France
- Puerto Williams, Chile (bordering on Cfc)
- Putre, Chile (bordering on Cwc and BSk)
- Qaanaaq, Greenland
- Qarabolaq, Afghanistan
- Sachs Harbour, Northwest Territories, Canada
- Shimshal, Pakistan
- St. Paul, Alaska, United States (bordering on Dfc)
- Tanggulashan, Qinghai, China
- Tiksi, Sakha Republic, Russia
- Tolhuin, Tierra del Fuego, Argentina (bordering on Dfc)
- Trepalle, Italy
- Ushuaia, Tierra del Fuego, Argentina (bordering on Cfc)
- Utqiagvik, Alaska, United States
- Vetas, Colombia
- Wainwright, Alaska, United States

== EF: Ice cap climate ==
- Amundsen–Scott Station, Antarctica
- Casey Station, Antarctica (bordering on ET)
- Concordia Station, Antarctica
- Marambio Base, Antarctica (bordering on ET)
- McMurdo Station, Antarctica
- Summit Camp, Greenland, Denmark

== See also ==
- List of cities with a continental climate, alphabetically sorted by location
- List of locations with an alpine climate
- List of locations with a subtropical climate
