= Qarabolaq =

Qarabolaq قره‌بلاق
- Location in Afghanistan
- Coordinates: 37°25′N 73°46′E
- Country: Afghanistan
- Province: Badakhshan
- District: Wakhan
- Elevation: 13,579 ft (4,139 m)
- Time zone: + 4.30

Qarabolaq or Qareh Bulaq (Pashto: قره‌بلاق) is a small settlement in the Great Pamir in Wakhan District, Badakhshan Province, northeastern Afghanistan. It lies at an altitude of 4,139 m on the eastern shore of Zorkul lake, near the Afghan border with Tajikistan but also close to the Afghan borders with Pakistan and China.

== Climate ==
Qarabolaq has an alpine tundra climate (Köppen: ET). It has brief, cool summers and long, frigid winters. With an annual mean of −7.8 °C (18.0 °F), Qarabolaq lies in the continuous permafrost zone.

Climate data for Qarabolaq (2009-2022)
Month	Jan	Feb	Mar	Apr	May	Jun	Jul	Aug	Sep	Oct	Nov	Dec	Year
Record high °C (°F)	−5 (23)	−2 (28)	3 (37)	7 (45)	11 (52)	17 (63)	22 (72)	19 (66)	17 (63)	11 (52)	2 (36)	−2 (28)	22 (72)
Mean daily maximum °C (°F)	−15.1 (4.8)	−12.2 (10.0)	−7.2 (19.0)	−2.9 (26.8)	2.3 (36.1)	7.2 (45.0)	12.7 (54.9)	12.2 (54.0)	7.7 (45.9)	0.0 (32.0)	−8.0 (17.6)	−13.0 (8.6)	−1.4 (29.6)
Daily mean °C (°F)	−23.2 (−9.8)	−20.2 (−4.4)	−15.1 (4.8)	−10.4 (13.3)	−3.9 (25.0)	2.2 (36.0)	8.2 (46.8)	7.4 (45.3)	2.7 (36.9)	−5.1 (22.8)	−15.2 (4.6)	−21.1 (−6.0)	−7.8 (17.9)
Mean daily minimum °C (°F)	−31.3 (−24.3)	−28.2 (−18.8)	−22.9 (−9.2)	−17.8 (0.0)	−10.0 (14.0)	−2.8 (27.0)	3.8 (38.8)	2.7 (36.9)	−2.3 (27.9)	−10.2 (13.6)	−22.3 (−8.1)	−29.1 (−20.4)	−14.2 (6.5)
Record low °C (°F)	−48 (−54)	−46 (−51)	−41 (−42)	−39 (−38)	−26 (−15)	−18 (0)	−10 (14)	−7 (19)	−14 (7)	−30 (−22)	−36 (−33)	−44 (−47)	−48 (−54)
Average precipitation mm (inches)	55.0 (2.17)	78.8 (3.10)	85.5 (3.37)	78.7 (3.10)	52.7 (2.07)	27.0 (1.06)	23.5 (0.93)	24.8 (0.98)	18.7 (0.74)	35.2 (1.39)	51.6 (2.03)	43.7 (1.72)	575.2 (22.66)
Average snowfall cm (inches)	49.8 (19.6)	69.6 (27.4)	77.4 (30.5)	71.0 (28.0)	42.0 (16.5)	17.6 (6.9)	2.7 (1.1)	7.1 (2.8)	11.2 (4.4)	32.6 (12.8)	49.9 (19.6)	40.7 (16.0)	471.6 (185.6)
Source: World Weather Online

== See also ==
- Badakhshan Province
