= El Aguilar =

- Municipality and town
- Location within Argentina
- Coordinates: 23°13′03″S 65°40′47″W
- Country: Argentina
- Province: Jujuy Province
- Elevation: 3,980 m (13,060 ft)

Population (2001)
  - Total: 3,655
- Time zone: UTC−3 (ART)
- Area code: 03887

El Aguilar is a company mining town and municipality in Jujuy Province in Argentina. At 3,980 metres (13,060 ft), it is one of the highest settlements in the country after Mina Pirquitas which is at 4,160 metres (13,650 ft). It has 3655 inhabitants (2001 census).

== Climate ==
El Aguilar has an alpine climate (Köppen ET) with two distinct seasons. There is a relatively mild wet season from December to March and a dry season with frigid mornings from April to November.

Climate data for El Aguilar (1969-1988)
Month	Jan	Feb	Mar	Apr	May	Jun	Jul	Aug	Sep	Oct	Nov	Dec	Year
Daily mean °C (°F)	6.1 (43.0)	6.3 (43.3)	5.9 (42.6)	3.9 (39.0)	0.7 (33.3)	−0.8 (30.6)	−1.5 (29.3)	0.5 (32.9)	2.0 (35.6)	3.9 (39.0)	5.3 (41.5)	5.8 (42.4)	3.2 (37.8)
Average precipitation mm (inches)	106 (4.2)	96 (3.8)	53 (2.1)	5 (0.2)	1 (0.0)	1 (0.0)	0 (0)	1 (0.0)	2 (0.1)	9 (0.4)	24 (0.9)	66 (2.6)	364 (14.3)
Source: Instituto Nacional de Tecnología Agropecuaria
