= Köppen climate classification =

Climate classification system

The Köppen climate classification divides Earth's climates into five main climate groups, with each group being divided based on patterns of seasonal precipitation and temperature. The five main groups are A (tropical), B (arid), C (temperate), D (continental), and E (polar). Each group and subgroup is represented by a letter. All climates are assigned a main group (the first letter). All climates except for those in the E group are assigned a seasonal precipitation subgroup (the second letter). For example, Af indicates a tropical rainforest climate. The system assigns a temperature subgroup for all groups other than those in the A group, indicated by the third letter for climates in B, C, D, and the second letter for climates in E. Other examples include: Cfb indicating an oceanic climate with warm summers as indicated by the ending b, while Dwb indicates a semi-monsoonal continental climate, also with warm summers. Climates are classified based on specific criteria unique to each climate type.

The Köppen climate classification is the most widely used climate classification scheme. It was first published by German-Russian climatologist Wladimir Köppen (1846–1940) in 1884, with several later modifications by Köppen, notably in 1918 and 1936. Later, German climatologist Rudolf Geiger (1894–1981) introduced some changes to the classification system in 1954 and 1961, which is thus sometimes called the Köppen–Geiger climate classification.

As Köppen designed the system based on his experience as a botanist, his main climate groups represent a classification by vegetation type. In addition to identifying climates, the system can be used to analyze ecosystem conditions and identify the main types of vegetation within climates. Due to its association with the plant life of a given region, the system is useful in predicting future changes of plant life within that region.

The Köppen climate classification system was modified further within the Trewartha climate classification system in 1966 (revised in 1980). The Trewartha system sought to create a more refined middle latitude climate zone, which was one of the criticisms of the Köppen system (the climate group C was too general).

Köppen–Geiger climate map 1991–2020: Af Am Aw As / BWh BWk BSh BSk / Csa Csb Csc / Cwa Cwb Cwc / Cfa Cfb Cfc / Dsa Dsb Dsc Dsd / Dwa Dwb Dwc Dwd / Dfa Dfb Dfc Dfd / ET EF

== Overview ==
Köppen climate classification scheme symbols description table
1st	2nd	3rd
A (Tropical)	f (Rainforest); m (Monsoon); w (Savanna, dry winter); s (Savanna, dry summer)	
B (Dry)	W (Arid desert); S (Semi-arid steppe)	h (Hot); k (Cold)
C (Temperate)	w (Dry winter); f (No dry season); s (Dry summer)	a (Hot summer); b (Warm summer); c (Cold summer)
D (Continental)	w (Dry winter); f (No dry season); s (Dry summer)	a (Hot summer); b (Warm summer); c (Cold summer); d (Very cold winter)
E (Polar)	T (Tundra); F (Ice cap)	

The Köppen climate classification scheme divides climates into five main climate groups: A (tropical), B (arid), C (temperate), D (continental), and E (polar). The second letter indicates the seasonal precipitation type, while the third letter indicates the level of heat. Summers are defined as the six-month period that is warmer either from April to September or October to March, while winter is the six-month period that is cooler.

=== Group A: Tropical climates ===
Tropical climates have an average temperature of 18 °C (64.4 °F) or higher every month of the year, with significant precipitation.

- Af = Tropical rainforest climate; average precipitation of at least 60 mm (2.4 in) in every month.
- Am = Tropical monsoon climate; driest month (which nearly always occurs at or soon after the "winter" solstice for that side of the equator) with precipitation less than 60 mm (2.4 in), but at least $100-\left ( \frac{\mathrm{total\,annual\,precipitation\,(mm)}}{25} \right )$.
- Aw or As = Tropical wet and dry or savanna climate; with the driest month having precipitation less than 60 mm (2.4 in) and less than $100-\left ( \frac{\mathrm{total\,annual\,precipitation\,(mm)}}{25} \right )$.

=== Group B: Desert and semi-arid climates ===
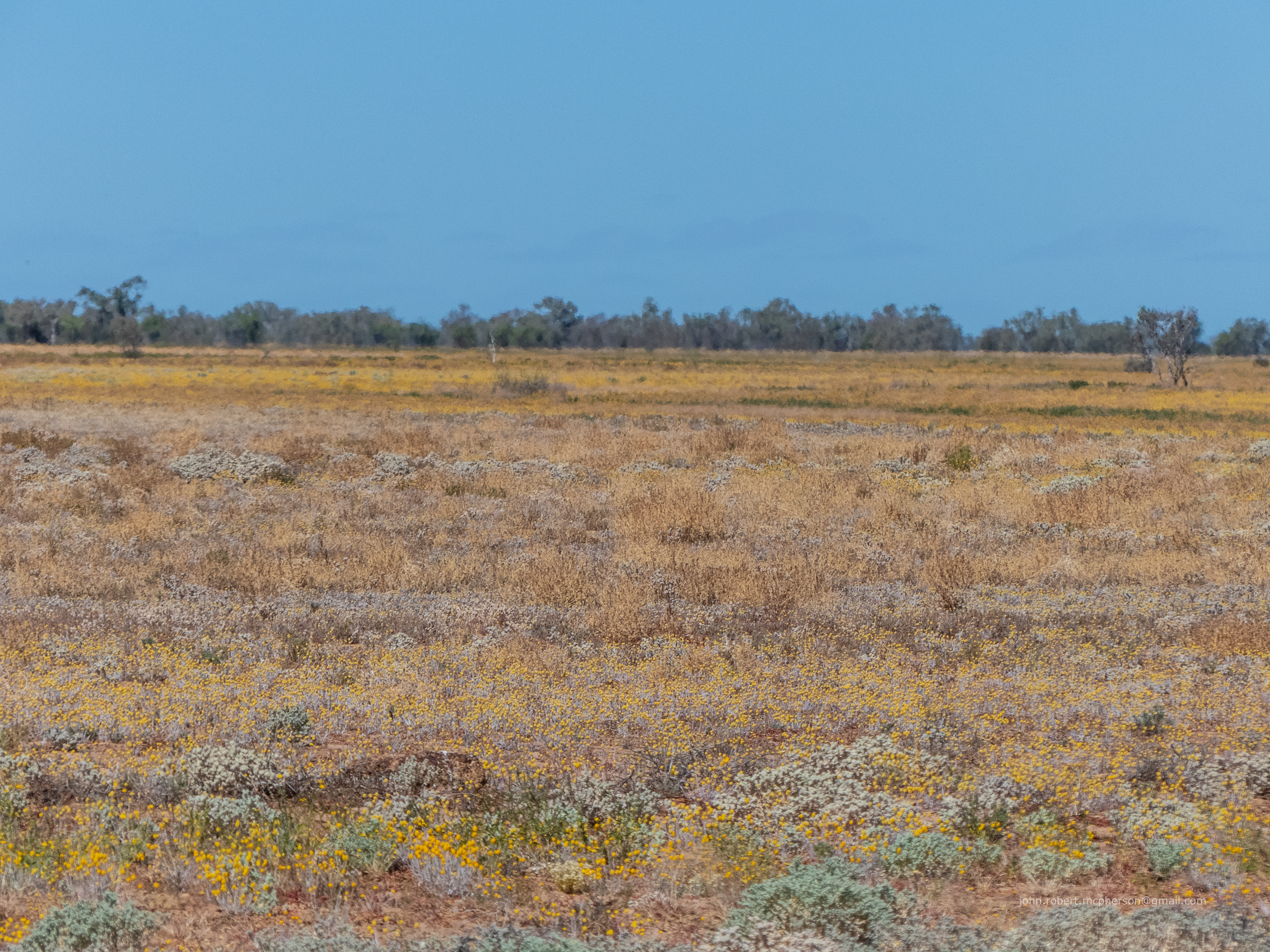
Semi-arid grassland, Queensland, Australia

Desert and semi-arid climates are defined by low precipitation in regions that do not fit the polar (EF or ET) criterion of having no month with an average temperature greater than 10 °C (50 °F).

The precipitation threshold in millimeters is determined by multiplying the average annual temperature in Celsius by 20, then adding:

1. 280 if 70% or more of the total precipitation is in the spring and summer months (April–September in the Northern Hemisphere, or October–March in the Southern), or
2. 140 if 30%–70% of the total precipitation is received during the spring and summer, or
3. 0 if less than 30% of the total precipitation is received during the spring and summer.

If the annual precipitation is less than 50% of this threshold, the classification is BW (arid: desert climate); if it is in the range of 50%–100% of the threshold, the classification is BS (semi-arid: steppe climate).

A third letter can be included to indicate temperature. Here, h signifies low-latitude climates (average annual temperature above 18 °C (64.4 °F)) while k signifies middle-latitude climates (average annual temperature less than 18 °C). In addition, n is used to denote a climate characterized by frequent fog and H for high altitudes.

- BWh = Hot desert climate
- BWk = Cold desert climate
- BSh = Hot semi-arid climate
- BSk = Cold semi-arid climate

=== Group C: Temperate climates ===
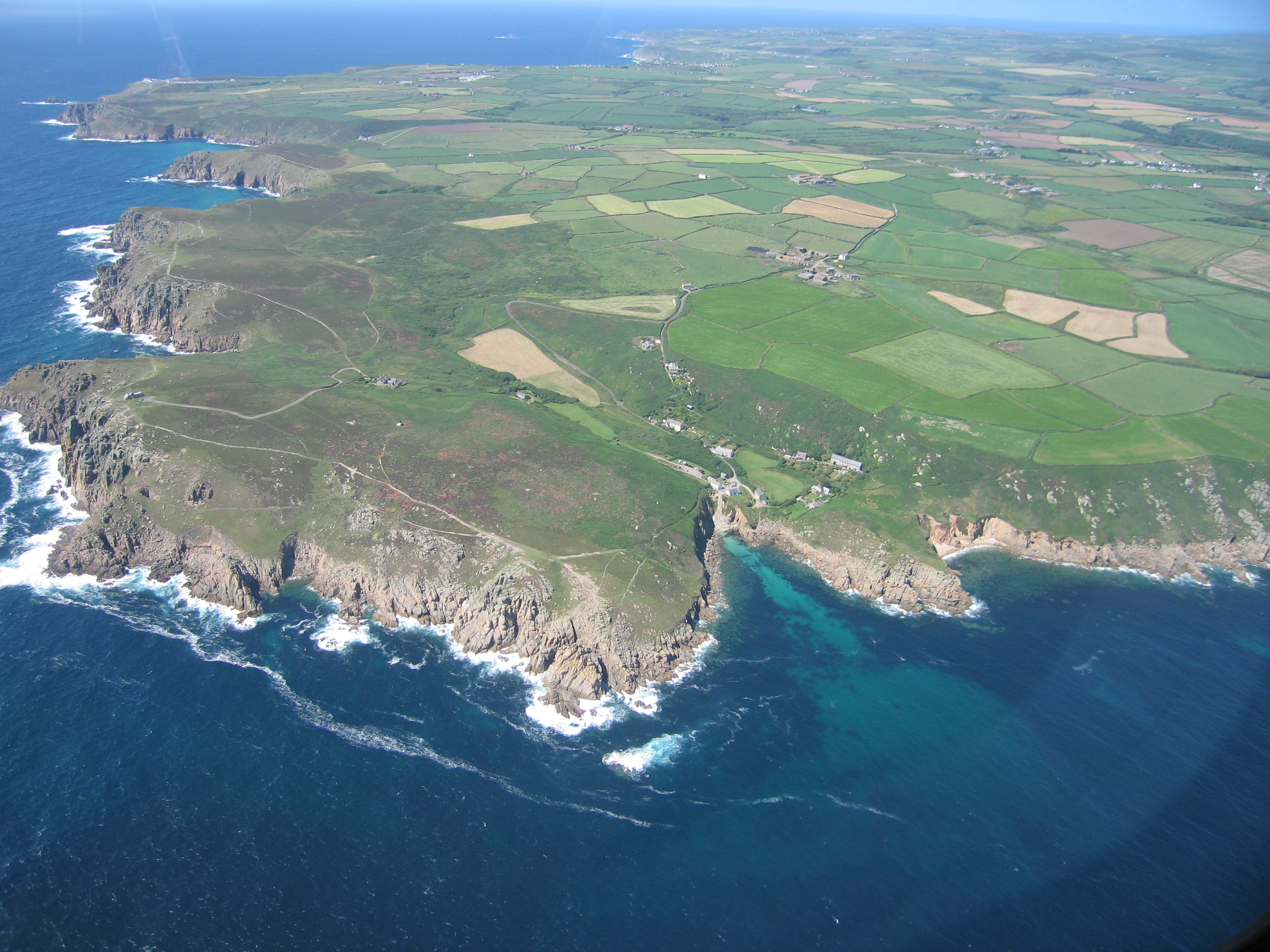
Cornwall, England, has a temperate oceanic climate

Temperate climates have the coldest month averaging between 0 °C (32 °F) (or −3 °C (26.6 °F)) and 18 °C (64.4 °F) and at least one month averaging above 10 °C (50 °F). For the distribution of precipitation in locations that both satisfy a dry summer (Cs) and a dry winter (Cw), a location is considered to have a wet summer (Cw) when more precipitation falls within the summer months than the winter months while a location is considered to have a dry summer (Cs) when more precipitation falls within the winter months. This additional criterion also applies to locations that satisfy both Ds and Dw.

- Cfa = Humid subtropical climate; coldest month averaging above 0 °C (32 °F) (or −3 °C (26.6 °F)), at least one month's average temperature above 22 °C (71.6 °F), and at least four months averaging above 10 °C (50 °F). No significant precipitation difference between seasons (neither the abovementioned set of conditions fulfilled).
- Cfb = Temperate oceanic climate or subtropical highland climate; coldest month averaging above 0 °C (32 °F) (or −3 °C (26.6 °F)), all months with average temperatures below 22 °C (71.6 °F), and at least four months averaging above 10 °C (50 °F). No significant precipitation difference between seasons (neither the abovementioned set of conditions fulfilled).
- Cfc = Subpolar oceanic climate; coldest month averaging above 0 °C (32 °F) (or −3 °C (26.6 °F)) and 1–3 months averaging above 10 °C (50 °F). No significant precipitation difference between seasons (neither the abovementioned set of conditions fulfilled).
- Cwa = Monsoon-influenced humid subtropical climate; coldest month averaging above 0 °C (32 °F) (or −3 °C (26.6 °F)), at least one month's average temperature above 22 °C (71.6 °F), and at least four months averaging above 10 °C (50 °F). At least ten times as much rain in the wettest month of summer as in the driest month of winter.
- Cwb = Subtropical highland climate or Monsoon-influenced temperate oceanic climate; coldest month averaging above 0 °C (32 °F) (or −3 °C (26.6 °F)), all months with average temperatures below 22 °C (71.6 °F), and at least four months averaging above 10 °C (50 °F). At least ten times as much rain in the wettest month of summer as in the driest month of winter.
- Cwc = Cold subtropical highland climate or Monsoon-influenced subpolar oceanic climate; coldest month averaging above 0 °C (32 °F) (or −3 °C (26.6 °F)) and 1–3 months averaging above 10 °C (50 °F). At least ten times as much rain in the wettest month of summer as in the driest month of winter.
- Csa = Hot-summer Mediterranean climate; coldest month averaging above 0 °C (32 °F) (or −3 °C (26.6 °F)), at least one month's average temperature above 22 °C (71.6 °F), and at least four months averaging above 10 °C (50 °F). At least three times as much precipitation in the wettest month of winter as in the driest month of summer, and the driest month of summer receives less than 40 mm (1.6 in).
- Csb = Warm-summer Mediterranean climate; coldest month averaging above 0 °C (32 °F) (or −3 °C (26.6 °F)), all months with average temperatures below 22 °C (71.6 °F), and at least four months averaging above 10 °C (50 °F). At least three times as much precipitation in the wettest month of winter as in the driest month of summer, and the driest month of summer receives less than 40 mm (1.6 in).
- Csc = Cold-summer Mediterranean climate; coldest month averaging above 0 °C (32 °F) (or −3 °C (26.6 °F)) and 1–3 months averaging above 10 °C (50 °F). At least three times as much precipitation in the wettest month of winter as in the driest month of summer, and the driest month of summer receives less than 40 mm (1.6 in).

=== Group D: Continental climates ===
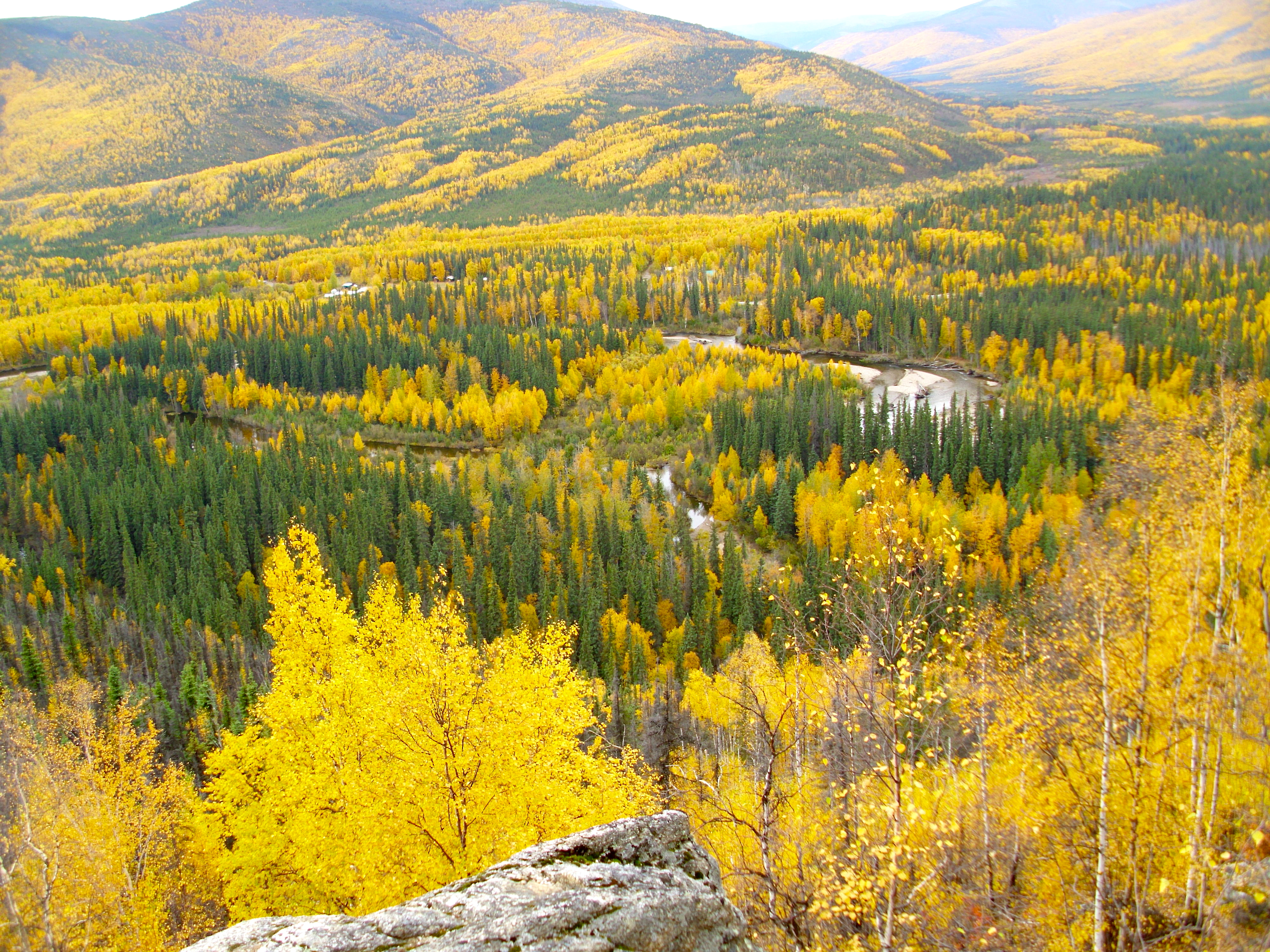
Boreal forest in Alaska has a subarctic climate

Continental climates have at least one month averaging below 0 °C (32 °F) (or −3 °C (26.6 °F)) and at least one month averaging above 10 °C (50 °F).

- Dfa = Hot-summer humid continental climate; coldest month averaging below 0 °C (32 °F) (or −3 °C (26.6 °F)), at least one month's average temperature above 22 °C (71.6 °F), and at least four months averaging above 10 °C (50 °F). No significant precipitation difference between seasons (neither the abovementioned set of conditions fulfilled).
- Dfb = Warm-summer humid continental climate; coldest month averaging below 0 °C (32 °F) (or −3 °C (26.6 °F)), all months with average temperatures below 22 °C (71.6 °F), and at least four months averaging above 10 °C (50 °F). No significant precipitation difference between seasons (neither the abovementioned set of conditions fulfilled).
- Dfc = Subarctic climate; coldest month averaging below 0 °C (32 °F) (or −3 °C (26.6 °F)) and 1–3 months averaging above 10 °C (50 °F). No significant precipitation difference between seasons (neither the abovementioned set of conditions fulfilled).
- Dfd = Extremely cold subarctic climate; coldest month averaging below −38 °C (−36.4 °F) and 1–3 months averaging above 10 °C (50 °F). No significant precipitation difference between seasons (neither the abovementioned set of conditions fulfilled).
- Dwa = Monsoon-influenced hot-summer humid continental climate; coldest month averaging below 0 °C (32 °F) (or −3 °C (26.6 °F)), at least one month's average temperature above 22 °C (71.6 °F), and at least four months averaging above 10 °C (50 °F). At least ten times as much rain in the wettest month of summer as in the driest month of winter.
- Dwb = Monsoon-influenced warm-summer humid continental climate; coldest month averaging below 0 °C (32 °F) (or −3 °C (26.6 °F)), all months with average temperatures below 22 °C (71.6 °F), and at least four months averaging above 10 °C (50 °F). At least ten times as much rain in the wettest month of summer as in the driest month of winter.
- Dwc = Monsoon-influenced subarctic climate; coldest month averaging below 0 °C (32 °F) (or −3 °C (26.6 °F)) and 1–3 months averaging above 10 °C (50 °F). At least ten times as much rain in the wettest month of summer as in the driest month of winter.
- Dwd = Monsoon-influenced extremely cold subarctic climate; coldest month averaging below −38 °C (−36.4 °F) and 1–3 months averaging above 10 °C (50 °F). At least ten times as much rain in the wettest month of summer as in the driest month of winter.
- Dsa = Mediterranean-influenced hot-summer humid continental climate; coldest month averaging below 0 °C (32 °F) (or −3 °C (26.6 °F)), average temperature of the warmest month above 22 °C (71.6 °F) and at least four months averaging above 10 °C (50 °F). At least three times as much precipitation in the wettest month of winter as in the driest month of summer, and the driest month of summer receives less than 40 mm (1.6 in).
- Dsb = Mediterranean-influenced warm-summer humid continental climate; coldest month averaging below 0 °C (32 °F) (or −3 °C (26.6 °F)), average temperature of the warmest month below 22 °C (71.6 °F) and at least four months averaging above 10 °C (50 °F). At least three times as much precipitation in the wettest month of winter as in the driest month of summer, and the driest month of summer receives less than 40 mm (1.6 in).
- Dsc = Mediterranean-influenced subarctic climate; coldest month averaging below 0 °C (32 °F) (or −3 °C (26.6 °F)) and 1–3 months averaging above 10 °C (50 °F). At least three times as much precipitation in the wettest month of winter as in the driest month of summer, and the driest month of summer receives less than 40 mm (1.6 in).
- Dsd = Mediterranean-influenced extremely cold subarctic climate; coldest month averaging below −38 °C (−36.4 °F) and 1–3 months averaging above 10 °C (50 °F). At least three times as much precipitation in the wettest month of winter as in the driest month of summer, and the driest month of summer receives less than 40 mm (1.6 in).

=== Group E: Polar and alpine climates ===
Polar and alpine climates have average temperatures below 10 °C (50 °F) in every month of the year.

- ET = Tundra climate; average temperature of warmest month between 0 °C (32 °F) and 10 °C (50 °F).
- EF = Ice cap climate; eternal winter, with all 12 months of the year with average temperatures below 0 °C (32 °F).

== Group A: Tropical/megathermal climates ==
Tropical climate distribution

Tropical climates are characterized by constant high temperatures (at sea level and low elevations); all 12 months of the year have average temperatures of 18 °C (64.4 °F) or higher; and generally high annual precipitation. They are subdivided as follows:

=== Af: Tropical rainforest climate ===
All 12 months have an average precipitation of at least 60 mm (2.4 in). These climates usually occur within 10° latitude of the equator. This climate has no natural seasons in terms of thermal and moisture changes. When it is dominated most of the year by the doldrums low-pressure system due to the presence of the Intertropical Convergence Zone (ITCZ) and when there are no cyclones then the climate is qualified as equatorial. When the trade winds dominate most of the year, the climate is a tropical trade-wind rainforest climate.

Some of the places with this climate are indeed uniformly and monotonously wet throughout the year (e.g., the northwest Pacific coast of South and Central America, from Ecuador to Costa Rica; see, for instance, Andagoya, Colombia, Miami), but in many cases, the period of higher sun and longer days is distinctly wettest (as at Palembang, Indonesia) or the time of lower sun and shorter days may have more rain (as at Sitiawan, Malaysia). Among these places, some have a pure equatorial climate (Balikpapan, Kuala Lumpur, Kuching, Lae, Medan, Paramaribo, Pontianak, and Singapore) with the dominant ITCZ aerological mechanism and no cyclones or a subequatorial climate with occasional hurricanes (Davao, Ratnapura, Victoria).

(The term aseasonal refers to the lack in the tropical zone of large differences in daylight hours and mean monthly (or daily) temperature throughout the year. Annual cyclic changes occur in the tropics, but not as predictably as those in the temperate zone, albeit unrelated to temperature, but to water availability whether as rain, mist, soil, or groundwater. Plant response (e.g., phenology), animal (feeding, migration, reproduction, etc.), and human activities (plant sowing, harvesting, hunting, fishing, etc.) are tuned to this 'seasonality'. Indeed, in tropical South America and Central America, the rainy season, or the high water season, is called invierno (Spanish) or inverno (Portuguese), both meaning "winter," although it can occur in the Northern Hemisphere summer. Likewise, the dry season, or low water season, is called verano or verão, both meaning "summer," and it can occur in the Northern Hemisphere winter).

=== Am: Tropical monsoon climate ===
This type of climate results from the monsoon winds which change direction according to the seasons. This climate has a driest month (which nearly always occurs at or soon after the "winter" solstice for that side of the equator) with rainfall less than 60 mm (2.4 in), but at least $100-\left (\frac{\mathrm{total\,annual\,precipitation\,(mm)}}{25} \right)$ of average monthly precipitation.

=== Aw/As: Tropical savanna climate ===
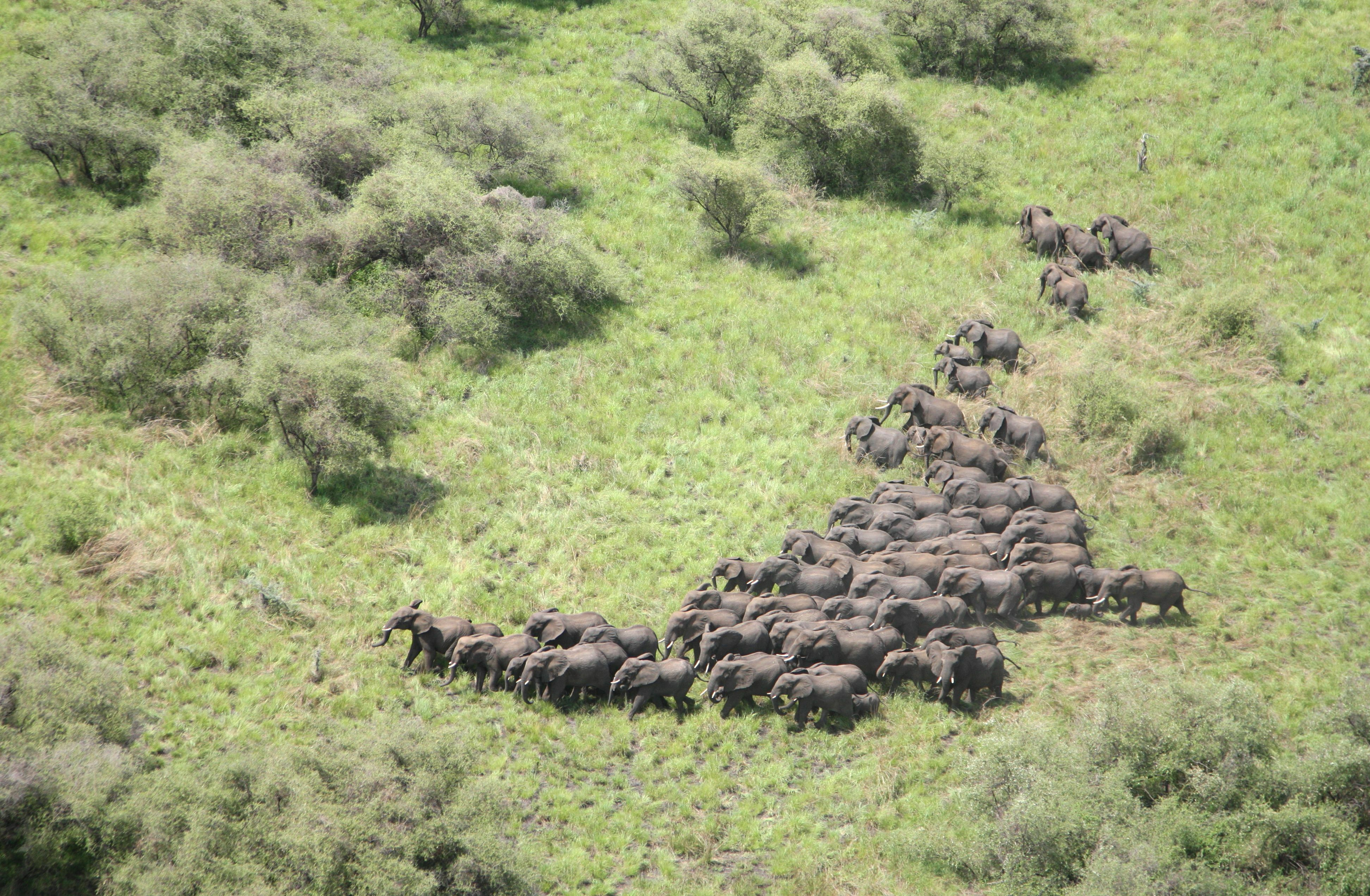
Aerial photograph of elephants in the tropical savanna, Boma-Jonglei, South Sudan

==== Aw: Tropical savanna climate with dry winters ====
Aw climates have a pronounced dry season, with the driest month having precipitation less than 60 mm (2.4 in) and less than $100-\left (\frac{\mathrm{total\,annual\,precipitation\,(mm)}}{25} \right)$ of average monthly precipitation.

Most places that have this climate are found at the outer margins of the tropical zone from the low teens to the mid-20s latitudes, but occasionally an inner-tropical location (e.g., San Marcos, Antioquia, Colombia) also qualifies. The Caribbean coast, eastward from the Gulf of Urabá on the Colombia–Panama border to the Orinoco River delta, on the Atlantic Ocean (about 4,000 km (2,500 mi)), have long dry periods (the extreme is the BWh climate, characterized by very low, unreliable precipitation, present, for instance, in extensive areas in the Guajira, and Coro, western Venezuela, the northernmost peninsulas in South America, which receive <300 mm (12 in) total annual precipitation, practically all in two or three months).

This condition extends to the Lesser Antilles and Greater Antilles forming the circum-Caribbean dry belt. The length and severity of the dry season diminish inland (southward); at the latitude of the Amazon River—which flows eastward, just south of the equatorial line—the climate is Af. East from the Andes, between the dry, arid Caribbean and the ever-wet Amazon are the Orinoco River's Llanos or savannas, from where this climate takes its name.

==== As: Tropical savanna climate with dry summers ====
Sometimes As is used in place of Aw if the dry season occurs during the time of higher sun and longer days (during summer). This is the case in parts of Hawaii, northwestern Dominican Republic, Eastern Africa, southeast India and northeast Sri Lanka, and the Brazilian Northeastern Coast. In places that have this climate type, the dry season occurs during the time of high sun and longer days generally because of rain shadow effects.

== Group B: Arid (desert and semi-arid) climates ==
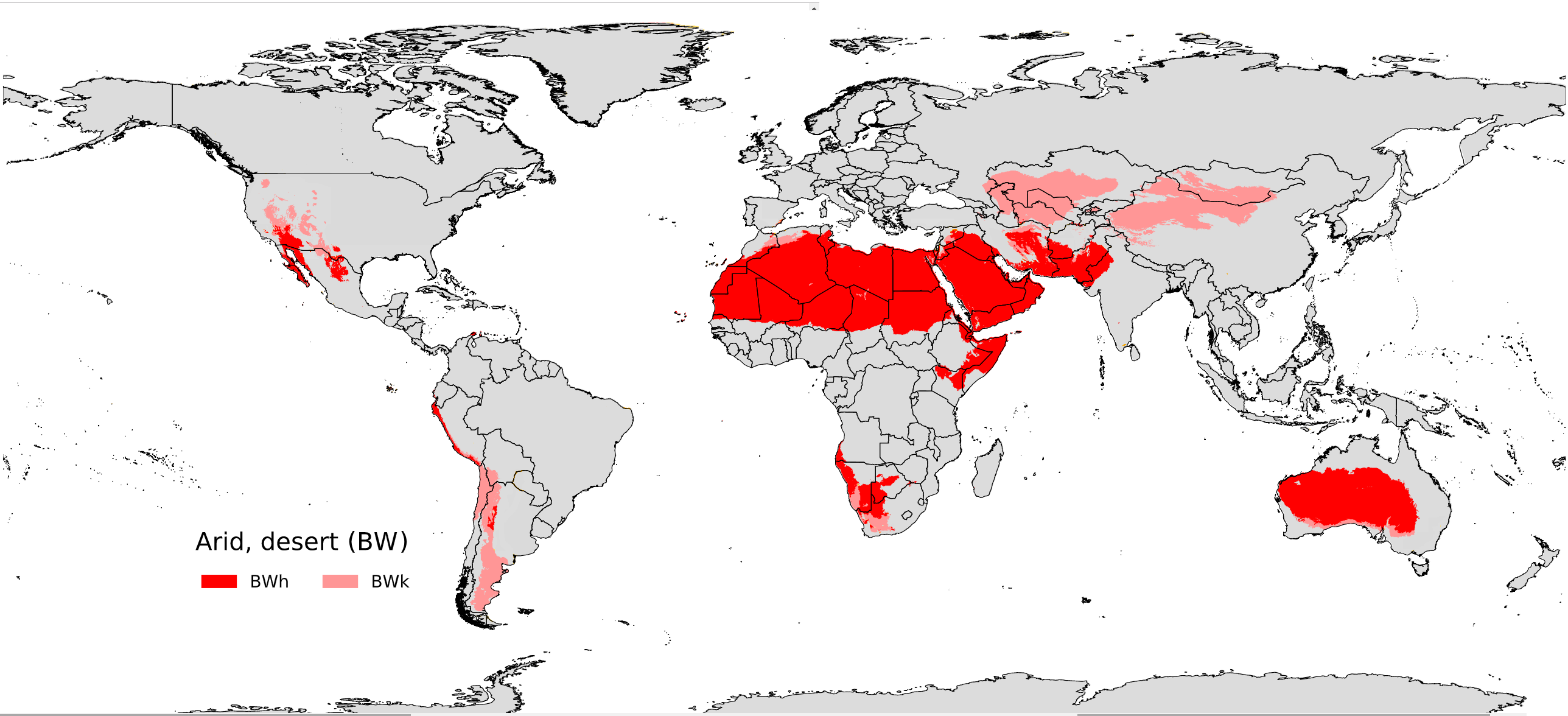
Arid climate distribution

These climates are characterized by the amount of annual precipitation less than a threshold value that approximates the potential evapotranspiration. The threshold value (in millimeters) is calculated as follows:

Multiply the average annual temperature in °C by 20, then add

1. 280 if 70% or more of the total precipitation is in the high-sun half of the year (April through September in the Northern Hemisphere, or October through March in the Southern), or
2. 140 if 30%–70% of the total precipitation is received during the applicable period, or
3. 0 if less than 30% of the total precipitation is so received.

According to the modified Köppen classification system used by modern climatologists, total precipitation in the warmest six months of the year is taken as a reference instead of the total precipitation in the high-sun half of the year.

If the annual precipitation is less than 50% of this threshold, the classification is BW (arid: desert climate); if it is in the range of 50%–100% of the threshold, the classification is BS (semi-arid: steppe climate).

A third letter can be included to indicate temperature. Here, h signifies low-latitude climate (average annual temperature above 18 °C) while k signified middle-latitude climate (average annual temperature below 18 °C).

Desert areas situated along the west coasts of continents at tropical or near-tropical locations characterized by frequent fog and low clouds, although these places rank among the driest on earth in terms of actual precipitation received, can be labeled BWn with the n denoting a climate characterized by frequent fog. An equivalent BSn category can be found in foggy coastal steppes.

=== BW: Arid climates ===
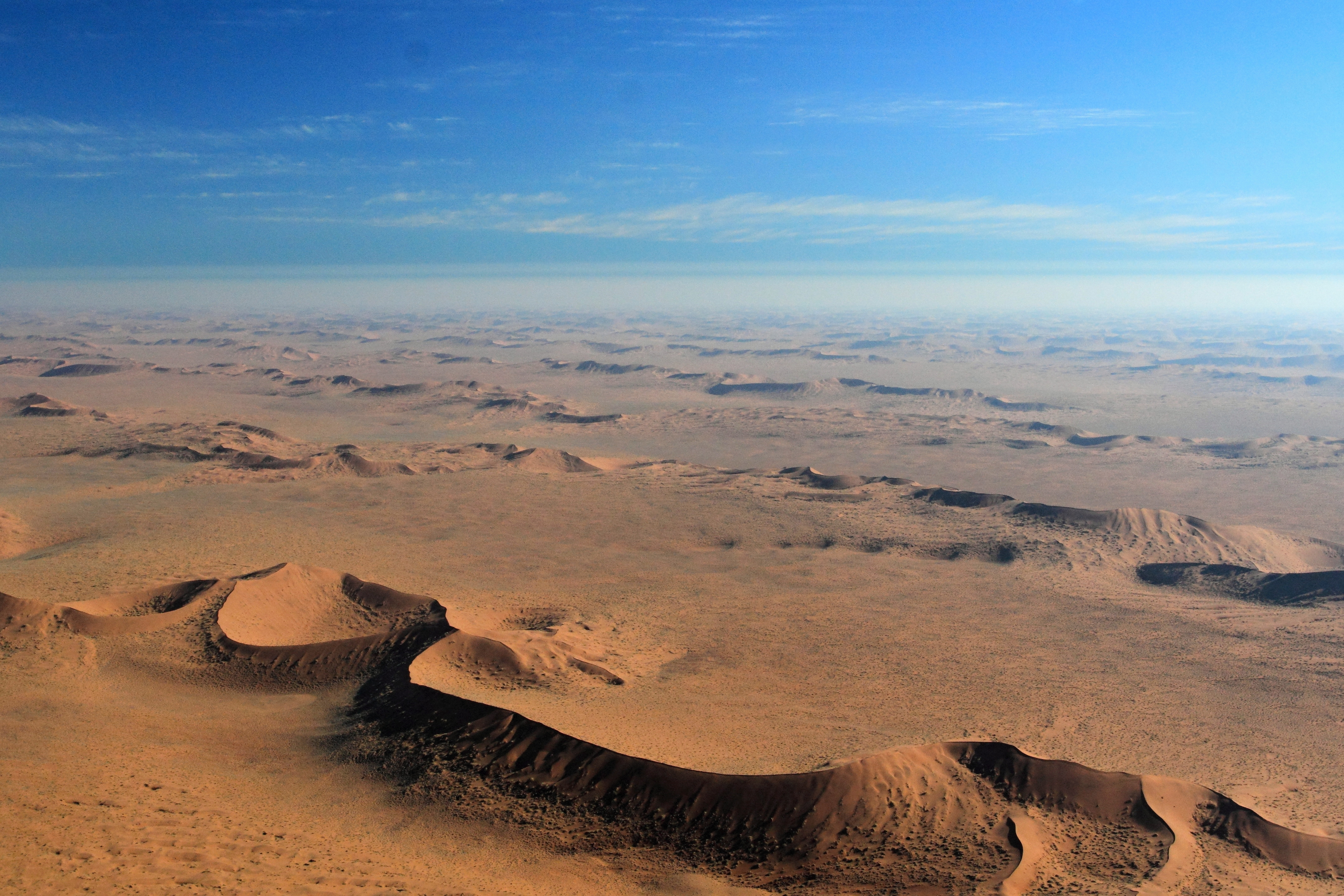
Namib Desert

The desert climate or arid climate (BW) is a dry climate sub-type in which there is a severe excess of evaporation over precipitation. The typically bald, rocky, or sandy surfaces in desert climates are dry and hold little moisture, quickly evaporating the already little rainfall they receive. Covering 14.2% of Earth's land area, hot deserts are the second-most common type of climate on Earth after the Polar climate.

There are two variations of a desert climate: a hot desert climate (BWh), and a cold desert climate (BWk). To delineate "hot desert climates" from "cold desert climates", a mean annual temperature of 18 °C (64.4 °F) is used as an isotherm so that a location with a BW type climate with the appropriate temperature above this isotherm is classified as "hot arid subtype" (BWh), and a location with the appropriate temperature below the isotherm is classified as "cold arid subtype" (BWk).

Most desert/arid climates receive between 25 and 200 mm (1 and 8 in) of rainfall annually, although some of the most consistently hot areas of Central Australia, the Sahel and Guajira Peninsula can be, due to extreme potential evapotranspiration, classed as arid with the annual rainfall as high as 430 millimetres or 17 inches.

==== BWh: Hot deserts ====
Hot desert climates (BWh) are typically found under the subtropical ridge in the lower middle latitudes or the subtropics, often between 20° and 33° north and south latitudes. In these locations, stable descending air and high pressure aloft clear clouds and create hot, arid conditions with intense sunshine. Hot desert climates are found across vast areas of North Africa, West Asia, northwestern parts of the Indian subcontinent, southwestern Africa, interior Australia, the Southwestern United States, northern Mexico, the coast of Peru and Chile, parts of the Brazilian sertão and the southeastern coast of Spain. This makes hot deserts present in every continent except Antarctica. At the time of high sun (summer), scorching, desiccating heat prevails. Hot-month average temperatures are normally between 29 and 35 °C (84 and 95 °F), and midday readings of 43–46 °C (109–115 °F) are common.

==== BWk: Cold deserts ====
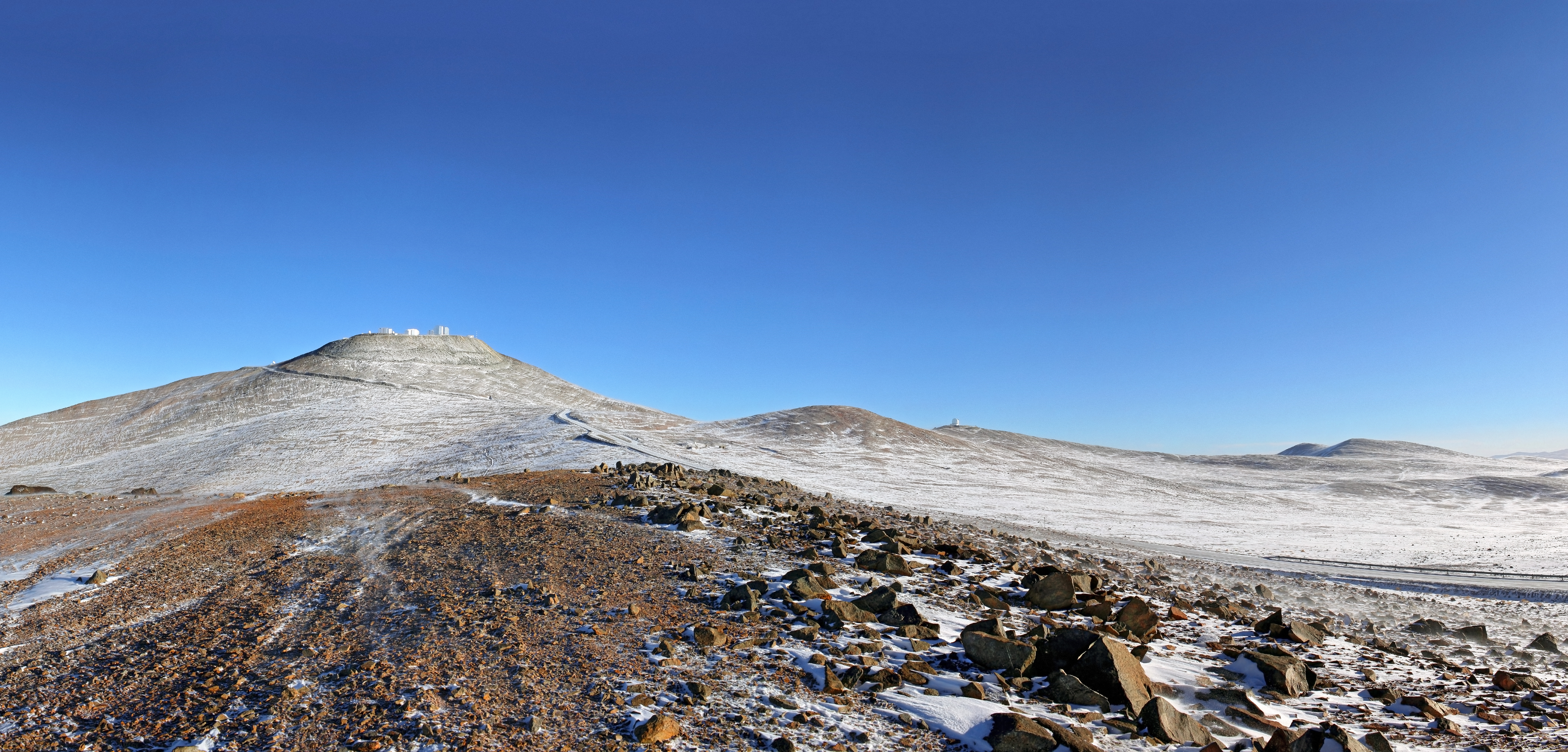
Rare snow in the Atacama Desert, at 2,600 m (8,500 ft) elevation

Cold desert climates (BWk) usually feature hot (or warm in a few instances), dry summers, though summers are not typically as hot as hot desert climates. Unlike hot desert climates, cold desert climates tend to feature cold, dry winters. Snow tends to be rare in regions with this climate. The Gobi Desert in northern China and Mongolia is one example of a cold desert. Though hot in the summer, it shares the freezing winters of the rest of Inner Asia. Summers in South America's Atacama Desert are mild, with only slight temperature variations between seasons. Cold desert climates are typically found at higher altitudes than hot desert climates and are usually drier than hot desert climates. Cold desert climates are typically located in temperate zones in the 30s and 40s latitudes, usually in the leeward rain shadow of high mountains, restricting precipitation from the westerly winds.

=== BS: Semi-arid (steppe) climates ===
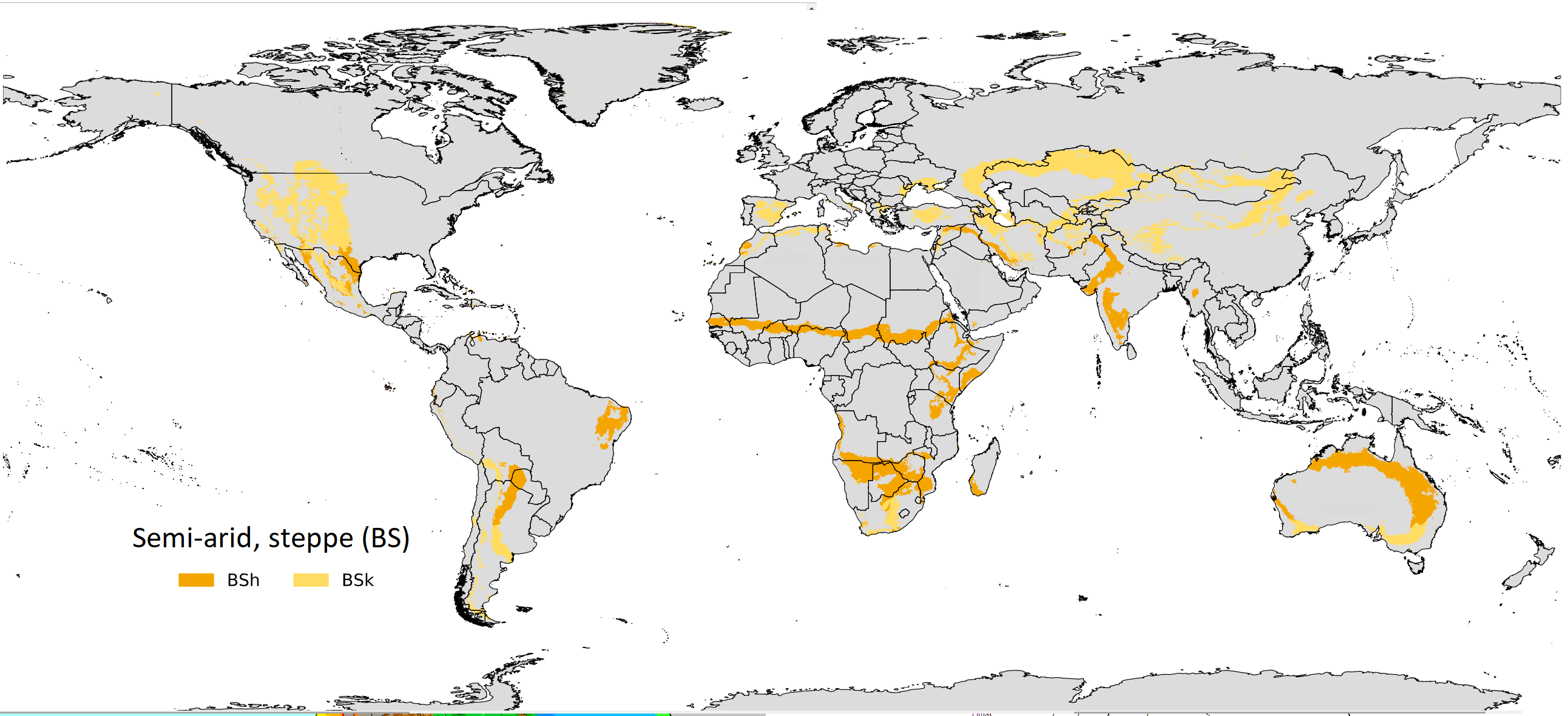
Regions with semi-arid climates

A semi-arid or steppe climate is a dry climate sub-type. It is located on regions that receive precipitation below potential evapotranspiration, but not as low as a desert climate. There are different kinds of semi-arid climates, depending on variables such as temperature, and they give rise to different biomes.

==== BSh: Hot semi-arid ====
Hot semi-arid climates (type "BSh") tend to be located from the high teens to mid-30s latitudes of the tropics and subtropics, typically in proximity to regions with a tropical savanna climate or a humid subtropical climate. These climates tend to have hot, or sometimes extremely hot, summers and warm to cool winters, with some to minimal precipitation. Hot semi-arid climates are most commonly found around the fringes of subtropical deserts.

==== BSk: Cold semi-arid ====
Cold semi-arid climates (type "BSk") tend to be located in elevated portions of temperate zones generally from the mid-30s to low 50s latitudes, typically bordering a humid continental climate or a Mediterranean climate. They are also typically found in continental interiors some distance from large bodies of water. Cold semi-arid climates usually feature warm to hot dry summers, though their summers are typically not quite as hot as those of hot semi-arid climates. Unlike hot semi-arid climates, areas with cold semi-arid climates tend to have cold and possibly freezing winters. These areas usually see some snowfall during the winter, though snowfall is much lower than at locations at similar latitudes with more humid climates.

== Group C: Temperate/mesothermal climates ==
Temperate climate distribution

In the Köppen climate system, temperate climates are defined as having an average temperature above 0 °C (32 °F) (or −3 °C (26.6 °F), as noted previously) in their coldest month but below 18 °C (64.4 °F). The average temperature of −3 °C (26.6 °F) roughly coincides with the equatorward limit of frozen ground and snow cover lasting for a month or more.

The second letter indicates the precipitation pattern—w indicates dry winters (driest winter month average precipitation less than one-tenth wettest summer month average precipitation). s indicates at least three times as much rain in the wettest month of winter as in the driest month of summer. f means significant precipitation in all seasons (neither above-mentioned set of conditions fulfilled).

The third letter indicates the degree of summer heat—a indicates warmest month average temperature above 22 °C (71.6 °F) while b indicates warmest month averaging below 22 °C but with at least four months averaging above 10 °C (50.0 °F), and c indicates one to three months averaging above 10 °C (50.0 °F).

=== Cs: Mediterranean-type climates ===
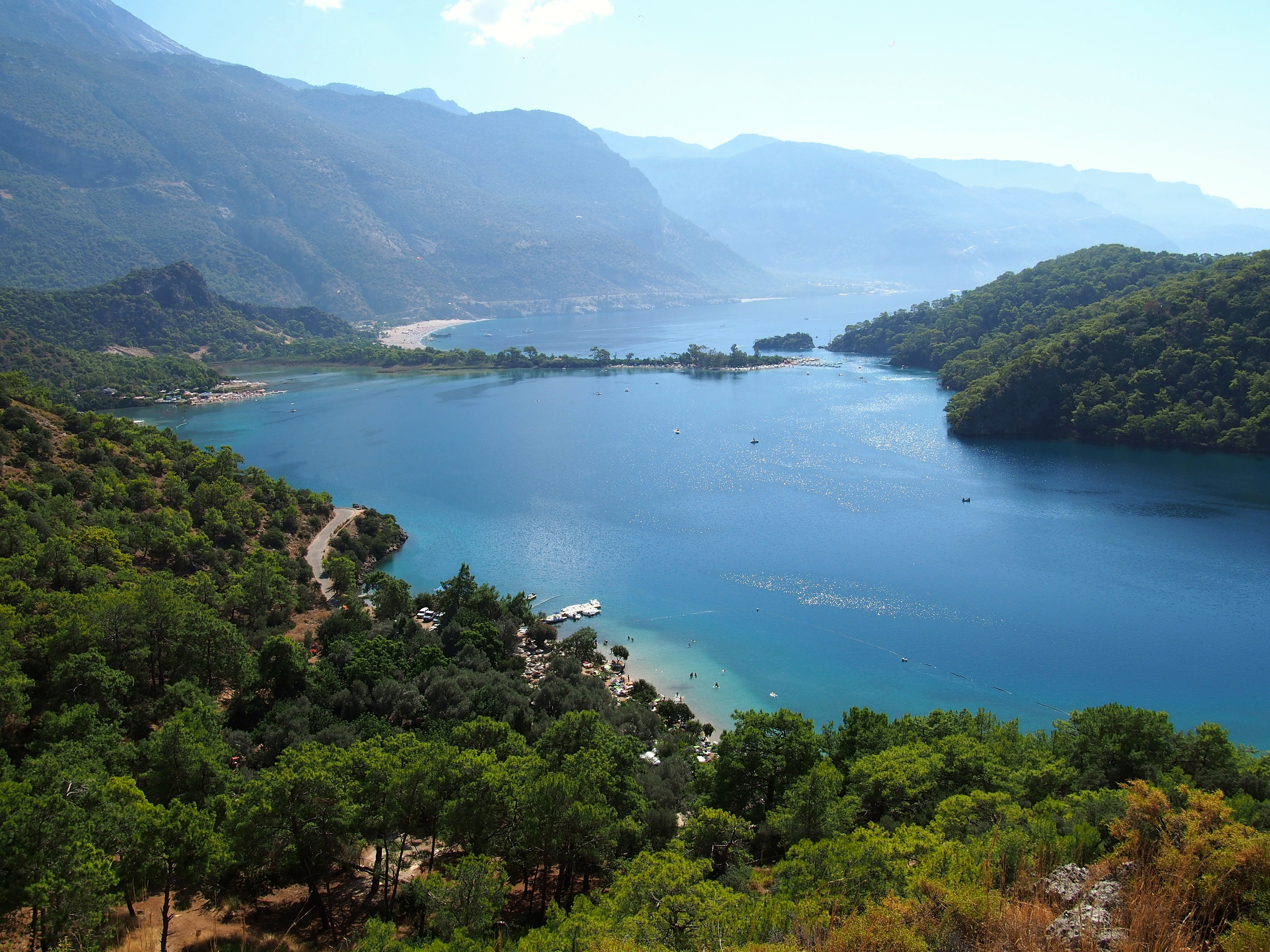
Aegean Sea at Ölüdeniz, Turkey

==== Csa: Hot-summer Mediterranean climates ====
These climates usually occur on the western sides of continents between the latitudes of 30° and 45°. These climates are in the polar front region in winter, and thus have moderate temperatures and changeable, rainy weather. Summers are hot and dry, due to the domination of the subtropical high-pressure systems, except in the immediate coastal areas, where summers are milder due to the nearby presence of cold ocean currents that may bring fog but prevent rain.

==== Csb: Warm-summer Mediterranean climates ====
Dry-summer climates sometimes extend to additional areas where the warmest month average temperatures do not reach 22 °C (71.6 °F), most often in the 40s latitudes. These climates are classified as Csb.

==== Csc: Cold-summer Mediterranean climates ====
Cold summer Mediterranean climates (Csc) exist in high-elevation areas adjacent to coastal Csb climate areas, where the strong maritime influence prevents the average winter monthly temperature from dropping below 0 °C (32 °F). This climate is rare and is predominantly found in climate fringes and isolated areas of the Cascades and Andes Mountains, as the dry-summer climate extends further poleward in the Americas than elsewhere. Rare instances of this climate can be found in some coastal locations in the North Atlantic, central Tasmania, and at high altitudes in Hawaii.

=== Cfa: Humid subtropical climates ===
Humid subtropical climate in Li River, China

These climates usually occur on the eastern coasts and eastern sides of continents, usually in the high 20s and 30s latitudes. Unlike the Mediterranean climates with dry summers, humid subtropical climates have a warm and wet flow from the tropics that creates warm and moist conditions in the summer months. As such, summer (not winter as is the case in Mediterranean climates) is often the wettest season.

The flow out of the subtropical highs and the summer monsoon creates a southerly flow from the tropics that brings warm and moist air to the lower east sides of continents. This flow is often what brings the frequent and strong but short-lived summer thundershowers so typical of the more southerly subtropical climates like the southeast United States, southern China, and Japan.

=== Cfb: Oceanic climates ===
==== Marine west coast climate ====
Cfb climates usually occur in the higher middle latitudes on the western sides of continents; they are typically situated immediately poleward of the Mediterranean climates in the 40s and 50s latitudes. However, in southeast Australia, southeast South America, and extreme southern Africa, this climate is found immediately poleward of temperate climates, on places near the coast and at a somewhat lower latitude.

These climates are dominated all year round by the polar front, leading to changeable, often overcast weather. Summers are mild due to cool ocean currents. Winters are milder than other climates in similar latitudes, but usually very cloudy, and frequently wet. Cfb climates are also encountered at high elevations in certain subtropical and tropical areas, where the climate would be that of a subtropical/tropical rainforest if not for the altitude. These climates are called "highlands".

==== Subtropical highland climate with uniform rainfall ====
Subtropical highland climates with uniform rainfall (Cfb) are a type of oceanic climate mainly found in the highlands of Australia, such as in or around the Great Dividing Range in the north of the state of New South Wales, and also sparsely in other continents, such as in South America, among others. Unlike a typical Cwb climate, they tend to have rainfall spread evenly throughout the year. They have characteristics of both the Cfb and Cfa climates, but unlike these climates, they have a high diurnal temperature variation and low humidity, owing to their inland location and relatively high elevation.

=== Cfc: Subpolar oceanic climate ===
Subpolar oceanic climates (Cfc) occur poleward of or at higher elevations than the maritime temperate climates and are mostly confined either to narrow coastal strips on the western poleward margins of the continents, or, especially in the Northern Hemisphere, to islands off such coasts. They occur in both hemispheres, generally in the high 50s and 60s latitudes in the Northern Hemisphere and the 50s latitudes in the Southern Hemisphere.

=== Cw: Dry-winter subtropical climates ===
==== Cwa: Dry-winter humid subtropical climate ====
Cwa is a monsoonal influenced version of the humid subtropical climate, having the classic dry winter–wet summer pattern associated with tropical monsoonal climates. They are found at similar latitudes as the Cfa climates, except in regions where monsoons are more prevalent. These regions are in the Southern Cone of South America, the Gangetic Plain of South Asia, southeastern Africa, parts of East Asia and Mexico, and Northern Vietnam of Southeast Asia.

==== Cwb: Dry-winter subtropical highland climate ====
Dry-winter subtropical highland climate (Cwb) is a type of climate mainly found in highlands inside the tropics of Central America, South America, Africa, and South and Southeast Asia or areas in the subtropics. Winters are noticeable and dry, and summers can be very rainy. In the tropics, the monsoon is provoked by the tropical air masses and the dry winters by subtropical high pressure.

==== Cwc: Dry-winter cold subtropical highland climate ====
Dry-winter cold subtropical highland climates (Cwc) exist in high-elevation areas adjacent to Cwb climates. This climate is rare and is found mainly in isolated locations mostly in the Andes in Bolivia and Peru, as well as in sparse mountain locations in Southeast Asia.

== Group D: Continental/microthermal climates ==
Continental climate distribution

These climates have an average temperature above 10 °C (50 °F) in their warmest months, and the coldest month average below 0 °C (32 °F) (or −3 °C (26.6 °F), as noted previously). These usually occur in the interiors of continents and on their upper east coasts, normally north of 40°N. In the Southern Hemisphere, group D climates are extremely rare due to the smaller land masses in the middle latitudes and the almost complete absence of land at 40–60°S, existing only in some highland locations.

=== Dfa/Dwa/Dsa: Hot summer humid continental climates ===
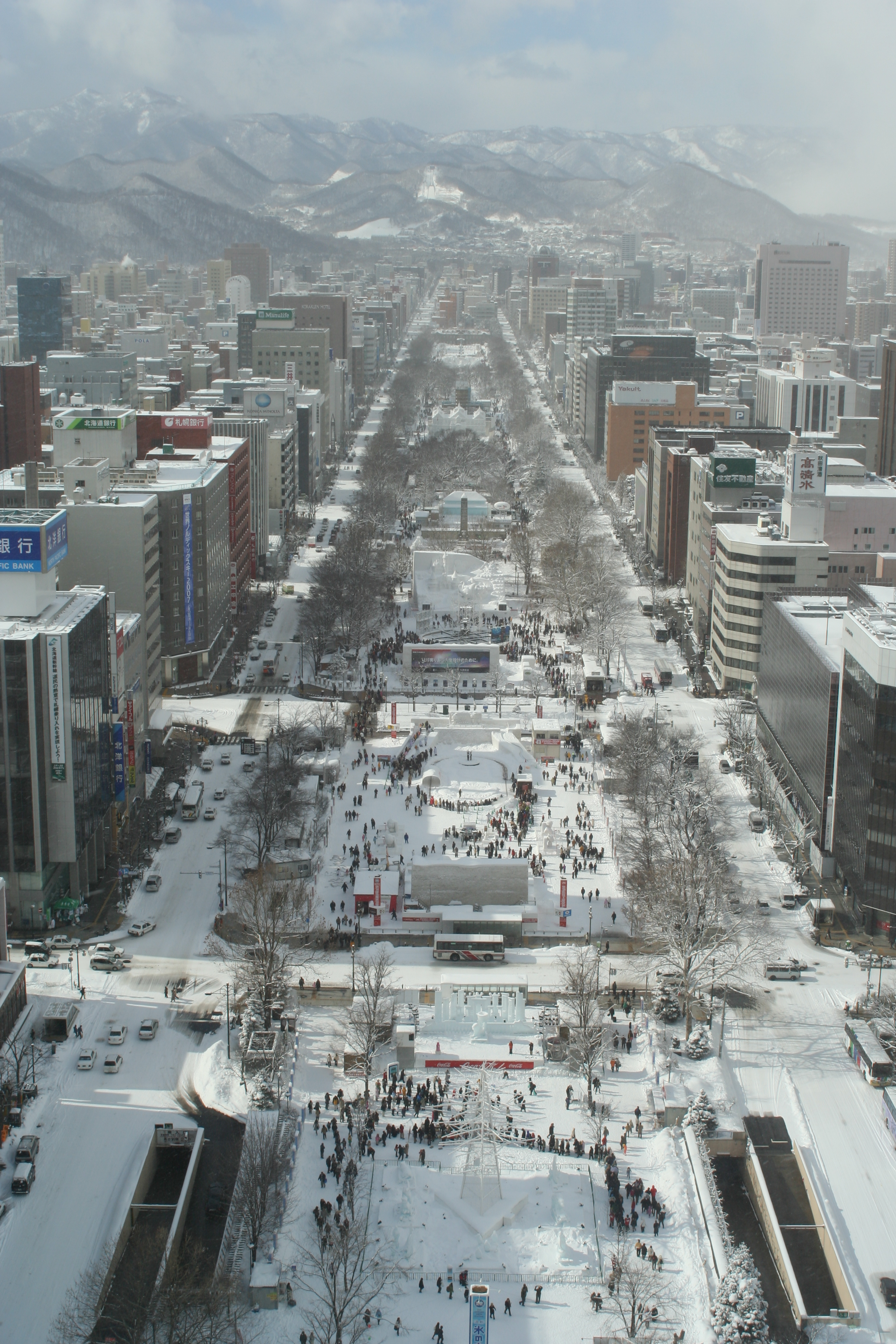
The snowy city of Sapporo, Japan, has a humid continental climate (Dfa)

Dfa climates usually occur in the high 30s and low 40s latitudes, with a qualifying average temperature in the warmest month of greater than 22 °C (72 °F). In Europe, these climates tend to be much drier than in North America. Dsa exists at higher elevations adjacent to areas with hot summer Mediterranean (Csa) climates.

These climates exist only in the Northern Hemisphere because the Southern Hemisphere has no large landmasses isolated from the moderating effects of the sea within the middle latitudes.

In eastern Asia, Dwa climates extend further south into the mid-30s latitudes due to the influence of the Siberian high-pressure system, which also causes winters there to be dry, and summers can be very wet because of monsoon circulation.

=== Dfb/Dwb/Dsb: Warm summer humid continental/hemiboreal climates ===
Dfb climates are immediately poleward of hot summer continental climates, generally in the high 40s and low 50s latitudes in North America and Asia, and also extending to higher latitudes into the high 50s and low 60s latitudes in central and eastern Europe, between the maritime temperate and continental subarctic climates.

Like with all Group D climates, Dwb climates mostly only occur in the northern hemisphere.

Dsb arises from the same scenario as Dsa, but at even higher altitudes or latitudes, and chiefly in North America, since the Mediterranean climates extend further poleward than in Eurasia.

=== Dfc/Dwc/Dsc: Subarctic/boreal climates ===
Dfc, Dsc and Dwc climates occur poleward of the other group D climates, or at higher altitudes, generally in the 50s and 60s latitudes.

=== Dfd/Dwd/Dsd: Subarctic/boreal climates with severe winters ===
Places with this climate have severe winters, with the temperature in their coldest month lower than −38 °C (−36 °F). These climates occur only in eastern Siberia, and are the second coldest, before EF. The coldest recorded temperatures in the Northern Hemisphere belonged to this climate. The names of some of the places with this climate have become veritable synonyms for the extreme, severe winter cold.

== Group E: Polar climates ==
Polar climate distribution

In the Köppen climate system, polar climates are defined as the warmest temperature of any month being below 10 °C (50 °F). Polar climates are further divided into two types, tundra climates and icecap climates:

=== ET: Tundra climate ===
Tundra climate (ET): warmest month has an average temperature between 0 °C (32 °F) and 10 °C (50 °F). These climates occur on the northern edges of the North American and Eurasian land masses (generally north of 70 °N although they may be found farther south depending on local conditions), and on nearby islands. ET climates are also found on some islands near the Antarctic Convergence, and at high elevations outside the polar regions, above the tree line.

=== EF: Ice cap climate ===
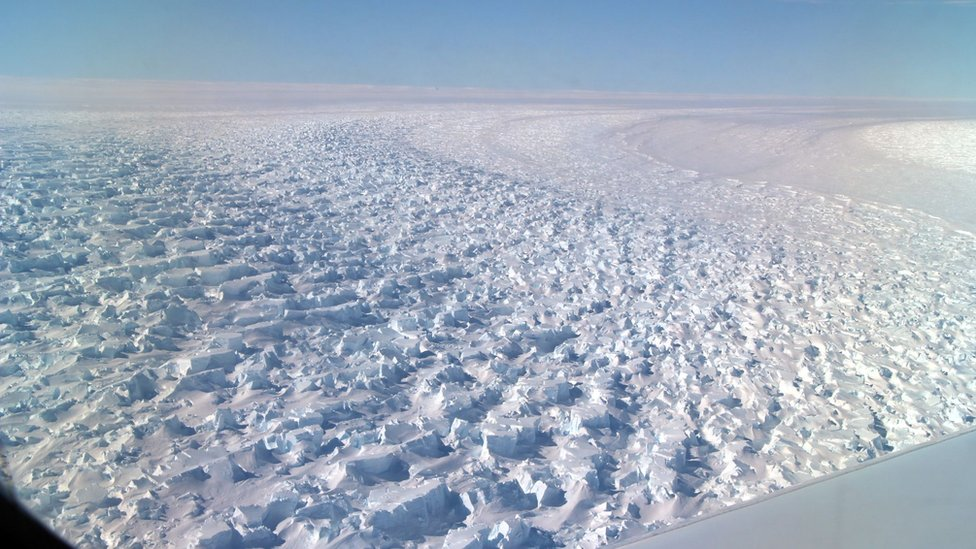
Denman Glacier, Antarctica

Ice cap climate (EF): this climate is dominant in Antarctica, inner Greenland, and summits of many high mountains, even at lower latitudes. Monthly average temperatures never exceed 0 °C (32 °F).

== Ecological significance ==
=== Biomass ===
The Köppen climate classification is based on the empirical relationship between climate and vegetation. This classification provides an efficient way to describe climatic conditions defined by temperature and precipitation and their seasonality with a single metric. Because climatic conditions identified by the Köppen classification are ecologically relevant, it has been widely used to map the geographic distribution of long-term climate and associated ecosystem conditions.

=== Climate change ===
Over recent years, there has been an increasing interest in using the classification to identify changes in climate and potential changes in vegetation over time. The most important ecological significance of the Köppen climate classification is that it helps to predict the dominant vegetation type based on the climatic data and vice versa.

In 2015, a Nanjing University paper published in Scientific Reports analyzing climate classifications found that between 1950 and 2010, approximately 5.7% of all land area worldwide had moved from wetter and colder classifications to drier and hotter classifications. The authors also found that the change "cannot be explained as natural variations but are driven by anthropogenic factors".

A 2018 study provides detailed maps for present and future Köppen-Geiger climate classification maps at 1-km resolution.

== Other Köppen climate maps ==
All maps use the ≥0 °C (32 °F) definition for the temperate-continental border.

North America

Europe

Russia

Central Asia

East Asia

South America

Africa

Western Asia

South Asia

Southeast Asia

Melanesia/Oceania

Australia

New Zealand

World (1991–2020)

World (2071–2099, SSP245)

== See also ==
- Trewartha climate classification
- Hardiness zone
- Holdridge life zones
- List of cities by Köppen climate classification
